= 2008 North Carolina House of Representatives election =

- November 4, 2008

All 120 seats in the North Carolina House of Representatives 61 seats needed for a majority
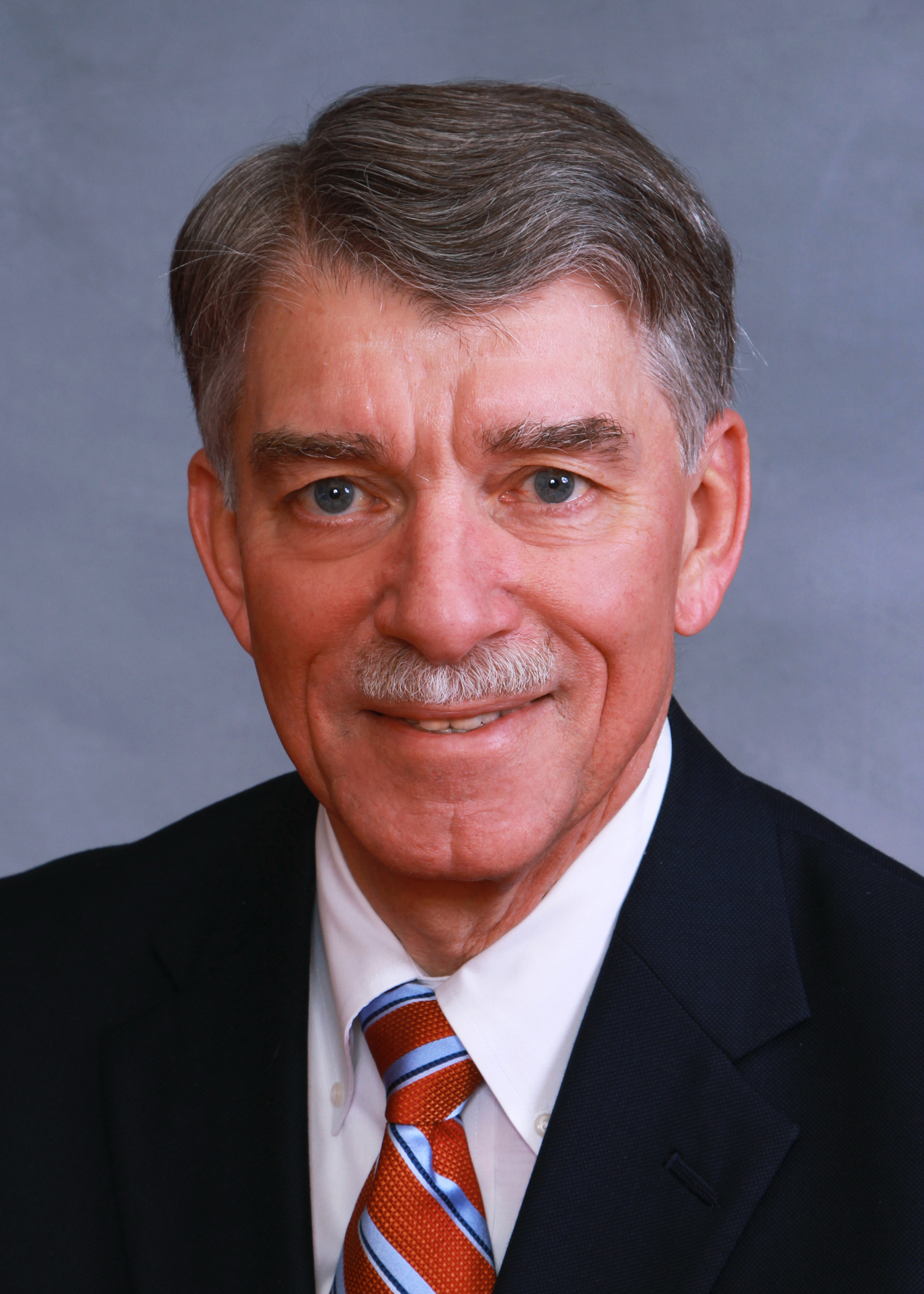

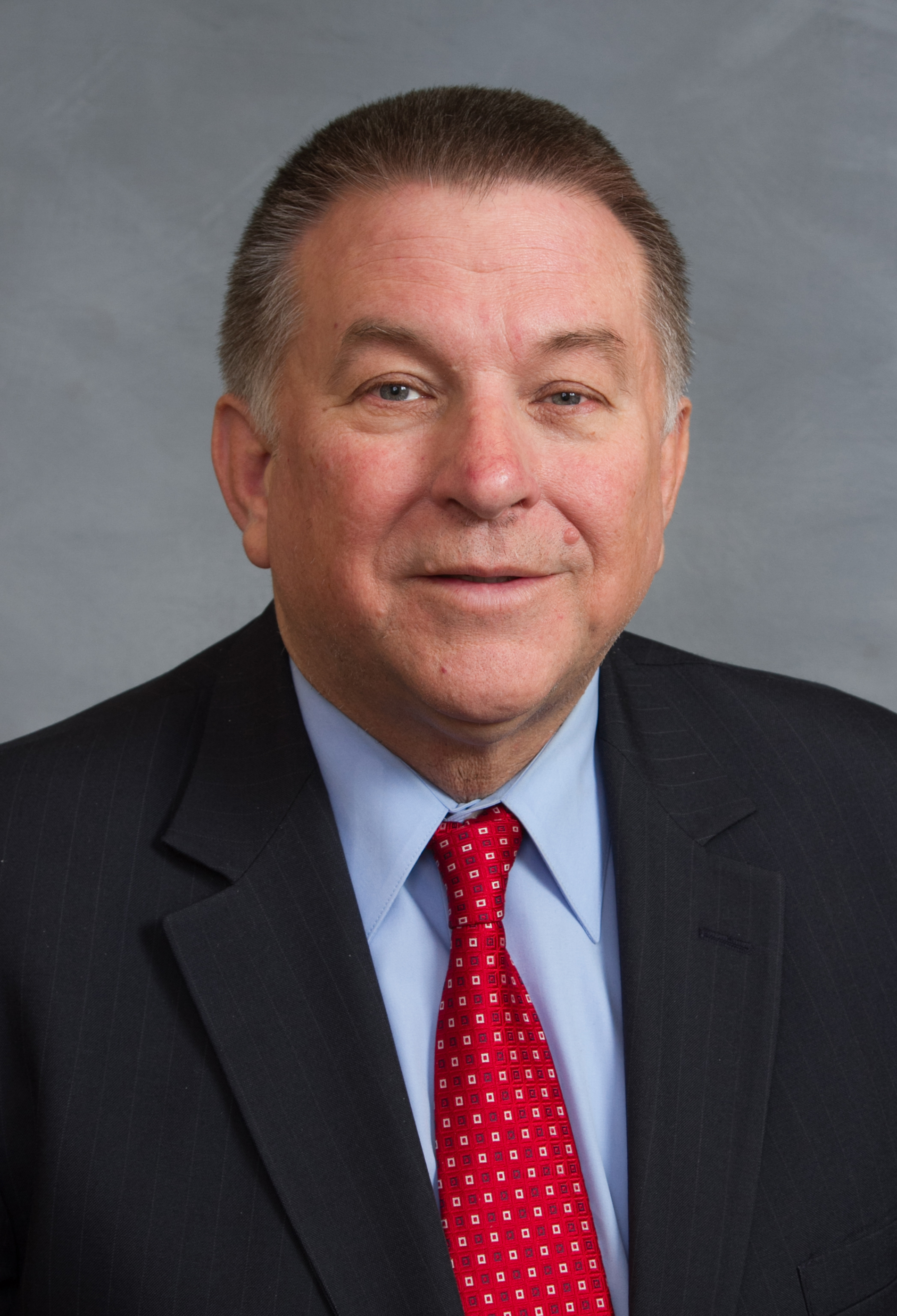
	Majority party	Minority party
Leader	Joe Hackney	Paul Stam
Party	Democratic	Republican
Leader since	January 1, 2007	January 1, 2007
Leader's seat	54th - Chapel Hill	37th - Apex
Last election	68	52
Seats won	68	52
Seat change	Steady	Steady
Popular vote	2,030,751	1,618,648
Percentage	55.14%	43.95%
- Results: Democratic hold Democratic gain Republican hold Republican gain
Speaker before election
Joe Hackney
Democratic
Elected Speaker
Joe Hackney
Democratic

An election was held on November 4, 2008, to elect all 120 members to North Carolina's House of Representatives. The election coincided with elections for other offices, including the presidency, U.S Senate, U.S. House of Representatives, Governor, Council of State, and state senate. The primary election was held on May 6, 2008, with a primary run-off held on June 24, 2008. This was the last election in which Democrats won the North Carolina State House until 2026.

== Results summary ==
District	Incumbent	Party	Elected	Party
1st	Bill Owens	Dem	Bill Owens	Dem
2nd	Timothy Spear	Dem	Timothy Spear	Dem
3rd	Alice Graham Underhill	Dem	Alice Graham Underhill	Dem
4th	Russell Tucker	Dem	Russell Tucker	Dem
5th	Annie Mobley	Dem	Annie Mobley	Dem
6th	Arthur Williams	Dem	Arthur Williams	Dem
7th	Angela Bryant	Dem	Angela Bryant	Dem
8th	Edith Warren	Dem	Edith Warren	Dem
9th	Marian McLawhorn	Dem	Marian McLawhorn	Dem
10th	Van Braxton	Dem	Van Braxton	Dem
11th	Louis Pate†	Rep	Efton Sager	Rep
12th	William Wainwright	Dem	William Wainwright	Dem
13th	Pat McElraft	Rep	Pat McElraft	Rep
14th	George Cleveland	Rep	George Cleveland	Rep
15th	Robert Grady	Rep	Robert Grady	Rep
16th	Carolyn Justice	Rep	Carolyn Justice	Rep
17th	Bonner Stiller	Rep	Bonner Stiller	Rep
18th	Sandra Hughes	Dem	Sandra Hughes	Dem
19th	Danny McComas	Rep	Danny McComas	Rep
20th	Dewey Hill	Dem	Dewey Hill	Dem
21st	Larry Bell	Dem	Larry Bell	Dem
22nd	William Brisson	Dem	William Brisson	Dem
23rd	Joe Tolson	Dem	Joe Tolson	Dem
24th	Jean Farmer-Butterfield	Dem	Jean Farmer-Butterfield	Dem
25th	Bill Daughtridge†	Rep	Randy Stewart	Dem
26th	Leo Daughtry	Rep	Leo Daughtry	Rep
27th	Michael Wray	Dem	Michael Wray	Dem
28th	James Langdon Jr.	Rep	James Langdon Jr.	Rep
29th	Larry Hall	Dem	Larry Hall	Dem
30th	Paul Luebke	Dem	Paul Luebke	Dem
31st	Mickey Michaux	Dem	Mickey Michaux	Dem
32nd	Jim Crawford	Dem	Jim Crawford	Dem
33rd	Dan Blue	Dem	Dan Blue	Dem
34th	Grier Martin	Dem	Grier Martin	Dem
35th	Jennifer Weiss	Dem	Jennifer Weiss	Dem
36th	Nelson Dollar	Rep	Nelson Dollar	Rep
37th	Paul Stam	Rep	Paul Stam	Rep
38th	Deborah Ross	Dem	Deborah Ross	Dem
39th	Linda Coleman	Dem	Linda Coleman	Dem
40th	Marilyn Avila	Rep	Marilyn Avila	Rep
41st	Ty Harrell	Dem	Ty Harrell	Dem
42nd	Marvin Lucas	Dem	Marvin Lucas	Dem
43rd	Mary McAllister	Dem	Elmer Floyd	Dem
44th	Margaret Dickson	Dem	Margaret Dickson	Dem
45th	Rick Glazier	Dem	Rick Glazier	Dem
46th	Douglas Yongue	Dem	Douglas Yongue	Dem
47th	Ronnie Sutton	Dem	Ronnie Sutton	Dem
48th	Garland Pierce	Dem	Garland Pierce	Dem
49th	Lucy Allen	Dem	Lucy Allen	Dem
50th	Bill Faison	Dem	Bill Faison	Dem
51st	Jimmy Love Sr.	Dem	Jimmy Love Sr.	Dem
52nd	Joe Boylan	Rep	Jamie Boles	Rep
53rd	David Lewis	Rep	David Lewis	Rep
54th	Joe Hackney	Dem	Joe Hackney	Dem
55th	Winkie Wilkins	Dem	Winkie Wilkins	Dem
56th	Verla Insko	Dem	Verla Insko	Dem
57th	Pricey Harrison	Dem	Pricey Harrison	Dem
58th	Alma Adams	Dem	Alma Adams	Dem
59th	Maggie Jeffus	Dem	Maggie Jeffus	Dem
60th	Earl Jones	Dem	Earl Jones	Dem
61st	Laura Wiley	Rep	Laura Wiley	Rep
62nd	John Blust	Rep	John Blust	Rep
63rd	Alice Bordsen	Dem	Alice Bordsen	Dem
64th	Cary Allred	Rep	Cary Allred	Rep
65th	Nelson Cole	Dem	Nelson Cole	Dem
66th	Melanie Wade Goodwin	Dem	Melanie Wade Goodwin	Dem
67th	Kenny Furr	Rep	Justin Burr	Rep
68th	Curtis Blackwood	Rep	Curtis Blackwood	Rep
69th	Pryor Gibson	Dem	Pryor Gibson	Dem
70th	Pat Hurley	Rep	Pat Hurley	Rep
71st	Larry Womble	Dem	Larry Womble	Dem
72nd	Earline Parmon	Dem	Earline Parmon	Dem
73rd	Larry Brown	Rep	Larry Brown	Rep
74th	Dale Folwell	Rep	Dale Folwell	Rep
75th	Bill McGee	Rep	Bill McGee	Rep
76th	Fred Steen II	Rep	Fred Steen II	Rep
77th	Lorene Coates	Dem	Lorene Coates	Dem
78th	Harold Brubaker	Rep	Harold Brubaker	Rep
79th	Julia Craven Howard	Rep	Julia Craven Howard	Rep
80th	Jerry Dockham	Rep	Jerry Dockham	Rep
81st	Hugh Holliman	Dem	Hugh Holliman	Dem
82nd	Jeff Barnhart	Rep	Jeff Barnhart	Rep
83rd	Linda Johnson	Rep	Linda Johnson	Rep
84th	Phillip Frye	Rep	Phillip Frye	Rep
85th	Mitch Gillespie	Rep	Mitch Gillespie	Rep
86th	Walt Church	Dem	Hugh Blackwell	Rep
87th	Edgar Starnes	Rep	Edgar Starnes	Rep
88th	Ray Warren	Dem	Ray Warren	Dem
89th	Mitchell Setzer	Rep	Mitchell Setzer	Rep
90th	Jim Harrell	Dem	Sarah Stevens	Rep
91st	Bryan Holloway	Rep	Bryan Holloway	Rep
92nd	George Holmes†	Rep	Darrell McCormick	Rep
93rd	Cullie Tarleton	Dem	Cullie Tarleton	Dem
94th	Tracy Walker†	Rep	Shirley Randleman	Rep
95th	Karen Ray	Rep	Grey Mills	Rep
96th	Mark Hilton	Rep	Mark Hilton	Rep
97th	Joe Kiser†	Rep	Jonathan Rhyne Jr.	Rep
98th	Thom Tillis	Rep	Thom Tillis	Rep
99th	Drew Saunders	Dem	Nick Mackey	Dem
100th	Tricia Cotham	Dem	Tricia Cotham	Dem
101st	Beverly Earle	Dem	Beverly Earle	Dem
102nd	Becky Carney	Dem	Becky Carney	Dem
103rd	Jim Gulley	Rep	Jim Gulley	Rep
104th	Ruth Samuelson	Rep	Ruth Samuelson	Rep
105th	Ric Killian	Rep	Ric Killian	Rep
106th	Martha Alexander	Dem	Martha Alexander	Dem
107th	Pete Cunningham†	Dem	Kelly Alexander	Dem
108th	Wil Neumann	Rep	Wil Neumann	Rep
109th	William Current	Rep	William Current	Rep
110th	Debbie Clary†	Rep	Pearl Burris-Floyd	Rep
111th	Tim Moore	Rep	Tim Moore	Rep
112th	Bob England	Dem	Bob England	Dem
113th	Trudi Walend†	Rep	David Guice	Rep
114th	Susan Fisher	Dem	Susan Fisher	Dem
115th	Bruce Goforth	Dem	Bruce Goforth	Dem
116th	Charles Thomas†	Rep	Jane Whilden	Dem
117th	Carolyn Justus	Rep	Carolyn Justus	Rep
118th	Ray Rapp	Dem	Ray Rapp	Dem
119th	Phil Haire	Dem	Phil Haire	Dem
120th	Roger West	Rep	Roger West	Rep

† - Incumbent not seeking re-election

Party	Candi- dates	Votes		Seats		
Party	Candi- dates	No.	%	No.	+/–	%
Democratic Party	98	2,030,751	55.141%	68	Steady	57%
Republican Party	83	1,618,648	43.951%	52	Steady	43%
Libertarian Party	12	33,436	0.908%	0	Steady	0%
Total	193	3,682,835	100.00%	120	Steady	100.00%

House seats
Democratic	57%
Republican	43%

Popular vote
Democratic	55.141%
Republican	43.951%
Libertarian	0.908%

=== Incumbents defeated in primary election ===
- Mary McAllister (D-District 43), defeated by Elmer Floyd (D)
- Joe Boylan (R-District 52), defeated by Jamie Boles (R)
- Kenny Furr (R-District 67), defeated by Justin Burr (R)
- Karen Ray (R-District 95), defeated by Grey Mills (R)
- Drew Saunders (D-District 99), defeated by Nick Mackey (D)

=== Incumbents defeated in general election ===
- Walt Church (D-District 86), defeated by Hugh Blackwell (R)
- Jim Harrell (D-District 90), defeated by Sarah Stevens (R)

=== Open seats that changed parties ===
- Bill Daughtridge (R-District 25) ran for State Treasurer, seat won by Randy Stewart (D)
- Charles Thomas (R-District 116) didn't seek re-election, seat won by Jane Whilden (D)

== Predictions ==
Source	Ranking	As of
Stateline	Likely D	October 15, 2008

== Detailed Results ==
=== Districts 1-19 ===
==== District 1 ====
Incumbent Democrat Bill Owens has represented the 1st District since 1995.

North Carolina House of Representatives 1st district general election, 2008
Party	Candidate	Votes	%
Democratic	Bill Owens (incumbent)	25,181	100%
Total votes		25,181	100%
Democratic hold			

==== District 2 ====
Incumbent Democrat Timothy Spear has represented the 2nd district since 2006.

North Carolina House of Representatives 2nd district general election, 2008
Party	Candidate	Votes	%
Democratic	Timothy Spear (incumbent)	20,705	63.30%
Republican	Chris East	11,152	34.09%
Libertarian	Jesse Mignogna	852	2.60%
Total votes		32,709	100%
Democratic hold			

==== District 3 ====
Incumbent Democrat Alice Graham Underhill has represented the 3rd district since 2005.

North Carolina House of Representatives 3rd district general election, 2008
Party	Candidate	Votes	%
Democratic	Alice Graham Underhill (incumbent)	16,943	49.92%
Republican	Norman Sanderson	16,173	47.65%
Libertarian	Herb Sobel	825	2.43%
Total votes		33,941	100%
Democratic hold			

==== District 4 ====
Incumbent Democrat Russell Tucker has represented the 4th district since 2005.

North Carolina House of Representatives 4th district general election, 2008
Party	Candidate	Votes	%
Democratic	Russell Tucker (incumbent)	19,024	100%
Total votes		19,024	100%
Democratic hold			

==== District 5 ====
Incumbent Democrat Annie Mobley has represented the 5th district since 2007.

North Carolina House of Representatives 5th district general election, 2008
Party	Candidate	Votes	%
Democratic	Annie Mobley (incumbent)	23,381	100%
Total votes		23,381	100%
Democratic hold			

==== District 6 ====
Incumbent Democrat Arthur Williams has represented the 6th district since 2003.

North Carolina House of Representatives 6th district general election, 2008
Party	Candidate	Votes	%
Democratic	Arthur Williams (incumbent)	25,038	100%
Total votes		25,038	100%
Democratic hold			

==== District 7 ====
Incumbent Democrat Angela Bryant has represented the 7th district since 2007.

North Carolina House of Representatives 7th district general election, 2008
Party	Candidate	Votes	%
Democratic	Angela Bryant (incumbent)	22,928	100%
Total votes		22,928	100%
Democratic hold			

==== District 8 ====
Incumbent Democrat Edith Warren has represented the 8th district and its predecessors since 1999.

North Carolina House of Representatives 8th district general election, 2008
Party	Candidate	Votes	%
Democratic	Edith Warren (incumbent)	25,313	100%
Total votes		25,313	100%
Democratic hold			

==== District 9 ====
Incumbent Democrat Marian McLawhorn has represented the 9th district since 1999.

North Carolina House of representatives 9th district general election, 2008
Party	Candidate	Votes	%
Democratic	Marian McLawhorn (incumbent)	24,916	62.27%
Republican	Ginny Cooper	15,094	37.73%
Total votes		40,010	100%
Democratic hold			

==== District 10 ====
Incumbent Democrat Van Braxton has represented the 10th district since 2007.

North Carolina House of Representatives 10th district general election, 2008
Party	Candidate	Votes	%
Democratic	Van Braxton (incumbent)	15,506	51.56%
Republican	Stephen LaRoque	14,565	48.44%
Total votes		30,071	100%
Democratic hold			

==== District 11 ====
Incumbent Republican Louis Pate has represented the 11th district since 2003. Pate ran for the State Senate and Republican Efton Sager won the open seat.

North Carolina House of Representatives 11th district general election, 2008
Party	Candidate	Votes	%
Republican	Efton Sager	18,487	57.95%
Democratic	Ronnie Griffin	13,412	42.05%
Total votes		31,899	100%
Republican hold			

==== District 12 ====
Incumbent Democrat William Wainwright has represented the 12th district and its predecessors since 1991.

North Carolina House of Representatives 12th district general election, 2008
Party	Candidate	Votes	%
Democratic	William Wainwright (incumbent)	17,659	69.14%
Republican	Mark W. Griffin	7,882	30.86%
Total votes		25,541	100%
Democratic hold			

==== District 13 ====
Incumbent Republican Pat McElraft has represented the 13th district since 2007.

North Carolina House of Representatives 13th district general election, 2008
Party	Candidate	Votes	%
Republican	Pat McElraft (incumbent)	22,022	56.85%
Democratic	Barbara Garrity-Blake	16,714	43.15%
Total votes		38,736	100%
Republican hold			

==== District 14 ====
Incumbent Republican George Cleveland has represented the 14th district since 2005.

North Carolina House of Representatives 14th district general election, 2008
Party	Candidate	Votes	%
Republican	George Cleveland (incumbent)	16,926	100%
Total votes		16,926	100%
Republican hold			

==== District 15 ====
Incumbent Republican Robert Grady has represented the 15th district and its predecessors since 1987.

North Carolina House of Representatives 15th district general election, 2008
Party	Candidate	Votes	%
Republican	Robert Grady (incumbent)	11,015	100%
Total votes		11,015	100%
Republican hold			

==== District 16 ====
Incumbent Republican Carolyn Justice has represented the 16th district since 2003.

North Carolina House of Representatives 16th district general election, 2008
Party	Candidate	Votes	%
Republican	Carolyn Justice (incumbent)	33,154	100%
Total votes		33,154	100%
Republican hold			

==== District 17 ====
Incumbent Republican Bonner Stiller has represented the 17th district since 2003.

North Carolina House of representatives 17th district general election, 2008
Party	Candidate	Votes	%
Republican	Bonner Stiller (incumbent)	28,009	61.97%
Democratic	Vernon Ward	17,186	38.03%
Total votes		45,195	100%
Republican hold			

==== District 18 ====
Incumbent Democrat Sandra Hughes has represented the 18th district since 2008.

North Carolina House of Representatives 18th district general election, 2008
Party	Candidate	Votes	%
Democratic	Sandra Hughes (incumbent)	20,243	67.18%
Republican	George J. Swart	9,888	32.82%
Total votes		30,131	100%
Democratic hold			

==== District 19 ====
Incumbent Republican Danny McComas has represented the 19th district and its predecessors since 1995.

North Carolina House of Representatives 19th district general election, 2008
Party	Candidate	Votes	%
Republican	Danny McComas (incumbent)	31,354	100%
Total votes		31,354	100%
Republican hold			

=== Districts 20-39 ===
==== District 20 ====
Incumbent Democrat Dewey Hill has represented the 20th district and its predecessors since 1993.

North Carolina House of Representatives 20th district general election, 2008
Party	Candidate	Votes	%
Democratic	Dewey Hill (incumbent)	22,687	100%
Total votes		22,687	100%
Democratic hold			

==== District 21 ====
Incumbent Democrat Larry Bell has represented the 21st district and its predecessors since 2001.

North Carolina House of Representatives 21st district general election, 2008
Party	Candidate	Votes	%
Democratic	Larry Bell (incumbent)	21,964	100%
Total votes		21,964	100%
Democratic hold			

==== District 22 ====
Incumbent Democrat William Brisson has represented the 22nd district since 2007.

North Carolina House of Representatives 22nd district general election, 2008
Party	Candidate	Votes	%
Democratic	William Brisson (incumbent)	25,417	100%
Total votes		25,417	100%
Democratic hold			

==== District 23 ====
Incumbent Democrat Joe Tolson has represented the 23rd district and its predecessors since 1997.

North Carolina House of Representatives 23rd district general election, 2008
Party	Candidate	Votes	%
Democratic	Joe Tolson (incumbent)	20,211	62.21%
Republican	Garland Shepheard	12,275	37.79%
Total votes		32,486	100%
Democratic hold			

==== District 24 ====
Incumbent Democrat Jean Farmer-Butterfield has represented the 24th district since 2003.

North Carolina House of Representatives 24th district general election, 2008
Party	Candidate	Votes	%
Democratic	Jean Farmer-Butterfield (incumbent)	23,108	100%
Total votes		23,108	100%
Democratic hold			

==== District 25 ====
Incumbent Republican Bill Daughtridge has represented the 25th district since 2003. Daughtridge ran for State Treasurer. Democrat Randy Stewart won the open seat.

North Carolina House of Representatives 25th district general election, 2008
Party	Candidate	Votes	%
Democratic	Randy Stewart	19,581	54.93%
Republican	W. B. Bullock	16,067	45.07%
Total votes		35,648	100%
Democratic gain from Republican			

==== District 26 ====
Incumbent Republican Leo Daughtry has represented the 26th district and its predecessors since 1993.

North Carolina House of Representatives 26th district general election, 2008
Party	Candidate	Votes	%
Republican	Leo Daughtry (incumbent)	21,709	54.72%
Democratic	Jimmy F. Garner	17,964	45.28%
Total votes		39,673	100%
Republican hold			

==== District 27 ====
Incumbent Democrat Michael Wray has represented the 27th district since 2005.

North Carolina House of Representatives 27th district general election, 2008
Party	Candidate	Votes	%
Democratic	Michael Wray (incumbent)	27,387	100%
Total votes		27,387	100%
Democratic hold			

==== District 28 ====
Incumbent Republican James Langdon Jr. has represented the 28th district since 2005.

North Carolina House of Representatives 28th district general election, 2008
Party	Candidate	Votes	%
Republican	James Langdon Jr. (incumbent)	27,954	100%
Total votes		27,954	100%
Republican hold			

==== District 29 ====
Incumbent Democrat Larry Hall has represented the 29th district since 2006.

North Carolina House of Representatives 29th district general election, 2008
Party	Candidate	Votes	%
Democratic	Larry Hall (incumbent)	31,254	90.73%
Libertarian	Justin Lallinger	3,219	9.27%
Total votes		34,473	100%
Democratic hold			

==== District 30 ====
Incumbent Democrat Paul Luebke has represented the 30th district and its predecessors since 1991.

North Carolina House of Representatives 30th district general election, 2008
Party	Candidate	Votes	%
Democratic	Paul Luebke (incumbent)	25,265	85.78%
Libertarian	Sean Haugh	4,189	14.22%
Total votes		29,454	100%
Democratic hold			

==== District 31 ====
Incumbent Democrat Mickey Michaux has represented the 31st district and its predecessors since 1985.

North Carolina House of Representatives 31st district general election, 2008
Party	Candidate	Votes	%
Democratic	Mickey Michaux (incumbent)	34,609	100%
Total votes		34,609	100%
Democratic hold			

==== District 32 ====
Incumbent Democrat Jim Crawford has represented the 32nd district and its predecessors since 1995.

North Carolina House of Representatives 32nd district general election, 2008
Party	Candidate	Votes	%
Democratic	Jim Crawford (incumbent)	23,934	87.81%
Libertarian	Barbara Howe	3,322	12.19%
Total votes		27,256	100%
Democratic hold			

==== District 33 ====
Incumbent Democrat Dan Blue has represented the 33rd district since 2003.

North Carolina House of Representatives 33rd district general election, 2008
Party	Candidate	Votes	%
Democratic	Dan Blue (incumbent)	32,466	81.85%
Republican	Paul F. Terrell III	7,199	18.15%
Total votes		39,665	100%
Democratic hold			

==== District 34 ====
Incumbent Democrat Grier Martin has represented the 34th district since 2005.

North Carolina House of Representatives 34th district general election, 2008
Party	Candidate	Votes	%
Democratic	Grier Martin (incumbent)	24,065	59.91%
Republican	J. H. Ross	16,102	40.09%
Total votes		40,167	100%
Democratic hold			

==== District 35 ====
Incumbent Democrat Jennifer Weiss has represented the 35th district and its predecessors since 1999.

North Carolina House of Representatives 35th district general election, 2008
Party	Candidate	Votes	%
Democratic	Jennifer Weiss (incumbent)	23,633	65.10%
Republican	Eric Weaver	12,667	34.90%
Total votes		36,300	100%
Democratic hold			

==== District 36 ====
Incumbent Republican Nelson Dollar has represented the 36th district since 2005.

North Carolina House of Representatives 36th district general election, 2008
Party	Candidate	Votes	%
Republican	Nelson Dollar (incumbent)	21,862	51.16%
Democratic	Al Swanstrom	20,872	48.84%
Total votes		42,734	100%
Republican hold			

==== District 37 ====
Incumbent Republican Minority Leader Paul Stam has represented the 37th district since 2003.

North Carolina House of Representatives 37th district general election, 2008
Party	Candidate	Votes	%
Republican	Paul Stam (incumbent)	32,172	53.91%
Democratic	Ed Ridpath	27,503	46.09%
Total votes		59,675	100%
Republican hold			

==== District 38 ====
Incumbent Democrat Deborah Ross has represented the 38th district since 2003.

North Carolina House of Representatives 38th district general election, 2008
Party	Candidate	Votes	%
Democratic	Deborah Ross (incumbent)	26,754	84.88%
Libertarian	Susan J. Hogarth	4,764	15.12%
Total votes		31,518	100%
Democratic hold			

==== District 39 ====
Incumbent Democrat Linda Coleman has represented the 39th district since 2005.

North Carolina House of Representatives 39th district general election, 2008
Party	Candidate	Votes	%
Democratic	Linda Coleman (incumbent)	29,290	64.24%
Republican	Duane Cutlip	16,306	35.76%
Total votes		45,596	100%
Democratic hold			

=== Districts 40-59 ===
==== District 40 ====
Incumbent Republican Marilyn Avila has represented the 40th district since 2007.

North Carolina House of Representatives 40th district general election, 2008
Party	Candidate	Votes	%
Republican	Marilyn Avila (incumbent)	35,764	56.68%
Democratic	Stan Morse	27,336	43.32%
Total votes		63,100	100%
Republican hold			

==== District 41 ====
Incumbent Democrat Ty Harrell has represented the 41st district since 2007.

North Carolina House of Representatives 41st district general election, 2008
Party	Candidate	Votes	%
Democratic	Ty Harrell (incumbent)	30,929	53.77%
Republican	Bryan Gossage	26,595	46.23%
Total votes		57,524	100%
Democratic hold			

==== District 42 ====
Incumbent Democrat Marvin Lucas has represented the 42nd district and its predecessors since 2001.

North Carolina House of Representatives 42nd district general election, 2008
Party	Candidate	Votes	%
Democratic	Marvin Lucas (incumbent)	19,137	100%
Total votes		19,137	100%
Democratic hold			

==== District 43 ====
Incumbent Democrat Mary McAllister has represented the 43rd district and its predecessors since 1991. McAllister lost re-nomination to fellow Democrat Elmer Floyd. Floyd won the open seat.

North Carolina House of Representatives 43rd district general election, 2008
Party	Candidate	Votes	%
Democratic	Elmer Floyd	16,807	99.31%
Write-in		117	0.69%
Total votes		16,924	100%
Democratic hold			

==== District 44 ====
Incumbent Democrat Margaret Dickson has represented the 44th district and its predecessors since 2003

North Carolina House of Representatives 44th district general election, 2008
Party	Candidate	Votes	%
Democratic	Margaret Dickson (incumbent)	17,260	61.59%
Republican	Lou Huddleston	10,763	38.41%
Total votes		28,023	100%
Democratic hold			

==== District 45 ====
Incumbent Democrat Rick Glazier has represented the 45th district since 2003.

North Carolina House of Representatives 45th district general election, 2008
Party	Candidate	Votes	%
Democratic	Rick Glazier (incumbent)	24,225	100%
Total votes		24,225	100%
Democratic hold			

==== District 46 ====
Incumbent Democrat Douglas Yongue has represented the 46th district and its predecessors since 1994.

North Carolina House of Representatives 46th district general election, 2008
Party	Candidate	Votes	%
Democratic	Douglas Yongue (incumbent)	18,275	100%
Total votes		18,275	100%
Democratic hold			

==== District 47 ====
Incumbent Democrat Ronnie Sutton has represented the 47th district since 1995.

North Carolina House of Representatives 47th district general election, 2008
Party	Candidate	Votes	%
Democratic	Ronnie Sutton (incumbent)	17,238	100%
Total votes		17,238	100%
Democratic hold			

==== District 48 ====
Incumbent Democrat Garland Pierce has represented the 48th district since 2005.

North Carolina House of Representatives 48th district general election, 2008
Party	Candidate	Votes	%
Democratic	Garland Pierce (incumbent)	20,362	100%
Total votes		20,362	100%
Democratic hold			

==== District 49 ====
Incumbent Democrat Lucy Allen has represented the 49th district since 2003.

North Carolina House of Representatives 49th district general election, 2008
Party	Candidate	Votes	%
Democratic	Lucy Allen (incumbent)	19,598	58.59%
Republican	Keith Shearon	13,852	41.41%
Total votes		33,450	100%
Democratic hold			

==== District 50 ====
Incumbent Democrat Bill Faison has represented the 50th district since 2005.

North Carolina House of Representatives 50th district general election, 2008
Party	Candidate	Votes	%
Democratic	Bill Faison (incumbent)	25,682	100%
Total votes		25,682	100%
Democratic hold			

==== District 51 ====
Incumbent Democrat Jimmy Love Sr. has represented the 51st district since 2007.

North Carolina House of Representatives 51st district general election, 2008
Party	Candidate	Votes	%
Democratic	Jimmy Love Sr. (incumbent)	19,231	59.18%
Republican	Linda Shook	13,264	40.82%
Total votes		32,495	100%
Democratic hold			

==== District 52 ====
Incumbent Republican Joe Boylan has represented the 52nd district since 2007. Boylan lost re-nomination to fellow Republican Jamie Boles. Boles won the open seat.

North Carolina House of Representatives 52nd district general election, 2008
Party	Candidate	Votes	%
Republican	Jamie Boles	27,727	65.89%
Democratic	Betty Mangum	14,355	34.11%
Total votes		42,082	100%
Republican hold			

==== District 53 ====
Incumbent Republican David Lewis has represented the 53rd district since 2003.

North Carolina House of Representatives 53rd district general election, 2008
Party	Candidate	Votes	%
Republican	David Lewis (incumbent)	16,135	52.79%
Democratic	Joseph Lindsey (Joe) Tart	14,431	47.21%
Total votes		30,566	100%
Republican hold			

==== District 54 ====
Incumbent Democrat Speaker of the House Joe Hackney has represented the 54th district and its predecessors since 1981.

North Carolina House of Representatives 54th district general election, 2008
Party	Candidate	Votes	%
Democratic	Joe Hackney (incumbent)	31,212	100%
Total votes		31,212	100%
Democratic hold			

==== District 55 ====
Incumbent Democrat Winkie Wilkins has represented the 55th district since 2005.

North Carolina House of Representatives 55th district general election, 2008
Party	Candidate	Votes	%
Democratic	Winkie Wilkins (incumbent)	27,774	100%
Total votes		27,774	100%
Democratic hold			

==== District 56 ====
Incumbent Democrat Verla Insko has represented the 56th district and its predecessors since 1997.

North Carolina House of Representatives 56th district general election, 2008
Party	Candidate	Votes	%
Democratic	Verla Insko (incumbent)	30,835	100%
Total votes		30,835	100%
Democratic hold			

==== District 57 ====
Incumbent Democrat Pricey Harrison has represented the 57th district since 2005.

North Carolina House of Representatives 57th district general election, 2008
Party	Candidate	Votes	%
Democratic	Pricey Harrison (incumbent)	25,769	100%
Total votes		25,769	100%
Democratic hold			

==== District 58 ====
Incumbent Democrat Alma Adams has represented the 58th district and its predecessors since 1994.

North Carolina House of Representatives 58th district general election, 2008
Party	Candidate	Votes	%
Democratic	Alma Adams (incumbent)	29,113	71.35%
Republican	Olga Morgan Wright	11,690	28.65%
Total votes		40,803	100%
Democratic hold			

==== District 59 ====
Incumbent Democrat Maggie Jeffus has represented the 59th district since 1991.

North Carolina House of Representatives 58th district general election, 2008
Party	Candidate	Votes	%
Democratic	Maggie Jeffus (incumbent)	25,193	64.17%
Republican	Jim Rumley	14,066	35.83%
Total votes		39,259	100%
Democratic hold			

=== Districts 60-79 ===
==== District 60 ====
Incumbent Democrat Earl Jones has represented the 60th district since 2003.

North Carolina House of Representatives 58th district general election, 2008
Party	Candidate	Votes	%
Democratic	Earl Jones (incumbent)	23,964	100%
Total votes		23,964	100%
Democratic hold			

==== District 61 ====
Incumbent Republican Laura Wiley has represented the 61st District since 2005.

North Carolina House of Representatives 61st district general election, 2008
Party	Candidate	Votes	%
Republican	Laura Wiley (incumbent)	26,777	100%
Total votes		26,777	100%
Republican hold			

==== District 62 ====
Incumbent Republican John Blust has represented the 62nd District and its predecessors since 2001.

North Carolina House of Representatives 62nd district general election, 2008
Party	Candidate	Votes	%
Republican	John Blust (incumbent)	33,472	100%
Total votes		33,472	100%
Republican hold			

==== District 63 ====
Incumbent Democrat Alice Bordsen has represented the 63rd District since 2003.

North Carolina House of Representatives 63rd district general election, 2008
Party	Candidate	Votes	%
Democratic	Alice Bordsen (incumbent)	16,658	62.70%
Republican	Celo Faucette	9,909	37.30%
Total votes		26,567	100%
Democratic hold			

==== District 64 ====
Incumbent Republican Cary Allred has represented the 64th District and its predecessors since 1995.

North Carolina House of Representatives 64th district general election, 2008
Party	Candidate	Votes	%
Republican	Cary Allred (incumbent)	22,122	61.38%
Democratic	Henry Vines	13,919	38.62%
Total votes		36,041	100%
Republican hold			

==== District 65 ====
Incumbent Democrat Nelson Cole has represented the 65th District since and its predecessors since 1997.

North Carolina House of Representatives 65th district general election, 2008
Party	Candidate	Votes	%
Democratic	Nelson Cole (incumbent)	20,495	100%
Total votes		20,495	100%
Democratic hold			

==== District 66 ====
Incumbent Democrat Melanie Wade Goodwin has represented the 66th District since 2005.

North Carolina House of Representatives 66th district general election, 2008
Party	Candidate	Votes	%
Democratic	Melanie Wade Goodwin (incumbent)	22,173	100%
Total votes		22,173	100%
Democratic hold			

==== District 67 ====
Incumbent Republican Kenny Furr has represented the 67th District since his appointment in 2007. Furr lost re-nomination to fellow Republican Justin Burr. Burr won the general election.

North Carolina House of Representatives 67th district general election, 2008
Party	Candidate	Votes	%
Republican	Justin Burr	26,174	100%
Total votes		26,174	100%
Republican hold			

==== District 68 ====
Incumbent Republican Curtis Blackwood has represented the 68th District since 2003.

North Carolina House of Representatives 68th district general election, 2008
Party	Candidate	Votes	%
Republican	Curtis Blackwood (incumbent)	38,071	64.70%
Democratic	C. Michael (Mike) Cognac	20,767	35.30%
Total votes		58,838	100%
Republican hold			

==== District 69 ====
Incumbent Democrat Pryor Gibson has represented the 69th district and its predecessors since 1999.

North Carolina House of Representatives 69th district general election, 2008
Party	Candidate	Votes	%
Democratic	Pryor Gibson (incumbent)	18,489	65.71%
Republican	John L. Barker	9,648	34.29%
Total votes		28,137	100%
Democratic hold			

==== District 70 ====
Incumbent Republican Pat Hurley has represented the 70th District since 2007.

North Carolina House of Representatives 70th district general election, 2008
Party	Candidate	Votes	%
Republican	Pat Hurley (incumbent)	19,318	67.35%
Democratic	Bev O’Brien	9,364	32.65%
Total votes		28,682	100%
Republican hold			

==== District 71 ====
Incumbent Democrat Larry Womble has represented the 71st District and its predecessors since 1995.

North Carolina House of Representatives 71st district general election, 2008
Party	Candidate	Votes	%
Democratic	Larry Womble (incumbent)	21,583	90.02%
Libertarian	Bobby Richmond	2,393	9.98%
Total votes		23,976	100%
Democratic hold			

==== District 72 ====
Incumbent Democrat Earline Parmon has represented the 72nd District since 2003.

North Carolina House of Representatives 72nd district general election, 2008
Party	Candidate	Votes	%
Democratic	Earline Parmon (incumbent)	22,474	100%
Total votes		22,474	100%
Democratic hold			

==== District 73 ====
Incumbent Republican Larry Brown has represented the 73rd district since 2005.

North Carolina House of Representatives 73rd district general election, 2008
Party	Candidate	Votes	%
Republican	Larry Brown (incumbent)	26,636	83.80%
Libertarian	Cary Morris	5,151	16.20%
Total votes		31,787	100%
Republican hold			

==== District 74 ====
Incumbent Republican Dale Folwell has represented the 74th District since 2005.

North Carolina House of Representatives 74th district general election, 2008
Party	Candidate	Votes	%
Republican	Dale Folwell (incumbent)	21,933	59.25%
Democratic	Wade Boyles	15,086	40.75%
Total votes		37,019	100%
Republican hold			

==== District 75 ====
Incumbent Republican Bill McGee has represented the 75th District and its predecessors since 1990.

North Carolina House of Representatives 75th district general election, 2008
Party	Candidate	Votes	%
Republican	Bill McGee (incumbent)	22,697	57.53%
Democratic	Dan Bennett	16,758	42.47%
Total votes		39,455	100%
Republican hold			

==== District 76 ====
Incumbent Republican Fred Steen II has represented the 76th District since 2004.

North Carolina House of Representatives 76th district general election, 2008
Party	Candidate	Votes	%
Republican	Fred Steen II (incumbent)	24,059	100%
Total votes		24,059	100%
Republican hold			

==== District 77 ====
Incumbent Democrat Lorene Coates has represented the 77th District since and its predecessors since 2001.

North Carolina House of Representatives 77th district general election, 2008
Party	Candidate	Votes	%
Democratic	Lorene Coates (incumbent)	20,050	66.85%
Republican	Ada M. Fisher	9,942	33.15%
Total votes		29,992	100%
Democratic hold			

==== District 78 ====
Incumbent Republican Harold Brubaker has represented the 78th District and its predecessors since 1977.

North Carolina House of Representatives 78th district general election, 2008
Party	Candidate	Votes	%
Republican	Harold Brubaker (incumbent)	22,438	100%
Total votes		22,438	100%
Republican hold			

==== District 79 ====
Incumbent Republican Julia Craven Howard has represented the 79th District and its predecessors since 1989.

North Carolina House of Representatives 79th district general election, 2008
Party	Candidate	Votes	%
Republican	Julia Craven Howard (incumbent)	25,401	100%
Total votes		25,401	100%
Republican hold			

=== Districts 80-99 ===
==== District 80 ====
Incumbent Republican Jerry Dockham has represented the 80th district and its predecessors since 1991.

North Carolina House of Representatives 80th district general election, 2008
Party	Candidate	Votes	%
Republican	Jerry Dockham (incumbent)	27,537	100%
Total votes		27,537	100%
Republican hold			

==== District 81 ====
Incumbent Democratic Majority Leader Hugh Holliman has represented the 81st District and its predecessors since 2001.

North Carolina House of Representatives 81st district general election, 2008
Party	Candidate	Votes	%
Democratic	Hugh Holliman (incumbent)	12,975	52.64%
Republican	Rayne Brown	11,673	47.36%
Total votes		24,648	100%
Democratic hold			

==== District 82 ====
Incumbent Republican Jeff Barnhart has represented the 82nd District since 2001.

North Carolina House of Representatives 82nd district general election, 2008
Party	Candidate	Votes	%
Republican	Jeff Barnhart (incumbent)	21,403	54.81%
Democratic	Wayne Troutman	17,645	45.19%
Total votes		39,048	100%
Republican hold			

==== District 83 ====
Incumbent Republican Linda Johnson has represented the 83rd District and its predecessors since 2001.

North Carolina House of Representatives 83rd district general election, 2008
Party	Candidate	Votes	%
Republican	Linda Johnson (incumbent)	22,333	62.46%
Democratic	Barry G. Richards	13,425	37.54%
Total votes		35,758	100%
Republican hold			

==== District 84 ====
North Carolina House of Representatives 84th district general election, 2008
Party	Candidate	Votes	%
Republican	Phillip Frye (incumbent)	20,412	100%
Total votes		20,412	100%
Republican hold			

==== District 85 ====
Incumbent Republican Mitch Gillespie has represented the 85th District since 1999.

North Carolina House of Representatives 85th district general election, 2008
Party	Candidate	Votes	%
Republican	Mitch Gillespie (incumbent)	16,432	59.24%
Democratic	Chuck Aldridge	11,304	40.76%
Total votes		27,736	100%
Republican hold			

==== District 86 ====
Incumbent Democrat Walt Church has represented the 86th District and its predecessors since 1993. Church lost re-election to Republican Hugh Blackwell.

North Carolina House of Representatives 86th district general election, 2008
Party	Candidate	Votes	%
Republican	Hugh Blackwell	14,140	51.61%
Democratic	Walt Church (incumbent)	13,259	48.39%
Total votes		27,399	100%
Republican gain from Democratic			

==== District 87 ====
Incumbent Republican Edgar Starnes has represented the 87th District and its predecessors since 1997.

North Carolina House of Representatives 87th district general election, 2008
Party	Candidate	Votes	%
Republican	Edgar Starnes (incumbent)	15,444	52.76%
Democratic	John A. Forlines Jr.	11,487	39.24%
Libertarian	Timothy J. (T.J.) Rohr	2,342	8.00%
Total votes		29,273	100%
Republican hold			

==== District 88 ====
Incumbent Democrat Ray Warren has represented the 88th district since 2007.

North Carolina House of Representatives 88th district general election, 2008
Party	Candidate	Votes	%
Democratic	Ray Warren (incumbent)	15,729	50.33%
Republican	Mark Hollo	15,520	49.67%
Total votes		31,249	100%
Democratic hold			

==== District 89 ====
Incumbent Republican Mitchell Setzer has represented the 89th District and its predecessors since 1999.

North Carolina House of Representatives 89th district general election, 2008
Party	Candidate	Votes	%
Republican	Mitchell Setzer (incumbent)	25,176	100%
Total votes		25,176	100%
Republican hold			

==== District 90 ====
Incumbent Democrat Jim Harrell has represented the 90th District since 2003. Harrell lost re-election to Republican Sarah Stevens.

North Carolina House of Representatives 90th district general election, 2008
Party	Candidate	Votes	%
Republican	Sarah Stevens	13,263	50.58%
Democratic	Jim Harrell (incumbent)	12,957	49.42%
Total votes		26,220	100%
Republican gain from Democratic			

==== District 91 ====
Incumbent Republican Bryan Holloway has represented the 91st District since 2005.

North Carolina House of Representatives 91st district general election, 2008
Party	Candidate	Votes	%
Republican	Bryan Holloway (incumbent)	21,338	65.48%
Democratic	Ed Gambill	11,251	34.52%
Total votes		32,589	100%
Republican hold			

==== District 92 ====
Incumbent Republican George Holmes has represented the 92nd district and its predecessors since 1979. Holmes didn't seek re-election and Republican Darrell McCormick won the open seat.

North Carolina House of Representatives 92nd district general election, 2008
Party	Candidate	Votes	%
Republican	Darrell McCormick	18,219	63.16%
Democratic	Ric Marshall	10,626	36.84%
Total votes		28,845	100%
Republican hold			

==== District 93 ====
Incumbent Democrat Cullie Tarleton has represented the 93rd district since 2007.

North Carolina House of Representatives 93rd district general election, 2008
Party	Candidate	Votes	%
Democratic	Cullie Tarleton (incumbent)	20,765	51.66%
Republican	Dan Soucek	17,822	44.34%
Libertarian	Jeff Cannon	1,607	4.00%
Total votes		40,194	100%
Democratic hold			

==== District 94 ====
Incumbent Republican Tracy Walker has represented the 94th District and its predecessors since 2001. Walker didn't seek re-election and Republican Shirley Randleman won the open seat.

North Carolina House of Representatives 94th district general election, 2008
Party	Candidate	Votes	%
Republican	Shirley Randleman	17,578	60.38%
Democratic	Larry Pendry	11,533	39.62%
Total votes		29,111	100%
Republican hold			

==== District 95 ====
Incumbent Republican Karen Ray has represented the 95th District since 2003. Ray lost re-nomination to fellow Republican Grey Mills. Mills won the open seat.

North Carolina House of Representatives 95th district general election, 2008
Party	Candidate	Votes	%
Republican	Grey Mills	27,895	82.43%
Libertarian	Jeffrey Ober	5,304	15.67%
Write-in		643	1.90%
Total votes		33,842	100%
Republican hold			

==== District 96 ====
Incumbent Republican Mark Hilton has represented the 96th District and its predecessors since 2001.

North Carolina House of Representatives 96th district general election, 2008
Party	Candidate	Votes	%
Republican	Mark Hilton (incumbent)	20,810	84.81%
Libertarian	Lawrence G. Hollar	3,727	15.19%
Total votes		24,537	100%
Republican hold			

==== District 97 ====
Incumbent Republican Joe Kiser has represented the 97th District and its predecessors since 1995, Kiser didn't seek re-election. Republican Jonathan Rhyne Jr. won the open seat.

North Carolina House of Representatives 97th district general election, 2008
Party	Candidate	Votes	%
Republican	Jonathan Rhyne Jr.	25,765	100%
Total votes		25,765	100%
Republican hold			

==== District 98 ====
Incumbent Republican Thom Tillis has represented the 98th District since 2007.

North Carolina House of Representatives 98th district general election, 2008
Party	Candidate	Votes	%
Republican	Thom Tillis (incumbent)	38,875	100%
Total votes		38,875	100%
Republican hold			

==== District 99 ====
Incumbent Democrat Drew Saunders has represented the 99th District and its predecessors since 1997. Saunders lost re-nomination to fellow Democrat Nick Mackey. Mackey won the general election.

North Carolina House of Representatives 99th district general election, 2008
Party	Candidate	Votes	%
Democratic	Nick Mackey	28,106	65.32%
Republican	Dempsey Miller	14,925	34.68%
Total votes		43,031	100%
Democratic hold			

=== Districts 100-120 ===
==== District 100 ====
Incumbent Democrat Tricia Cotham has represented the 100th District since 2007.

North Carolina House of Representatives 100th district general election, 2008
Party	Candidate	Votes	%
Democratic	Tricia Cotham (incumbent)	19,548	74.07%
Republican	Tom White	6,843	25.93%
Total votes		26,391	100%
Democratic hold			

==== District 101 ====
Incumbent Democrat Beverly Earle has represented the 101st District and its predecessors since 1995.

North Carolina House of Representatives 101st district general election, 2008
Party	Candidate	Votes	%
Democratic	Beverly Earle (incumbent)	30,195	79.29%
Republican	Beth Marlin	7,886	20.71%
Total votes		38,081	100%
Democratic hold			

==== District 102 ====
Incumbent Democrat Becky Carney has represented the 102nd District since 2003.

North Carolina House of Representatives 102nd district general election, 2008
Party	Candidate	Votes	%
Democratic	Becky Carney (incumbent)	21,705	80.72%
Republican	Gregory Patrick Hill	5,183	19.28%
Total votes		26,888	100%
Democratic hold			

==== District 103 ====
Incumbent Republican Jim Gulley has represented the 103rd District and its predecessors since 1997.

North Carolina House of Representatives 103rd district general election, 2008
Party	Candidate	Votes	%
Republican	Jim Gulley (incumbent)	20,798	69.37%
Independent	Mark Brody	9,184	30.63%
Total votes		29,982	100%
Republican hold			

==== District 104 ====
Incumbent Republican Ruth Samuelson has represented the 104th District since 2007.

North Carolina House of Representatives 104th district general election, 2008
Party	Candidate	Votes	%
Republican	Ruth Samuelson (incumbent)	29,349	100%
Total votes		29,349	100%
Republican hold			

==== District 105 ====
Incumbent Republican Ric Killian has represented the 105th District since 2007.

North Carolina House of Representatives 105th district general election, 2008
Party	Candidate	Votes	%
Republican	Ric Killian (incumbent)	35,879	100%
Total votes		35,879	100%
Republican hold			

==== District 106 ====
Incumbent Democrat Martha Alexander has represented the 106th district and its predecessors since 1999.

North Carolina House of Representatives 106th district general election, 2008
Party	Candidate	Votes	%
Democratic	Martha Alexander (incumbent)	23,422	100%
Total votes		23,422	100%
Democratic hold			

==== District 107 ====
Incumbent Democrat Pete Cunningham has represented the 107th District and its predecessors since 1987. Cunningham didn't seek re-election and Democrat Kelly Alexander won the open seat.

North Carolina House of Representatives 107th district general election, 2008
Party	Candidate	Votes	%
Democratic	Kelly Alexander	27,502	75.26%
Republican	Gary Hardee	9,043	24.74%
Total votes		36,545	100%
Democratic hold			

==== District 108 ====
Incumbent Republican Wil Neumann has represented the 108th District since 2007.

North Carolina House of Representatives 108th district general election, 2008
Party	Candidate	Votes	%
Republican	Wil Neumann (incumbent)	18,931	57.67%
Democratic	Marvin (Eddie) Wyatt	12,848	39.14%
Libertarian	Keith Calvelli	1,045	3.18%
Total votes		32,824	100%
Republican hold			

==== District 109 ====
Incumbent Republican William Current has represented the 109th District since 2005.

North Carolina House of Representatives 109th district general election, 2008
Party	Candidate	Votes	%
Republican	William Current (incumbent)	16,079	55.35%
Democratic	Shirley Wiggins	12,973	44.65%
Total votes		29,052	100%
Republican hold			

==== District 110 ====
Incumbent Republican Debbie Clary has represented the 110th District and its predecessors since 1995. Clary sought election to the State Senate. Republican Pearl Burris-Floyd won the open seat.

North Carolina House of Representatives 110th district general election, 2008
Party	Candidate	Votes	%
Republican	Pearl Burris-Floyd	14,683	50.88%
Democratic	Davy Lowman	14,173	49.12%
Total votes		28,856	100%
Republican hold			

==== District 111 ====
Incumbent Republican Tim Moore has represented the 111th District since 2003.

North Carolina House of Representatives 111th district general election, 2008
Party	Candidate	Votes	%
Republican	Tim Moore (incumbent)	20,077	100%
Total votes		20,077	100%
Republican hold			

==== District 112 ====
Incumbent Democrat Bob England has represented the 112th District since 2003.

North Carolina House of Representatives 112th district general election, 2008
Party	Candidate	Votes	%
Democratic	Bob England (incumbent)	23,362	100%
Total votes		23,362	100%
Democratic hold			

==== District 113 ====
Incumbent Republican Trudi Walend has represented the 113th District and its predecessors since 1999, Walend didn't seek re-election. Republican David Guice won the open seat.

North Carolina House of Representatives 113th district general election, 2008
Party	Candidate	Votes	%
Republican	David Guice	19,122	50.72%
Democratic	Tom Thomas	18,579	49.28%
Total votes		37,701	100%
Republican hold			

==== District 114 ====
Incumbent Democrat Susan Fisher has represented the 114th District since 2004.

North Carolina House of Representatives 114th district general election, 2008
Party	Candidate	Votes	%
Democratic	Susan Fisher (incumbent)	28,286	100%
Total votes		28,286	100%
Democratic hold			

==== District 115 ====
Incumbent Democrat Bruce Goforth has represented the 115th District since 2003.

North Carolina House of Representatives 115th district general election, 2008
Party	Candidate	Votes	%
Democratic	Bruce Goforth (incumbent)	27,795	67.42%
Republican	Paul Purdue	13,429	32.58%
Total votes		41,224	100%
Democratic hold			

==== District 116 ====
Incumbent Republican Charles Thomas has represented the 116th district since 2007. Thomas didn't seek re-election and Democrat Jane Whilden won the open seat.

North Carolina House of Representatives 116th district general election, 2008
Party	Candidate	Votes	%
Democratic	Jane Whilden	20,019	51.70%
Republican	Tim Moffitt	18,704	48.30%
Total votes		38,723	100%
Democratic gain from Republican			

==== District 117 ====
Incumbent Republican Carolyn Justus has represented the 117th District since October 2002.

North Carolina House of Representatives 117th district general election, 2008
Party	Candidate	Votes	%
Republican	Carolyn Justus (incumbent)	23,277	60.34%
Democratic	Paul D. Goebel	15,300	39.66%
Total votes		38,577	100%
Republican hold			

==== District 118 ====
Incumbent Democrat Ray Rapp has represented the 118th District since 2003.

North Carolina House of Representatives 118th district general election, 2008
Party	Candidate	Votes	%
Democratic	Ray Rapp (incumbent)	23,920	100%
Total votes		23,920	100%
Democratic hold			

==== District 119 ====
Incumbent Democrat Phil Haire has represented the 119th District and its predecessors since 1999.

North Carolina House of Representatives 119th district general election, 2008
Party	Candidate	Votes	%
Democratic	Phil Haire (incumbent)	19,411	61.59%
Republican	Dodie Allen	12,104	38.41%
Total votes		31,515	100%
Democratic hold			

==== District 120 ====
Incumbent Republican Roger West has represented the 120th District and its predecessors since 2000.

North Carolina House of Representatives 120th district general election, 2008
Party	Candidate	Votes	%
Republican	Roger West (incumbent)	25,201	100%
Total votes		25,201	100%
Republican hold			

== See also ==
- List of North Carolina state legislatures
