= 2010 North Carolina House of Representatives election =

- November 2, 2010

All 120 seats in the North Carolina House of Representatives 61 seats needed for a majority
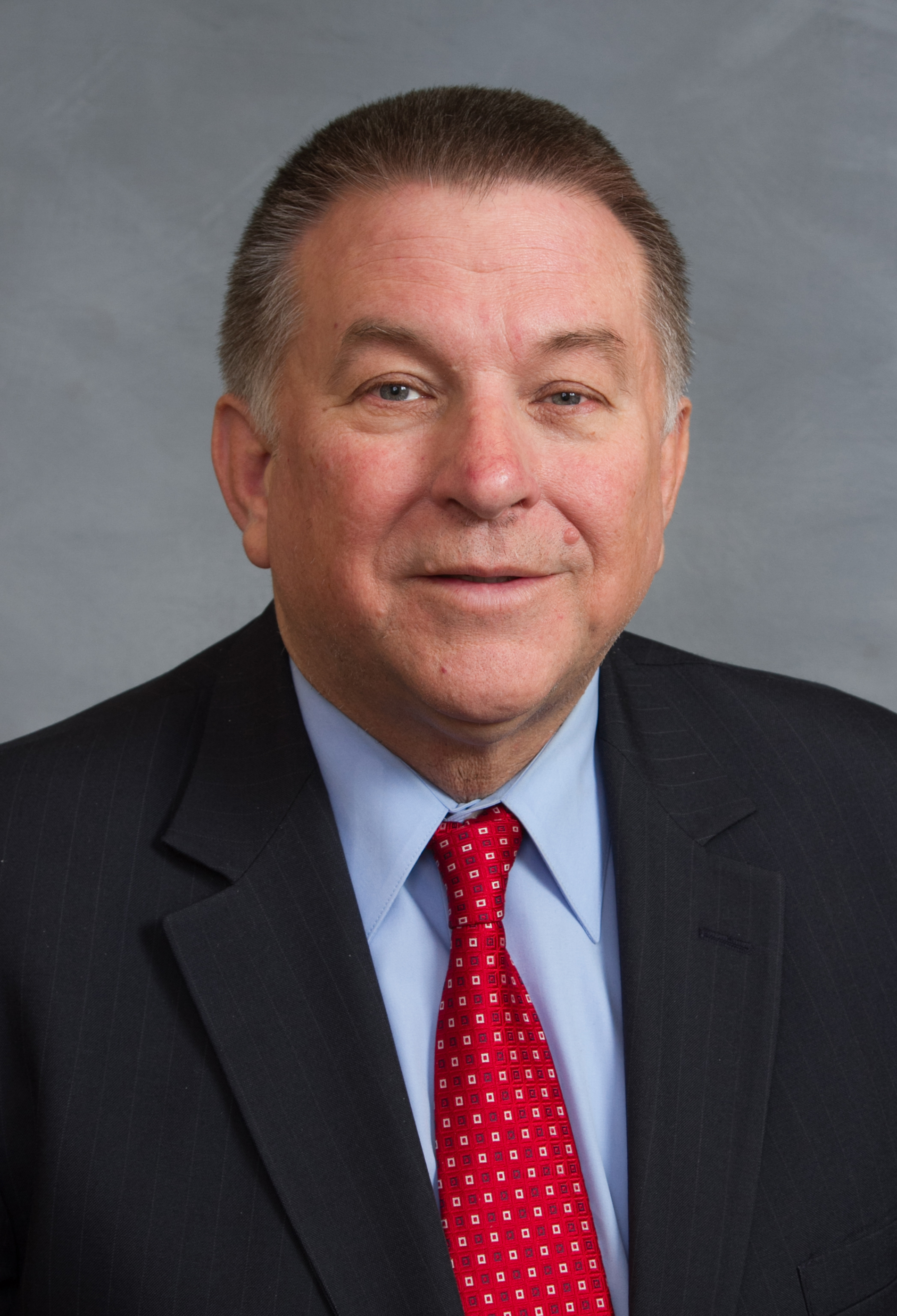

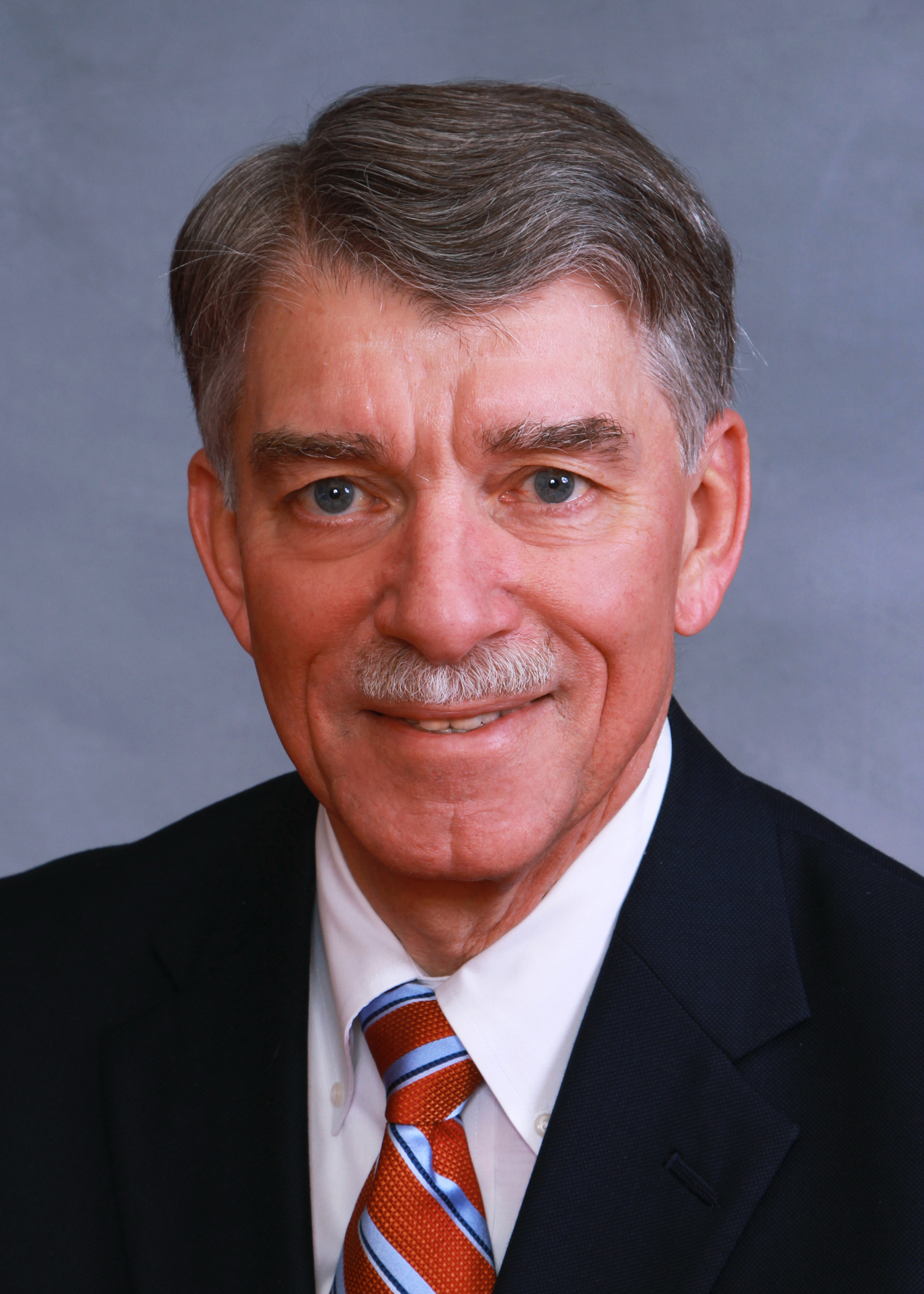
	Majority party	Minority party
Leader	Paul Stam	Joe Hackney
Party	Republican	Democratic
Leader since	January 1, 2007	January 1, 2007
Leader's seat	37th - Apex	54th - Chapel Hill
Last election	52	68
Seats won	68 (Note: Unaffiliated Bert Jones chose to caucus with the Republican Party.)	52
Seat change	▲16	▼16
- Results: Democratic hold Republican hold Republican gain Independent gain
Speaker before election
Joe Hackney
Democratic
Elected Speaker
Thom Tillis
Republican

An election was held on November 2, 2010 to elect all 120 members to North Carolina's House of Representatives. The election coincided with elections for other offices, including U.S. House of Representatives, and state senate. The primary election was held on May 4, 2010 with a primary run-off held on June 22, 2010.

== Results summary ==
District	Incumbent	Party	Elected	Party
1st	Bill Owens	Dem	Bill Owens	Dem
2nd	Timothy Spear	Dem	Timothy Spear	Dem
3rd	Alice Graham Underhill	Dem	Norman Sanderson	Rep
4th	Russell Tucker†	Dem	Jimmy Dixon	Rep
5th	Annie Mobley	Dem	Annie Mobley	Dem
6th	Arthur Williams	Dem	Bill Cook	Rep
7th	Angela Bryant	Dem	Angela Bryant	Dem
8th	Edith Warren	Dem	Edith Warren	Dem
9th	Marian McLawhorn	Dem	Marian McLawhorn	Dem
10th	Van Braxton	Dem	Stephen LaRoque	Rep
11th	Efton Sager	Rep	Efton Sager	Rep
12th	William Wainwright	Dem	William Wainwright	Dem
13th	Pat McElraft	Rep	Pat McElraft	Rep
14th	George Cleveland	Rep	George Cleveland	Rep
15th	Robert Grady†	Rep	Phil Shepard	Rep
16th	Carolyn Justice	Rep	Carolyn Justice	Rep
17th	Frank Iler	Rep	Frank Iler	Rep
18th	Sandra Hughes†	Dem	Susi Hamilton	Dem
19th	Danny McComas	Rep	Danny McComas	Rep
20th	Dewey Hill	Dem	Dewey Hill	Dem
21st	Larry Bell	Dem	Larry Bell	Dem
22nd	William Brisson	Dem	William Brisson	Dem
23rd	Joe Tolson	Dem	Joe Tolson	Dem
24th	Jean Farmer-Butterfield	Dem	Jean Farmer-Butterfield	Dem
25th	Randy Stewart	Dem	Jeff Collins	Rep
26th	Leo Daughtry	Rep	Leo Daughtry	Rep
27th	Michael Wray	Dem	Michael Wray	Dem
28th	James Langdon Jr.	Rep	James Langdon Jr.	Rep
29th	Larry Hall	Dem	Larry Hall	Dem
30th	Paul Luebke	Dem	Paul Luebke	Dem
31st	Mickey Michaux	Dem	Mickey Michaux	Dem
32nd	Jim Crawford	Dem	Jim Crawford	Dem
33rd	Rosa Gill	Dem	Rosa Gill	Dem
34th	Grier Martin	Dem	Grier Martin	Dem
35th	Jennifer Weiss	Dem	Jennifer Weiss	Dem
36th	Nelson Dollar	Rep	Nelson Dollar	Rep
37th	Paul Stam	Rep	Paul Stam	Rep
38th	Deborah Ross	Dem	Deborah Ross	Dem
39th	Darren Jackson	Dem	Darren Jackson	Dem
40th	Marilyn Avila	Rep	Marilyn Avila	Rep
41st	Chris Heagarty	Dem	Tom Murry	Rep
42nd	Marvin Lucas	Dem	Marvin Lucas	Dem
43rd	Elmer Floyd	Dem	Elmer Floyd	Dem
44th	Dianne Parfitt	Dem	Dianne Parfitt	Dem
45th	Rick Glazier	Dem	Rick Glazier	Dem
46th	Douglas Yongue	Dem	Gaston (G. L.) Pridgen	Rep
47th	Ronnie Sutton	Dem	Charles Graham	Dem
48th	Garland Pierce	Dem	Garland Pierce	Dem
49th	John May	Dem	Glen Bradley	Rep
50th	Bill Faison	Dem	Bill Faison	Dem
51st	Jimmy Love Sr.	Dem	Mike Stone	Rep
52nd	Jamie Boles	Rep	Jamie Boles	Rep
53rd	David Lewis	Rep	David Lewis	Rep
54th	Joe Hackney	Dem	Joe Hackney	Dem
55th	Winkie Wilkins	Dem	Winkie Wilkins	Dem
56th	Verla Insko	Dem	Verla Insko	Dem
57th	Pricey Harrison	Dem	Pricey Harrison	Dem
58th	Alma Adams	Dem	Alma Adams	Dem
59th	Maggie Jeffus	Dem	Maggie Jeffus	Dem
60th	Earl Jones	Dem	Marcus Brandon	Dem
61st	Laura Wiley†	Rep	John Faircloth	Rep
62nd	John Blust	Rep	John Blust	Rep
63rd	Alice Bordsen	Dem	Alice Bordsen	Dem
64th	Dan Ingle	Rep	Dan Ingle	Rep
65th	Nelson Cole	Dem	Bert Jones	Ind
66th	Melanie Wade Goodwin†	Dem	Ken Goodman	Dem
67th	Justin Burr	Rep	Justin Burr	Rep
68th	Curtis Blackwood†	Rep	Craig Horn	Rep
69th	Pryor Gibson	Dem	Pryor Gibson	Dem
70th	Pat Hurley	Rep	Pat Hurley	Rep
71st	Larry Womble	Dem	Larry Womble	Dem
72nd	Earline Parmon	Dem	Earline Parmon	Dem
73rd	Larry Brown	Rep	Larry Brown	Rep
74th	Dale Folwell	Rep	Dale Folwell	Rep
75th	Bill McGee	Rep	Bill McGee	Rep
76th	Fred Steen II	Rep	Fred Steen II	Rep
77th	Lorene Coates	Dem	Harry Warren	Rep
78th	Harold Brubaker	Rep	Harold Brubaker	Rep
79th	Julia Craven Howard	Rep	Julia Craven Howard	Rep
80th	Jerry Dockham	Rep	Jerry Dockham	Rep
81st	Hugh Holliman	Dem	Rayne Brown	Rep
82nd	Jeff Barnhart	Rep	Jeff Barnhart	Rep
83rd	Linda Johnson	Rep	Linda Johnson	Rep
84th	Phillip Frye	Rep	Phillip Frye	Rep
85th	Mitch Gillespie	Rep	Mitch Gillespie	Rep
86th	Hugh Blackwell	Rep	Hugh Blackwell	Rep
87th	Edgar Starnes	Rep	Edgar Starnes	Rep
88th	Ray Warren†	Dem	Mark Hollo	Rep
89th	Mitchell Setzer	Rep	Mitchell Setzer	Rep
90th	Sarah Stevens	Rep	Sarah Stevens	Rep
91st	Bryan Holloway	Rep	Bryan Holloway	Rep
92nd	Darrell McCormick	Rep	Darrell McCormick	Rep
93rd	Cullie Tarleton	Dem	Jonathan Jordan	Rep
94th	Shirley Randleman	Rep	Shirley Randleman	Rep
95th	Grey Mills	Rep	Grey Mills	Rep
96th	Mark Hilton	Rep	Mark Hilton	Rep
97th	Jonathan Rhyne Jr.	Rep	Jonathan Rhyne Jr.	Rep
98th	Thom Tillis	Rep	Thom Tillis	Rep
99th	Nick Mackey	Dem	Rodney Moore	Dem
100th	Tricia Cotham	Dem	Tricia Cotham	Dem
101st	Beverly Earle	Dem	Beverly Earle	Dem
102nd	Becky Carney	Dem	Becky Carney	Dem
103rd	Jim Gulley†	Rep	Bill Brawley	Rep
104th	Ruth Samuelson	Rep	Ruth Samuelson	Rep
105th	Ric Killian	Rep	Ric Killian	Rep
106th	Martha Alexander	Dem	Martha Alexander	Dem
107th	Kelly Alexander	Dem	Kelly Alexander	Dem
108th	Wil Neumann†	Rep	John Torbett	Rep
109th	William Current	Rep	William Current	Rep
110th	Pearl Burris-Floyd	Rep	Kelly Hastings	Rep
111th	Tim Moore	Rep	Tim Moore	Rep
112th	Bob England†	Dem	Mike Hager	Rep
113th	David Guice	Rep	David Guice	Rep
114th	Susan Fisher	Dem	Susan Fisher	Dem
115th	Patsy Keever	Dem	Patsy Keever	Dem
116th	Jane Whilden	Dem	Tim Moffitt	Rep
117th	Carolyn Justus†	Rep	Chuck McGrady	Rep
118th	Ray Rapp	Dem	Ray Rapp	Dem
119th	Phil Haire	Dem	Phil Haire	Dem
120th	Roger West	Rep	Roger West	Rep

† - Incumbent not seeking re-election

=== Incumbents defeated in primary election ===
- Ronnie Sutton (D-District 47), defeated by Charles Graham (D)
- Earl Jones (D-District 60), defeated by Marcus Brandon (D)
- Nick Mackey (D-District 99), defeated by Rodney Moore (D)
- Pearl Burris-Floyd (R-District 110), defeated by Kelly Hastings (R)

=== Incumbents defeated in general election ===
- Alice Graham Underhill (D-District 3), defeated by Norman Sanderson (R)
- Arthur Williams (D-District 6), defeated by Bill Cook (R)
- Van Braxton (D-District 10), defeated by Stephen LaRoque (R)
- Randy Stewart (D-District 25), defeated by Jeff Collins (R)
- Chris Heagarty (D-District 41), defeated by Tom Murry (R)
- Douglas Yongue (D-District 46), defeated by Gaston (G. L.) Pridgen (R)
- John May (D-District 49), defeated by Glen Bradley (R)
- Jimmy Love Sr. (D-District 51), defeated by Mike Stone (R)
- Nelson Cole (D-District 65), defeated by Bert Jones (I)
- Lorene Coates (D-District 77), defeated by Harry Warren (R)
- Hugh Holliman (D-District 81), defeated by Rayne Brown (R)
- Cullie Tarleton (D-District 93), defeated by Jonathan Jordan (R)
- Jane Whilden (D-District 116), defeated by Tim Moffitt (R)

=== Open seats that changed parties ===
- Russell Tucker (D-District 4) didn't seek re-election, seat won by Jimmy Dixon (R)
- Ray Warren (D-District 88) didn't seek re-election, seat won by Mark Hollo (R)
- Bob England (D-District 112) didn't seek re-election, seat won by Mike Hager (R)

== Predictions ==
Source	Ranking	As of
Governing	Tossup	November 1, 2010

== Detailed Results ==
=== Districts 1-19 ===
==== District 1 ====
Incumbent Democrat Bill Owens has represented the 1st District since 1995.

North Carolina House of Representatives 1st district general election, 2010
Party	Candidate	Votes	%
Democratic	Bill Owens (incumbent)	11,538	52.75%
Republican	John J. Woodard Jr.	10,336	47.25%
Total votes		21,874	100%
Democratic hold			

==== District 2 ====
Incumbent Democrat Timothy Spear has represented the 2nd district since 2006.

North Carolina House of Representatives 2nd district general election, 2010
Party	Candidate	Votes	%
Democratic	Timothy Spear (incumbent)	12,733	54.88%
Republican	Bob Steinburg	10,467	45.12%
Total votes		23,200	100%
Democratic hold			

==== District 3 ====
Incumbent Democrat Alice Graham Underhill has represented the 3rd district since 2005. Underhill was defeated for re-election by Republican Norman Sanderson.

North Carolina House of Representatives 3rd district general election, 2010
Party	Candidate	Votes	%
Republican	Norman Sanderson	14,620	63.69%
Democratic	Alice Graham Underhill (incumbent)	7,859	34.24%
Libertarian	Herb Sobel	477	2.08%
Total votes		22,956	100%
Republican gain from Democratic			

==== District 4 ====
Incumbent Democrat Russell Tucker has represented the 4th district since 2005. Tucker didn't seek re-election and Republican Jimmy Dixon won the open seat.

North Carolina House of Representatives 4th district general election, 2010
Party	Candidate	Votes	%
Republican	Jimmy Dixon	9,004	51.36%
Democratic	Mott Blair	8,527	48.64%
Total votes		17,531	100%
Republican gain from Democratic			

==== District 5 ====
Incumbent Democrat Annie Mobley has represented the 5th district since 2007.

North Carolina House of Representatives 5th district general election, 2010
Party	Candidate	Votes	%
Democratic	Annie Mobley (incumbent)	11,850	58.99%
Republican	Matthew (Matt) Peeler	8,237	41.01%
Total votes		20,087	100%
Democratic hold			

==== District 6 ====
Incumbent Democrat Arthur Williams has represented the 6th district since 2003. He was defeated for re-election by Republican Bill Cook.

North Carolina House of Representatives 6th district general election, 2010
Party	Candidate	Votes	%
Republican	Bill Cook	12,910	53.45%
Democratic	Arthur Williams (incumbent)	11,242	46.55%
Total votes		24,152	100%
Republican gain from Democratic			

==== District 7 ====
Incumbent Democrat Angela Bryant has represented the 7th district since 2007.

North Carolina House of Representatives 7th district general election, 2010
Party	Candidate	Votes	%
Democratic	Angela Bryant (incumbent)	12,544	100%
Total votes		12,544	100%
Democratic hold			

==== District 8 ====
Incumbent Democrat Edith Warren has represented the 8th district and its predecessors since 1999.

North Carolina House of Representatives 8th district general election, 2010
Party	Candidate	Votes	%
Democratic	Edith Warren (incumbent)	14,814	100%
Total votes		14,814	100%
Democratic hold			

==== District 9 ====
Incumbent Democrat Marian McLawhorn has represented the 9th district since 1999.

North Carolina House of representatives 9th district general election, 2010
Party	Candidate	Votes	%
Democratic	Marian McLawhorn (incumbent)	11,808	50.75%
Republican	Stan Larson	11,460	49.25%
Total votes		23,268	100%
Democratic hold			

==== District 10 ====
Incumbent Democrat Van Braxton has represented the 10th district since 2007. Braxton was defeated for re-election by Republican Stephen LaRoque, who himself had represented this district from 2003 to 2007.

North Carolina House of Representatives 10th district general election, 2010
Party	Candidate	Votes	%
Republican	Stephen LaRoque	11,802	57.23%
Democratic	Van Braxton (incumbent)	8,820	42.77%
Total votes		20,622	100%
Republican gain from Democratic			

==== District 11 ====
Incumbent Republican Efton Sager has represented the 11th district since 2009.

North Carolina House of Representatives 11th district general election, 2010
Party	Candidate	Votes	%
Republican	Efton Sager (incumbent)	15,409	100%
Total votes		15,409	100%
Republican hold			

==== District 12 ====
Incumbent Democrat William Wainwright has represented the 12th district and its predecessors since 1991.

North Carolina House of Representatives 12th district general election, 2010
Party	Candidate	Votes	%
Democratic	William Wainwright (incumbent)	9,390	60.21%
Republican	Mark W. Griffin	6,206	39.79%
Total votes		15,596	100%
Democratic hold			

==== District 13 ====
Incumbent Republican Pat McElraft has represented the 13th district since 2007.

North Carolina House of Representatives 13th district general election, 2010
Party	Candidate	Votes	%
Republican	Pat McElraft (incumbent)	19,491	73.26%
Democratic	Craig K. Hassler	7,113	26.74%
Total votes		26,604	100%
Republican hold			

==== District 14 ====
Incumbent Republican George Cleveland has represented the 14th district since 2005.

North Carolina House of Representatives 14th district general election, 2010
Party	Candidate	Votes	%
Republican	George Cleveland (incumbent)	8,961	100%
Total votes		8,961	100%
Republican hold			

==== District 15 ====
Incumbent Republican Robert Grady has represented the 15th district and its predecessors since 1987. Grady didn't seek re-election and Republican Phil Shepard won the open seat.

North Carolina House of Representatives 15th district general election, 2010
Party	Candidate	Votes	%
Republican	Phil Shepard	5,873	76.64%
Independent	George Shaeffer	1,790	23.36%
Total votes		7,663	100%
Republican hold			

==== District 16 ====
Incumbent Republican Carolyn Justice has represented the 16th district since 2003.

North Carolina House of Representatives 16th district general election, 2010
Party	Candidate	Votes	%
Republican	Carolyn Justice (incumbent)	21,630	69.89%
Democratic	Franklin (F. D.) Rivenbark	9,320	30.11%
Total votes		30,950	100%
Republican hold			

==== District 17 ====
Incumbent Republican Frank Iler has represented the 17th district since 2009.

North Carolina House of representatives 17th district general election, 2010
Party	Candidate	Votes	%
Republican	Frank Iler (incumbent)	24,065	68.35%
Democratic	James A. Knox	11,146	31.65%
Total votes		35,211	100%
Republican hold			

==== District 18 ====
Incumbent Democrat Sandra Hughes has represented the 18th district since 2008. Hughes didn't seek re-election and Democrat Susi Hamilton won the open seat.

North Carolina House of Representatives 18th district general election, 2010
Party	Candidate	Votes	%
Democratic	Susi Hamilton	10,097	57.05%
Republican	Beth Dawson	7,600	42.95%
Total votes		17,697	100%
Democratic hold			

==== District 19 ====
Incumbent Republican Danny McComas has represented the 19th district and its predecessors since 1995.

North Carolina House of Representatives 19th district general election, 2010
Party	Candidate	Votes	%
Republican	Danny McComas (incumbent)	22,407	100%
Total votes		22,407	100%
Republican hold			

=== Districts 20-39 ===
==== District 20 ====
Incumbent Democrat Dewey Hill has represented the 20th district and its predecessors since 1992.

North Carolina House of Representatives 20th district general election, 2010
Party	Candidate	Votes	%
Democratic	Dewey Hill (incumbent)	11,042	53.24%
Republican	Tristan V. Patterson	9,698	46.76%
Total votes		20,740	100%
Democratic hold			

==== District 21 ====
Incumbent Democrat Larry Bell has represented the 21st district since 2001.

North Carolina House of Representatives 21st district general election, 2010
Party	Candidate	Votes	%
Democratic	Larry Bell (incumbent)	11,678	65.59%
Republican	DeAnn G. Poirier	6,126	34.41%
Total votes		17,804	100%
Democratic hold			

==== District 22 ====
Incumbent Democrat William Brisson has represented the 22nd district since 2007.

North Carolina House of Representatives 22nd district general election, 2010
Party	Candidate	Votes	%
Democratic	William Brisson (incumbent)	12,675	52.87%
Republican	John Szoka	11,298	47.13%
Total votes		23,973	100%
Democratic hold			

==== District 23 ====
Incumbent Democrat Joe Tolson has represented the 23rd district and its predecessors since 1997.

North Carolina House of Representatives 23rd district general election, 2010
Party	Candidate	Votes	%
Democratic	Joe Tolson (incumbent)	12,043	53.38%
Republican	Gerald Shepheard	10,517	46.62%
Total votes		22,560	100%
Democratic hold			

==== District 24 ====
Incumbent Democrat Jean Farmer-Butterfield has represented the 24th district since 2003.

North Carolina House of Representatives 24th district general election, 2010
Party	Candidate	Votes	%
Democratic	Jean Farmer-Butterfield (incumbent)	12,682	64.84%
Republican	Claiborne R. Holtzman	6,878	35.16%
Total votes		19,560	100%
Democratic hold			

==== District 25 ====
Incumbent Democrat Randy Stewart has represented the 25th district since 2009. Stewart was defeated for re-election by Republican Jeff Collins.

North Carolina House of Representatives 25th district general election, 2010
Party	Candidate	Votes	%
Republican	Jeff Collins	14,096	57.61%
Democratic	Randy Stewart (incumbent)	10,370	42.39%
Total votes		24,466	100%
Republican gain from Democratic			

==== District 26 ====
Incumbent Republican Leo Daughtry has represented the 26th district and its predecessors since 1993.

North Carolina House of Representatives 26th district general election, 2010
Party	Candidate	Votes	%
Republican	Leo Daughtry (incumbent)	18,941	100%
Total votes		18,941	100%
Republican hold			

==== District 27 ====
Incumbent Democrat Michael Wray has represented the 27th district since 2005.

North Carolina House of Representatives 27th district general election, 2010
Party	Candidate	Votes	%
Democratic	Michael Wray (incumbent)	17,701	100%
Total votes		17,701	100%
Democratic hold			

==== District 28 ====
Incumbent Republican James Langdon Jr. has represented the 28th district since 2005.

North Carolina House of Representatives 28th district general election, 2010
Party	Candidate	Votes	%
Republican	James Langdon Jr. (incumbent)	19,918	76.72%
Democratic	Brian Allen	6,043	23.28%
Total votes		25,961	100%
Republican hold			

==== District 29 ====
Incumbent Democrat Larry Hall has represented the 29th district since 2006.

North Carolina House of Representatives 29th district general election, 2010
Party	Candidate	Votes	%
Democratic	Larry Hall (incumbent)	18,130	100%
Total votes		18,130	100%
Democratic hold			

==== District 30 ====
Incumbent Democrat Paul Luebke has represented the 30th district and its predecessors since 1991.

North Carolina House of Representatives 30th district general election, 2010
Party	Candidate	Votes	%
Democratic	Paul Luebke (incumbent)	13,442	64.52%
Republican	Jason Chambers	7,393	35.48%
Total votes		20,835	100%
Democratic hold			

==== District 31 ====
Incumbent Democrat Mickey Michaux has represented the 31st district and its predecessors since 1983.

North Carolina House of Representatives 31st district general election, 2010
Party	Candidate	Votes	%
Democratic	Mickey Michaux (incumbent)	18,801	75.50%
Republican	Patricia Ladd	6,102	24.50%
Total votes		24,903	100%
Democratic hold			

==== District 32 ====
Incumbent Democrat Jim Crawford has represented the 32nd district and its predecessors since 1995.

North Carolina House of Representatives 32nd district general election, 2010
Party	Candidate	Votes	%
Democratic	Jim Crawford (incumbent)	13,814	78.42%
Libertarian	Barbara Howe	3,802	21.58%
Total votes		17,616	100%
Democratic hold			

==== District 33 ====
Incumbent Democrat Rosa Gill has represented the 33rd district since 2009.

North Carolina House of Representatives 33rd district general election, 2010
Party	Candidate	Votes	%
Democratic	Rosa Gill (incumbent)	18,426	77.79%
Republican	Paul Terrell	5,262	22.21%
Total votes		23,688	100%
Democratic hold			

==== District 34 ====
Incumbent Democrat Grier Martin has represented the 34th district since 2005.

North Carolina House of Representatives 34th district general election, 2010
Party	Candidate	Votes	%
Democratic	Grier Martin (incumbent)	15,234	54.17%
Republican	Steve Henion	12,886	45.83%
Total votes		28,120	100%
Democratic hold			

==== District 35 ====
Incumbent Democrat Jennifer Weiss has represented the 35th district and its predecessors since 1999.

North Carolina House of Representatives 35th district general election, 2010
Party	Candidate	Votes	%
Democratic	Jennifer Weiss (incumbent)	13,144	57.48%
Republican	Don Frantz	9,725	42.52%
Total votes		22,869	100%
Democratic hold			

==== District 36 ====
Incumbent Republican Nelson Dollar has represented the 36th district since 2005.

North Carolina House of Representatives 36th district general election, 2010
Party	Candidate	Votes	%
Republican	Nelson Dollar (incumbent)	17,477	58.84%
Democratic	Robin Anderson	12,225	41.16%
Total votes		29,702	100%
Republican hold			

==== District 37 ====
Incumbent Republican Minority Leader Paul Stam has represented the 37th district since 2003.

North Carolina House of Representatives 37th district general election, 2010
Party	Candidate	Votes	%
Republican	Paul Stam (incumbent)	24,937	64.00%
Democratic	Debra McHenry	14,028	36.00%
Total votes		38,965	100%
Republican hold			

==== District 38 ====
Incumbent Democrat Deborah Ross has represented the 38th district since 2003.

North Carolina House of Representatives 38th district general election, 2010
Party	Candidate	Votes	%
Democratic	Deborah Ross (incumbent)	14,093	65.63%
Republican	Madison E. Shook	7,382	34.37%
Total votes		21,475	100%
Democratic hold			

==== District 39 ====
Incumbent Democrat Darren Jackson has represented the 39th district since his appointment in January 2009. Jackson was elected to his first full term.

North Carolina House of Representatives 39th district general election, 2010
Party	Candidate	Votes	%
Democratic	Darren Jackson (incumbent)	16,870	56.84%
Republican	Duane Cutlip	12,809	43.16%
Total votes		29,679	100%
Democratic hold			

=== Districts 40-59 ===
==== District 40 ====
Incumbent Republican Marilyn Avila has represented the 40th district since 2007.

North Carolina House of Representatives 40th district general election, 2010
Party	Candidate	Votes	%
Republican	Marilyn Avila (incumbent)	27,686	62.88%
Democratic	Violet Rhinehart	16,345	37.12%
Total votes		44,031	100%
Republican hold			

==== District 41 ====
Incumbent Republican Chris Heagarty has represented the 41st district since his appointment in October 2009. Heagarty sought election to a full term, but he was defeated by Republican Tom Murry.

North Carolina House of Representatives 41st district general election, 2010
Party	Candidate	Votes	%
Republican	Tom Murry	19,736	53.65%
Democratic	Chris Heagarty (incumbent)	17,052	46.35%
Total votes		36,788	100%
Republican gain from Democratic			

==== District 42 ====
Incumbent Democrat Marvin Lucas has represented the 42nd district and its predecessors since 2001.

North Carolina House of Representatives 42nd district general election, 2010
Party	Candidate	Votes	%
Democratic	Marvin Lucas (incumbent)	8,874	100%
Total votes		8,874	100%
Democratic hold			

==== District 43 ====
Incumbent Democrat Elmer Floyd has represented the 43rd district since 2009.

North Carolina House of Representatives 43rd district general election, 2010
Party	Candidate	Votes	%
Democratic	Elmer Floyd (incumbent)	7,967	100%
Total votes		7,967	100%
Democratic hold			

==== District 44 ====
Incumbent Democrat Diane Parfitt has represented the 44th district since her appointment in 2010. Parfitt was elected to a full term.

North Carolina House of Representatives 44th district general election, 2010
Party	Candidate	Votes	%
Democratic	Diane Parfitt (incumbent)	8,189	50.33%
Republican	Johnny Dawkins	8,081	49.67%
Total votes		16,270	100%
Democratic hold			

==== District 45 ====
Incumbent Democrat Rick Glazier has represented the 45th district since 2003.

North Carolina House of Representatives 45th district general election, 2010
Party	Candidate	Votes	%
Democratic	Rick Glazier (incumbent)	9,858	50.12%
Republican	Jackie Warner	9,812	49.88%
Total votes		19,670	100%
Democratic hold			

==== District 46 ====
Incumbent Democrat Douglas Yongue has represented the 46th district and its predecessors since 1994. He lost re-election to Republican Gaston (G.L.) Pridgen.

North Carolina House of Representatives 46th district general election, 2010
Party	Candidate	Votes	%
Republican	Gaston (G.L.) Pridgen	7,590	52.17%
Democratic	Douglas Yongue (incumbent)	6,958	47.83%
Total votes		14,548	100%
Republican gain from Democratic			

==== District 47 ====
Incumbent Democrat Ronnie Sutton has represented the 47th district since 1995. Sutton lost re-nomination to fellow Democrat Charles Graham, who went on to win the general election.

North Carolina House of Representatives 47th district general election, 2010
Party	Candidate	Votes	%
Democratic	Charles Graham	7,865	66.83%
Republican	Brawleigh Jason Graham	3,903	33.17%
Total votes		11,768	100%
Democratic hold			

==== District 48 ====
Incumbent Democrat Garland Pierce has represented the 48th district since 2005.

North Carolina House of Representatives 48th district general election, 2010
Party	Candidate	Votes	%
Democratic	Garland Pierce (incumbent)	9,698	74.80%
Republican	John F. Harry	3,267	25.20%
Total votes		12,965	100%
Democratic hold			

==== District 49 ====
Incumbent Democrat John May has represented the 49th district since his appointment in April 2010. May sought election to a full term, but he was defeated by Republican Glen Bradley.

North Carolina House of Representatives 49th district general election, 2010
Party	Candidate	Votes	%
Republican	Glen Bradley	11,276	51.68%
Democratic	John May (incumbent)	10,544	48.32%
Total votes		21,820	100%
Republican gain from Democratic			

==== District 50 ====
Incumbent Democrat Bill Faison has represented the 50th district since 2005.

North Carolina House of Represesntatives 50th district general election, 2010
Party	Candidate	Votes	%
Democratic	Bill Faison (incumbent)	13,848	56.17%
Republican	Rick Smith	10,804	43.83%
Total votes		24,652	100%
Democratic hold			

==== District 51 ====
Incumbent Democrat Jimmy Love Sr. has represented the 51st district since 2006. Love was defeated for re-election by Republican Mike Stone.

North Carolina House of Representatives 51st district general election, 2010
Party	Candidate	Votes	%
Republican	Mike Stone	10,793	53.53%
Democratic	Jimmy Love Sr. (incumbent)	9,370	46.47%
Total votes		20,163	100%
Republican gain from Democratic			

==== District 52 ====
Incumbent Republican Jamie Boles has represented the 52nd district since 2009.

North Carolina House of Representatives 52nd district general election, 2010
Party	Candidate	Votes	%
Republican	Jamie Boles (incumbent)	20,749	100%
Total votes		20,749	100%
Republican hold			

==== District 53 ====
Incumbent Republican David Lewis has represented the 53rd district since 2003.

North Carolina House of Representatives 53rd district general election, 2010
Party	Candidate	Votes	%
Republican	David Lewis (incumbent)	13,533	66.61%
Democratic	Abraham Oudeh	6,784	33.39%
Total votes		20,317	100%
Republican hold			

==== District 54 ====
Incumbent Democrat and Speaker of the House Joe Hackney has represented the 54th district and its predecessors since 1981.

North Carolina House of Representatives 54th district general election, 2010
Party	Candidate	Votes	%
Democratic	Joe Hackney (incumbent)	18,048	57.45%
Republican	Cathy Wright	13,368	42.55%
Total votes		31,416	100%
Democratic hold			

==== District 55 ====
Incumbent Democrat Winkie Wilkins has represented the 55th district since 2005.

North Carolina House of Representatives 55th district general election, 2010
Party	Candidate	Votes	%
Democratic	Winkie Wilkins (incumbent)	16,619	100%
Total votes		16,619	100%
Democratic hold			

==== District 56 ====
Incumbent Democrat Verla Insko has represented the 56th district and its predecessors since 1997.

North Carolina House of Representatives 56th district general election, 2010
Party	Candidate	Votes	%
Democratic	Verla Insko (incumbent)	17,737	100%
Total votes		17,737	100%
Democratic hold			

==== District 57 ====
Incumbent Democrat Pricey Harrison has represented the 57th district since 2005.

North Carolina House of Representatives 57th district general election, 2010
Party	Candidate	Votes	%
Democratic	Pricey Harrison (incumbent)	10,664	55.69%
Republican	Jon Hardister	8,485	44.31%
Total votes		19,149	100%
Democratic hold			

==== District 58 ====
Incumbent Democrat Alma Adams has represented the 58th district and its predecessors since 1994.

North Carolina House of Representatives 58th district general election, 2010
Party	Candidate	Votes	%
Democratic	Alma Adams (incumbent)	15,334	63.15%
Republican	Darin H. Thomas	8,948	36.85%
Total votes		24,282	100%
Democratic hold			

==== District 59 ====
Incumbent Democrat Maggie Jeffus has represented the 59th district since 1991.

North Carolina House of Representatives 58th district general election, 2010
Party	Candidate	Votes	%
Democratic	Maggie Jeffus (incumbent)	11,928	52.65%
Republican	Thersea Yon	10,729	47.35%
Total votes		22,657	100%
Democratic hold			

=== Districts 60-79 ===
==== District 60 ====
Incumbent Democrat Earl Jones has represented the 60th district since 2003. Jones lost re-nomination to fellow Democrat Marcus Brandon, who went on to win the general election.

North Carolina House of Representatives 58th district general election, 2010
Party	Candidate	Votes	%
Democratic	Marcus Brandon	10,664	69.65%
Republican	Lonnie R. Wilson	4,646	30.35%
Total votes		15,310	100%
Democratic hold			

==== District 61 ====
Incumbent Republican Laura Wiley has represented the 61st District since 2005. Wiley didn't seek re-election and Republican John Faircloth won the open seat.

North Carolina House of Representatives 61st district general election, 2010
Party	Candidate	Votes	%
Republican	John Faircloth	18,035	100%
Total votes		18,035	100%
Republican hold			

==== District 62 ====
Incumbent Republican John Blust has represented the 62nd District and its predecessors since 2001.

North Carolina House of Representatives 62nd district general election, 2010
Party	Candidate	Votes	%
Republican	John Blust (incumbent)	21,829	83.65%
Libertarian	Jeffery Simon	4,266	16.35%
Total votes		26,095	100%
Republican hold			

==== District 63 ====
Incumbent Democrat Alice Bordsen has represented the 63rd District since 2003.

North Carolina House of Representatives 63rd district general election, 2010
Party	Candidate	Votes	%
Democratic	Alice Bordsen (incumbent)	8,920	54.21%
Republican	Roger Kirk Parker	7,536	45.79%
Total votes		16,456	100%
Democratic hold			

==== District 64 ====
Incumbent Republican Dan Ingle has represented the 64th District since 2009.

North Carolina House of Representatives 64th district general election, 2010
Party	Candidate	Votes	%
Republican	Dan Ingle (incumbent)	19,301	100%
Total votes		19,301	100%
Republican hold			

==== District 65 ====
Incumbent Democrat Nelson Cole has represented the 65th District since 1993. Cole was defeated for re-election by conservative independent (Note: listed on the ballot as "Unaffiliated") Bert Jones. Jones chose to caucus with the Republican Party.

North Carolina House of Representatives 65th district general election, 2010
Party	Candidate	Votes	%
Independent	Bert Jones	9,628	56.01%
Democratic	Nelson Cole (incumbent)	7,561	43.99%
Total votes		17,189	100%
Independent gain from Democratic			

==== District 66 ====
Incumbent Democrat Melanie Wade Goodwin has represented the 66th District since 2005. Goodwin didn't seek re-election and Democrat Ken Goodman won the open seat.

North Carolina House of Representatives 66th district general election, 2010
Party	Candidate	Votes	%
Democratic	Ken Goodman	11,298	60.68%
Republican	James Haywood Parsons	7,322	39.32%
Total votes		18,620	100%
Democratic hold			

==== District 67 ====
Incumbent Republican Justin Burr has represented the 67th District since 2009.

North Carolina House of Representatives 67th district general election, 2010
Party	Candidate	Votes	%
Republican	Justin Burr (incumbent)	17,135	75.41%
Democratic	Kevin Furr	5,587	24.59%
Total votes		22,722	100%
Republican hold			

==== District 68 ====
Incumbent Republican Curtis Blackwood has represented the 68th District since 2003. Blackwood didn't seek re-election and Republican Craig Horn won the open seat.

North Carolina House of Representatives 68th district general election, 2010
Party	Candidate	Votes	%
Republican	Craig Horn	28,214	100%
Total votes		28,214	100%
Republican hold			

==== District 69 ====
Incumbent Democrat Pryor Gibson has represented the 69th district and its predecessors since 1999.

North Carolina House of Representatives 69th district general election, 2010
Party	Candidate	Votes	%
Democratic	Pryor Gibson (incumbent)	10,302	60.20%
Republican	John L. Barker	6,810	39.80%
Total votes		17,112	100%
Democratic hold			

==== District 70 ====
Incumbent Republican Pat Hurley has represented the 70th District since 2007.

North Carolina House of Representatives 70th district general election, 2010
Party	Candidate	Votes	%
Republican	Pat Hurley (incumbent)	13,564	100%
Total votes		13,564	100%
Republican hold			

==== District 71 ====
Incumbent Democrat Larry Womble has represented the 71st District and its predecessors since 1995.

North Carolina House of Representatives 71st district general election, 2010
Party	Candidate	Votes	%
Democratic	Larry Womble (incumbent)	9,503	100%
Total votes		9,503	100%
Democratic hold			

==== District 72 ====
Incumbent Democrat Earline Parmon has represented the 72nd District since 2003.

North Carolina House of Representatives 72nd district general election, 2010
Party	Candidate	Votes	%
Democratic	Earline Parmon (incumbent)	9,980	69.48%
Republican	John Magee	4,384	30.52%
Total votes		14,364	100%
Democratic hold			

==== District 73 ====
Incumbent Republican Larry Brown has represented the 73rd district since 2005.

North Carolina House of Representatives 73rd district general election, 2010
Party	Candidate	Votes	%
Republican	Larry Brown (incumbent)	17,675	100%
Total votes		17,675	100%
Republican hold			

==== District 74 ====
Incumbent Republican Dale Folwell has represented the 74th District since 2005.

North Carolina House of Representatives 74th district general election, 2010
Party	Candidate	Votes	%
Republican	Dale Folwell (incumbent)	17,475	69.32%
Democratic	Cristina V. Vazquez	7,733	30.68%
Total votes		25,208	100%
Republican hold			

==== District 75 ====
Incumbent Republican William McGee has represented the 75th District and its predecessors since 1990.

North Carolina House of Representatives 75th district general election, 2010
Party	Candidate	Votes	%
Republican	William McGee (incumbent)	17,824	100%
Total votes		17,824	100%
Republican hold			

==== District 76 ====
Incumbent Republican Fred Steen II has represented the 76th District since 2004.

North Carolina House of Representatives 76th district general election, 2010
Party	Candidate	Votes	%
Republican	Fred Steen II (incumbent)	15,093	100%
Total votes		15,093	100%
Republican hold			

==== District 77 ====
Incumbent Democrat Lorene Coates has represented the 77th District and its predecessors since 2001. Coates was defeated for re-election by Republican Harry Warren.

North Carolina House of Representatives 77th district general election, 2010
Party	Candidate	Votes	%
Republican	Harry Warren	9,117	50.46%
Democratic	Lorene Coates (incumbent)	8,951	49.54%
Total votes		18,068	100%
Republican gain from Democratic			

==== District 78 ====
Incumbent Republican Harold Brubaker has represented the 78th District and its predecessors since 1977.

North Carolina House of Representatives 78th district general election, 2010
Party	Candidate	Votes	%
Republican	Harold Brubaker (incumbent)	13,823	100%
Total votes		13,823	100%
Republican hold			

==== District 79 ====
Incumbent Republican Julia Craven Howard has represented the 79th District and its predecessors since 1989.

North Carolina House of Representatives 79th district general election, 2010
Party	Candidate	Votes	%
Republican	Julia Craven Howard (incumbent)	17,006	100%
Total votes		17,006	100%
Republican hold			

=== Districts 80-99 ===
==== District 80 ====
Incumbent Republican Jerry Dockham has represented the 80th district and its predecessors since 1991.

North Carolina House of Representatives 80th district general election, 2010
Party	Candidate	Votes	%
Republican	Jerry Dockham (incumbent)	16,593	100%
Total votes		16,593	100%
Republican hold			

==== District 81 ====
Incumbent Democrat Hugh Holliman has represented the 81st District since 2001. He was defeated for re-election by Republican Rayne Brown.

North Carolina House of Representatives 81st district general election, 2010
Party	Candidate	Votes	%
Republican	Rayne Brown	8,744	57.48%
Democratic	Hugh Holliman (incumbent)	6,469	42.52%
Total votes		15,213	100%
Republican gain from Democratic			

==== District 82 ====
Incumbent Republican Jeff Barnhart has represented the 82nd District since 2001.

North Carolina House of Representatives 82nd district general election, 2010
Party	Candidate	Votes	%
Republican	Jeff Barnhart (incumbent)	17,694	100%
Total votes		17,694	100%
Republican hold			

==== District 83 ====
Incumbent Republican Linda Johnson has represented the 83rd District and its predecessors since 2001.

North Carolina House of Representatives 83rd district general election, 2010
Party	Candidate	Votes	%
Republican	Linda Johnson (incumbent)	17,197	100%
Total votes		17,197	100%
Republican hold			

==== District 84 ====
Incumbent Republican Phillip Frye has represented the 84th district since 2003.

North Carolina House of Representatives 84th district general election, 2010
Party	Candidate	Votes	%
Republican	Phillip Frye (incumbent)	15,393	100%
Total votes		15,393	100%
Republican hold			

==== District 85 ====
Incumbent Republican Mitch Gillespie has represented the 85th District since 1999.

North Carolina House of Representatives 85th district general election, 2010
Party	Candidate	Votes	%
Republican	Mitch Gillespie (incumbent)	12,421	69.01%
Democratic	Beth Ostgaard	5,577	30.99%
Total votes		17,998	100%
Republican hold			

==== District 86 ====
Incumbent Republican Hugh Blackwell has represented the 86th District since 2009.

North Carolina House of Representatives 86th district general election, 2010
Party	Candidate	Votes	%
Republican	Hugh Blackwell (incumbent)	10,429	61.93%
Democratic	Walter Church Jr.	6,412	38.07%
Total votes		16,841	100%
Republican hold			

==== District 87 ====
Incumbent Republican Edgar Starnes has represented the 87th District and its predecessors since 1997.

North Carolina House of Representatives 87th district general election, 2010
Party	Candidate	Votes	%
Republican	Edgar Starnes (incumbent)	14,295	100%
Total votes		14,295	100%
Republican hold			

==== District 88 ====
Incumbent Democrat Ray Warren has represented the 88th district since 2007. Warren didn't seek re-election and former Republican representative Mark Hollo won the open seat.

North Carolina House of Representatives 88th district general election, 2010
Party	Candidate	Votes	%
Republican	Mark Hollo	13,587	64.36%
Democratic	David Munday	7,525	35.64%
Total votes		21,112	100%
Republican gain from Democratic			

==== District 89 ====
Incumbent Republican Mitchell Setzer has represented the 89th District and its predecessors since 1999.

North Carolina House of Representatives 89th district general election, 2010
Party	Candidate	Votes	%
Republican	Mitchell Setzer (incumbent)	16,119	100%
Total votes		16,119	100%
Republican hold			

==== District 90 ====
Incumbent Republican Sarah Stevens has represented the 90th District since 2009.

North Carolina House of Representatives 90th district general election, 2010
Party	Candidate	Votes	%
Republican	Sarah Stevens (incumbent)	12,274	71.10%
Democratic	Randy Wolfe	4,988	28.90%
Total votes		17,262	100%
Republican hold			

==== District 91 ====
Incumbent Republican Bryan Holloway has represented the 91st District since 2005.

North Carolina House of Representatives 91st district general election, 2010
Party	Candidate	Votes	%
Republican	Bryan Holloway (incumbent)	16,153	75.38%
Democratic	Ed Gambill	5,275	24.62%
Total votes		21,428	100%
Republican hold			

==== District 92 ====
Incumbent Republican Darrell McCormick has represented the 92nd district since 2009.

North Carolina House of Representatives 92nd district general election, 2010
Party	Candidate	Votes	%
Republican	Darrell McCormick (incumbent)	15,883	100%
Total votes		15,883	100%
Republican hold			

==== District 93 ====
Incumbent Democrat Cullie Tarleton has represented the 93rd district since 2007. He was defeated for re-election by Republican Jonathan Jordan.

North Carolina House of Representatives 93rd district general election, 2010
Party	Candidate	Votes	%
Republican	Jonathan Jordan	13,528	51.46%
Democratic	Cullie Tarleton (incumbent)	12,759	48.54%
Total votes		26,287	100%
Republican gain from Democratic			

==== District 94 ====
Incumbent Republican Shirley Randleman has represented the 94th District since 2009.

North Carolina House of Representatives 94th district general election, 2010
Party	Candidate	Votes	%
Republican	Shirley Randleman (incumbent)	14,322	73.65%
Democratic	David H. Moulton	5,124	26.35%
Total votes		19,446	100%
Republican hold			

==== District 95 ====
Incumbent Republican Grey Mills has represented the 95th District since 2009.

North Carolina House of Representatives 95th district general election, 2010
Party	Candidate	Votes	%
Republican	Grey Mills (incumbent)	18,675	100%
Total votes		18,675	100%
Republican hold			

==== District 96 ====
Incumbent Republican Mark Hilton has represented the 96th District and its predecessors since 2001.

North Carolina House of Representatives 96th district general election, 2010
Party	Candidate	Votes	%
Republican	Mark Hilton (incumbent)	12,193	66.70%
Democratic	Gary Lafone	6,087	33.30%
Total votes		18,280	100%
Republican hold			

==== District 97 ====
Incumbent Republican Jonathan Rhyne Jr. has represented the 97th District since 2009.

North Carolina House of Representatives 97th district general election, 2010
Party	Candidate	Votes	%
Republican	Jonathan Rhyne Jr. (incumbent)	18,274	100%
Total votes		18,274	100%
Republican hold			

==== District 98 ====
Incumbent Republican Thom Tillis has represented the 98th District since 2007.

North Carolina House of Representatives 98th district general election, 2010
Party	Candidate	Votes	%
Republican	Thom Tillis (incumbent)	23,540	100%
Total votes		23,540	100%
Republican hold			

==== District 99 ====
Incumbent Democrat Nick Mackey has represented the 99th District since 2009. Mackey lost re-nomination to fellow Democrat Rodney Moore. Moore Won the general election.

North Carolina House of Representatives 99th district general election, 2010
Party	Candidate	Votes	%
Democratic	Rodney Moore	15,591	72.01%
Republican	Michael T. Wilson	6,059	27.99%
Total votes		21,650	100%
Democratic hold			

=== Districts 100-120 ===
==== District 100 ====
Incumbent Democrat Tricia Cotham has represented the 100th District since 2007.

North Carolina House of Representatives 100th district general election, 2010
Party	Candidate	Votes	%
Democratic	Tricia Cotham (incumbent)	9,578	100%
Total votes		9,578	100%
Democratic hold			

==== District 101 ====
Incumbent Democrat Beverly Earle has represented the 101st District and its predecessors since 1995.

North Carolina House of Representatives 101st district general election, 2010
Party	Candidate	Votes	%
Democratic	Beverly Earle (incumbent)	15,184	74.30%
Republican	Rebecca H. Steen	5,253	25.70%
Total votes		20,437	100%
Democratic hold			

==== District 102 ====
Incumbent Democrat Becky Carney has represented the 102nd District since 2003.

North Carolina House of Representatives 102nd district general election, 2010
Party	Candidate	Votes	%
Democratic	Becky Carney (incumbent)	10,993	100%
Total votes		10,993	100%
Democratic hold			

==== District 103 ====
Incumbent Republican Jim Gulley has represented the 103rd District and its predecessors since 1997. Gulley didn't seek re-election and Republican Bill Brawley won the open seat.

North Carolina House of Representatives 103rd district general election, 2010
Party	Candidate	Votes	%
Republican	Bill Brawley	13,790	56.01%
Democratic	Ann Newman	10,830	43.99%
Total votes		24,620	100%
Republican hold			

==== District 104 ====
Incumbent Republican Ruth Samuelson has represented the 104th District since 2007.

North Carolina House of Representatives 104th district general election, 2010
Party	Candidate	Votes	%
Republican	Ruth Samuelson (incumbent)	20,001	74.74%
Democratic	Frank Deaton	6,758	25.26%
Total votes		26,759	100%
Republican hold			

==== District 105 ====
Incumbent Republican Ric Killian has represented the 105th District since 2007.

North Carolina House of Representatives 105th district general election, 2010
Party	Candidate	Votes	%
Republican	Ric Killian (incumbent)	22,857	100%
Total votes		22,857	100%
Republican hold			

==== District 106 ====
Incumbent Democrat Martha Alexander has represented the 106th district and its predecessors since 1999.

North Carolina House of Representatives 106th district general election, 2010
Party	Candidate	Votes	%
Democratic	Martha Alexander (incumbent)	10,278	59.50%
Republican	Michael Cavallo	6,996	40.50%
Total votes		17,274	100%
Democratic hold			

==== District 107 ====
Incumbent Democrat Kelly Alexander has represented the 107th District since 2009.

North Carolina House of Representatives 107th district general election, 2010
Party	Candidate	Votes	%
Democratic	Kelly Alexander (incumbent)	13,132	67.26%
Republican	Debbie Ware	6,392	32.74%
Total votes		19,524	100%
Democratic hold			

==== District 108 ====
Incumbent Republican Wil Neumann has represented the 108th District since 2007. Neumann didn't seek re-election and Republican John Torbett won the open seat.

North Carolina House of Representatives 108th district general election, 2010
Party	Candidate	Votes	%
Republican	John Torbett	15,034	100%
Total votes		15,034	100%
Republican hold			

==== District 109 ====
Incumbent Republican William Current has represented the 109th District since 2005.

North Carolina House of Representatives 109th district general election, 2010
Party	Candidate	Votes	%
Republican	William Current (incumbent)	12,183	
Total votes		12,183	100%
Republican hold			

==== District 110 ====
Incumbent Republican Pearl Burris-Floyd has represented the 110th District since 2009. Burris-Floyd lost re-nomination to fellow Republican Kelly Hastings. Hastings won the general election.

North Carolina House of Representatives 110th district general election, 2010
Party	Candidate	Votes	%
Republican	Kelly Hastings	12,433	69.82%
Democratic	John Eaker	5,373	30.18%
Total votes		17,806	100%
Republican hold			

==== District 111 ====
Incumbent Republican Tim Moore has represented the 111th District since 2003.

North Carolina House of Representatives 111th district general election, 2010
Party	Candidate	Votes	%
Republican	Tim Moore (incumbent)	11,972	65.12%
Democratic	Mary S. Accor	6,413	34.88%
Total votes		18,385	100%
Republican hold			

==== District 112 ====
Incumbent Democrat Bob England has represented the 112th District since 2003. England didn't seek re-election and Republican Mike Hager won the open seat.

North Carolina House of Representatives 112th district general election, 2010
Party	Candidate	Votes	%
Republican	Mike Hager	13,486	65.18%
Democratic	Jim Proctor	7,203	34.82%
Total votes		20,689	100%
Republican gain from Democratic			

==== District 113 ====
Incumbent Republican David Guice has represented the 113th District since 2009.

North Carolina House of Representatives 113th district general election, 2010
Party	Candidate	Votes	%
Republican	David Guice (incumbent)	19,641	100%
Total votes		19,641	100%
Republican hold			

==== District 114 ====
Incumbent Democrat Susan Fisher has represented the 114th District since 2004.

North Carolina House of Representatives 114th district general election, 2010
Party	Candidate	Votes	%
Democratic	Susan Fisher (incumbent)	14,555	58.43%
Republican	John Carroll	10,356	41.57%
Total votes		24,911	100%
Democratic hold			

==== District 115 ====
Incumbent Democrat Patsy Keever has represented the 115th District since 2010.

North Carolina House of Representatives 115th district general election, 2010
Party	Candidate	Votes	%
Democratic	Patsy Keever (incumbent)	15,775	56.22%
Republican	Mark Crawford	12,282	43.78%
Total votes		28,057	100%
Democratic hold			

==== District 116 ====
Incumbent Democrat Jane Whilden has represented the 116th district since 2009. Whilden was defeated for re-election by Republican Tim Moffitt.

North Carolina House of Representatives 116th district general election, 2010
Party	Candidate	Votes	%
Republican	Tim Moffitt	14,638	55.79%
Democratic	Jane Whilden (incumbent)	11,598	44.21%
Total votes		26,236	100%
Republican gain from Democratic			

==== District 117 ====
Incumbent Republican Carolyn Justus has represented the 117th District since October 2002. Justus didn't seek re-election and Republican Chuck McGrady won the open seat.

North Carolina House of Representatives 117th district general election, 2010
Party	Candidate	Votes	%
Republican	Chuck McGrady	20,331`	100%
Total votes		20,331	100%
Republican hold			

==== District 118 ====
Incumbent Democrat Ray Rapp has represented the 118th District since 2003.

North Carolina House of Representatives 118th district general election, 2010
Party	Candidate	Votes	%
Democratic	Ray Rapp (incumbent)	13,267	54.66%
Republican	Samuel L. (Sam) Edwards	11,006	45.34%
Total votes		24,273	100%
Democratic hold			

==== District 119 ====
Incumbent Democrat Phil Haire has represented the 119th District and its predecessors since 1999.

North Carolina House of Representatives 119th district general election, 2010
Party	Candidate	Votes	%
Democratic	Phil Haire (incumbent)	12,637	55.95%
Republican	Dodie Allen	9,951	44.05%
Total votes		22,588	100%
Democratic hold			

==== District 120 ====
Incumbent Republican Roger West has represented the 120th District and its predecessors since 2000.

North Carolina House of Representatives 120th district general election, 2010
Party	Candidate	Votes	%
Republican	Roger West (incumbent)	20,086	72.11%
Democratic	Randy Hogsed	7,767	27.89%
Total votes		27,853	100%
Republican hold			

== See also ==
- List of North Carolina state legislatures
