= Drew P. Saunders =

American politician from North Carolina

Drew Saunders
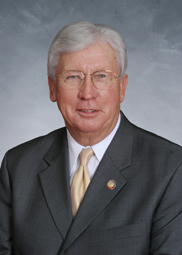

Member of the North Carolina House of Representatives
- In office January 1, 1997 – January 1, 2009
- Preceded by: John Bell McLaughlin
- Succeeded by: Nick Mackey
- Constituency: 54th District (1997-2003); 99th District (2003-2009)

Personal details
- Born: Drew Paschal Saunders; June 9, 1938 (age 88) Lilesville, North Carolina, U.S.
- Party: Democratic
- Education: University of North Carolina at Charlotte, Wake Forest University, Babcock Business School
- Profession: Human resources manager

Drew Paschal Saunders (born June 9, 1938) is a former Democratic member of the North Carolina General Assembly where he represented the state's ninety-ninth House district, including constituents in Mecklenburg county. Saunders was defeated in the 2008 Democratic primary by Nick Mackey with Mackey receiving 53% of the vote to 47% for Saunders. Saunders is a human resources manager from Huntersville, North Carolina and served six terms in the state House.

Stated during a discussion on North Carolina ethics laws "Even the baby Jesus accepted gifts, and I don't think it corrupted him.

== Electoral history ==
=== 2008 ===
North Carolina House of Representatives 99th district Democratic primary election, 2008
Party	Candidate	Votes	%
Democratic	Nick Mackey	9,176	53.08%
Democratic	Drew Saunders (incumbent)	8,111	46.92%
Total votes		17,287	100%

=== 2006 ===
North Carolina House of Representatives 99th district general election, 2006
Party	Candidate	Votes	%
Democratic	Drew Saunders (incumbent)	9,463	100%
Total votes		9,463	100%
Democratic hold			

=== 2004 ===
North Carolina House of Representatives 99th district general election, 2004
Party	Candidate	Votes	%
Democratic	Drew Saunders (incumbent)	20,081	100%
Total votes		20,081	100%
Democratic hold			

=== 2002 ===
North Carolina House of Representatives 99th district general election, 2002
Party	Candidate	Votes	%
Democratic	Drew Saunders (incumbent)	10,636	100%
Total votes		10,636	100%
Democratic hold			

=== 2000 ===
North Carolina House of Representatives 54th district general election, 2000
Party	Candidate	Votes	%
Democratic	Drew Saunders (incumbent)	20,097	55.19%
Republican	Wes Southern	16,319	44.81%
Total votes		36,416	100%
Democratic hold			

North Carolina House of Representatives
Preceded by John Bell McLaughlin	Member of the North Carolina House of Representatives from the 54th district 1997–2003	Succeeded by Joe Hackney
Preceded by Constituency established	Member of the North Carolina House of Representatives from the 99th district 2003–2009	Succeeded by Nick Mackey
