= Rodney W. Moore =

American politician (born 1963)

Rodney Moore
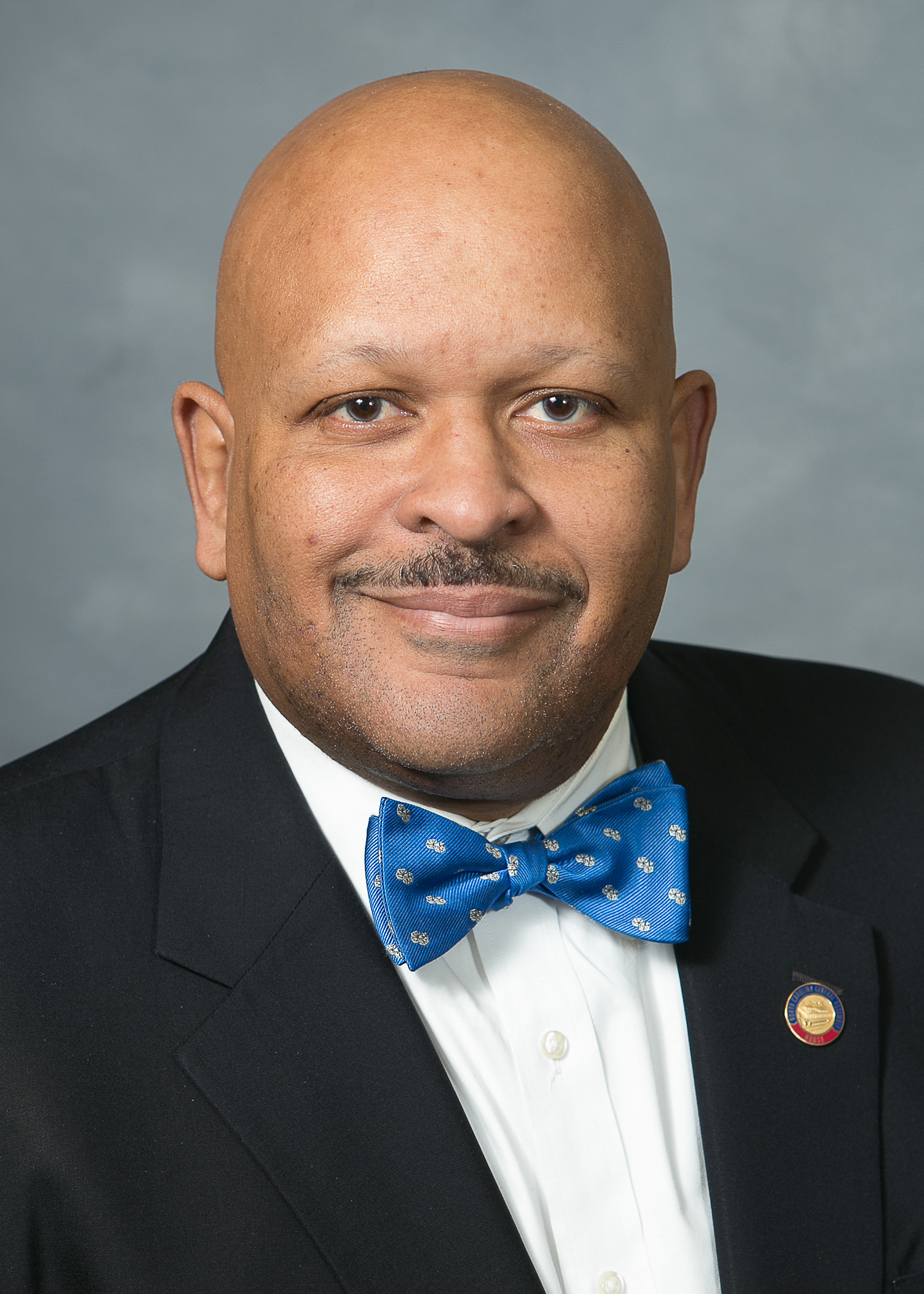

Member of the North Carolina House of Representatives from the 99th district
- In office January 1, 2011 – January 1, 2019
- Preceded by: Nick Mackey
- Succeeded by: Nasif Majeed

Personal details
- Born: July 12, 1963 (age 63)
- Party: Democratic

Rodney W. Moore (born July 12, 1963) is an American politician from the state of North Carolina. He is a member of the Democratic Party, and served in the North Carolina House of Representatives, representing the 99th district, until 2019.

Moore first ran for the state House in 2010. He defeated incumbent Democrat Nick Mackey in the primary election, and won the seat in the general election. He was a candidate in the 2014 special election for North Carolina's 12th congressional district.

In March 2019, Moore was indicted on nine felony counts involving filing false campaign reports; investigators stated that he failed to report more than $141,000 in campaign contributions and expenditures. He pleaded guilty to one felony charge of making false statements under oath and was sentenced to probation.

Moore is African-American.

== Electoral history ==
=== 2022 ===
North Carolina House of Representatives 112th district Democratic primary election, 2022
| Party | Candidate | Votes | % |
|---|---|---|---|
| Democratic | Tricia Cotham | 2,385 | 47.81% |
| Democratic | Yolanda Holmes | 1,559 | 31.25% |
| Democratic | Jay Holman | 853 | 17.10% |
| Democratic | Rodney Moore | 192 | 3.85% |
| Total votes | | 4,989 | 100% |

=== 2018 ===
North Carolina House of Representatives 99th district Democratic primary election, 2018
| Party | Candidate | Votes | % |
|---|---|---|---|
| Democratic | Nasif Majeed | 3,010 | 57.27% |
| Democratic | Priscilla "PJ" Johnson | 1,187 | 22.58% |
| Democratic | Rodney Moore (incumbent) | 879 | 16.72% |
| Democratic | Jackson Pethal | 180 | 3.42% |
| Total votes | | 5,256 | 100% |

=== 2016 ===
North Carolina House of Representatives 99th district general election, 2016
| Party | Candidate | Votes | % |
|---|---|---|---|
| Democratic | Rodney Moore (incumbent) | 28,838 | 100% |
| Total votes | | 28,838 | 100% |
| Democratic hold | | | |

=== 2014 ===
North Carolina House of Representatives 99th district general election, 2014
| Party | Candidate | Votes | % |
|---|---|---|---|
| Democratic | Rodney Moore (incumbent) | 15,189 | 100% |
| Total votes | | 15,189 | 100% |
| Democratic hold | | | |

=== 2012 ===
North Carolina House of Representatives 99th district general election, 2012
| Party | Candidate | Votes | % |
|---|---|---|---|
| Democratic | Rodney Moore (incumbent) | 28,282 | 100% |
| Total votes | | 28,282 | 100% |
| Democratic hold | | | |

=== 2010 ===
North Carolina House of Representatives 99th district Democratic primary election, 2010
| Party | Candidate | Votes | % |
|---|---|---|---|
| Democratic | Rodney Moore | 1,660 | 61.73% |
| Democratic | Nick Mackey (incumbent) | 1,029 | 38.27% |
| Total votes | | 2,689 | 100% |

North Carolina House of Representatives 99th district general election, 2010
| Party | Candidate | Votes | % |
|---|---|---|---|
| Democratic | Rodney Moore | 15,591 | 72.01% |
| Republican | Michael T. Wilson | 6,059 | 27.99% |
| Total votes | | 21,650 | 100% |
| Democratic hold | | | |

North Carolina House of Representatives
| Preceded by Nick Mackey | Member of the North Carolina House of Representatives from the 99th district 2011–2019 | Succeeded by Nasif Majeed |
