= Nick Mackey =

American lawyer & politician

Member of the North Carolina House of Representatives from the 99th district
- In office January 1, 2009 – January 1, 2011
- Preceded by: Drew Saunders
- Succeeded by: Rodney Moore

Personal details
- Party: Democratic
- Occupation: Lawyer

Nikita V. Mackey is an American former police officer, lawyer, and politician who served as a Democratic member of the North Carolina House of Representatives, representing the 99th district.

Mackey worked for 14 years as a police officer with the Charlotte-Mecklenburg Police Department before resigning in 2003 due to allegations that he had produced fraudulent time sheets. A few years later, Mackey was elected sheriff in Mecklenburg County, North Carolina, but the election results were nullified due to questionable voting practices. Daniel "Chipp" Bailey ultimately became sheriff.

In 2009, Mackey was elected to represent the 99th district of the North Carolina House of Representatives, succeeding Drew Saunders. In 2010, the North Carolina State Bar revoked Mackey's law license for up to three years because he did not disclose on his 2002 license application his failure to pay income taxes, and further failed to disclose his alleged misconduct when employed by the Charlotte-Mecklenburg Police Department. The day after his law license was suspended, Mackey lost his bid for re-election; he was defeated in the primary election by Rodney Moore, who later won the 99th district seat. Mackey's law license was reinstated in June 2011.

In 2016, one of Mackey's law clients was released from prison after serving 10 years of a 30-year sentence for conspiracy and racketeering. The court found that Mackey had been sleeping during the man's trial. Mackey was disbarred in February 2022 after pleading guilty in 2020 to multiple charges stemming from two incidents in which he fired gunshots into buildings owned by his wife or her relatives.

== Electoral history ==
=== 2010 ===
North Carolina House of Representatives 99th district Democratic primary election, 2010
Party	Candidate	Votes	%
Democratic	Rodney Moore	1,660	61.73%
Democratic	Nick Mackey (incumbent)	1,029	38.27%
Total votes		2,689	100%

=== 2008 ===
North Carolina House of Representatives 99th district Democratic primary election, 2008
Party	Candidate	Votes	%
Democratic	Nick Mackey	9,176	53.08%
Democratic	Drew Saunders (incumbent)	8,111	46.92%
Total votes		17,287	100%

North Carolina House of Representatives 99th district general election, 2008
Party	Candidate	Votes	%
Democratic	Nick Mackey	28,106	65.32%
Republican	Dempsey Miller	14,925	34.68%
Total votes		43,031	100%
Democratic hold			

North Carolina House of Representatives
Preceded by Drew Saunders	Member of the North Carolina House of Representatives from the 99th district 2009–2011	Succeeded by Rodney Moore
