= North Carolina's 54th House district =

American legislative district

North Carolina's 54th State House of Representatives district
Representative
Robert Reives; D–Goldston
- Demographics: 69% White; 10% Black; 14% Hispanic; 2% Asian; 1% Other; 4% Multiracial
- Population (2024): 87,043

North Carolina's 54th House district is one of 120 districts in the North Carolina House of Representatives. It has been represented by Democrat Robert Reives since 2014.

== Geography ==
Since 2023, the district has included all of Chatham County, as well as part of Randolph County. The district overlaps with the 20th and 25th Senate districts.

== District officeholders since 1985 ==
Representative	Party	Dates	Notes	Counties
District created January 1, 1985.
John Bell McLaughlin (Newell)	Democratic	January 1, 1985 – January 1, 1997		1985–2003; Part of Mecklenburg County.
Drew Saunders (Huntersville)	Democratic	January 1, 1997 – January 1, 2003	Redistricted to the 99th district.	1985–2003; Part of Mecklenburg County.
Joe Hackney (Chapel Hill)	Democratic	January 1, 2003 – January 1, 2013	Redistricted from the 24th district. Retired.	2003–2005; All of Chatham County. Part of Orange County.
Joe Hackney (Chapel Hill)	Democratic	January 1, 2003 – January 1, 2013	Redistricted from the 24th district. Retired.	2005–2013; All of Chatham County. Parts of Orange and Moore counties.
Deb McManus (Siler City)	Democratic	January 1, 2013 – December 11, 2013	Resigned.	2013–2019; All of Chatham County. Part of Lee County.
Vacant		December 11, 2013 – January 29, 2014		2013–2019; All of Chatham County. Part of Lee County.
Robert Reives (Goldston)	Democratic	January 29, 2014 – Present	Appointed to finish McManus' term.	2013–2019; All of Chatham County. Part of Lee County.
Robert Reives (Goldston)	Democratic	January 29, 2014 – Present	Appointed to finish McManus' term.	2019–2023; All of Chatham County. Part of Durham County.
Robert Reives (Goldston)	Democratic	January 29, 2014 – Present	Appointed to finish McManus' term.	2023–Present; All of Chatham County. Part of Randolph County.

== Election results ==
=== 2024 ===
North Carolina House of Representatives 54th district general election, 2024
Party	Candidate	Votes	%
Democratic	Robert Reives (incumbent)	29,910	54.76%
Republican	Joe Godfrey	24,714	45.24%
Total votes		54,624	100%
Democratic hold			

=== 2022 ===
North Carolina House of Representatives 54th district Republican primary election, 2022
Party	Candidate	Votes	%
Republican	Walter Petty	4,443	64.25%
Republican	Craig Kinsey	2,472	35.75%
Total votes		6,915	100%

North Carolina House of Representatives 54th district general election, 2022
Party	Candidate	Votes	%
Democratic	Robert Reives (incumbent)	23,105	55.29%
Republican	Walter Petty	18,684	44.71%
Total votes		41,789	100%
Democratic hold			

=== 2020 ===
North Carolina House of Representatives 54th district general election, 2020
Party	Candidate	Votes	%
Democratic	Robert Reives (incumbent)	37,825	61.22%
Republican	George T. Gilson Jr.	23,957	38.78%
Total votes		61,782	100%
Democratic hold			

=== 2018 ===
North Carolina House of Representatives 54th district general election, 2018
Party	Candidate	Votes	%
Democratic	Robert Reives (incumbent)	29,664	63.27%
Republican	Jay Stobbs	17,219	36.73%
Total votes		46,883	100%
Democratic hold			

=== 2016 ===
North Carolina House of Representatives 54th district general election, 2016
Party	Candidate	Votes	%
Democratic	Robert Reives (incumbent)	24,773	57.20%
Republican	Wesley Seawell	18,534	42.80%
Total votes		43,307	100%
Democratic hold			

=== 2014 ===
North Carolina House of Representatives 54th district Democratic primary election, 2014
Party	Candidate	Votes	%
Democratic	Robert Reives (incumbent)	5,739	68.35%
Democratic	Barry E. Burns	2,657	31.65%
Total votes		8,396	100%

North Carolina House of Representatives 54th district general election, 2014
Party	Candidate	Votes	%
Democratic	Robert Reives (incumbent)	16,875	56.19%
Republican	Andy Wilkie	13,156	43.81%
Total votes		30,031	100%
Democratic hold			

=== 2012 ===
North Carolina House of Representatives 54th district Democratic primary election, 2012
Party	Candidate	Votes	%
Democratic	Deb McManus	7,447	59.20%
Democratic	Jeff Starkweather	5,132	40.80%
Total votes		12,579	100%

North Carolina House of Representatives 54th district general election, 2012
Party	Candidate	Votes	%
Democratic	Deb McManus	22,159	56.10%
Republican	Cathy Wright	17,339	43.90%
Total votes		39,498	100%
Democratic hold			

=== 2010 ===
North Carolina House of Representatives 54th district general election, 2010
Party	Candidate	Votes	%
Democratic	Joe Hackney (incumbent)	18,048	57.45%
Republican	Cathy Wright	13,368	42.55%
Total votes		31,416	100%
Democratic hold			

=== 2008 ===
North Carolina House of Representatives 54th district general election, 2008
Party	Candidate	Votes	%
Democratic	Joe Hackney (incumbent)	31,212	100%
Total votes		31,212	100%
Democratic hold			

=== 2006 ===
North Carolina House of Representatives 54th district general election, 2006
Party	Candidate	Votes	%
Democratic	Joe Hackney (incumbent)	15,649	69.78%
Republican	Alvin Reed	6,776	30.22%
Total votes		22,425	100%
Democratic hold			

=== 2004 ===
North Carolina House of Representatives 54th district general election, 2004
Party	Candidate	Votes	%
Democratic	Joe Hackney (incumbent)	24,939	100%
Total votes		24,939	100%
Democratic hold			

=== 2002 ===
North Carolina House of Representatives 54th district general election, 2002
Party	Candidate	Votes	%
Democratic	Joe Hackney (incumbent)	18,508	86.22%
Libertarian	Frederick Blackburn	2,957	13.78%
Total votes		21,465	100%
Democratic hold			

=== 2000 ===
North Carolina House of Representatives 54th district general election, 2000
Party	Candidate	Votes	%
Democratic	Drew Saunders (incumbent)	20,097	55.19%
Republican	Wes Southern	16,319	44.81%
Total votes		36,416	100%
Democratic hold			
