= Jerry Dockham =

American politician from North Carolina

Representative Jerry Dockham
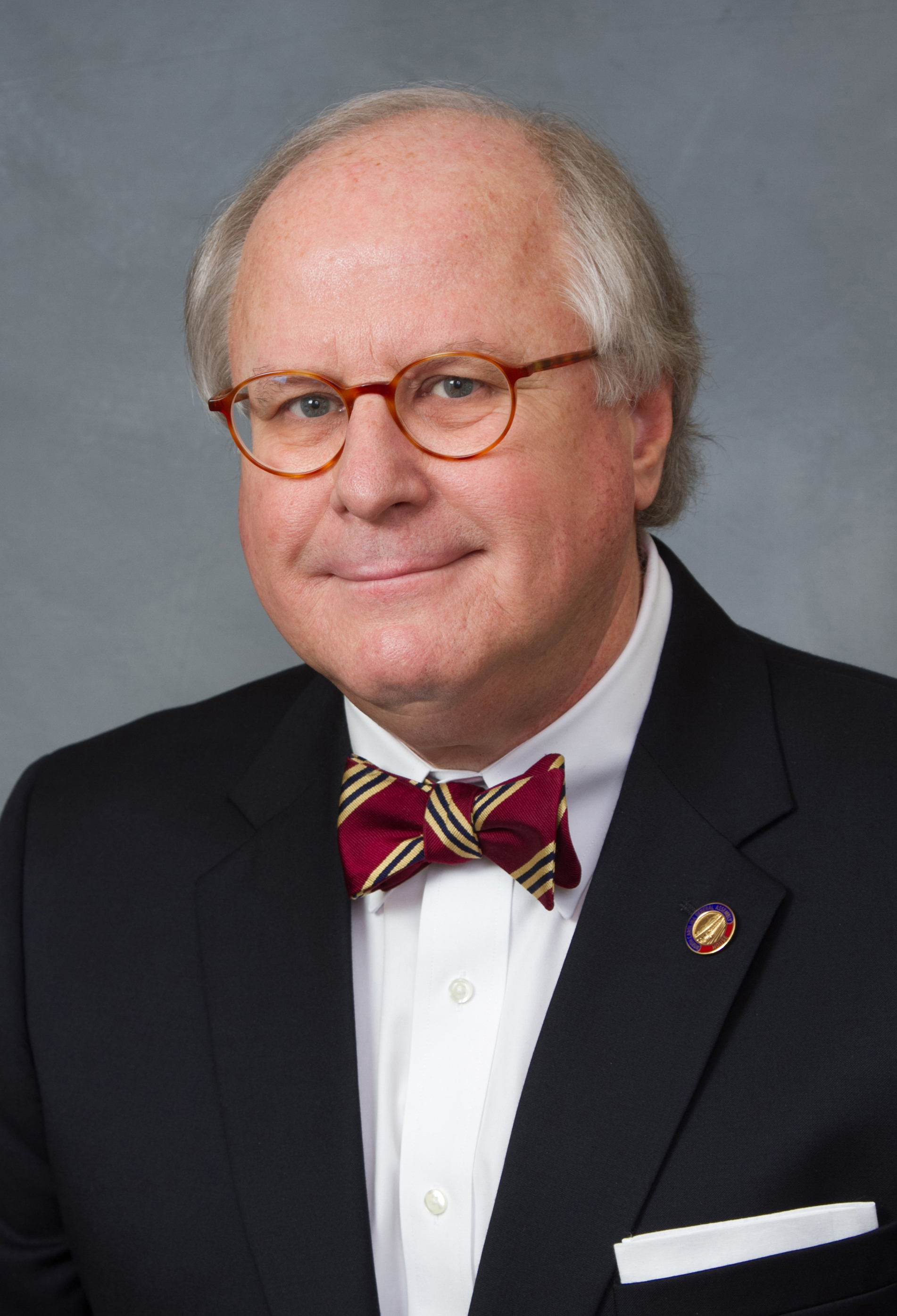

Member of the North Carolina House of Representatives
- In office January 1, 1991 – July 1, 2013
- Preceded by: Charles Lemuel Cromer
- Succeeded by: Roger Younts
- Constituency: 37th District (1991-1993); 94th District (1993-2003); 80th District (2003-2013)

Personal details
- Born: Jerry Charles Dockham; March 22, 1950 (age 76) Denton, North Carolina, U.S.
- Party: Republican
- Spouse: Louise
- Education: Wake Forest University (BS)
- Occupation: Insurance Professional

Jerry Charles Dockham (born March 22, 1950) is a former Republican member of the North Carolina General Assembly, who represented the state's 80th House district, including constituents in Davidson County. Dockham served 11.5 full terms in the North Carolina House of Representatives. He is a former insurance professional for Nationwide from Denton, North Carolina.

== Education ==
Rep. Dockham graduated from Denton High School in 1968. In 1972, Rep. Dockham, earned his Bachelor of Science Degree from Wake Forest University.

== Personal life ==
Jerry is married to Louise S. Dockham, a teacher assistant at Denton Elementary School. Jerry and Louise have two sons. Both Jerry and Louise Dockham are natives of Denton and graduated from Denton High School together.

== North Carolina House of Representatives ==
Jerry is consistently ranked in the top 10% of the 120 members of the North Carolina House of Representatives. In 1998, Rep. Dockham was chosen as Legislator of the Year by the N.C. Society of Anesthesiologists.

Dockham resigned his seat on July 1, 2013 after his appointment to the North Carolina Utilities Commission.

=== Electoral history ===
==== 2012 ====
North Carolina House of Representatives 80th district Republican primary election, 2012
Party	Candidate	Votes	%
Republican	Jerry Dockham (incumbent)	5,432	52.51%
Republican	Christy Jones	3,086	29.83%
Republican	Dick Johnson	1,827	17.66%
Total votes		10,345	100%

North Carolina House of Representatives 80th district general election, 2012
Party	Candidate	Votes	%
Republican	Jerry Dockham (incumbent)	24,080	68.63%
Democratic	Loretta M. Martin	11,009	31.37%
Total votes		35,089	100%
Republican hold			

==== 2010 ====
North Carolina House of Representatives 80th district Republican primary election, 2010
Party	Candidate	Votes	%
Republican	Jerry Dockham (incumbent)	5,105	64.08%
Republican	Dick Johnson	2,861	35.92%
Total votes		7,966	100%

North Carolina House of Representatives 80th district general election, 2010
Party	Candidate	Votes	%
Republican	Jerry Dockham (incumbent)	16,593	100%
Total votes		16,593	100%
Republican hold			

==== 2008 ====
North Carolina House of Representatives 80th district general election, 2008
Party	Candidate	Votes	%
Republican	Jerry Dockham (incumbent)	27,537	100%
Total votes		27,537	100%
Republican hold			

==== 2006 ====
North Carolina House of Representatives 80th district general election, 2006
Party	Candidate	Votes	%
Republican	Jerry Dockham (incumbent)	10,801	100%
Total votes		10,801	100%
Republican hold			

==== 2004 ====
North Carolina House of Representatives 80th district general election, 2004
Party	Candidate	Votes	%
Republican	Jerry Dockham (incumbent)	24,367	100%
Total votes		24,367	100%
Republican hold			

==== 2002 ====
North Carolina House of Representatives 80th district general election, 2002
Party	Candidate	Votes	%
Republican	Jerry Dockham (incumbent)	15,662	100%
Total votes		15,662	100%
Republican hold			

==== 2000 ====
North Carolina House of Representatives 94th district general election, 2000
Party	Candidate	Votes	%
Republican	Jerry Dockham (incumbent)	15,369	88.94%
Libertarian	Ken Younts	1,912	11.06%
Total votes		17,281	100%
Republican hold			

North Carolina House of Representatives
Preceded by Charles Lemuel Cromer	Member of the North Carolina House of Representatives from the 37th district 1991–1993; Served alongside: Joe H. Hege Jr., Julia Craven Howard	Succeeded by Paul Reeves McCrary
Preceded by Constituency established	Member of the North Carolina House of Representatives from the 94th district 1993–2003	Succeeded by Michael Decker
Preceded by Robert Grady	Member of the North Carolina House of Representatives from the 80th district 2003–2013	Succeeded by Roger Younts
