= North Carolina's 99th House district =

American legislative district

North Carolina's 99th State House of Representatives district
Representative
Nasif Majeed; I–Charlotte
- Demographics: 23% White; 45% Black; 19% Hispanic; 9% Asian; 1% Other; 4% Multiracial
- Population (2024): 85,299

North Carolina's 99th House district is one of 120 districts in the North Carolina House of Representatives. It has been represented by Democrat-turned-Independent Nasif Majeed since 2019.

== Geography ==
Since 2003, the district has included part of Mecklenburg County. The district overlaps with the 38th, 40th, and 41st Senate districts.

== District officeholders ==
Representative	Party	Dates	Notes	Counties
District created January 1, 2003.				2003–Present; Part of Mecklenburg County.
Drew Saunders (Huntersville)	Democratic	January 1, 2003 – January 1, 2009	Redistricted from the 54th district. Lost re-nomination.	2003–Present; Part of Mecklenburg County.
Nick Mackey (Charlotte)	Democratic	January 1, 2009 – January 1, 2011	Lost re-nomination.	2003–Present; Part of Mecklenburg County.
Rodney Moore (Charlotte)	Democratic	January 1, 2011 – January 1, 2019	Lost re-nomination.	2003–Present; Part of Mecklenburg County.
Nasif Majeed (Charlotte)	Democratic	January 1, 2019 – April 27, 2026	Lost re-nomination.	2003–Present; Part of Mecklenburg County.
Nasif Majeed (Charlotte)	Independent	April 27, 2026 – present	Lost re-nomination.	2003–Present; Part of Mecklenburg County.

== Election results ==
=== 2026 ===
North Carolina House of Representatives 99th district Democratic primary election, 2026
Party	Candidate	Votes	%
Democratic	Veleria Levy	4,966	68.56%
Democratic	Nasif Majeed (incumbent)	1,896	26.18%
Democratic	Tucker Neal	381	5.26%
Total votes		7,243	100%

North Carolina House of Representatives 99th district general election, 2026
Party	Candidate	Votes	%
Democratic	Veleria Levy		100%
Total votes			100%
Democratic hold			

=== 2024 ===
North Carolina House of Representatives 99th district general election, 2024
Party	Candidate	Votes	%
Democratic	Nasif Majeed (incumbent)	27,772	86.40%
Libertarian	Rob Yates	4,373	13.60%
Total votes		32,145	100%
Democratic hold			

=== 2022 ===
North Carolina House of Representatives 99th district general election, 2022
Party	Candidate	Votes	%
Democratic	Nasif Majeed (incumbent)	13,364	82.54%
Republican	Michael Anderson	2,826	17.46%
Total votes		16,190	100%
Democratic hold			

=== 2020 ===
North Carolina House of Representatives 99th district general election, 2020
Party	Candidate	Votes	%
Democratic	Nasif Majeed (incumbent)	28,226	64.57%
Republican	Russell Rowe	15,486	35.43%
Total votes		43,712	100%
Democratic hold			

=== 2018 ===
North Carolina House of Representatives 99th district Democratic primary election, 2018
Party	Candidate	Votes	%
Democratic	Nasif Majeed	3,010	57.27%
Democratic	Priscilla "PJ" Johnson	1,187	22.58%
Democratic	Rodney Moore (incumbent)	879	16.72%
Democratic	Jackson Pethal	180	3.42%
Total votes		5,256	100%

North Carolina House of Representatives 99th district general election, 2018
Party	Candidate	Votes	%
Democratic	Nasif Majeed	21,915	82.35%
Republican	Joshua Niday	4,696	17.65%
Total votes		26,611	100%
Democratic hold			

=== 2016 ===
North Carolina House of Representatives 99th district general election, 2016
Party	Candidate	Votes	%
Democratic	Rodney Moore (incumbent)	28,838	100%
Total votes		28,838	100%
Democratic hold			

=== 2014 ===
North Carolina House of Representatives 99th district general election, 2014
Party	Candidate	Votes	%
Democratic	Rodney Moore (incumbent)	15,189	100%
Total votes		15,189	100%
Democratic hold			

=== 2012 ===
North Carolina House of Representatives 99th district general election, 2012
Party	Candidate	Votes	%
Democratic	Rodney Moore (incumbent)	28,282	100%
Total votes		28,282	100%
Democratic hold			

=== 2010 ===
North Carolina House of Representatives 99th district Democratic primary election, 2010
Party	Candidate	Votes	%
Democratic	Rodney Moore	1,660	61.73%
Democratic	Nick Mackey (incumbent)	1,029	38.27%
Total votes		2,689	100%

North Carolina House of Representatives 99th district Republican primary election, 2010
Party	Candidate	Votes	%
Republican	Michael T. Wilson	637	69.16%
Republican	Gwendolyn D. McGowens	284	30.84%
Total votes		921	100%

North Carolina House of Representatives 99th district general election, 2010
Party	Candidate	Votes	%
Democratic	Rodney Moore	15,591	72.01%
Republican	Michael T. Wilson	6,059	27.99%
Total votes		21,650	100%
Democratic hold			

=== 2008 ===
North Carolina House of Representatives 99th district Democratic primary election, 2008
Party	Candidate	Votes	%
Democratic	Nick Mackey	9,176	53.08%
Democratic	Drew Saunders (incumbent)	8,111	46.92%
Total votes		17,287	100%

North Carolina House of Representatives 99th district general election, 2008
Party	Candidate	Votes	%
Democratic	Nick Mackey	28,106	65.32%
Republican	Dempsey Miller	14,925	34.68%
Total votes		43,031	100%
Democratic hold			

=== 2006 ===
North Carolina House of Representatives 99th district general election, 2006
Party	Candidate	Votes	%
Democratic	Drew Saunders (incumbent)	9,463	100%
Total votes		9,463	100%
Democratic hold			

=== 2004 ===
North Carolina House of Representatives 99th district general election, 2004
Party	Candidate	Votes	%
Democratic	Drew Saunders (incumbent)	20,081	100%
Total votes		20,081	100%
Democratic hold			

=== 2002 ===
North Carolina House of Representatives 99th district general election, 2002
Party	Candidate	Votes	%
Democratic	Drew Saunders (incumbent)	10,636	100%
Total votes		10,636	100%
Democratic hold			
