= North Carolina General Assembly of 2003–04 =

Legislative term in US state of North Carolina

146th North Carolina General Assembly 2003–2004
←	2001–2002	2005–2006	→
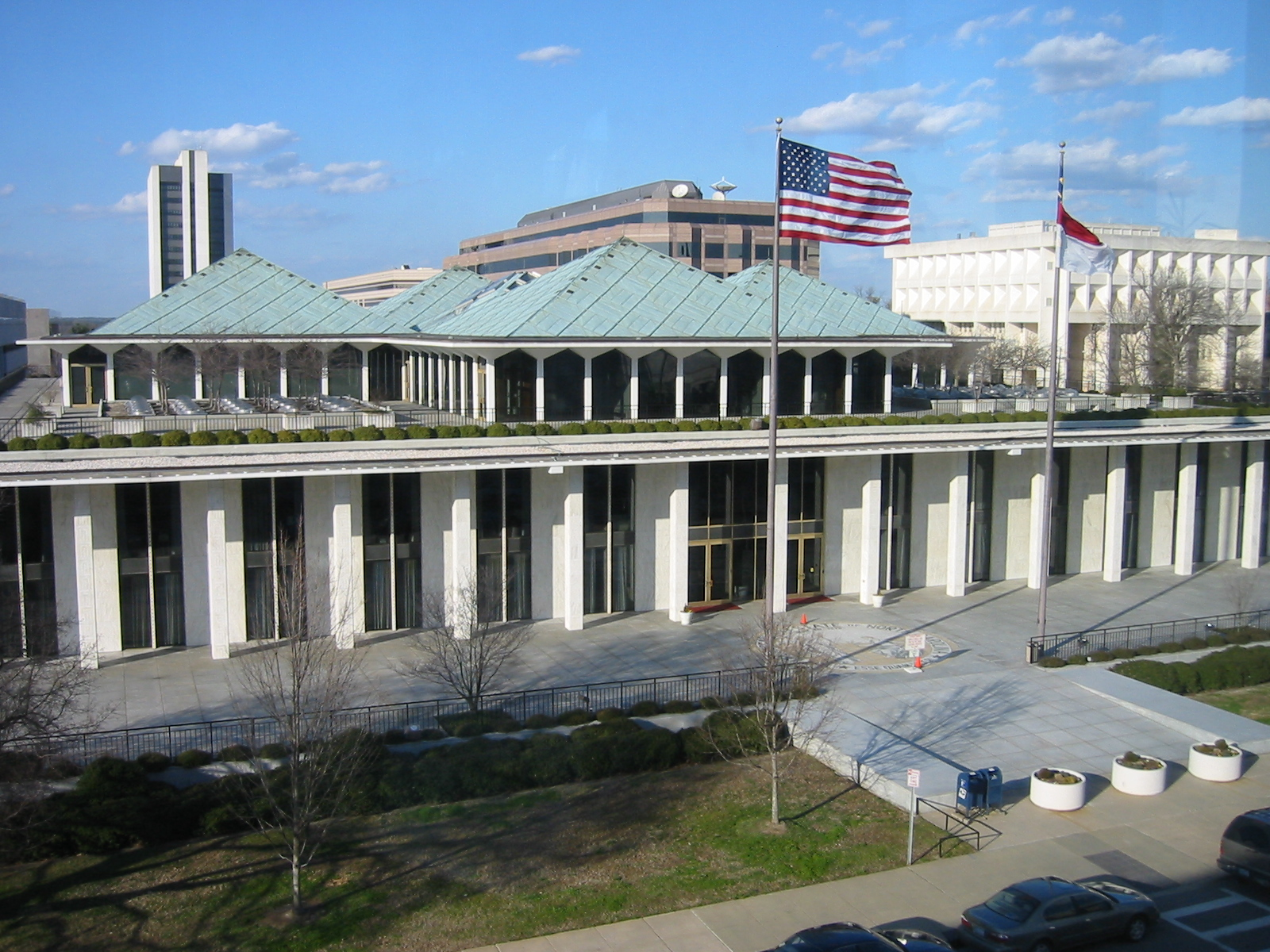
- North Carolina Legislative Building

Overview
- Legislative body: North Carolina General Assembly
- Jurisdiction: North Carolina, United States
- Meeting place: State Legislative Building in Raleigh
- Term: 2003–2004
- Website: House Senate

North Carolina Senate
- Members: 50 senators
- President pro tempore: Marc Basnight (Dem)
- Majority Leader: Tony Rand (Dem)
- Minority Leader: Patrick J. Ballantine (Rep)
- Party control: Democratic Party

North Carolina House of Representatives
- Members: 120 representatives
- Co-Speakers of the House: James B. Black (Dem); Richard T. Morgan (Rep)
- Majority Leader: Joe Hackney (Dem)
- Minority Leader: Joe L. Kiser (Rep)
- Party control: Democratic-led power share

The North Carolina General Assembly of 2003–04 was the 146th session of the North Carolina General General Assembly. The assembly is a bicameral body including a House of Representatives and Senate. They both met in Raleigh, North Carolina, in 2003 and 2004. Members of this North Carolina General Assembly were elected on November 5, 2002. The 2002 legislative elections were conducted under an interim redistricting map following the 2000 census; a more permanent redistricting map was passed in November 2003 for use through 2010.

== House of Representatives ==
The North Carolina State House, during the 2003–04 session, consisted of 60 Democrats and 60 Republicans; consequently, Democratic and Republican co-speakers shared leadership of the body. The representatives included 29 women, 18 African Americans, one Native American, and one Hispanic and Latino American.

Note: Rep. Michael P. Decker changed party affiliation September 16, 2003. Rep. Alex Warner changed party affiliation August 20, 2004.

=== House leaders ===
North Carolina House officers
Position	Name	Party
Co-Speaker	James B. Black	Democratic
Co-Speaker	Richard T. Morgan	Republican
Majority Leader	Joe Hackney	Democratic
Majority Whips	Beverly M. Earle	Democratic
Majority Whips	R. Phillip Haire	Democratic
Majority Whips	Marian N. McLawhorn	Democratic
Majority Whips	Paul Miller	Democratic
Minority Leader	Joe L. Kiser	Republican
Minority Whip	Trudi Walend	Republican
Deputy Minority Whip	Carolyn H. Justice	Republican
Freshman Leaders	Rick Glazier	Democratic
Freshman Leaders	John I. Sauls	Republican

- Permanent Democratic Caucus Chair: Edd Nye (22nd district)

=== House members ===
North Carolina House members 2003–04
District	Representative	Party	Residence	Counties represented
1st	William C. Owens Jr.	Democratic	Elizabeth City	Camden , Currituck , Gates , Pasquotank
2nd	William T. Culpepper III	Democratic	Edenton	Chowan , Dare , Gates , Perquimans , Tyrrell
3rd	Michael A. Gorman	Republican	Trent Woods	Craven , Pamlico
4th	Charles Elliott Johnson	Democratic	Greenville	Craven , Martin , Pitt
5th	Howard J. Hunter Jr.	Democratic	Ahoskie	Bertie , Hertford , Northampton
6th	Arthur J. Williams	Democratic	Washington	Beaufort , Hyde , Washington
7th	John D. Hall	Democratic	Scotland Neck	Halifax , Nash
8th	Edith D. Warren	Democratic	Farmville	Greene , Martin , Pitt
9th	Marian N. McLawhorn	Democratic	Grifton	Pitt
10th	Stephen A. LaRoque	Republican	Kinston	Duplin , Lenoir
11th	Louis M. Pate Jr.	Republican	Mount Olive	Wayne
12th	William L. Wainwright	Democratic	Havelock	Craven , Jones , Lenoir
13th	Jean R. Preston	Republican	Emerald Isle	Carteret , Onslow
14th	Keith P. Williams	Republican	Hubert	Onslow
15th	W. Robert Grady	Republican	Jacksonville	Onslow
16th	Carolyn Justice	Republican	Hampstead	New Hanover , Pender
17th	Bonner L. Stiller	Republican	Oak Island	Brunswick , New Hanover
18th	Thomas E. Wright	Democratic	Wilmington	Brunswick , Columbus , New Hanover
19th	Danny McComas	Republican	Wilmington	New Hanover
20th	Dewey Hill	Democratic	Whiteville	Brunswick
21st	Larry Bell	Democratic	Clinton	Duplin , Sampson , Wayne
22nd	Edd Nye	Democratic	Elizabethtown	Bladen , Sampson
23rd	Joe Tolson	Democratic	Pinetops	Edgecombe , Wilson
24th	Jean Farmer-Butterfield	Democratic	Wilson	Edgecombe , Wilson
25th	William G. Daughtridge Jr.	Republican	Rocky Mount	Nash
26th	Billy J. Creech	Republican	Clayton	Johnston , Wayne
27th	Stanley H. Fox	Democratic	Oxford	Granville , Vance , Warren
28th	Leo Daughtry	Republican	Smithfield	Johnston
29th	Paul Miller	Democratic	Durham	Durham
30th	Paul Luebke	Democratic	Durham	Durham
31st	Mickey Michaux	Democratic	Durham	Durham
32nd	Jim Crawford	Democratic	Oxford	Durham , Granville , Vance
33rd	Bernard Allen	Democratic	Raleigh	Wake
34th	Don Munford	Republican	Raleigh	Wake
35th	Jennifer Weiss	Democratic	Cary	Wake
36th	David Miner	Republican		Wake
37th	Paul Stam	Republican	Apex	Wake
38th	Deborah Ross	Democratic	Raleigh	Wake
39th	Sam Ellis	Republican	Raleigh	Wake
40th	Rick Eddins	Republican	Raleigh	Wake
41st	Margaret Dickson	Democratic	Fayetteville	Cumberland , Harnett
42nd	Marvin Lucas	Democratic	Spring Lake	Cumberland , Harnett
43rd	Mary McAllister	Democratic	Fayetteville	Cumberland
44th	Rick Glazier	Democratic	Fayetteville	Cumberland
45th	Alex Warner (Note: Rep. Alex Warner changed party affiliation August 20, 2004)	Democratic	Hope Mills	Cumberland
46th	Douglas Yongue	Democratic	Laurinburg	Hoke , Robeson , Scotland
47th	Ronnie Sutton	Democratic	Pembroke	Hoke , Robeson
48th	Donald Bonner	Democratic	Rowland	Hoke , Robeson , Scotland
49th	Lucy Allen	Democratic	Louisburg	Franklin , Halifax , Warren
50th	Russell Capps	Republican	Raleigh	Wake
51st	John Sauls	Republican	Sanford	Harnett , Lee , Moore
52nd	Richard Morgan	Republican	Pinehurst	Moore
53rd	David Lewis	Republican	Dunn	Harnett
54th	Joe Hackney	Democratic	Chapel Hill	Chatham , Orange
55th	Gordon Allen	Democratic	Roxboro	Orange , Person
56th	Verla Insko	Democratic	Chapel Hill	Orange
57th	Joanne Bowie	Republican	Greensboro	Guilford
58th	Alma Adams	Democratic	Greensboro	Guilford
59th	Maggie Jeffus	Democratic	Greensboro	Guilford
60th	Earl Jones	Democratic	Greensboro	Guilford
61st	Stephen Wood	Republican		Guilford
62nd	John Blust	Republican	Greensboro	Guilford
63rd	Alice Bordsen	Democratic	Mebane	Alamance
64th	Cary Allred	Republican	Burlington	Alamance
65th	Nelson Cole	Democratic	Reidsville	Rockingham
66th	Wayne Sexton	Republican	Eden	Forsyth , Rockingham
67th	Arlie Culp	Republican	Ramseur	Randolph
68th	Wayne Goodwin	Democratic	Hamlet	Richmond , Stanly
69th	Pryor Gibson	Democratic	Wadesboro	Anson , Montgomery , Union
70th	Bobby Barbee	Republican	Locust	Stanly , Union
71st	Larry Womble	Democratic	Winston-Salem	Forsyth
72nd	Earline Parmon	Democratic	Winston-Salem	Forsyth
73rd	Curtis Blackwood	Republican	Matthews	Union
74th	Linda Johnson	Republican	Kannapolis	Cabarrus
75th	Jeff Barnhart	Republican	Concord	Cabarrus
76th	Gene McCombs (Note: Died January 20, 2004.); Fred Steen II (Note: Appointed February 16, 2004.)	Republican	Faith; Landis	Rowan
77th	Lorene Coates	Democratic	Salisbury	Rowan
78th	Harold Brubaker	Republican	Asheboro	Randolph
79th	Julia Craven Howard	Republican	Mocksville	Davidson , Davie , Iredell
80th	Jerry Dockham	Republican	Denton	Davidson
81st	Hugh Holliman	Democratic	Lexington	Davidson
82nd	Gene Wilson	Republican	Boone	Ashe , Watauga
83rd	Tracy Walker	Republican	Wilkesboro	Wilkes
84th	Phillip Frye	Republican	Spruce Pine	Avery , Caldwell , Mitchell
85th	Mitch Gillespie	Republican	Marion	Burke , Caldwell , McDowell
86th	Walt Church	Democratic	Valdese	Burke
87th	Edgar Starnes	Republican	Granite Falls	Alexander , Caldwell
88th	Mark Hilton	Republican	Conover	Catawba
89th	Mitchell Setzer	Republican	Catawba	Catawba
90th	Jim Harrell	Democratic	Elkin	Alleghany , Surry
91st	Rex Baker	Republican	King	Forsyth , Stokes , Surry
92nd	George Holmes	Republican	Hamptonville	Forsyth , Yadkin
93rd	Bill McGee	Republican	Clemmons	Forsyth
94th	Michael Decker (Note: Changed party affiliation September 16, 2003.)	Republican	Walkertown	Forsyth
95th	Karen Ray	Republican	Mooresville	Catawba , Iredell
96th	Frank Mitchell	Republican	Olin	Iredell
97th	Joe Kiser	Republican	Vale	Lincoln
98th	John Rhodes	Republican	Huntersville	Mecklenburg
99th	Drew Saunders	Democratic	Huntersville	Mecklenburg
100th	Jim Black	Democratic	Matthews	Mecklenburg
101st	Beverly Earle	Democratic	Charlotte	Mecklenburg
102nd	Becky Carney	Democratic	Charlotte	Mecklenburg
103rd	Jim Gulley	Republican	Matthews	Mecklenburg
104th	Connie Wilson	Republican	Charlotte	Mecklenburg
105th	Ed McMahan	Republican	Charlotte	Mecklenburg
106th	Martha Alexander	Democratic	Charlotte	Mecklenburg
107th	Pete Cunningham	Democratic	Charlotte	Mecklenburg
108th	John Rayfield	Republican		Gaston
109th	Patrick McHenry	Republican	Cherryville	Gaston
110th	Debbie Clary	Republican	Cherryville	Cleveland , Gaston
111th	Tim Moore	Republican	Kings Mountain	Cleveland
112th	Bob England	Democratic	Ellenboro	Cleveland
113th	Trudi Walend	Republican	Brevard	Henderson , Polk , Transylvania
114th	Martin Nesbitt (Note: Appointed to NC Senate, February 6, 2004.); Susan Fisher (Note: Replaced Nesbitt.)	Democratic	Asheville; Asheville	Buncombe
115th	Bruce Goforth	Democratic	Asheville	Buncombe
116th	Wilma Sherrill	Republican	Asheville	Buncombe
117th	Carolyn Justus	Republican	Hendersonville	Henderson , Transylvania
118th	Ray Rapp	Democratic	Mars Hill	Haywood , Madison , Yancey
119th	Phil Haire	Democratic	Silva	Haywood , Jackson , Macon , Swain
120th	Roger West	Republican	Marble	Cherokee , Clay , Graham , Macon

== Senate members ==
The North Carolina State Senate, during the 2003–04 session, consisted of 28 Democrats and 22 Republicans.

=== Senate leaders ===
North Carolina Senate officers
Position	Name	Party
President Pro Tem	Marc Basnight	Democratic
Deputy President Pro Tempore	Charlie Smith Dannelly	Democratic
Majority Leader	Tony Rand	Democratic
Majority Whip	Jeanne Hopkins Lucas	Democratic
Deputy Minority Leader	James Forrester	Republican
Minority Whip	Fern Shubert	Republican
Deputy Minority Whip	Tom Apodaca	Republican

- Permanent Democratic Caucus Chair: R. C. Soles Jr.
- Democratic Caucus Secretary: Charles W. Albertson
- Secretary of Republican Caucus: Phil Berger

=== Senate members ===
District	Senator	Party	Residence	Counties represented	First elected
1st	Marc Basnight	Democratic	Manteo	Chowan, Perquimans, Pasquotank, Camden, Currituck, Dare, Hyde, Beaufort	1984
2nd	Scott Thomas	Democratic	New Bern	Carteret, Craven, Pamlico	2000
3rd	Clark Jenkins	Democratic	Tarboro	Edgecombe, Pitt (part), Martin, Bertie, Washington, Tyrrell	2002
4th	Robert Holloman	Democratic	Ahoskie	Vance (part), Warren, Halifax, Northampton, Hertford, Gates	2002
5th	Tony Moore	Democratic	Winterville	Pitt (part), Wilson	2002
5th	Tony Moore	Republican (Note: Switched parties during term.)	Winterville	Pitt (part), Wilson	2002
6th	Cecil Hargett	Democratic	Richlands	Onslow, Jones	2002
7th	John Kerr	Democratic	Goldsboro	Wayne (part), Lenoir, Greene	1992
8th	R. C. Soles Jr.	Democratic	Tabor City	Columbus, Brunswick, Pender	1976
9th	Patrick Ballantine	Republican	Wilmington	New Hanover	1994
9th	Woody White	Republican	Wilmington	New Hanover	2004↑
10th	Charles Albertson	Democratic	Beulaville	Harnett (part), Sampson, Duplin	1992
11th	A. B. Swindell	Democratic	Nashville	Vance (part), Franklin, Nash	2000
12th	Fred Smith	Republican	Clayton	Johnston, Wayne (part)	2002
13th	David Weinstein	Democratic	Lumberton	Robeson, Hoke	1996
14th	Vernon Malone	Democratic	Raleigh	Wake (part)	2002
15th	John Carrington	Republican	Raleigh	Wake (part)	1994
16th	Eric Miller Reeves	Democratic	Raleigh	Wake (part)	1996
17th	Richard Stevens	Republican	Cary	Wake (part)	2002
18th	Wib Gulley	Democratic	Durham	Granville, Person, Durham (part)	1992
19th	Tony Rand	Democratic	Fayetteville	Bladen, Cumberland (part)	1994
20th	Jeanne Hopkins Lucas	Democratic	Durham	Durham (part)	1992
21st	Larry Shaw	Democratic	Fayetteville	Cumberland (part)	1996
22nd	Harris Blake	Republican	Pinehurst	Moore, Lee, Harnett (part)	2002
23rd	Eleanor Kinnaird	Democratic	Carrboro	Orange, Chatham	1996
24th	Hugh Webster	Republican	Burlington	Alamance, Caswell	1994
25th	Bill Purcell	Democratic	Laurinburg	Stanly, Anson, Richmond, Scotland	1997↑
26th	Phil Berger	Republican	Eden	Rockingham, Guilford (part)	2000
27th	Kay Hagan	Democratic	Greensboro	Guilford (part)	1998
28th	Katie Dorsett	Democratic	Greensboro	Guilford (part)	2002
29th	Jerry Tillman	Republican	Archdale	Randolph, Montgomery	2002
30th	John Garwood	Republican	North Wilkesboro	Stokes, Surry, Wilkes (part)	1994
31st	Hamilton C. Horton Jr.	Republican	Winston-Salem	Forsyth (part)	1994
32nd	Linda Garrou	Democratic	Winston-Salem	Forsyth (part)	1998
33rd	Stan Bingham	Republican	Denton	Davidson, Guilford (part)	2000
34th	Andrew Brock	Republican	Mocksville	Rowan (part), Davie, Yadkin	2002
35th	Fern Shubert	Republican	Marshville	Union, Mecklenburg (part)	2002
36th	Fletcher L. Hartsell Jr.	Republican	Concord	Cabarrus, Rowan (part)	1990
37th	Dan Clodfelter	Democratic	Charlotte	Mecklenburg (part)	1998
38th	Charlie Dannelly	Democratic	Charlotte	Mecklenburg (part)	1994
39th	Bob Rucho	Republican	Matthews	Mecklenburg (part)	1996
40th	Robert Pittenger	Republican	Charlotte	Mecklenburg (part)	2002
41st	R. B. Sloan Jr.	Republican	Mooresville	Iredell, Alexander	2002
42nd	James Forrester	Republican	Stanley	Catawba (part), Lincoln, Gaston (part)	1990
43rd	David Hoyle	Democratic	Dallas	Gaston (part)	1992
44th	Austin Allran	Republican	Hickory	Burke, Catawba (part)	1986
45th	Virginia Foxx	Republican	Banner Elk	Alleghany, Ashe, Wilkes (part), Watauga, Caldwell	1994
46th	Walter Dalton	Democratic	Rutherfordton	Cleveland, Rutherford	1996
47th	Joe Sam Queen	Democratic	Waynesville	Haywood (part), Madison, Yancey, McDowell, Mitchell, Avery	2002
48th	Tom Apodaca	Republican	Hendersonville	Buncombe (part), Henderson, Polk	2002
49th	Steve Metcalf (Note: Resigned February 2, 2004.)	Democratic	Asheville	Buncombe (part)	1998
49th	Martin Nesbitt (Note: Appointed February 6, 2004.)	Democratic	Asheville	Buncombe (part)	2004↑
50th	Bob Carpenter	Republican	Franklin	Clay, Cherokee, Graham, Macon, Haywood, Swain, Jackson, Transylvania, Haywood (part)	1988

- ↑: Member was first appointed to office.

== See also ==
- List of North Carolina state legislatures
