= North Carolina General Assembly of 2005–06 =

Legislative term in US state of North Carolina

147th North Carolina General Assembly 2005–06
←	2003–04	2007–08	→
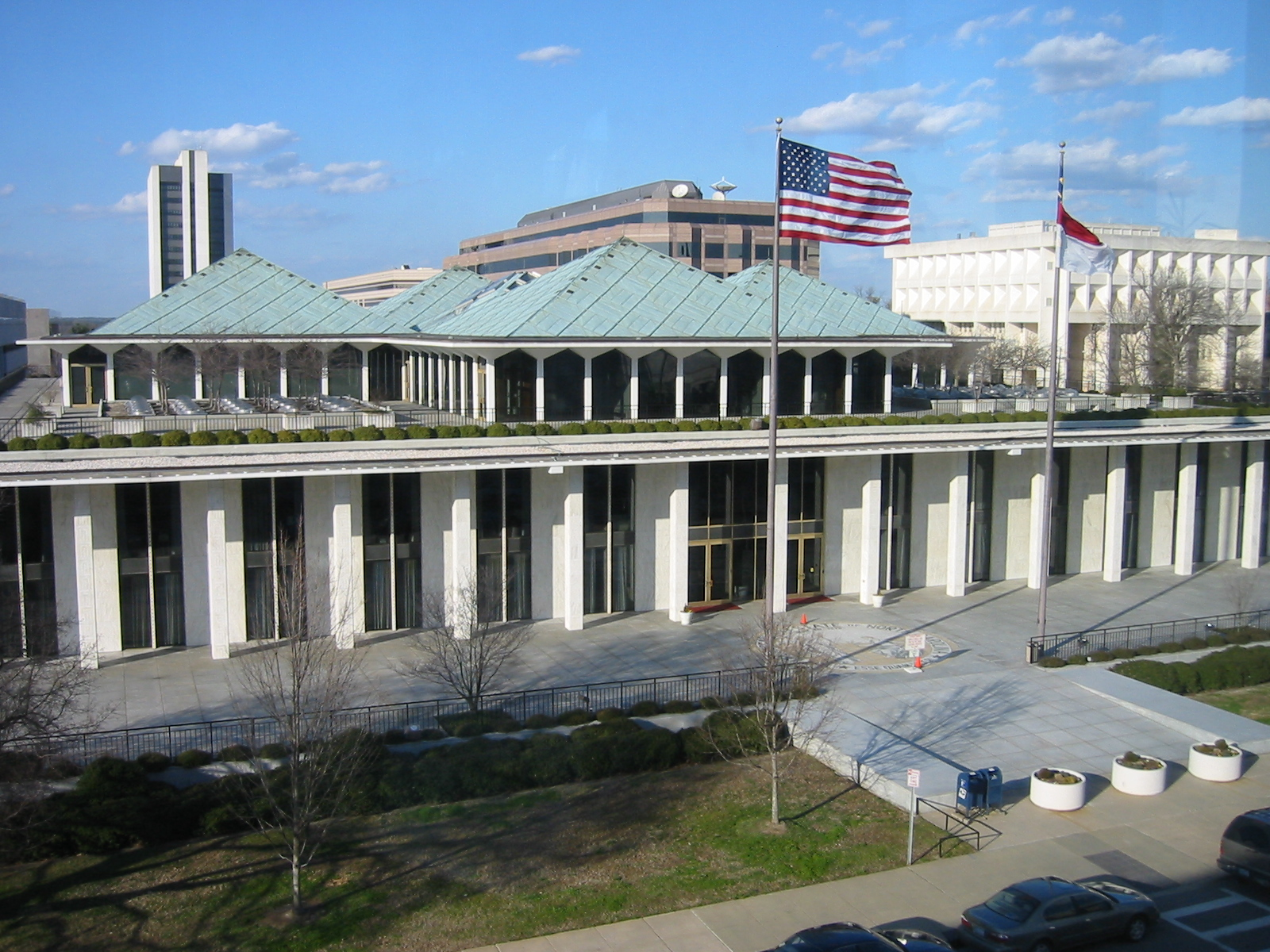
- North Carolina Legislative Building

Overview
- Legislative body: North Carolina General Assembly
- Jurisdiction: North Carolina, United States
- Meeting place: State Legislative Building in Raleigh
- Term: 2005–06
- Website: House Senate

North Carolina Senate
- Members: 50 senators
- President pro tempore: Marc Basnight (Dem)
- Majority Leader: Tony Rand (Dem)
- Minority Leader: Phil Berger (Rep)
- Party control: Democratic Party

North Carolina House of Representatives
- Members: 120 representatives
- Speaker of the House: James B. Black (Dem)
- Speaker pro tempore: Richard T. Morgan (Rep)
- Majority Leader: Joe Hackney (Dem)
- Party control: Democratic Party

The North Carolina General Assembly of 2005–06 was the legislature that was elected on November 2, 2004, by voters in North Carolina. Members of the House of Representatives and Senate met in Raleigh, North Carolina, in 2005 and 2006. These were the first elections for the state legislature under a new redistricting plan approved in 2003. This General Assembly will perhaps be best remembered as the assembly that approved North Carolina's first state lottery. It also approved new ethics laws for government officials and increased the state's minimum wage.

== House of Representatives ==
The North Carolina State House, during the 2005–06 session, consisted of 63 Democrats and 57 Republicans. Several Republicans, Richard T. Morgan most prominent among them, continued to support the Democratic majority on some issues, as they had in the previous legislature (when the house was evenly divided by party).

=== House leaders ===
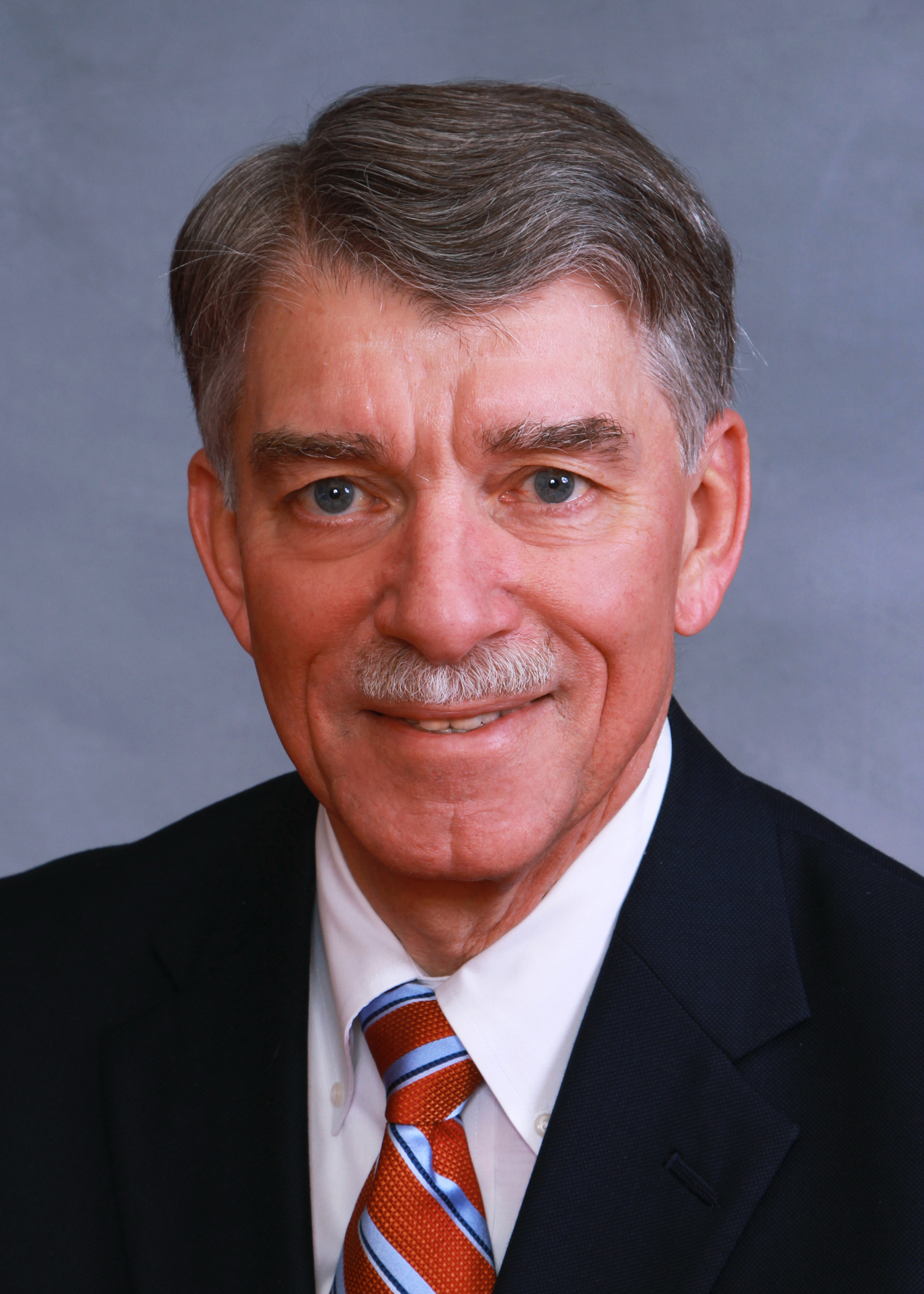
Majority Leader Joe Hackney

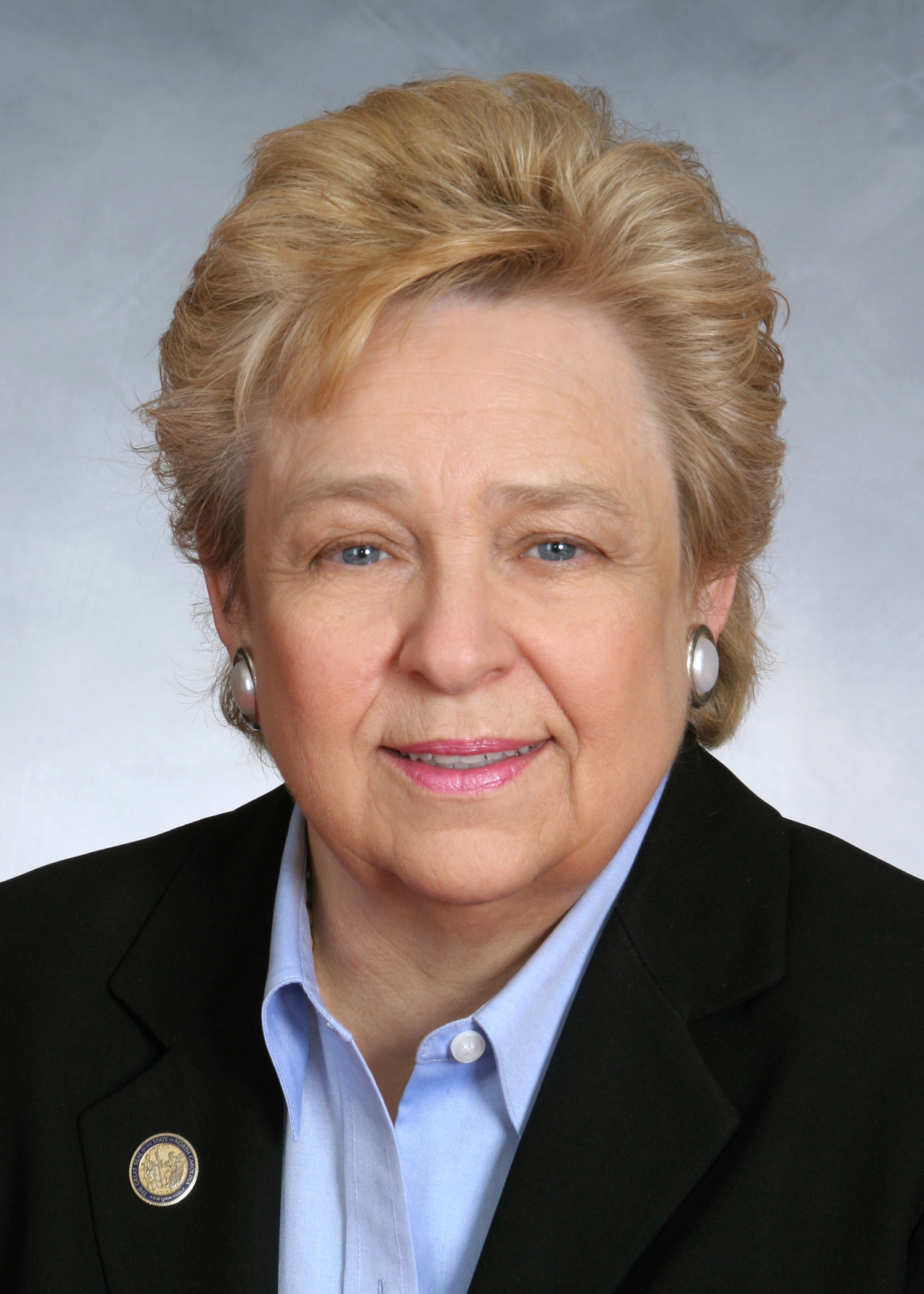
Deputy Minority Whip Carolyn Justice

North Carolina House officers
Position	Name	Party
Majority Leader	Joe Hackney	Democratic
Majority Whips	Marian N. McLawhorn	Democratic
Majority Whips	Hugh Holliman	Democratic
Majority Whips	Larry M. Bell	Democratic
Minority Leader	Joe L. Kiser	Republican
Minority Whip	Mitch Gillespie	Republican
Deputy Minority Whip	Carolyn H. Justice	Republican
Freshman Leaders	Linda Coleman	Democratic
Freshman Leaders	Bryan R. Holloway	Republican
Special Asst. to the Speaker	W. Pete Cunningham	Democratic

=== House members ===
- District 1: William C. Owens Jr. (Dem) – Camden, Currituck, Gates, Pasquotank
- District 2: William T. Culpepper III (Dem); resigned January 3, 2006; replaced by Timothy L. Spear (Dem) – Chowan, Dare, Gates, Perquimans, Tyrrell
- District 3: Alice Graham Underhill (Dem) – Craven, Pamlico
- District 4: Russell E. Tucker (Dem) – Craven, Martin, Pitt
- District 5: Howard J. Hunter Jr. (Dem) – Bertie, Hertford, Northampton
- District 6: Arthur J. Williams (Dem) – Beaufort, Hyde, Washington
- District 7: John D. Hall (Dem); died March 17, 2005; replaced by Edward Jones – Halifax, Nash
- District 8: Edith D. Warren (Dem) – Greene, Martin, Pitt
- District 9: Marian N. McLawhorn (Dem) – Pitt
- District 10: Stephen A. LaRoque (Rep) – Duplin, Lenoir
- District 11: Louis M. Pate Jr. (Rep) – Wayne
- District 12: William L. Wainwright (Dem) – Craven, Jones, Lenoir
- District 13: Jean R. Preston (Rep) – Carteret, Onslow
- District 14: George G. Cleveland (Rep) – Onslow
- District 15: W. Robert Grady (Rep) – Onslow
- District 16: Carolyn H. Justice (Rep) – New Hanover, Pender
- District 17: Bonner L. Stiller (Rep) – Brunswick, New Hanover
- District 18: Thomas E. Wright (Dem) – Brunswick, Columbus, New Hanover
- District 19: Daniel F. McComas (Rep) – New Hanover
- District 20: Dewey L. Hill (Dem) – Brunswick, Columbus
- District 21: Larry M. Bell (Dem) – Duplin, Sampson, Wayne
- District 22: Edd Nye (Dem) – Bladen, Sampson
- District 23: Joe P. Tolson (Dem) – Edgecombe, Wilson
- District 24: Jean Farmer-Butterfield (Dem) – Edgecombe, Wilson
- District 25: William G. Daughtridge Jr. (Rep) – Nash
- District 26: N. Leo Daughtry (Rep) – Johnston, Wayne
- District 27: Michael H. Wray (Dem) – Granville, Vance, Warren
- District 28: James Langdon Jr. (Rep) – Johnston
- District 29: Paul Miller (Dem); resigned 2006; replaced by Larry D. Hall – Durham
- District 30: Paul Luebke (Dem) – Durham
- District 31: Mickey Michaux (Dem) – Durham
- District 32: James W. Crawford Jr. (Dem) – Durham, Granville, Vance
- District 33: Bernard Allen (Dem); died October 2006; replaced by Dan Blue – Wake
- District 34: Grier Martin (Dem) – Wake
- District 35: Jennifer Weiss (Dem) – Wake
- District 36: Nelson Dollar (Rep) – Wake
- District 37: Paul Stam (Rep) – Wake
- District 38: Deborah K. Ross (Dem) – Wake
- District 39: Linda Coleman (Dem) – Wake
- District 40: Rick L. Eddins (Rep) – Wake
- District 41: J. Russell Capps (Rep) – Wake
- District 42: Marvin W. Lucas (Dem) – Cumberland,
- District 43: Mary E. McAllister (Dem) – Cumberland
- District 44: Margaret H. Dickson (Dem) – Cumberland
- District 45: Rick Glazier (Dem) – Cumberland
- District 46: Douglas Y. Yongue (Dem) – Hoke, Robeson, Scotland
- District 47: Ronnie N. Sutton (Dem) – Hoke, Robeson
- District 48: Garland E. Pierce (Dem) – Hoke, Robeson, Scotland
- District 49: Lucy T. Allen (Dem) – Franklin, Halifax, Nash
- District 50: Bill Faison (Dem) – Caswell, Orange
- District 51: John I. Sauls (Rep) – Harnett, Lee
- District 52: Richard T. Morgan (Rep) – Moore
- District 53: David R. Lewis (Rep) – Harnett
- District 54: Joe Hackney (Dem) – Chatham, Orange, Moore
- District 55: Winkie Wilkins (Dem) – Durham, Person
- District 56: Verla C. Insko (Dem) – Orange
- District 57: Pricey Harrison (Dem) – Guilford
- District 58: Alma S. Adams (Dem) – Guilford
- District 59: Maggie Jeffus (Dem) – Guilford
- District 60: Earl Jones (Dem) – Guilford
- District 61: Laura I. Wiley (Rep) – Guilford
- District 62: John M. Blust (Rep) – Guilford
- District 63: Alice L. Bordsen (Dem) – Alamance
- District 64: Cary D. Allred (Rep) – Alamance
- District 65: E. Nelson Cole (Dem) – Rockingham
- District 66: Melanie Wade Goodwin (Dem) – Montgomery, Richmond
- District 67: David Almond (Rep) – Montgomery, Stanly, Union
- District 68: J. Curtis Blackwood Jr. (Rep) – Union
- District 69: Pryor A. Gibson III (Dem) – Anson, Montgomery, Union
- District 70: Arlie F. Culp (Rep) – Randolph
- District 71: Larry W. Womble (Dem) – Forsyth
- District 72: Earline W. Parmon (Dem) – Forsyth
- District 73: Larry R. Brown (Rep) – Forsyth
- District 74: Dale R. Folwell (Rep) – Forsyth
- District 75: William C. McGee (Rep) – Forsyth
- District 76: Fred F. Steen II (Rep) – Rowan
- District 77: Lorene T. Coates (Dem) – Rowan
- District 78: Harold J. Brubaker (Rep) – Randolph
- District 79: Julia C. Howard (Rep) – Davidson, Davie, Iredell
- District 80: Jerry C. Dockham (Rep) – Davidson
- District 81: L. Hugh Holliman (Dem) – Davidson
- District 82: Jeff Barnhart (Rep) – Cabarrus
- District 83: Linda P. Johnson (Rep) Cabarrus
- District 84: Phillip D. Frye (Rep) – Avery, Caldwell, Mitchell
- District 85: Mitch Gillespie (Rep) – Burke, Caldwell, McDowell
- District 86: Walter G. Church, Sr. (Dem) – Burke
- District 87: Edgar V. Starnes (Rep) – Alexander, Caldwell
- District 88: Mark W. Hollo (Rep) – Alexander, Catawba
- District 89: Mitchell S. Setzer (Rep) – Catawba
- District 90: James A. Harrell III (Dem) – Alleghany, Surry
- District 91: Bryan R. Holloway (Rep) – Stokes, Rockingham
- District 92: George M. Holmes (Rep) – Forsyth, Yadkin
- District 93: W. Eugene Wilson (Rep) – Ashe, Watauga
- District 94: R. Tracy Walker (Rep) – Wilkes
- District 95: Karen B. Ray (Rep) – Catawba, Iredell
- District 96: Mark K. Hilton (Rep) – Catawba
- District 97: Joe L. Kiser (Rep) – Lincoln
- District 98: John W. Rhodes (Rep) – Mecklenburg
- District 99: Drew P. Saunders (Dem) – Mecklenburg
- District 100: James B. Black (Dem) – Mecklenburg
- District 101: Beverly M. Earle (Dem) – Mecklenburg
- District 102: Becky Carney (Dem) – Mecklenburg
- District 103: Jim Gulley (Rep) – Mecklenburg
- District 104: W. Edwin McMahan (Rep) – Mecklenburg
- District 105: Doug Vinson (Rep) – Mecklenburg
- District 106: Martha B. Alexander (Dem) – Mecklenburg
- District 107: W. Pete Cunningham (Dem) – Mecklenburg
- District 108: John M. Rayfield (Rep) – Gaston
- District 109: William A. Current (Rep) – Gaston
- District 110: Debbie Clary (Rep) – Cleveland, Gaston
- District 111: Tim Moore (Rep) – Cleveland
- District 112: Bobby F. England (Dem) – Cleveland, Rutherford
- District 113: Trudi Walend (Rep) – Henderson, Polk, Transylvania
- District 114: Susan C. Fisher (Dem) – Buncombe
- District 115: D. Bruce Goforth (Dem) – Buncombe
- District 116: Wilma M. Sherrill (Rep) – Buncombe
- District 117: Carolyn K. Justus (Rep) – Henderson, Transylvania
- District 118: Ray Rapp (Dem) – Haywood, Madison, Yancey
- District 119: R. Phillip Haire (Dem) – Haywood, Jackson, Macon, Swain
- District 120: Roger West (Rep) – Cherokee, Clay, Graham, Macon

== Senate ==
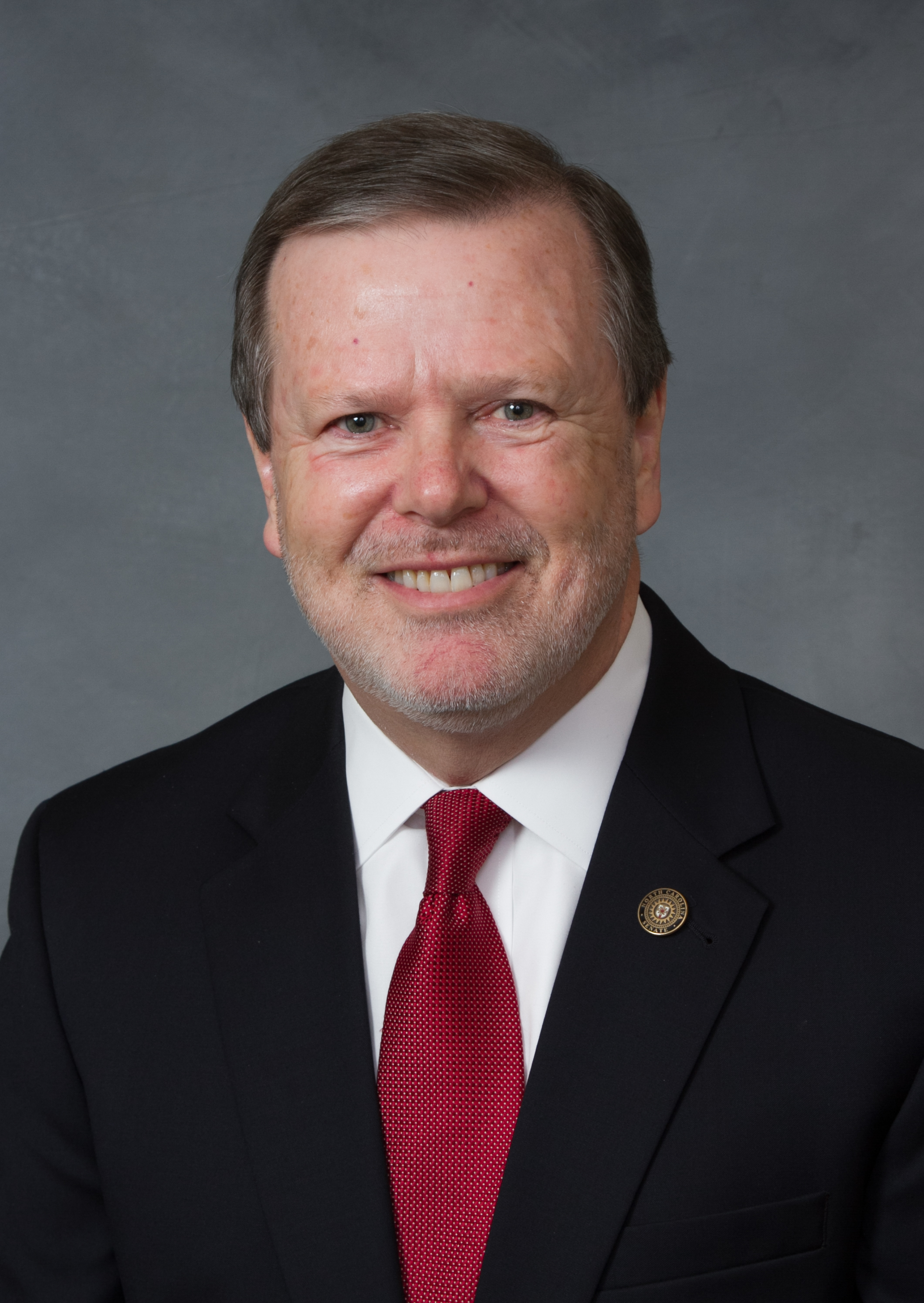
Minority Leader Phil Berger

The North Carolina State Senate, during the 2005–06 session, consisted of 29 Democrats and 21 Republicans.

=== Senate leaders ===
North Carolina Senate officers
Position	Name	Party
President Pro Tem	Marc Basnight	Democratic
Deputy President Pro Tempore	Charlie Smith Dannelly	Democratic
Majority Leader	Tony Rand	Democratic
Majority Whip	Jeanne Hopkins Lucas	Democratic
Deputy Minority Leader	Tom Apodaca	Republican
Assistant Minority Leader	Robert Pittenger	Republican
Minority Whip	Jerry W. Tillman	Republican
Deputy Minority Whip	Andrew C. Brock	Republican

- Permanent Democratic Caucus Chair: R. C. Soles Jr. (8th district)
- Democratic Caucus Secretary: Charles W. Albertson (10th district)

=== Senate members ===
- District 1: Marc Basnight (Dem) – Beaufort, Camden, Chowan, Currituck, Dare, Hyde, Pasquotank, Perquimans
- District 2: Scott Thomas (Dem); resigned; replaced by C. W. Bland – Carteret, Craven, Pamlico
- District 3: Clark Jenkins (Dem) – Bertie, Edgecombe, Martin, Pitt, Tyrrell, Washington
- District 4: Robert Lee Holloman (Dem) – Gates, Halifax, Hertford, Northampton
- District 5: John H. Kerr III (Dem) – Pitt, Wilson, Wayne
- District 6: Harry Brown (Rep) – Jones, Onslow
- District 7: Doug Berger (Dem) – Granville, Vance, Warren, Franklin
- District 8: R. C. Soles Jr. (Dem) – Brunswick, Columbus, Pender
- District 9: Julia Boseman (Dem) – New Hanover
- District 10: Charles W. Albertson (Dem) – Duplin, Harnett, Sampson
- District 11: A. B. Swindell (Dem) – Franklin, Nash, Vance
- District 12: Fred Smith (Rep) – Johnston, Wayne
- District 13: David F. Weinstein (Dem) – Hoke, Robeson
- District 14: Vernon Malone (Dem) – Wake
- District 15: Neal Hunt (Rep) – Wake
- District 16: Janet Cowell (Dem) – Wake
- District 17: Richard Stevens (Rep) – Wake
- District 18: Bob Atwater (Dem) – Durham, Granville, Person
- District 19: Tony Rand (Dem) – Bladen, Cumberland
- District 20: Jeanne Hopkins Lucas (Dem) – Durham
- District 21: Larry Shaw (Dem) – Cumberland
- District 22: Harris Blake (Rep) – Harnett, Lee, Moore
- District 23: Eleanor Kinnaird (Dem) – Chatham, Orange
- District 24: Hugh Webster (Rep) – Alamance, Caswell
- District 25: William R. Purcell (Dem) – Anson, Richmond, Scotland, Stanly
- District 26: Phil Berger (Rep) – Guilford, Rockingham
- District 27: Kay Hagan (Dem) – Guilford
- District 28: Katie G. Dorsett (Dem) – Guilford
- District 29: Jerry W. Tillman (Rep) – Montgomery, Randolph
- District 30: Don W. East (Rep) – Stokes, Surry, Yadkin
- District 31: Hamilton C. Horton Jr. (Rep); died; replaced by Peter S. Brunstetter – Forsyth
- District 32: Linda Garrou (Dem) – Forsyth
- District 33: Stan Bingham (Rep) – Davidson, Guilford
- District 34: Andrew C. Brock (Rep) – Davie, Rowan, Yadkin
- District 35: W. Edward Goodall (Rep) – Mecklenburg, Union
- District 36: Fletcher L. Hartsell Jr. (Rep) – Cabarrus, Rowan
- District 37: Daniel G. Clodfelter (Dem) – Mecklenburg
- District 38: Charlie Smith Dannelly (Dem) – Mecklenburg
- District 39: Robert Pittenger (Rep) – Mecklenburg
- District 40: Malcolm Graham (Dem) – Mecklenburg
- District 41: James Forrester (Rep) – Alexander, Iredell
- District 42: Austin M. Allran (Rep) – Catawba, Gaston, Lincoln
- District 43: David W. Hoyle (Dem) – Gaston
- District 44: Jim Jacumin (Rep) – Burke, Caldwell
- District 45: John Garwood (Rep) – Alleghany, Ashe, Caldwell, Watauga, Wilkes
- District 46: Walter Dalton (Dem) – Cleveland, Rutherford
- District 47: Keith Presnell (Rep) – Avery, Haywood, Madison, McDowell, Mitchell, Yancey
- District 48: Tom Apodaca (Rep) – Buncombe, Henderson, Polk
- District 49: Martin Nesbitt (Dem) – Buncombe
- District 50: John J. Snow Jr. (Dem) – Cherokee, Clay, Graham, Haywood, Jackson, Macon, Swain, Transylvania

== See also ==
- List of North Carolina state legislatures
