= North Carolina General Assembly of 2009–10 =

Legislative term in US state of North Carolina

149th North Carolina General Assembly 2009–10
←	2007–08	2011–12	→
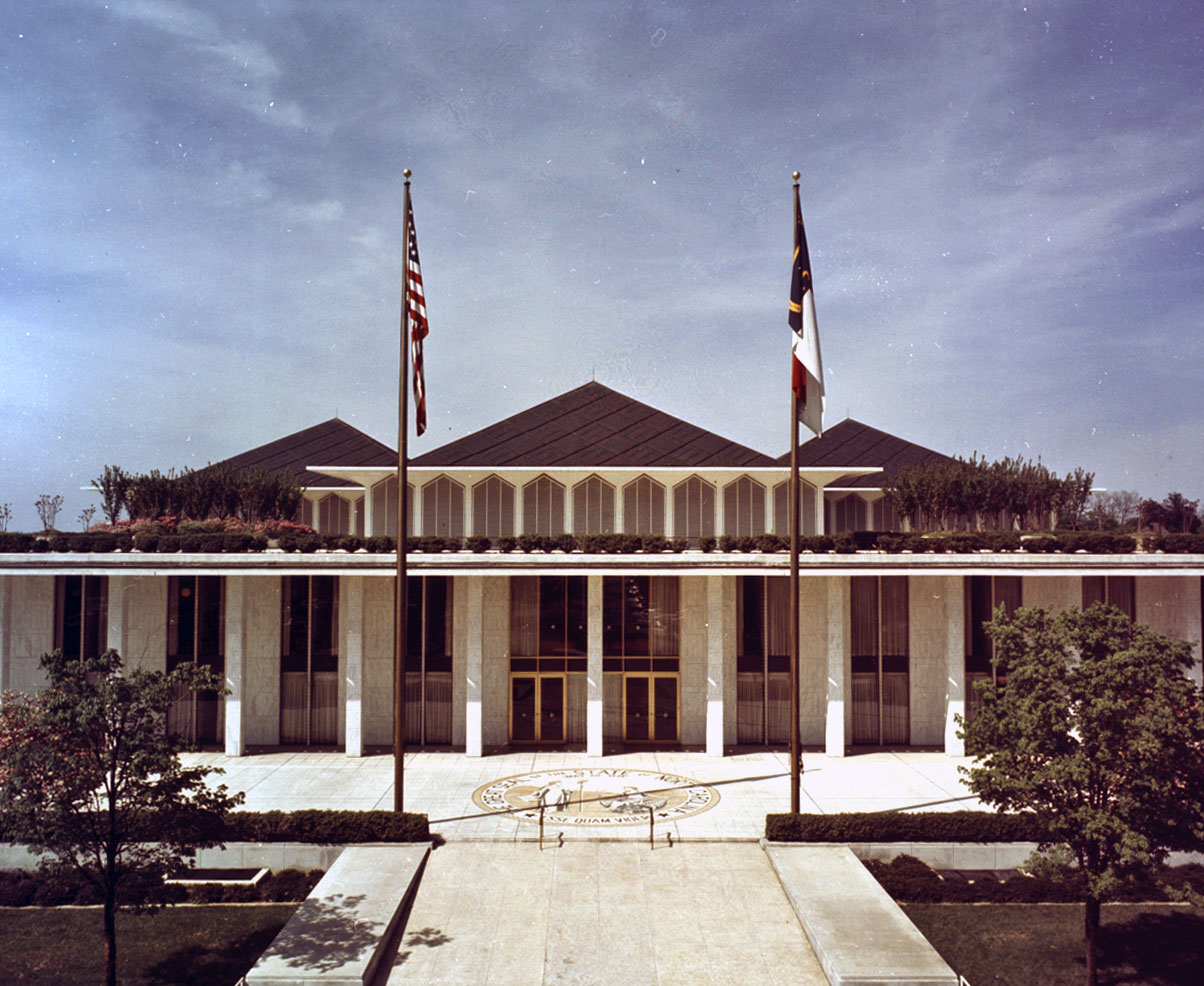
- North Carolina Legislative Building

Overview
- Legislative body: North Carolina General Assembly
- Jurisdiction: North Carolina, United States
- Meeting place: State Legislative Building in Raleigh
- Term: 2009–10
- Website: House Senate

North Carolina Senate
- Members: 50 senators
- President pro tempore: Marc Basnight (Dem)
- Majority Leader: Tony Rand (Dem); Jan. 2009 – Nov. 2009, Martin Nesbitt (Dem); Nov. 2009 – Jan. 2011
- Minority Leader: Phil Berger (Rep)
- Party control: Democratic Party

North Carolina House of Representatives
- Members: 120 representatives
- Speaker: Joe Hackney (Dem)
- Majority Leader: L. Hugh Holliman (Dem)
- Minority Leader: Paul Stam (Rep)
- Party control: Democratic Party

The North Carolina General Assembly 2009–10 was the 149th North Carolina General Assembly. The 50 members of the North Carolina Senate and 120 members of the North Carolina House of Representatives were elected on November 6, 2008. It first convened in January 2009.

== State House of Representatives ==
The North Carolina state House of Representatives, during the 2009–10 session, consisted of 120 members—68 Democrats and 52 Republicans.

=== Leaders ===
North Carolina House officers
Position	Name	Party
Speaker pro tempore	William L. Wainwright	Democratic
Majority Leader	L. Hugh Holliman	Democratic
Majority Whips	Larry M. Bell	Democratic
Majority Whips	Jean Farmer-Butterfield	Democratic
Majority Whips	Deborah K. Ross	Democratic
Majority Whips	D. Bruce Goforth	Democratic
Majority Whips	Larry Hall	Democratic
Minority Whip	Thom Tillis	Republican
Deputy Minority Whips	Carolyn H. Justice	Republican
Deputy Minority Whips	Fred F. Steen II	Republican
Deputy Minority Whips	Nelson Dollar	Republican
Freshman Leaders	Jane Whilden	Democratic
Freshman Leaders	Kelly Alexander	Democratic
Freshman Leaders	Justin Burr	Republican

- Clerk (appointed by the house): Denise Weeks

=== Members ===
- District 1: William C. Owens Jr. (Dem) – Camden, Currituck, Gates, Pasquotank
- District 2: Timothy L. Spear (Dem) – Chowan, Dare, Gates, Perquimans, Tyrrell
- District 3: Alice Graham Underhill (Dem) – Craven, Pamlico
- District 4: Russell E. Tucker (Dem) – Craven, Martin, Pitt
- District 5: Annie Mobley (Dem) – Bertie, Hertford, Northampton
- District 6: Arthur J. Williams (Dem) – Beaufort, Hyde, Washington
- District 7: Angela Bryant (Dem) – Halifax, Nash
- District 8: Edith D. Warren (Dem) – Greene, Martin, Pitt
- District 9: Marian N. McLawhorn (Dem) – Pitt
- District 10: Van Braxton (Dem) – Duplin, Lenoir
- District 11: Efton Sager (Rep) – Wayne
- District 12: William L. Wainwright (Dem) – Craven, Jones, Lenoir
- District 13: Pat McElraft (Rep) – Carteret, Onslow
- District 14: George G. Cleveland (Rep) – Onslow
- District 15: W. Robert Grady (Rep) – Onslow
- District 16: Carolyn H. Justice (Rep) – New Hanover, Pender
- District 17: Bonner L. Stiller (Rep); Resigned, replaced by Frank Iler (Rep) – Brunswick, New Hanover
- District 18: Sandra Spaulding Hughes (Dem) – Columbus, New Hanover
- District 19: Daniel F. McComas (Rep) – New Hanover
- District 20: Dewey L. Hill (Dem) – Brunswick, Columbus
- District 21: Larry M. Bell (Dem) – Duplin, Sampson, Wayne
- District 22: William Brisson (Dem) – Bladen, Sampson
- District 23: Joe P. Tolson (Dem) – Edgecombe, Wilson
- District 24: Jean Farmer-Butterfield (Dem) – Edgecombe, Wilson
- District 25: Randy Stewart (Rep) – Nash
- District 26: N. Leo Daughtry (Rep) – Johnston, Wayne
- District 27: Michael H. Wray (Dem) – Granville, Vance, Warren
- District 28: James Langdon Jr. (Rep) – Johnston
- District 29: Larry Hall (Dem) – Durham
- District 30: Paul Luebke (Dem) – Durham
- District 31: Mickey Michaux (Dem) – Durham
- District 32: James W. Crawford Jr. (Dem) – Durham, Granville, Vance
- District 33: Dan Blue (Dem); Resigned to accept Senate appointment, replaced by Rosa Gill (Dem) – Wake
- District 34: Grier Martin (Dem) – Wake
- District 35: Jennifer Weiss (Dem) – Wake
- District 36: Nelson Dollar (Rep) – Wake
- District 37: Paul Stam (Rep) – Wake
- District 38: Deborah K. Ross (Dem) – Wake
- District 39: Linda Coleman (Dem); Resigned, replaced by Darren Jackson (Dem) – Wake
- District 40: Marilyn Avila (Rep) – Wake
- District 41: Ty Harrell (Dem); Resigned, replaced by Chris Heagarty (Dem) – Wake
- District 42: Marvin W. Lucas (Dem) – Cumberland,
- District 43: Elmer Floyd (Dem) – Cumberland
- District 44: Margaret H. Dickson (Dem); resigned to accept appointment to Senate, replaced by Diane Parfitt (Dem) – Cumberland
- District 45: Rick Glazier (Dem) – Cumberland
- District 46: Douglas Y. Yongue (Dem) – Hoke, Robeson, Scotland
- District 47: Ronnie N. Sutton (Dem) – Hoke, Robeson
- District 48: Garland E. Pierce (Dem) – Hoke, Robeson, Scotland
- District 49: Lucy T. Allen (Dem); resigned to accept seat on the state Utilities Commission, replaced by John May (Dem) – Franklin, Halifax, Nash
- District 50: Bill Faison (Dem) – Caswell, Orange
- District 51: Jimmy L. Love Sr. (Dem) – Harnett, Lee
- District 52: James L. Boles Jr. (Rep) – Moore
- District 53: David R. Lewis (Rep) – Harnett
- District 54: Joe Hackney (Dem) – Chatham, Orange, Moore
- District 55: Winkie Wilkins (Dem) – Durham, Person
- District 56: Verla C. Insko (Dem) – Orange
- District 57: Pricey Harrison (Dem) – Guilford
- District 58: Alma S. Adams (Dem) – Guilford
- District 59: Maggie Jeffus (Dem) – Guilford
- District 60: Earl Jones (Dem) – Guilford
- District 61: Laura I. Wiley (Rep) – Guilford
- District 62: John M. Blust (Rep) – Guilford
- District 63: Alice L. Bordsen (Dem) – Alamance
- District 64: Cary D. Allred (Rep); Resigned, replaced by Dan Ingle (Rep) – Alamance
- District 65: E. Nelson Cole (Dem) – Rockingham
- District 66: Melanie Wade Goodwin (Dem) – Montgomery, Richmond
- District 67: Justin Burr (Rep) – Montgomery, Stanly, Union
- District 68: J. Curtis Blackwood Jr. (Rep) – Union
- District 69: Pryor A. Gibson III (Dem) – Anson, Montgomery, Union
- District 70: Pat B. Hurley (Rep) – Randolph
- District 71: Larry W. Womble (Dem) – Forsyth
- District 72: Earline W. Parmon (Dem) – Forsyth
- District 73: Larry R. Brown (Rep) – Forsyth
- District 74: Dale Folwell (Rep) – Forsyth
- District 75: William C. McGee (Rep) – Forsyth
- District 76: Fred F. Steen II (Rep) – Rowan
- District 77: Lorene T. Coates (Dem) – Rowan
- District 78: Harold J. Brubaker (Rep) – Randolph
- District 79: Julia C. Howard (Rep) – Davidson, Davie, Iredell
- District 80: Jerry C. Dockham (Rep) – Davidson
- District 81: L. Hugh Holliman (Dem) – Davidson
- District 82: Jeff Barnhart (Rep) – Cabarrus
- District 83: Linda P. Johnson (Rep) – Cabarrus
- District 84: Phillip D. Frye (Rep) – Avery, Caldwell, Mitchell
- District 85: Mitch Gillespie (Rep) – Burke, Caldwell, McDowell
- District 86: Hugh Blackwell (Rep) – Burke
- District 87: Edgar V. Starnes (Rep) – Alexander, Caldwell
- District 88: T. Raymond Warren (Dem) – Alexander, Catawba
- District 89: Mitchell S. Setzer (Rep) – Catawba
- District 90: Sarah Stevens (Rep) – Alleghany, Surry
- District 91: Bryan R. Holloway (Rep) – Stokes, Rockingham
- District 92: Darrell McCormick (Rep) – Forsyth, Yadkin
- District 93: Cullie Tarleton (Dem) – Ashe, Watauga
- District 94: Shirley Randleman (Rep) – Wilkes
- District 95: Grey Mills (Rep) – Catawba, Iredell
- District 96: Mark K. Hilton (Rep) – Catawba
- District 97: Johnathan Rhyne Jr. (Rep) – Lincoln
- District 98: Thom Tillis (Rep) – Mecklenburg
- District 99: Nick Mackey (Dem) – Mecklenburg
- District 100: Tricia Cotham (Dem) – Mecklenburg
- District 101: Beverly M. Earle (Dem) – Mecklenburg
- District 102: Becky Carney (Dem) – Mecklenburg
- District 103: Jim Gulley (Rep) – Mecklenburg
- District 104: Ruth Samuelson (Rep) – Mecklenburg
- District 105: Ric Killian (Rep) – Mecklenburg
- District 106: Martha B. Alexander (Dem) – Mecklenburg
- District 107: Kelly Alexander (Dem) – Mecklenburg
- District 108: Wil Neumann (Rep) – Gaston
- District 109: William A. Current (Rep) – Gaston
- District 110: Pearl Burris-Floyd (Rep) – Cleveland, Gaston
- District 111: Tim Moore (Rep) – Cleveland
- District 112: Bobby F. England (Dem) – Cleveland, Rutherford
- District 113: W. David Guice (Rep) – Henderson, Polk, Transylvania
- District 114: Susan C. Fisher (Dem) – Buncombe
- District 115: D. Bruce Goforth (Dem); resigned, replaced by Patsy Keever (Dem) – Buncombe
- District 116: Jane Whilden (Dem) – Buncombe
- District 117: Carolyn K. Justus (Rep) – Henderson, Transylvania
- District 118: Ray Rapp (Dem) – Haywood, Madison, Yancey
- District 119: R. Phillip Haire (Dem) – Haywood, Jackson, Macon, Swain
- District 120: Roger West (Rep) – Cherokee, Clay, Graham, Macon

== State Senate ==
The state Senate, during the 2009–10 session, consisted of 30 Democrats and 20 Republicans.

=== Leaders ===
North Carolina Senate officers
Position	Name	Party
President Pro Tem	Marc Basnight	Democratic
Deputy President Pro Tempore	Charlie Smith Dannelly	Democratic
Majority Leader	Tony Rand; Jan. 2009 – Nov. 2009	Democratic
Majority Leader	Martin Nesbitt; Nov. 2009 – Jan. 2011	Democratic
Majority Whip	Katie G. Dorsett	Democratic
Deputy Minority Leaders	Harry Brown	Republican
Deputy Minority Leaders	Peter Brunstetter	Republican
Deputy Minority Leaders	Neal Hunt	Republican
Minority Whip	Jerry W. Tillman	Republican

- Clerk (appointed by the Senate): Janet Pruitt
- Permanent Democratic Caucus Chair: R. C. Soles Jr. (8th district)
- Democratic Caucus Secretary: Charles W. Albertson (10th district)

=== Members ===
- District 1: Marc Basnight (Dem) – Beaufort, Camden, Currituck, Dare, Hyde, Pasquotank, Tyrrell, Washington
- District 2: Jean R. Preston (Rep) – Carteret, Craven, Pamlico
- District 3: Clark Jenkins (Dem) – Edgecombe, Martin, Pitt
- District 4: Edward Jones (Dem) – Gates, Halifax, Hertford, Northampton, Bertie, Chowan, Perquimans
- District 5: Don Davis (Dem) – Greene, Pitt, Wayne
- District 6: Harry Brown (Rep) – Jones, Onslow
- District 7: Doug Berger (Dem) – Franklin, Granville, Vance, Warren
- District 8: R. C. Soles Jr. (Dem) – Brunswick, Columbus, Pender
- District 9: Julia Boseman (Dem) – New Hanover
- District 10: Charles W. Albertson (Dem) – Duplin, Harnett, Sampson
- District 11: A. B. Swindell (Dem) – Franklin, Nash, Vance
- District 12: David Rouzer (Rep) – Johnston, Wayne
- District 13: David F. Weinstein (Dem); resigned, replaced by Michael P. Walters (Dem) – Hoke, Robeson
- District 14: Vernon Malone (Dem); died, replaced by Dan Blue (Dem) – Wake
- District 15: Neal Hunt (Rep) – Wake
- District 16: Josh Stein (Dem) – Wake
- District 17: Richard Y. Stevens (Rep) – Wake
- District 18: Bob Atwater (Dem) – Durham, Chatham, Lee
- District 19: Tony Rand (Dem); resigned Dec. 31, 2009, replaced by Margaret Dickson (Dem) – Bladen, Cumberland
- District 20: Floyd McKissick Jr. (Dem) – Durham
- District 21: Larry Shaw (Dem) – Cumberland
- District 22: Harris Blake (Rep) – Harnett, Lee, Moore
- District 23: Eleanor Kinnaird (Dem) – Chatham, Orange, Person
- District 24: Anthony Foriest (Dem) – Alamance, Caswell
- District 25: William R. Purcell (Dem) – Anson, Richmond, Scotland, Stanly
- District 26: Phil Berger (Rep) – Guilford, Rockingham
- District 27: Don Vaughan (Dem) – Guilford
- District 28: Katie G. Dorsett (Dem) – Guilford
- District 29: Jerry W. Tillman (Rep) – Montgomery, Randolph
- District 30: Donald East (Rep) – Stokes, Surry, Yadkin
- District 31: Peter Brunstetter (Rep) – Forsyth
- District 32: Linda Garrou (Dem) – Forsyth
- District 33: Stan Bingham (Rep) – Davidson, Guilford
- District 34: Andrew C. Brock (Rep) – Davie, Rowan, Yadkin
- District 35: W. Edward Goodall (Rep) – Mecklenburg, Union
- District 36: Fletcher L. Hartsell Jr. (Rep) – Cabarrus, Rowan
- District 37: Daniel G. Clodfelter (Dem) – Mecklenburg
- District 38: Charlie Smith Dannelly (Dem) – Mecklenburg
- District 39: Bob Rucho (Rep) – Mecklenburg
- District 40: Malcolm Graham (Dem) – Mecklenburg
- District 41: James Forrester (Rep) – Alexander, Iredell
- District 42: Austin M. Allran (Rep) – Catawba, Gaston, Lincoln
- District 43: David W. Hoyle (Dem) – Gaston
- District 44: Jim Jacumin (Rep) – Burke, Caldwell
- District 45: Steve Goss (Dem) – Alexander, Ashe, Watauga, Wilkes
- District 46: Debbie Clary (Rep) – Cleveland, Rutherford
- District 47: Joe Sam Queen (Dem) – Avery, Haywood, Madison, McDowell, Mitchell, Yancey
- District 48: Tom Apodaca (Rep) – Buncombe, Henderson, Polk
- District 49: Martin Nesbitt (Dem) – Buncombe
- District 50: John J. Snow Jr. (Dem) – Cherokee, Clay, Graham, Haywood, Jackson, Macon, Swain, Transylvania

== See also ==
- List of North Carolina state legislatures
