= North Carolina General Assembly of 2007–08 =

Legislative term in US state of North Carolina

148th North Carolina General Assembly 2007–08
←	2005–06	2009–10	→
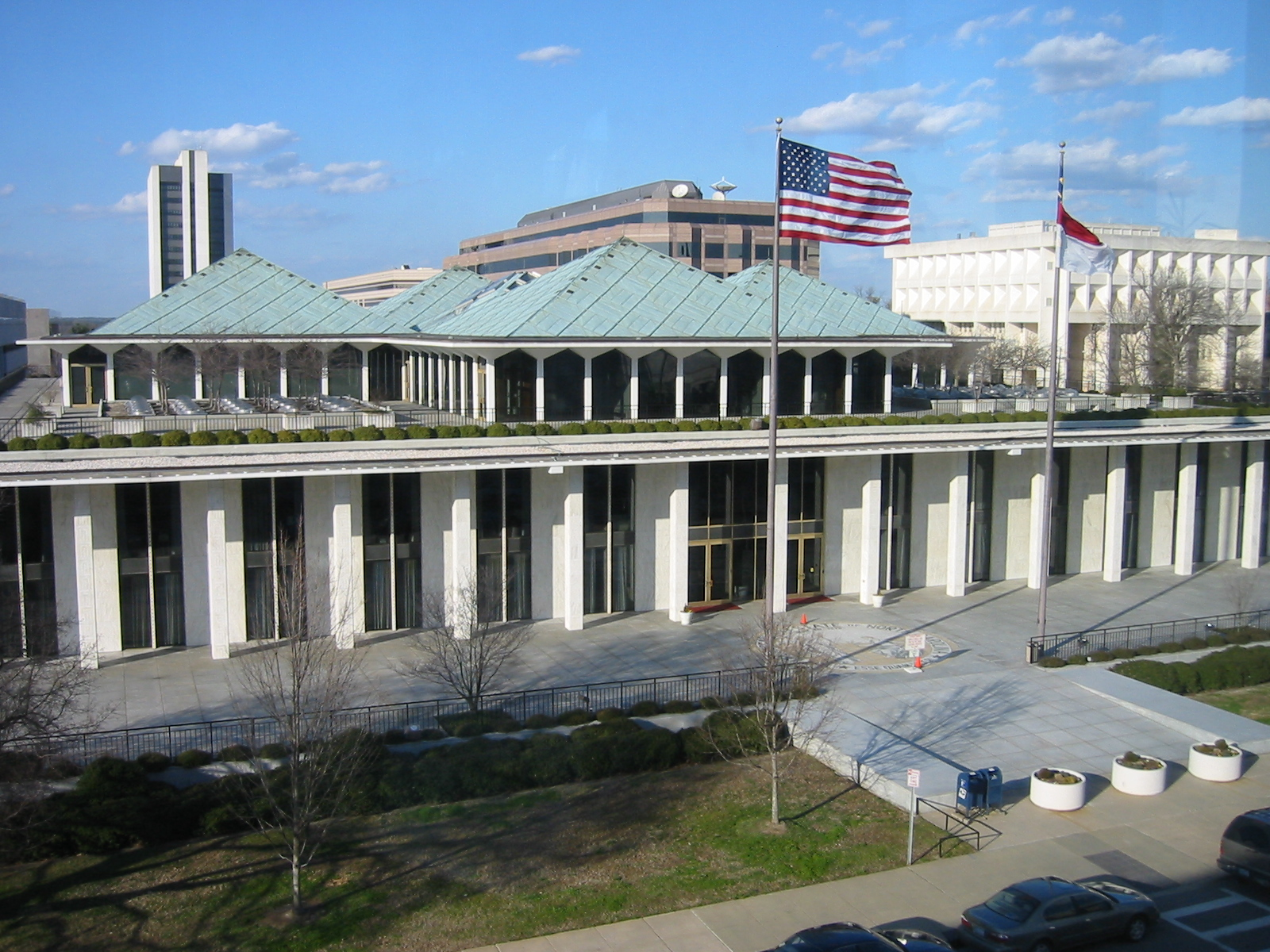
- North Carolina Legislative Building

Overview
- Legislative body: North Carolina General Assembly
- Jurisdiction: North Carolina, United States
- Meeting place: North Carolina State Legislative Building
- Term: 2007–08

North Carolina Senate
- Members: 50 senators
- President pro tempore: Marc Basnight (Dem)
- Majority Leader: Tony Rand (Dem)
- Minority Leader: Phil Berger (Rep)
- Party control: Democratic Party

North Carolina House of Representatives
- Members: 120 representatives
- Speaker: Joe Hackney (Dem)
- Majority Leader: L. Hugh Holliman (Dem)
- Minority Leader: Paul Stam (Rep)
- Party control: Democratic Party

The North Carolina General Assembly of 2007–08 consisted of the North Carolina House of Representatives and the North Carolina Senate that met in Raleigh, North Carolina, in 2007 and 2008. Members of the House and Senate were elected on November 7, 2006. This legislature first convened in January 2007. In addition to its regular sessions, the legislature met in special session in March 2008 to consider expelling Representative Thomas E. Wright.

== House of Representatives ==
The North Carolina state House of Representatives, during the 2007–08 session, consisted of 68 Democrats and 52 Republicans.

=== House leaders ===
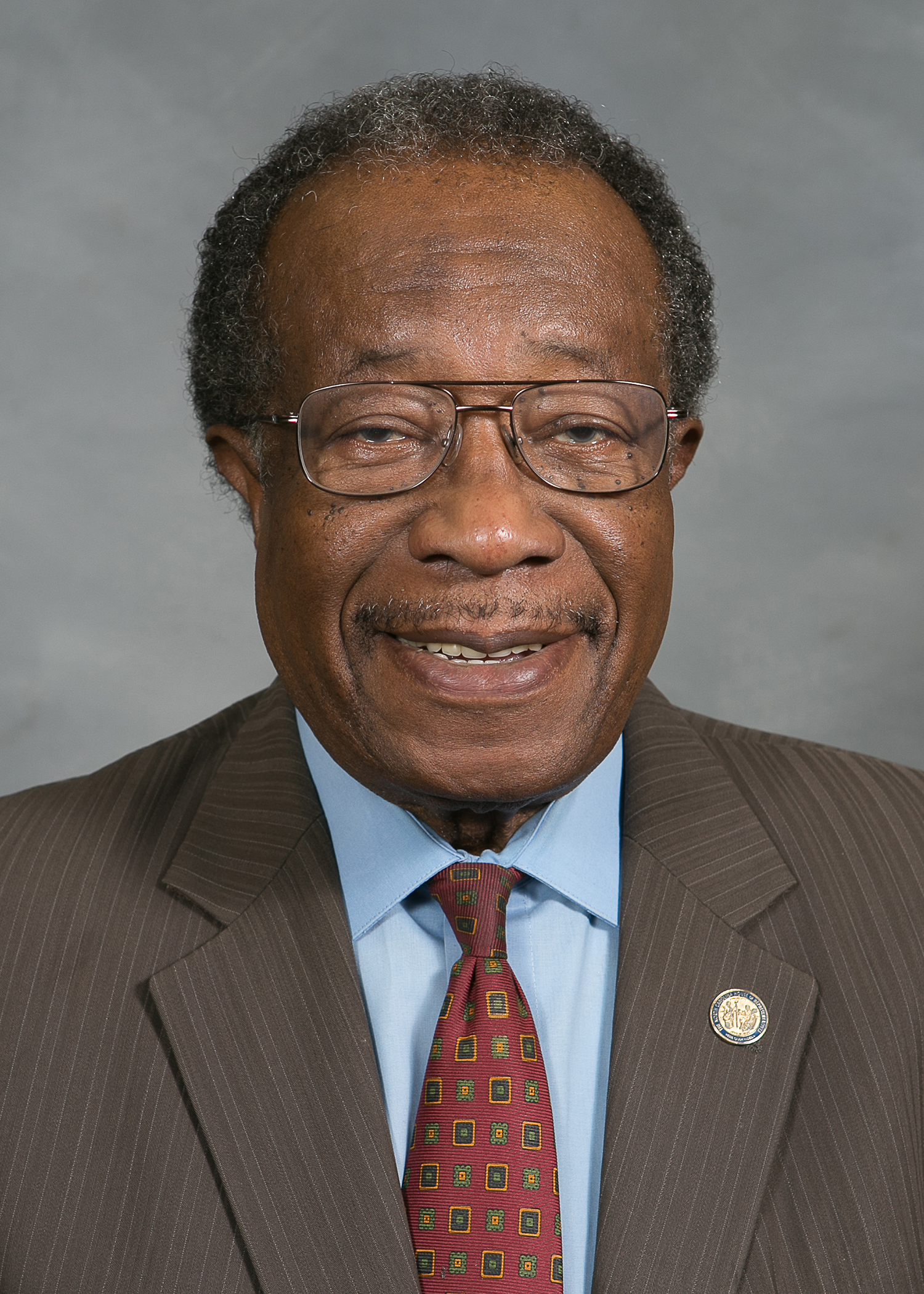
Majority Whip Larry M. Bell

North Carolina House officers
Position	Name	Party
Speaker pro tempore	William L. Wainwright	Democratic
Majority Leader	L. Hugh Holliman	Democratic
Majority Whips	Larry M. Bell	Democratic
Majority Whips	Jean Farmer-Butterfield	Democratic
Majority Whips	Deborah Ross	Democratic
Majority Whips	D. Bruce Goforth	Democratic
Majority Whips	Larry Hall	Democratic
Minority Whip	William C. McGee	Republican
Deputy Minority Whip	Carolyn H. Justice	Republican
Freshman Leaders	Larry Hall	Democratic
Freshman Leaders	Ric Killian	Republican

- Clerk (appointed by the house): Denise Weeks

=== House members ===
- District 1: William C. Owens Jr. (Dem) – Camden, Currituck, Gates, Pasquotank
- District 2: Timothy L. Spear (Dem) – Chowan, Dare, Gates, Perquimans, Tyrrell
- District 3: Alice Graham Underhill (Dem) – Craven, Pamlico
- District 4: Russell E. Tucker (Dem) – Craven, Martin, Pitt
- District 5: Howard J. Hunter Jr. (Dem), died, replaced by Annie Mobley (Dem) – Bertie, Hertford, Northampton
- District 6: Arthur J. Williams (Dem) – Beaufort, Hyde, Washington
- District 7: Edward Jones (Dem), appointed to Senate, replaced by Angela Bryant (Dem) – Halifax, Nash
- District 8: Edith D. Warren (Dem) – Greene, Martin, Pitt
- District 9: Marian N. McLawhorn (Dem) – Pitt
- District 10: Van Braxton (Dem) – Duplin, Lenoir
- District 11: Louis M. Pate Jr. (Rep) – Wayne
- District 12: William L. Wainwright (Dem) – Craven, Jones, Lenoir
- District 13: Pat McElraft (Rep) – Carteret, Onslow
- District 14: George G. Cleveland (Rep) – Onslow
- District 15: W. Robert Grady (Rep) – Onslow
- District 16: Carolyn H. Justice (Rep) – New Hanover, Pender
- District 17: Bonner L. Stiller (Rep) – Brunswick, New Hanover
- District 18: Thomas E. Wright (Dem), expelled on March 20, 2008, replaced by Sandra Spaulding Hughes (Dem) – Brunswick, Columbus, New Hanover
- District 19: Daniel F. McComas (Rep) – New Hanover
- District 20: Dewey L. Hill (Dem) – Brunswick, Columbus
- District 21: Larry M. Bell (Dem) – Duplin, Sampson, Wayne
- District 22: William Brisson (Dem) – Bladen, Sampson
- District 23: Joe P. Tolson (Dem) – Edgecombe, Wilson
- District 24: Jean Farmer-Butterfield (Dem) – Edgecombe, Wilson
- District 25: William G. Daughtridge Jr. (Rep) – Nash
- District 26: N. Leo Daughtry (Rep) – Johnston, Wayne
- District 27: Michael H. Wray (Dem) – Granville, Vance, Warren
- District 28: James Langdon Jr. (Rep) – Johnston
- District 29: Larry Hall (Dem) – Durham
- District 30: Paul Luebke (Dem) – Durham
- District 31: Mickey Michaux (Dem) – Durham
- District 32: James W. Crawford Jr. (Dem) – Durham, Granville, Vance
- District 33: Dan Blue (Dem) – Wake
- District 34: Grier Martin (Dem) – Wake
- District 35: Jennifer Weiss (Dem) – Wake
- District 36: Nelson Dollar (Rep) – Wake
- District 37: Paul Stam (Rep) – Wake
- District 38: Deborah Ross (Dem) – Wake
- District 39: Linda Coleman (Dem) – Wake
- District 40: Marilyn Avila (Rep) – Wake
- District 41: Ty Harrell (Dem) – Wake
- District 42: Marvin W. Lucas (Dem) – Cumberland,
- District 43: Mary E. McAllister (Dem) – Cumberland
- District 44: Margaret H. Dickson (Dem) – Cumberland
- District 45: Rick Glazier (Dem) – Cumberland
- District 46: Douglas Y. Yongue (Dem) – Hoke, Robeson, Scotland
- District 47: Ronnie N. Sutton (Dem) – Hoke, Robeson
- District 48: Garland E. Pierce (Dem) – Hoke, Robeson, Scotland
- District 49: Lucy T. Allen (Dem) – Franklin, Halifax, Nash
- District 50: Bill Faison (Dem) – Caswell', Orange
- District 51: Jimmy L. Love Sr. (Dem) – Harnett, Lee
- District 52: Joe Boylan (Rep) – Moore
- District 53: David R. Lewis (Rep) – Harnett
- District 54: Joe Hackney (Dem) – Chatham, Orange, Moore
- District 55: Winkie Wilkins (Dem) – Durham, Person
- District 56: Verla C. Insko (Dem) – Orange
- District 57: Pricey Harrison (Dem) – Guilford
- District 58: Alma S. Adams (Dem) – Guilford
- District 59: Maggie Jeffus (Dem) – Guilford
- District 60: Earl Jones (Dem) – Guilford
- District 61: Laura I. Wiley (Rep) – Guilford
- District 62: John M. Blust (Rep) – Guilford
- District 63: Alice L. Bordsen (Dem) – Alamance
- District 64: Cary D. Allred (Rep) – Alamance
- District 65: E. Nelson Cole (Dem) – Rockingham
- District 66: Melanie Wade Goodwin (Dem) – Montgomery, Richmond
- District 67: David Almond (Rep), resigned July 12, 2007, replaced by Kenny Furr (Rep) – Montgomery, Stanly, Union
- District 68: J. Curtis Blackwood Jr. (Rep) – Union
- District 69: Pryor A. Gibson III (Dem) – Anson, Montgomery, Union
- District 70: Pat B. Hurley (Rep) – Randolph
- District 71: Larry W. Womble (Dem) – Forsyth
- District 72: Earline W. Parmon (Dem) – Forsyth
- District 73: Larry R. Brown (Rep) – Forsyth
- District 74: Dale Folwell (Rep) – Forsyth
- District 75: William C. McGee (Rep) – Forsyth
- District 76: Fred F. Steen II (Rep) – Rowan
- District 77: Lorene T. Coates (Dem) – Rowan
- District 78: Harold J. Brubaker (Rep) – Randolph
- District 79: Julia C. Howard (Rep) – Davidson, Davie, Iredell
- District 80: Jerry C. Dockham (Rep) – Davidson
- District 81: L. Hugh Holliman (Dem) – Davidson
- District 82: Jeff Barnhart (Rep) – Cabarrus
- District 83: Linda P. Johnson (Rep) – Cabarrus
- District 84: Phillip D. Frye (Rep) – Avery, Caldwell, Mitchell
- District 85: Mitch Gillespie (Rep) – Burke, Caldwell, McDowell
- District 86: Walter G. Church Sr. (Dem) – Burke
- District 87: Edgar V. Starnes (Rep) – Alexander, Caldwell
- District 88: T. Raymond Warren (Dem) – Alexander, Catawba
- District 89: Mitchell S. Setzer (Rep) – Catawba
- District 90: James A. Harrell III (Dem) – Alleghany, Surry
- District 91: Bryan R. Holloway (Rep) – Stokes, Rockingham
- District 92: George M. Holmes (Rep) – Forsyth, Yadkin
- District 93: Cullie Tarleton (Dem) – Ashe, Watauga
- District 94: R. Tracy Walker (Rep) – Wilkes
- District 95: Karen B. Ray (Rep) – Catawba, Iredell
- District 96: Mark K. Hilton (Rep) – Catawba
- District 97: Joe L. Kiser (Rep) – Lincoln
- District 98: Thom Tillis (Rep) – Mecklenburg
- District 99: Drew P. Saunders (Dem) – Mecklenburg
- District 100: James B. Black (Dem); resigned, replaced by Tricia Cotham (Dem) – Mecklenburg
- District 101: Beverly M. Earle (Dem) – Mecklenburg
- District 102: Becky Carney (Dem) – Mecklenburg
- District 103: Jim Gulley (Rep) – Mecklenburg
- District 104: Ruth Samuelson (Rep) – Mecklenburg
- District 105: Ric Killian (Rep) – Mecklenburg
- District 106: Martha B. Alexander (Dem) – Mecklenburg
- District 107: W. Pete Cunningham (Dem), resigned December 31, 2007, replaced by Kelly Alexander (Dem) – Mecklenburg
- District 108: Wil Neumann (Rep) – Gaston
- District 109: William A. Current (Rep) – Gaston
- District 110: Debbie Clary (Rep) – Cleveland, Gaston
- District 111: Tim Moore (Rep) – Cleveland
- District 112: Bobby F. England (Dem) – Cleveland, Rutherford
- District 113: Trudi Walend (Rep) – Henderson, Polk, Transylvania
- District 114: Susan C. Fisher (Dem) – Buncombe
- District 115: D. Bruce Goforth (Dem) – Buncombe
- District 116: Charles C. Thomas (Rep) – Buncombe
- District 117: Carolyn K. Justus (Rep) – Henderson, Transylvania
- District 118: Ray Rapp (Dem) – Haywood, Madison, Yancey
- District 119: R. Phillip Haire (Dem) – Haywood, Jackson, Macon, Swain
- District 120: Roger West (Rep) – Cherokee, Clay, Graham, Macon

== Senate ==
The North Carolina state Senate, during the 2007–08 session, consisted of 31 Democrats and 19 Republicans.

=== Senate leaders ===
North Carolina Senate officers
Position	Name	Party
President Pro Tem	Marc Basnight	Democratic
Deputy President Pro Tempore	Charlie Smith Dannelly	Democratic
Majority Leader	Tony Rand	Democratic
Majority Whip	Katie G. Dorsett	Democratic
Deputy Minority Leader	Tom Apodaca	Republican
Minority Whip	Jerry W. Tillman	Republican

- Clerk (appointed by the Senate): Janet Pruitt
- Permanent Democratic Caucus Chair: R. C. Soles Jr. (8th district)
- Democratic Caucus Secretary: Charles W. Albertson (10th district)
- Chairman, Republican Policy Committee: Jean Preston (2nd district)

=== Senate members ===
- District 1: Marc Basnight (Dem) – Beaufort, Camden, Currituck, Dare, Hyde, Pasquotank, Tyrrell, Washington
- District 2: Jean R. Preston (Rep) – Carteret, Craven, Pamlico
- District 3: Clark Jenkins (Dem) – Edgecombe, Martin, Pitt
- District 4: Robert Lee Holloman (Dem), died, replaced by Edward Jones (Dem) – Gates, Halifax, Hertford, Northampton, Bertie, Chowan, Perquimans
- District 5: John H. Kerr III (Dem) – Greene, Pitt, Wayne
- District 6: Harry Brown (Rep) – Jones, Onslow
- District 7: Doug Berger (Dem) – Franklin, Granville, Vance, Warren
- District 8: R. C. Soles Jr. (Dem) – Brunswick, Columbus, Pender
- District 9: Julia Boseman (Dem) – New Hanover
- District 10: Charles W. Albertson (Dem) – Duplin, Harnett, Sampson
- District 11: A. B. Swindell (Dem) – Franklin, Nash, Vance
- District 12: Fred Smith (Rep) – Johnston, Wayne
- District 13: David F. Weinstein (Dem) – Hoke, Robeson
- District 14: Vernon Malone (Dem) – Wake
- District 15: Neal Hunt (Rep) – Wake
- District 16: Janet Cowell (Dem) – Wake
- District 17: Richard Y. Stevens (Rep) – Wake
- District 18: Bob Atwater (Dem) – Durham, Chatham, Lee
- District 19: Tony Rand (Dem) – Bladen, Cumberland
- District 20: Jeanne Hopkins Lucas (Dem), died March 9, 2007, replaced by Floyd McKissick Jr. (Dem) – Durham
- District 21: Larry Shaw (Dem) – Cumberland
- District 22: Harris Blake (Rep) – Harnett, Lee, Moore
- District 23: Eleanor Kinnaird (Dem) – Chatham, Orange, Person
- District 24: Anthony Foriest (Dem) – Alamance, Caswell
- District 25: William R. Purcell (Dem) – Anson, Richmond, Scotland, Stanly
- District 26: Phil Berger (Rep) – Guilford, Rockingham
- District 27: Kay Hagan (Dem) – Guilford
- District 28: Katie G. Dorsett (Dem) – Guilford
- District 29: Jerry W. Tillman (Rep) – Montgomery, Randolph
- District 30: Donald East (Rep) – Stokes, Surry, Yadkin
- District 31: Peter Brunstetter (Rep) – Forsyth
- District 32: Linda Garrou (Dem) – Forsyth
- District 33: Stan Bingham (Rep) – Davidson, Guilford
- District 34: Andrew C. Brock (Rep) – Davie, Rowan, Yadkin
- District 35: W. Edward Goodall (Rep) – Mecklenburg, Union
- District 36: Fletcher L. Hartsell Jr. (Rep) – Cabarrus, Rowan
- District 37: Daniel G. Clodfelter (Dem) – Mecklenburg
- District 38: Charlie Smith Dannelly (Dem) – Mecklenburg
- District 39: Robert Pittenger (Rep), resigned, replaced by Bob Rucho (Rep) – Mecklenburg
- District 40: Malcolm Graham (Dem) – Mecklenburg
- District 41: James Forrester (Rep) – Alexander, Iredell
- District 42: Austin M. Allran (Rep) – Catawba, Gaston, Lincoln
- District 43: David W. Hoyle (Dem) – Gaston
- District 44: Jim Jacumin (Rep) – Burke, Caldwell
- District 45: Steve Goss (Dem) – Alexander, Ashe, Watauga, Wilkes
- District 46: Walter Dalton (Dem) – Cleveland, Rutherford
- District 47: Joe Sam Queen (Dem) – Avery, Haywood, Madison, McDowell, Mitchell, Yancey
- District 48: Tom Apodaca (Rep) – Buncombe, Henderson, Polk
- District 49: Martin Nesbitt (Dem) – Buncombe
- District 50: John J. Snow Jr. (Dem) – Cherokee, Clay, Graham, Haywood, Jackson, Macon, Swain, Transylvania

== See also ==
- List of North Carolina state legislatures
