= 2000 North Carolina judicial elections =

The North Carolina judicial elections of 2000 were held on 7 November 2000, to elect judges to the North Carolina Supreme Court and North Carolina Court of Appeals.

== Supreme Court ==
=== Chief Justice ===
2000 North Carolina Supreme Court election – Chief Justice
Party	Candidate	Votes	%
Republican	I. Beverly Lake Jr.	1,453,039	51.36%
Democratic	Henry Frye (incumbent)	1,375,820	48.64%
Total votes		2,828,859	100%
Republican gain from Democratic			

=== Freeman seat ===
2000 North Carolina Supreme Court election – Freeman seat
Party	Candidate	Votes	%
Republican	Robert Edmunds Jr.	1,436,510	51.95%
Democratic	Franklin Freeman (incumbent)	1,328,623	48.05%
Total votes		2,765,133	100%
Republican gain from Democratic			

== Court of Appeals ==
=== Horton seat ===
2000 North Carolina Court of Appeals election – Horton seat
Party	Candidate	Votes	%
Republican	Douglas McCullough	1,371,798	50.32%
Democratic	Clarence Horton Jr. (incumbent)	1,354,543	49.68%
Total votes		2,726,341	100%
Republican gain from Democratic			

=== John seat ===
2000 North Carolina Court of Appeals election – John seat
Party	Candidate	Votes	%
Republican	John Tyson	1,364,239	50.07%
Democratic	Jim Fuller	1,360,309	49.93%
Total votes		2,724,548	100%
Republican gain from Democratic			

=== Lewis seat ===
2000 North Carolina Court of Appeals election – Lewis seat
Party	Candidate	Votes	%
Democratic	Robin Hudson	1,396,957	51.46%
Republican	Paul Stam	1,317,677	48.54%
Total votes		2,714,634	100%
Democratic hold			

=== Martin seat ===
2000 North Carolina Court of Appeals election – Martin seat
Party	Candidate	Votes	%
Democratic	John Martin (incumbent)	1,375,920	50.63%
Republican	Wendy Enochs	1,341,854	49.37%
Total votes		2,717,774	200%
Democratic hold			

=== Wynn seat ===
2000 North Carolina Court of Appeals election – Wynn seat
Party	Candidate	Votes	%
Democratic	James Andrew Wynn (incumbent)	1,390,169	51.49%
Republican	Wendell Schollander	1,309,655	48.51%
Total votes		2,699,824	100%
Democratic hold			
