= North Carolina's 21st House district =

American legislative district

North Carolina's 21st State House of Representatives district
Representative
Ya Liu; D–Cary
- Demographics: 52% White; 8% Black; 7% Hispanic; 28% Asian; 1% Other; 5% Multiracial
- Population (2024): 94,832

North Carolina's 21st House district is one of 120 districts in the North Carolina House of Representatives. It has been represented by Democrat Ya Liu since 2023.

== Geography ==
Since 2023, the district has included part of Wake County. The district overlaps with the 13th and 17th Senate districts.

== District officeholders ==
=== Multi-member district ===
Representative	Party	Dates	Notes	Representative	Party	Dates	Notes	Representative	Party	Dates	Notes	Representative	Party	Dates	Notes	Representative	Party	Dates	Notes	Representative	Party	Dates	Notes	Counties
District created January 1, 1967.
Jack Euliss (Burlington)	Democratic	January 1, 1967 – January 1, 1971	Redistricted from the Alamance County district.	M. Glenn Pickard (Burlington)	Democratic	January 1, 1967 – January 1, 1969	Redistricted from the Alamance County district.																	1967–1973; All of Alamance County.
Jack Euliss (Burlington)	Democratic	January 1, 1967 – January 1, 1971	Redistricted from the Alamance County district.	W. S. "Sandy" Harris Jr. (Graham)	Democratic	January 1, 1969 – January 1, 1973	Redistricted to the 22nd district.																	1967–1973; All of Alamance County.
James Long (Burlington)	Democratic	January 1, 1971 – January 1, 1973	Redistricted to the 22nd district.	W. S. "Sandy" Harris Jr. (Graham)	Democratic	January 1, 1969 – January 1, 1973	Redistricted to the 22nd district.																	1967–1973; All of Alamance County.
Joy Johnson (Fairmont)	Democratic	January 1, 1973 – February 10, 1978	Redistricted from the 24th district. Resigned.	Gus Speros (Maxton)	Democratic	January 1, 1973 – January 1, 1975	Redistricted from the 24th district.	Frank White (Pembroke)	Democratic	January 1, 1973 – January 1, 1975														1973–1983; All of Robeson, Hoke, and Scotland counties.
Joy Johnson (Fairmont)	Democratic	January 1, 1973 – February 10, 1978	Redistricted from the 24th district. Resigned.	David Parnell (Parkton)	Democratic	January 1, 1975 – January 1, 1983	Redistricted to the 16th district and retired to run for State Senate.	Henry Ward Oxendine (Pembroke)	Democratic	January 1, 1975 – January 1, 1977														1973–1983; All of Robeson, Hoke, and Scotland counties.
Joy Johnson (Fairmont)	Democratic	January 1, 1973 – February 10, 1978	Redistricted from the 24th district. Resigned.	David Parnell (Parkton)	Democratic	January 1, 1975 – January 1, 1983	Redistricted to the 16th district and retired to run for State Senate.	Horace Locklear (Lumberton)	Democratic	January 1, 1977 – January 1, 1983														1973–1983; All of Robeson, Hoke, and Scotland counties.
Vacant		February 10, 1978 – February 22, 1978		David Parnell (Parkton)	Democratic	January 1, 1975 – January 1, 1983	Redistricted to the 16th district and retired to run for State Senate.	Horace Locklear (Lumberton)	Democratic	January 1, 1977 – January 1, 1983														1973–1983; All of Robeson, Hoke, and Scotland counties.
Robert Davis (Maxton)	Democratic	February 22, 1978 – January 1, 1981	Appointed to finish Johnson's term.	David Parnell (Parkton)	Democratic	January 1, 1975 – January 1, 1983	Redistricted to the 16th district and retired to run for State Senate.	Horace Locklear (Lumberton)	Democratic	January 1, 1977 – January 1, 1983														1973–1983; All of Robeson, Hoke, and Scotland counties.
William Gay (Lumberton)	Democratic	January 1, 1981 – January 1, 1983		David Parnell (Parkton)	Democratic	January 1, 1975 – January 1, 1983	Redistricted to the 16th district and retired to run for State Senate.	Horace Locklear (Lumberton)	Democratic	January 1, 1977 – January 1, 1983														1973–1983; All of Robeson, Hoke, and Scotland counties.
Aaron Fussell (Raleigh)	Democratic	January 1, 1983 – January 1, 1985	Redistricted from the 15th district. Redistricted to the 65th district.	Dan Blue (Raleigh)	Democratic	January 1, 1983 – January 1, 1985	Redistricted from the 15th district. Redistricted to the single-member district.	Margaret Ann Stamey (Raleigh)	Democratic	January 1, 1983 – January 1, 1985	Redistricted to the 63rd district.	Allen Adams (Raleigh)	Democratic	January 1, 1983 – January 1, 1985	Redistricted from the 15th district.	Marvin Musselwhite Jr. (Raleigh)	Democratic	January 1, 1983 – January 1, 1985	Redistricted from the 15th district.	Ruth Cook (Raleigh)	Democratic	January 1, 1983 – January 1, 1985	Redistricted from the 15th district.	1983–1985; All of Wake County.

=== Single-member district ===
Representative	Party	Dates	Notes	Counties
Dan Blue (Raleigh)	Democratic	January 1, 1985 – January 1, 2003	Redistricted from the multi-member district. Redistricted to the 33rd district and retired to run for U.S. Senator.	1985–2003; Parts of Wake County.
Larry Bell (Clinton)	Democratic	January 1, 2003 – January 1, 2019	Redistricted from the 97th district. Retired.	2003–2005; Parts of Sampson, Duplin, and Wayne counties.
Larry Bell (Clinton)	Democratic	January 1, 2003 – January 1, 2019	Redistricted from the 97th district. Retired.	2005–2013; Parts of Sampson and Wayne counties.
Larry Bell (Clinton)	Democratic	January 1, 2003 – January 1, 2019	Redistricted from the 97th district. Retired.	2013–2019; Parts of Sampson, Duplin, and Wayne counties.
Raymond Smith Jr. (Goldsboro)	Democratic	January 1, 2019 – January 1, 2023	Redistricted to the 10th district and retired to run for State Senate.	2019–2023; Parts of Sampson and Wayne Counties.
Ya Liu (Cary)	Democratic	January 1, 2023 – Present		2023–Present; Part of Wake County.

== Election results ==
=== 2024 ===
North Carolina House of Representatives 21st district general election, 2024
Party	Candidate	Votes	%
Democratic	Ya Liu (incumbent)	30,580	62.75%
Republican	Mary Miskimon	18,153	37.25%
Total votes		48,733	100%
Democratic hold			

=== 2022 ===
North Carolina House of Representatives 21st district general election, 2022
Party	Candidate	Votes	%
Democratic	Ya Liu	18,857	67.69%
Republican	Gerard Falzon	8,342	29.95%
Libertarian	Joshua Morris	658	2.36%
Total votes		27,857	100%
Democratic win (new seat)			

=== 2020 ===
North Carolina House of Representatives 21st district general election, 2020
Party	Candidate	Votes	%
Democratic	Raymond Smith Jr. (incumbent)	17,632	53.00%
Republican	Brent Heath	15,633	47.00%
Total votes		33,265	100%
Democratic hold			

=== 2018 ===
North Carolina House of Representatives 21st district Democratic primary election, 2018
Party	Candidate	Votes	%
Democratic	Raymond Smith Jr.	1,511	53.17%
Democratic	Eugene Pearsall	1,331	46.83%
Total votes		2,842	100%

North Carolina House of Representatives 21st district general election, 2018
Party	Candidate	Votes	%
Democratic	Raymond Smith Jr.	12,041	52.65%
Republican	Robert E. Freeman	10,829	47.35%
Total votes		22,870	100%
Democratic hold			

=== 2016 ===
North Carolina House of Representatives 97th district Democratic primary election, 2016
Party	Candidate	Votes	%
Democratic	Larry Bell (incumbent)	8,664	85.45%
Democratic	Scotty L. Smith	1,475	14.55%
Total votes		10,139	100%

North Carolina House of Representatives 21st district general election, 2016
Party	Candidate	Votes	%
Democratic	Larry Bell (incumbent)	24,564	100%
Total votes		24,564	100%
Democratic hold			

=== 2014 ===
North Carolina House of Representatives 21st district general election, 2014
Party	Candidate	Votes	%
Democratic	Larry Bell (incumbent)	15,937	100%
Total votes		15,937	100%
Democratic hold			

=== 2012 ===
North Carolina House of Representatives 21st district general election, 2012
Party	Candidate	Votes	%
Democratic	Larry Bell (incumbent)	25,631	100%
Total votes		25,631	100%
Democratic hold			

=== 2010 ===
North Carolina House of Representatives 21st district general election, 2010
Party	Candidate	Votes	%
Democratic	Larry Bell (incumbent)	11,678	65.59%
Republican	DeAnn G. Poirier	6,126	34.41%
Total votes		17,804	100%
Democratic hold			

=== 2008 ===
North Carolina House of Representatives 21st district general election, 2008
Party	Candidate	Votes	%
Democratic	Larry Bell (incumbent)	21,964	100%
Total votes		21,964	100%
Democratic hold			

=== 2006 ===
North Carolina House of Representatives 21st district general election, 2006
Party	Candidate	Votes	%
Democratic	Larry Bell (incumbent)	9,215	100%
Total votes		9,215	100%
Democratic hold			

=== 2004 ===
North Carolina House of Representatives 21st district general election, 2004
Party	Candidate	Votes	%
Democratic	Larry Bell (incumbent)	17,812	100%
Total votes		17,812	100%
Democratic hold			

=== 2002 ===
North Carolina House of Representatives 21st district general election, 2002
Party	Candidate	Votes	%
Democratic	Larry Bell (incumbent)	11,498	100%
Total votes		11,498	100%
Democratic hold			

=== 2000 ===
North Carolina House of Representatives 21st district general election, 2000
Party	Candidate	Votes	%
Democratic	Dan Blue (incumbent)	20,097	91.48%
Libertarian	Jesse Halliday	1,872	8.52%
Total votes		21,969	100%
Democratic hold			
