= Joe L. Kiser =

American politician

Joe Kiser
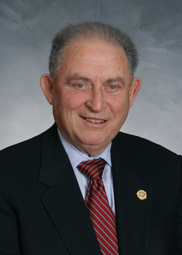

Minority Leader of the North Carolina House of Representatives
- In office January 1, 2003 – January 1, 2007
- Preceded by: Leo Daughtry
- Succeeded by: Paul Stam

Member of the North Carolina House of Representatives
- In office January 1, 1995 – January 1, 2009
- Preceded by: Charles Preston
- Succeeded by: Jonathan Rhyne Jr.
- Constituency: 45th District (1995-2003); 97th District (2003-2009)

Personal details
- Born: Joseph Leonard Kiser; August 20, 1933 (age 92)
- Party: Republican

Joseph Leonard Kiser (born August 20, 1933) is a former Republican member of the North Carolina General Assembly, who represented the State of North Carolina's mountainous ninety-seventh House district, which mostly included Lincoln County. Mr. Kiser served in the State House from the late 1980s until 2009.

Joe Kiser served a term as Sheriff of Lincoln County before being elected to the State legislature. Mr. Kiser served seven terms in the North Carolina State House and is the former House Republican Leader. After 2008, Mr. Kiser did not run for re-election. He was succeeded by Jonathan Rhyne Jr.

Mr. Kiser is retired, and lives in Vale, North Carolina.

== Electoral history ==
=== 2006 ===
North Carolina House of Representatives 97th district general election, 2006
Party	Candidate	Votes	%
Republican	Joe Kiser (incumbent)	12,080	100%
Total votes		12,080	100%
Republican hold			

=== 2004 ===
North Carolina House of Representatives 97th district general election, 2004
Party	Candidate	Votes	%
Republican	Joe Kiser (incumbent)	17,888	61.13%
Democratic	Ken H. Fortenberry	11,374	38.87%
Total votes		29,262	100%
Republican hold			

=== 2002 ===
North Carolina House of Representatives 97th district Republican primary election, 2002
Party	Candidate	Votes	%
Republican	Joe Kiser (incumbent)	4,362	70.30%
Republican	David J. Noles	1,843	29.70%
Total votes		6,205	100%

North Carolina House of Representatives 97th district general election, 2002
Party	Candidate	Votes	%
Republican	Joe Kiser (incumbent)	11,859	58.51%
Democratic	Floyd E. Mason	7,760	38.29%
Libertarian	Bryan Edwards	650	3.21%
Total votes		20,269	100%
Republican hold			

=== 2000 ===
North Carolina House of Representatives 45th district Republican primary election, 2000
Party	Candidate	Votes	%
Republican	Joe Kiser (incumbent)	4,467	41.42%
Republican	Mark Hilton	3,597	33.35%
Republican	Ray Hoyle	2,722	25.24%
Total votes		10,786	100%

North Carolina House of Representatives 45th district general election, 2000
Party	Candidate	Votes	%
Republican	Joe Kiser (incumbent)	30,639	32.75%
Republican	Mark Hilton	29,812	31.87%
Democratic	David Clark Jr.	19,419	20.76%
Democratic	Columbus J. Turner	13,679	14.62%
Total votes		93,549	100%
Republican hold			
Republican hold			

North Carolina House of Representatives
Preceded by Charles Richard Preston	Member of the North Carolina House of Representatives from the 45th district 1995–2003; Served alongside: Cherie Berry, Mark Hilton	Succeeded by Alex Warner
Preceded by Larry Bell	Member of the North Carolina House of Representatives from the 97th district 2003–2009	Succeeded by Jonathan Rhyne Jr.
Political offices
Preceded by Leo Daughtry	Minority Leader of the North Carolina House of Representatives; 2003–2007	Succeeded by Paul Stam
