= Joe Hackney =

American politician

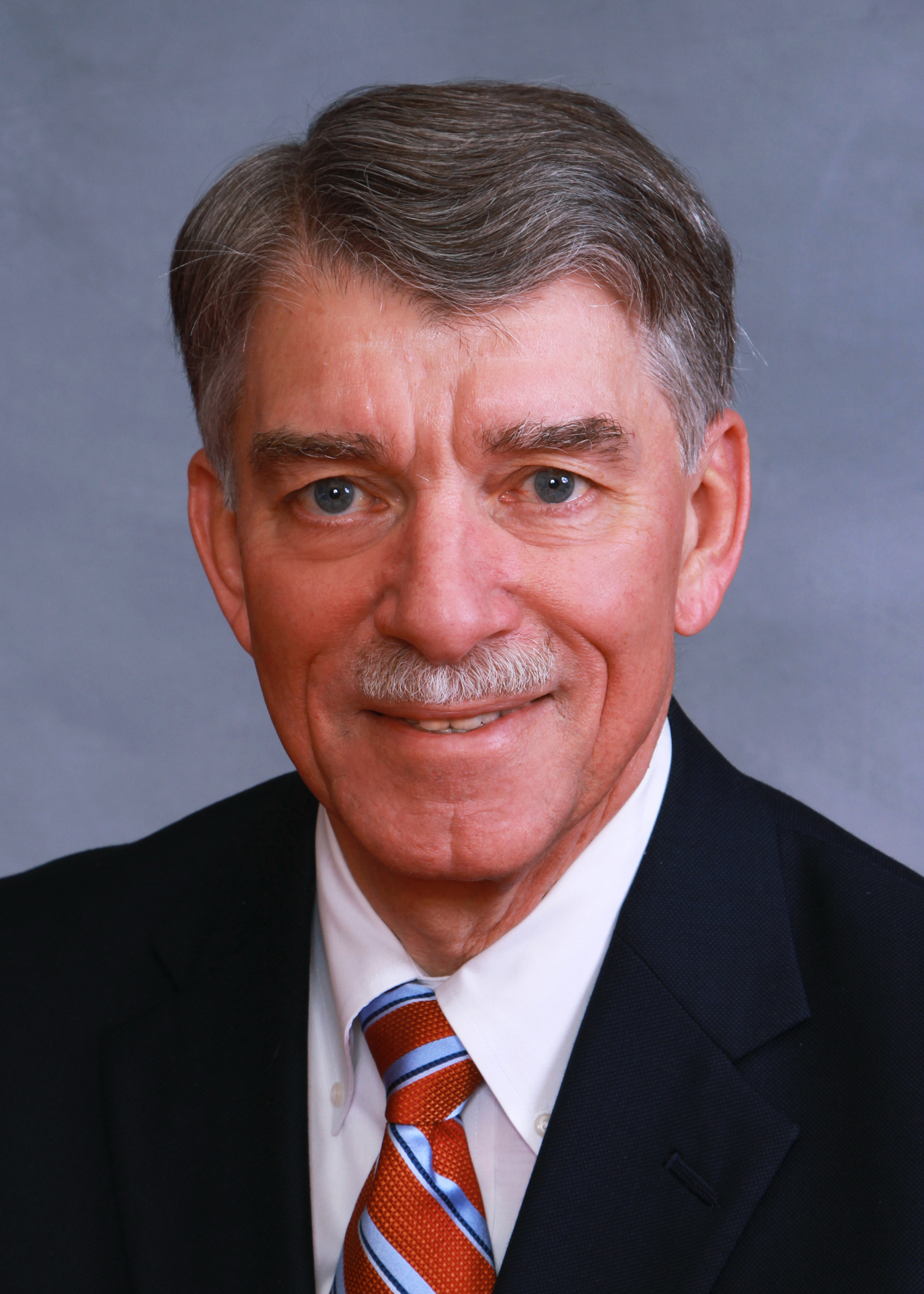

Minority Leader of the North Carolina House of Representatives
- In office January 1, 2011 – January 1, 2013
- Preceded by: Paul Stam
- Succeeded by: Larry Hall

Speaker of the North Carolina House of Representatives
- In office January 1, 2007 – January 1, 2011
- Preceded by: Jim Black
- Succeeded by: Thom Tillis

President of the National Conference of State Legislatures
- In office 2008–2010
- Preceded by: Donna Stone
- Succeeded by: Don Balfour

Member of the North Carolina House of Representatives
- In office January 1, 1981 – January 1, 2013
- Preceded by: Edward Shelton Holmes
- Succeeded by: Deb McManus
- Constituency: 17th District (1981-1983); 24th District (1983-2003); 54th District (2003-2013)

Personal details
- Born: September 23, 1945 (age 81) Silk Hope, North Carolina, U.S.
- Party: Democratic
- Spouse: Betsy Hackney
- Education: University of North Carolina, Chapel Hill (AB, JD)
- Profession: attorney, farmer

Joe Hackney (born September 23, 1945, in Chatham County, North Carolina) served for 16 terms (32 years) as a Democratic member of the North Carolina House of Representatives from the state's fifty-fourth House district, including constituents in Chatham, Orange, and Moore counties. A farmer and attorney from Chapel Hill, Hackney served as Speaker of the House for two terms and thereafter served as House Minority Leader until he chose to retire rather than seek another term in the legislature in 2012.

== Early life ==
Hackney was born on September 23, 1945, in Chatham County, North Carolina. He grew up on a small dairy farm near Silk Hope in Chatham County, where he was the youngest of five children.

Hackney attended North Carolina State University before transferring to the University of North Carolina at Chapel Hill, where he earned bachelor's and Juris Doctor degrees. He worked as a prosecutor from 1971 to 1974 before going into private practice. In 1974, he was campaign manager for Congressman Ike Andrews. While an undergraduate at UNC-Chapel Hill, he wrote his Honors Thesis on the history of the North Carolina corrections system.

== Family ==
He is married to Betsy Strandberg of Rocky Mount, North Carolina; they have two grown children, Dan and Will. Dan lives in Charlottesville, Va., and is employed at Sperry Marine as a software engineer. Will is a musician and a principal in Chapel Hill-Carrboro based Trekky Records, an independent record label.

Hackney is the great-great-grandson of Daniel Hackney, who represented Chatham County in the North Carolina House of Commons in the 1840s and 1850s.

== Career ==
Hackney has been a partner in the Chapel Hill law firm of Epting & Hackney since 1974, currently emphasizing civil litigation and domestic relations.

In addition to practicing law, Hackney operates the family beef cattle farm in Chatham County with his brother, Jack Hackney.

== Legislative highlights ==
He served two terms (four years) as Speaker pro tempore of the state House, and two terms as House Majority Leader (or Democratic leader, when no party had a majority in 2003–2004). On January 10, 2007, Hackney was nominated by the Democratic majority as Speaker of the House. He was elected speaker when the new legislature convened on January 24, with all 68 House Democrats supporting him. Hackney was reelected speaker for a second two-year term in January 2009. He was embroiled in a controversy during his tenure as Speaker when, on July 9, 2010, he relieved pastor Ron Baity of his duties as honorary chaplain of the House over the content of a prayer.

After Democrats lost their House majority in the 2010 elections, Hackney was elected to continue leading his party as Minority Leader. He also became co-chairman of the House Ethics Committee in the 2011–12 session and was the only House Democrat given a committee chairmanship by Speaker Thom Tillis.

Hackney served as President of the National Conference of State Legislatures (NCSL) for a one-year term starting in July 2008. In that role he led an organization made up of all state legislators and staff. NCSL advocates on behalf of states before Congress and the federal administration and provides professional development opportunities for legislative staff. In 2007, the National Conference of State Legislatures awarded Hackney its Excellence in State Legislative Leadership Award.

In February 2012, Hackney announced his intention to retire as House Minority Leader after his term ended.

Hackney has been consistently rated in the top ten for effectiveness (out of 120) by peers in the North Carolina Center for Public Policy Research survey, when the House is in Democratic control. He rated 5th in 1992 survey; 4th in 1994 survey; 4th in 1999 survey; 5th in 2001 survey; 4th in 2003 survey; 3rd in 2005 survey; and 1st in 2007 survey.

He has sponsored many pieces of significant legislation, including the phosphate detergent ban; the Waste Management Act of 1989, which established an aggressive policy on reducing solid waste in North Carolina; the .08 DWI bill, lowering the permissible level of blood alcohol content for drivers; the Taxpayer Bill of Rights, giving additional protections to taxpayers dealing with the N.C. Department of Revenue; domestic relations reform measures, including bills to streamline procedures for equitable distribution, alimony and divorce; in 1995, a new rewrite of alimony laws and DWI laws; in 1997, Governor's DWI reform bill, including vehicle seizure and forfeiture provisions, and three equitable distribution reform bills; in 1999, clean air, clean water, and sedimentation bills, HMO liability, and DWI improvements.

North Carolina House of Representatives
Preceded by Edward Shelton Holmes	Member of the North Carolina House of Representatives from the 17th district 1981–1983	Succeeded by Chancy Rudolph Edwards; Luther Reginald Jeralds
Preceded by Harold Brubaker; William Frank Redding III	Member of the North Carolina House of Representatives from the 24th district 1983–2003	Succeeded by Jean Farmer-Butterfield
Preceded by Drew Saunders	Member of the North Carolina House of Representatives from the 54th district 2003–2013	Succeeded by Deb McManus
Political offices
Preceded by Jim Black	Speaker of the North Carolina House of Representatives; 2007–2011	Succeeded by Thom Tillis
Preceded by Paul Stam	Minority Leader of the North Carolina House of Representatives; 2011–2013	Succeeded by Larry Hall
