= L. Hugh Holliman =

American politician

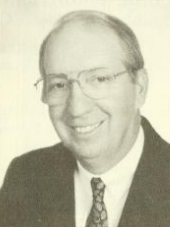
Holliman in the 2001 legislative manual

Lindsey Hugh Holliman is a former Democratic member of the North Carolina General Assembly who represented the state's eighty-first House district, including constituents in Davidson County. A self-employed businessman from Lexington, North Carolina, Holliman served six terms in the state House of Representatives until he was defeated by Republican Rayne Brown in the 2010 general election.

In 2006, Holliman was frequently mentioned as a consensus candidate to replace embattled House Speaker Jim Black. Holliman decided to forgo a run for Speaker, and instead ran for and won the post of House Majority Leader.

Holliman had a daughter, Sue Ellen "Suzi" Holliman, who was murdered in 1985 by an intruder who kidnapped her from their family home. The perpetrator, Ricky Lee Sanderson, was sentenced to death and executed in 1998 for the crime.

North Carolina House of Representatives
Preceded by Paul Reeves McCrary	Member of the North Carolina House of Representatives from the 37th district 2001–2003	Succeeded by Paul Stam
Preceded by Jeff Barnhart	Member of the North Carolina House of Representatives from the 81st district 2003–2011	Succeeded by Rayne Brown
Preceded by Joe Hackney	Majority Leader of the North Carolina House of Representatives; 2007–2011	Succeeded by Paul Stam
