= Carolyn H. Justice =

American politician

Carolyn Justice
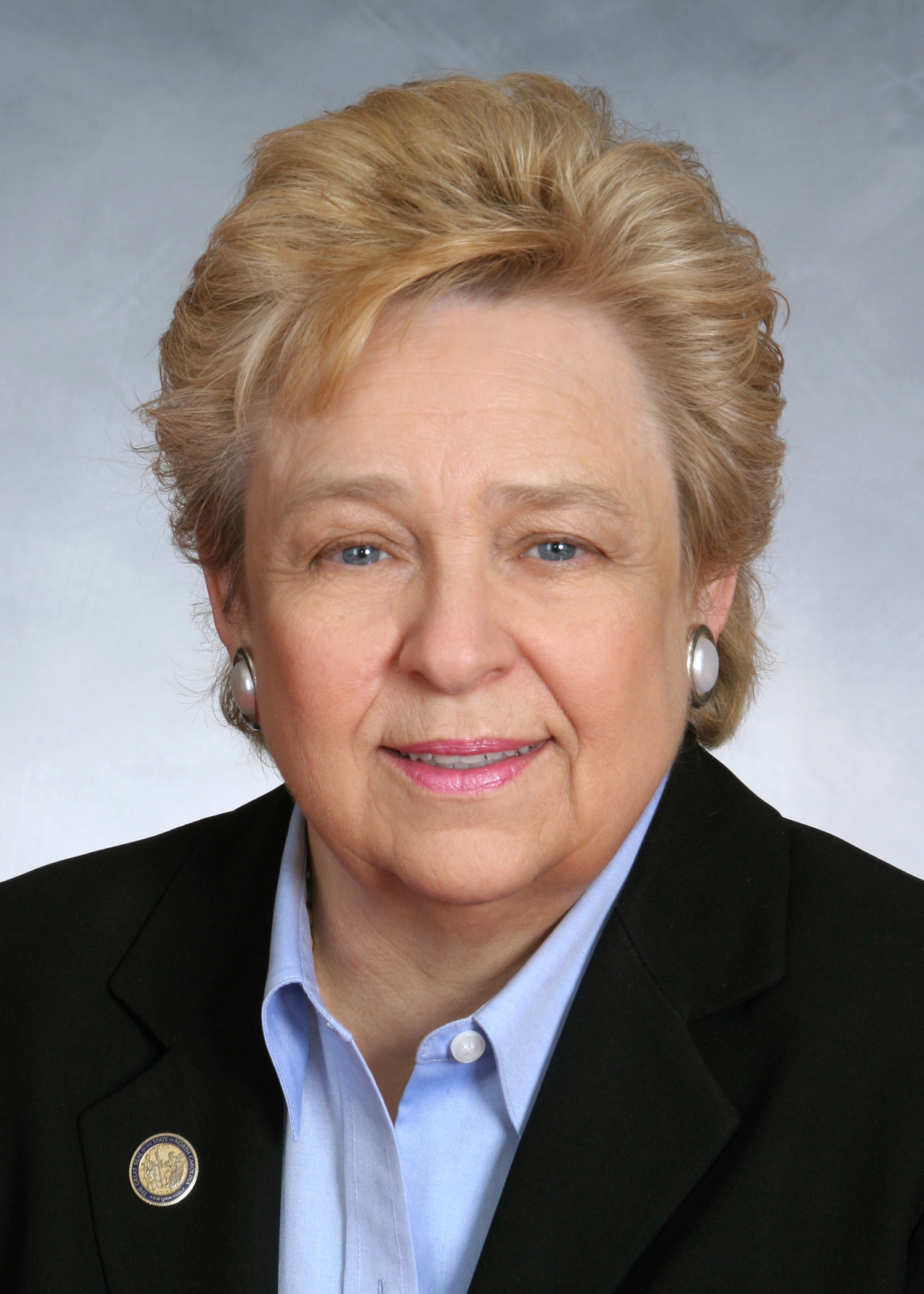

Member of the North Carolina House of Representatives from the 16th district
- In office January 1, 2003 – January 1, 2013
- Preceded by: Constituency established
- Succeeded by: Chris Millis

Personal details
- Born: Carolyn Hewitt; May 13, 1946 (age 80)
- Party: Republican
- Spouse: Bill
- Children: 2
- Occupation: property manager

Carolyn Hewitt Justice is a former Republican member of the North Carolina House of Representatives who represented the 16th district, which includes constituents in New Hanover and Pender counties. A property manager from Hampstead, North Carolina, Justice was first elected in 2002 and served five terms in the State House of Representatives, from 2003 to 2012. She did not run for reelection in 2012, and the seat is currently held by Rep. Chris Millis.

In her final term, Justice was chairman of the Appropriations Subcommittee on Natural and Economic Resources, and the Environment and Natural Resources Committee. She was also a member of the following committees: Appropriations; Election Law and Campaign Finance Reform; Ethics; and Rules, Calendar, and Operations of the House.

In January 2014, she announced her intention to run for the vice-chairmanship of the North Carolina Republican Party. As of 2023, she is the Senior Advisor for the North Carolina Teenage Republicans.

== Committee assignments ==
Source for assignments

=== 2011-2012 session ===
- Appropriations
- Appropriations - Natural and Economic Resources (Chair)
- Commerce and Job Development (Vice Chair)
- Alcoholic Beverage Control
- Elections
- Government

=== 2009-2010 session ===
- Appropriations
- Appropriations - Natural and Economic Resources
- Election Law and Campaign Finance Reform
- Environment and Natural Resources
- Ethics
- Marine Resources and Aquaculture
- Pender/New Hanover Redistricting
- Rules, Calendar, and Operations of the House
- Water Resources and Infrastructure

== Electoral history ==
=== 2010 ===
North Carolina House of Representatives 16th district general election, 2010
Party	Candidate	Votes	%
Republican	Carolyn Justice (incumbent)	21,630	69.89%
Democratic	Franklin (F. D.) Rivenbark	9,320	30.11%
Total votes		30,950	100%
Republican hold			

=== 2008 ===
North Carolina House of Representatives 16th district general election, 2008
Party	Candidate	Votes	%
Republican	Carolyn Justice (incumbent)	33,154	100%
Total votes		33,154	100%
Republican hold			

=== 2006 ===
North Carolina House of Representatives 16th district general election, 2006
Party	Candidate	Votes	%
Republican	Carolyn Justice (incumbent)	14,918	100%
Total votes		14,918	100%
Republican hold			

=== 2004 ===
North Carolina House of Representatives 16th district Republican primary election, 2004
Party	Candidate	Votes	%
Republican	Carolyn Justice (incumbent)	3,326	60.68%
Republican	Rick Catlin	2,155	39.32%
Total votes		5,481	100%

North Carolina House of Representatives 16th district general election, 2004
Party	Candidate	Votes	%
Republican	Carolyn Justice (incumbent)	25,427	100%
Total votes		25,427	100%
Republican hold			

=== 2002 ===
North Carolina House of Representatives 16th district Republican primary election, 2002
Party	Candidate	Votes	%
Republican	Carolyn Justice	2,412	73.65%
Republican	David R. Greene Sr.	863	26.35%
Total votes		3,275	100%

North Carolina House of Representatives 16th district general election, 2002
Party	Candidate	Votes	%
Republican	Carolyn Justice	11,338	55.92%
Democratic	Jack C. Barnes	8,476	41.81%
Libertarian	Robert J. Smith	460	2.27%
Total votes		20,274	100%
Republican win (new seat)			

North Carolina House of Representatives
Preceded by Douglas Yongue	member of the North Carolina House of Representatives from the 16th district 2003-2013	Succeeded by Chris Millis
