= Bonner L. Stiller =

American politician and attorney

Bonner Lee Stiller (born May 10, 1956) is an attorney from Oak Island, North Carolina. He was born in Southport, North Carolina. He was a Republican member of the North Carolina General Assembly representing the state's seventeenth House district, including constituents in Brunswick and New Hanover counties. In 2002, Stiller surprisingly unseated long-serving Representative David Redwine, a 10-term member of the General Assembly and co-chairman of the House Appropriations Committee. Stiller defeated Redwine for a second time to gain re-election to a second term and defeated Democratic Real Estate Commission chairperson Allan Dameron to win a subsequent term. In 2009, while serving his fourth term, Stiller resigned to spend more time with his family and on his law practice. He was replaced by Oak Island resident Frank Iler.

North Carolina House of Representatives
Preceded by Marvin Lucas; Mary McAllister	Member of the North Carolina House of Representatives from the 17th district 2003–2009	Succeeded by Frank Iler
