= Paul Stam =

American politician from North Carolina

Representative Paul "Skip" Stam
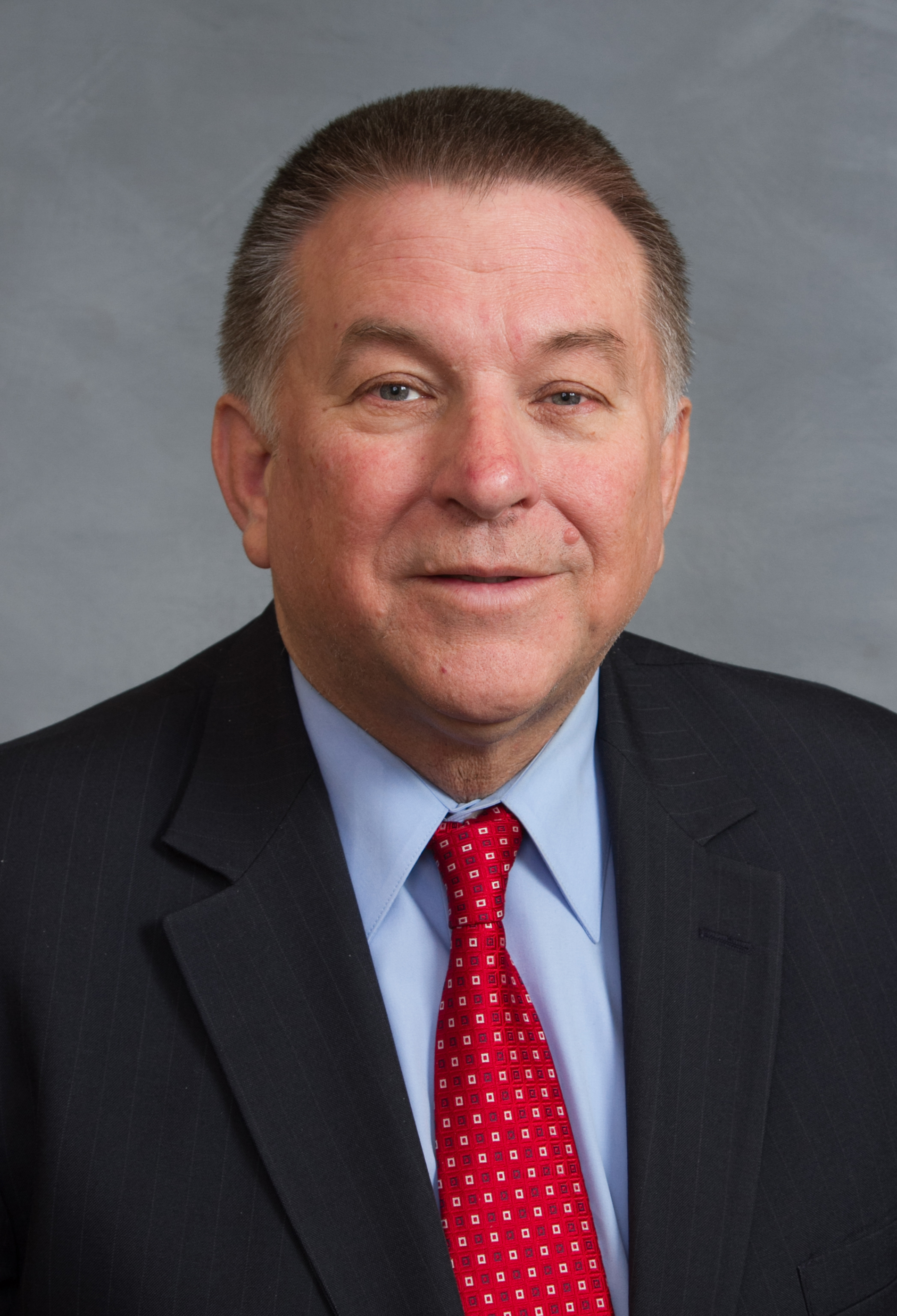

Speaker pro tempore of the North Carolina House of Representatives
- In office January 1, 2013 – January 1, 2017
- Leader: Thom Tillis; Tim Moore
- Preceded by: Dale Folwell
- Succeeded by: Sarah Stevens

Majority Leader of the North Carolina House of Representatives
- In office January 1, 2011 – January 1, 2013
- Leader: Thom Tillis
- Preceded by: Hugh Holliman
- Succeeded by: Edgar Starnes

Minority Leader of the North Carolina House of Representatives
- In office January 1, 2007 – January 1, 2011
- Preceded by: Joe Kiser
- Succeeded by: Joe Hackney

Member of the North Carolina House of Representatives
- In office January 1, 2003 – January 1, 2017
- Preceded by: Constituency established
- Succeeded by: Linda Hunt Williams
- Constituency: 37th District
- In office January 1, 1989 – January 1, 1991
- Preceded by: William M. Freeman
- Succeeded by: Larry M. Jordan
- Constituency: 62nd District

Personal details
- Born: September 5, 1950 (age 76) Princeton, New Jersey, U.S.
- Party: Republican
- Spouse: Dottie
- Children: 2
- Education: Michigan State University (BS); University of North Carolina at Chapel Hill (JD)
- Occupation: Attorney

Paul B. "Skip" Stam Jr. (born September 5, 1950) was a Republican member of the North Carolina General Assembly representing the state's 37th House district, including constituents in Wake County. An attorney from Apex, North Carolina, Stam was elected to his seventh (non-consecutive) term in the state House of Representatives in 2012. He was first elected in 1988, but was defeated for re-election in 1990. He ran unsuccessfully for the state Senate and for the North Carolina Court of Appeals (in 1998 and 2000) before being elected to the House again in 2002.

== Tenure ==
Stam won re-election from the 37th district in the 2004 election, defeating Libertarian H. Wade Minter in the November general election. In 2006, Stam was unsuccessfully challenged by Ed Ridpath (vote count: Stam 15,459 votes, Ridpath 11,628).

In December 2006, Stam and Rep. Fred Steen ran for House Republican Leader after Joe Kiser stepped down from the position. Stam was elected by his fellow House Republicans to the post. After Republicans won a majority in the state House in the 2010 elections, Stam lost a vote to become the party's nominee for Speaker of the House to Representative Thom Tillis, but was elected Majority Leader instead. Following the 2012 elections, Stam was elected Speaker Pro Tempore, taking office in Jan. 2013.

At the close of the 2015 legislative session, Stam announced his intent to retire at the conclusion of the 2016 legislative session. The American Conservative Union gave him a lifetime legislative score of 93%.

=== Controversies ===
In February 2013, Stam drew criticism from news media when he maneuvered the House Rules Committee into giving an "unfavorable report" on a bill to stop arresting medical patients who use marijuana, prohibiting consideration of any similar measure for two years. After spending a total of 20 minutes on the bill, Stam accused constituents of harassing him and other legislators by sending them emails and phone calls encouraging them to vote for the bill. The nonprofit Marijuana Policy Project replied, "Despite what Rep. Stam said, elected officials need to hear from their constituents."

In June 2014, in the course of a debate over a proposal to prohibit charter schools from discriminating in hiring or admissions on the grounds of "sexual orientation or gender identity," Stam passed out a handout describing pedophilia, necrophilia and bestiality as "sexual orientations" (the language was taken from an obsolete edition of the American Psychiatric Association's Diagnostic and Statistical Manual of Mental Disorders). "Many, many sexual orientations are not ones you want to have teaching kids in school. You may think you know what you mean by this, but you don't," Stam said. He refused to further explain the list, which he had previously passed around when arguing against including sexual orientation in the state's statute against school bullying in 2010. Speaker Tillis' office later issued a statement characterizing Stam's remarks as "not helpful".

In March, 2016 Stam co-sponsored Public Facilities Privacy & Security Act, commonly known as House Bill 2.

== Electoral history ==
=== 2014 ===
North Carolina House of Representatives 37th district general election, 2014
Party	Candidate	Votes	%
Republican	Paul Stam (incumbent)	20,972	100%
Total votes		20,972	100%
Republican hold			

=== 2012 ===
North Carolina House of Representatives 37th district general election, 2012
Party	Candidate	Votes	%
Republican	Paul Stam (incumbent)	24,942	57.01%
Democratic	Jason Ora Wunsch	18,809	42.99%
Total votes		43,751	100%
Republican hold			

=== 2010 ===
North Carolina House of Representatives 37th district general election, 2010
Party	Candidate	Votes	%
Republican	Paul Stam (incumbent)	24,937	64.00%
Democratic	Debra McHenry	14,028	36.00%
Total votes		38,965	100%
Republican hold			

=== 2008 ===
North Carolina House of Representatives 37th district general election, 2008
Party	Candidate	Votes	%
Republican	Paul Stam (incumbent)	32,172	53.91%
Democratic	Ed Ridpath	27,503	46.09%
Total votes		59,675	100%
Republican hold			

=== 2006 ===
North Carolina House of Representatives 37th district general election, 2006
Party	Candidate	Votes	%
Republican	Paul Stam (incumbent)	15,459	57.07%
Democratic	Ed Ridpath	11,628	42.93%
Total votes		27,087	100%
Republican hold			

=== 2004 ===
North Carolina House of Representatives 37th district general election, 2004
Party	Candidate	Votes	%
Republican	Paul Stam (incumbent)	29,596	85.39%
Libertarian	H. Wade Minter	5,064	14.61%
Total votes		34,660	100%
Republican hold			

=== 2002 ===
North Carolina House of Representatives 37th district Republican primary election, 2002
Party	Candidate	Votes	%
Republican	Paul Stam	2,457	57.87%
Republican	Kenn Gardner	1,789	42.13%
Total votes		4,246	100%

North Carolina House of Representatives 37th district general election, 2002
Party	Candidate	Votes	%
Republican	Paul Stam	15,647	59.05%
Democratic	J. C. Knowles	9,700	36.61%
Libertarian	Brad Wheeler	1,152	4.35%
Total votes		26,499	100%
Republican win (new seat)			

North Carolina House of Representatives
Preceded by William M. Freeman	Member of the North Carolina House of Representatives from the 62nd district 1989–1991	Succeeded by Larry M. Jordan
Preceded by Hugh Holliman	Member of the North Carolina House of Representatives from the 37th district 2003–2017	Succeeded by Linda Hunt Williams
Preceded by Joe Kiser	Minority Leader of the North Carolina House of Representatives; 2007–2011	Succeeded by Joe Hackney
Preceded by Hugh Holliman	Majority Leader of the North Carolina House of Representatives; 2011–2013	Succeeded by Edgar Starnes
Preceded by Dale Folwell	Speaker pro tempore of the North Carolina House of Representatives; 2013–2017	Succeeded by Sarah Stevens
