= Tony Rand =

American politician (1939–2020)

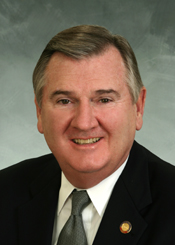

Majority Leader of the North Carolina Senate
- In office January 1, 2001 – November 17, 2009
- Leader: Marc Basnight
- Preceded by: Roy Cooper
- Succeeded by: Martin Nesbitt

Member of the North Carolina Senate
- In office January 1, 1995 – December 31, 2009
- Preceded by: Lura Self Tally
- Succeeded by: Margaret Dickson
- Constituency: 24th District (1995-2003); 19th District (2003-2009)
- In office January 1, 1983 – January 1, 1989 Serving with Lura Self Tally
- Preceded by: Glenn Reginald Jernigan; Joseph Bryant Raynor Jr. (Redistricting)
- Succeeded by: Joseph Bryant Raynor Jr.
- Constituency: 12th District

Personal details
- Born: Anthony Eden Rand; September 1, 1939 Panther Branch, North Carolina, U.S.
- Died: May 1, 2020 (aged 80) Blowing Rock, North Carolina, U.S.
- Party: Democratic
- Spouse: Karen
- Children: 2, including Ripley
- Education: University of North Carolina at Chapel Hill (BA , JD)
- Profession: Attorney

Anthony Eden Rand (September 1, 1939 – May 1, 2020) was an American attorney and politician who served as a member of the North Carolina General Assembly from 1981 to 1989 and again from 1995 to 2009.

== Early life ==
Rand was born in southern Wake County, North Carolina, and graduated from Garner High School in 1957. He earned a bachelor's degree in political science from the University of North Carolina at Chapel Hill in 1961 and a law degree from the University of North Carolina School of Law 1964.

== Career ==
After serving for seven years, Rand left the Assembly to launch an unsuccessful bid for Lieutenant Governor of North Carolina in 1988, losing to Jim Gardner. Rand returned to the state Senate in 1995, where he served until his resignation in 2009. His district included Bladen and Cumberland counties. A lawyer and consultant from Fayetteville, North Carolina, Rand served as Senate Majority Leader from 2001 through 2009. He was succeeded in the leadership post by Martin Nesbitt.

In 2007, Rand proposed in Senate Bill S1557 that the state formally apologize for slavery and the denial of civil rights that followed after slavery.

On May 28, 2008, Rand filed North Carolina Senate Bill 2079 requiring North Carolina college students to mentor public school-age children in order to receive a bachelor's degree. The bill was named for Eve Carson and Abhijit Mahato, two students murdered in North Carolina in 2008.

After leaving the Senate, Rand was appointed to head the state Post-Release Supervision and Parole Commission. He was also chairman of the board of Law Enforcement Associates Corp. Later, he was chairman of the North Carolina Education Lottery Commission.

== Personal life ==
Rand had two children, including attorney Ripley Rand, who served as United States Attorney for the Middle District of North Carolina. Rand died of cancer on May 1, 2020, in Blowing Rock, North Carolina. He was 80.

Party political offices
Preceded by Robert B. Jordan	Democratic nominee for Lieutenant Governor of North Carolina; 1988	Succeeded by Dennis A. Wicker
North Carolina Senate
Preceded by Samuel Rudolph Noble	Member of the North Carolina Senate from the 12th district 1983–1989; Served alongside: Lura Self Tally	Succeeded by Joseph Bryant Raynor Jr.
Preceded by Lura Self Tally	Member of the North Carolina Senate from the 24th district 1995–2003	Succeeded by Hugh Webster
Preceded by Robert G. "Bob" Shaw	Member of the North Carolina Senate from the 19th district 2003–2009	Succeeded by Margaret Dickson
Preceded by Roy Cooper	Majority Leader of the North Carolina Senate; 2001–2009	Succeeded by Martin Nesbitt
