= Larry M. Bell =

American politician from North Carolina

Larry Bell
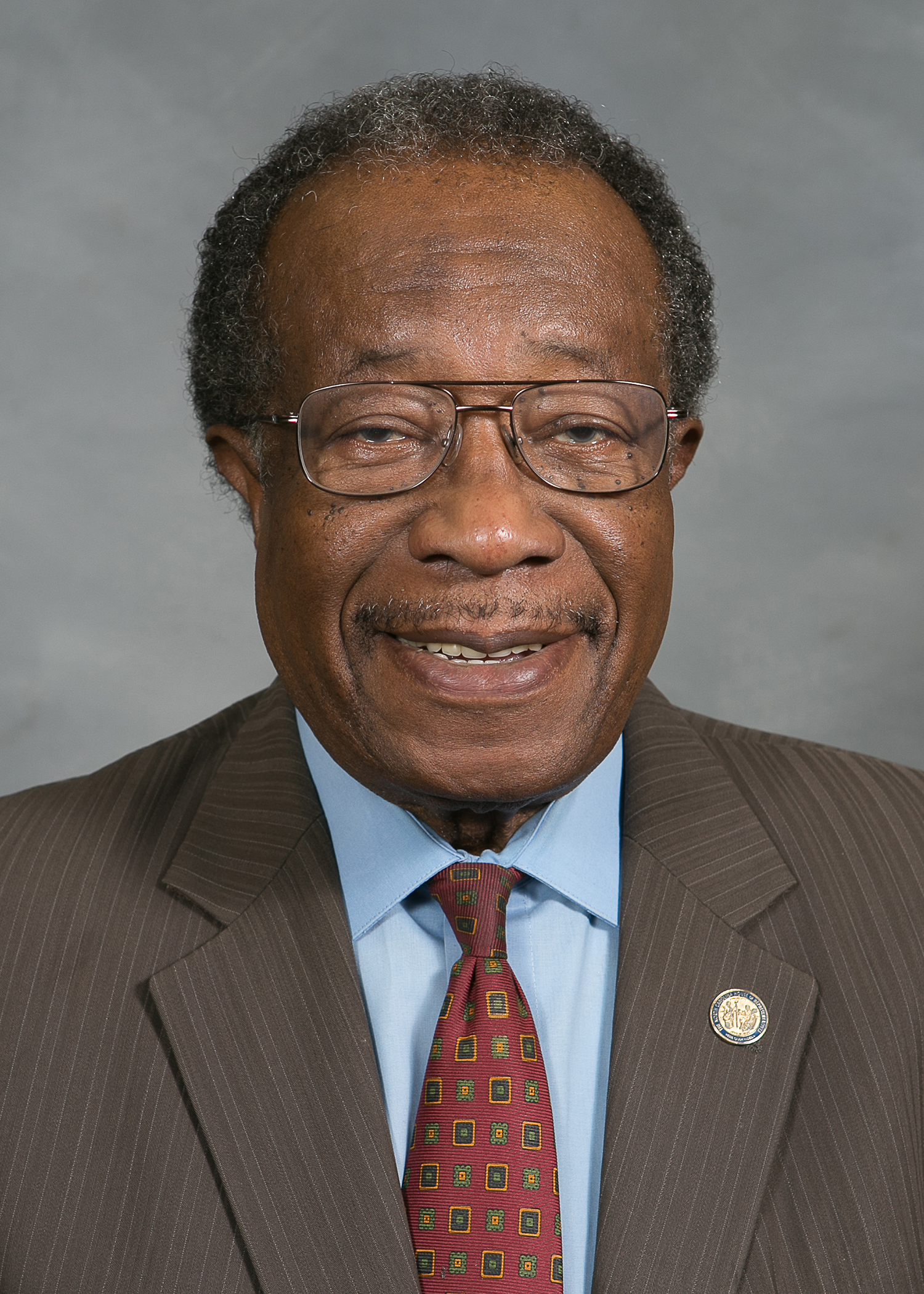

Member of the North Carolina House of Representatives
- In office January 1, 2001 – January 1, 2019
- Preceded by: Jimmie Edward Ford
- Succeeded by: Raymond Smith Jr.
- Constituency: 97th District (2001-2003); 21st District (2003-2019)

Personal details
- Born: Larry Moseley Bell; August 18, 1939 (age 87) Sampson County, North Carolina, U.S.
- Party: Democratic
- Education: East Carolina University, North Carolina Agricultural and Technical State University
- Profession: Educator

Larry Moseley Bell Sr. (born August 18, 1939) is a former Democratic member of the North Carolina General Assembly representing the state's twenty-first House district, including Sampson and Wayne counties. A retired school superintendent from Clinton, North Carolina, Bell started his first term in the State House in 2001. During a portion of his time in the legislature, he served as the majority whip. He did not run for re-election in 2018.

During the 2015 legislative session, Bell was one of 22 African Americans serving in the North Carolina House of Representatives.

During the 2016 legislative session, Bell was one of 11 Democrats to vote in favor of HB2, the controversial "Bathroom Bill."

== Electoral history ==
=== 2016 ===
North Carolina House of Representatives 97th district Democratic primary election, 2016
Party	Candidate	Votes	%
Democratic	Larry Bell (incumbent)	8,664	85.45%
Democratic	Scotty L. Smith	1,475	14.55%
Total votes		10,139	100%

North Carolina House of Representatives 21st district general election, 2016
Party	Candidate	Votes	%
Democratic	Larry Bell (incumbent)	24,564	100%
Total votes		24,564	100%
Democratic hold			

=== 2014 ===
North Carolina House of Representatives 21st district general election, 2014
Party	Candidate	Votes	%
Democratic	Larry Bell (incumbent)	15,937	100%
Total votes		15,937	100%
Democratic hold			

=== 2012 ===
North Carolina House of Representatives 21st district general election, 2012
Party	Candidate	Votes	%
Democratic	Larry Bell (incumbent)	25,631	100%
Total votes		25,631	100%
Democratic hold			

=== 2010 ===
North Carolina House of Representatives 21st district general election, 2010
Party	Candidate	Votes	%
Democratic	Larry Bell (incumbent)	11,678	65.59%
Republican	DeAnn G. Poirier	6,126	34.41%
Total votes		17,804	100%
Democratic hold			

=== 2008 ===
North Carolina House of Representatives 21st district general election, 2008
Party	Candidate	Votes	%
Democratic	Larry Bell (incumbent)	21,964	100%
Total votes		21,964	100%
Democratic hold			

=== 2006 ===
North Carolina House of Representatives 21st district general election, 2006
Party	Candidate	Votes	%
Democratic	Larry Bell (incumbent)	9,215	100%
Total votes		9,215	100%
Democratic hold			

=== 2004 ===
North Carolina House of Representatives 21st district general election, 2004
Party	Candidate	Votes	%
Democratic	Larry Bell (incumbent)	17,812	100%
Total votes		17,812	100%
Democratic hold			

=== 2002 ===
North Carolina House of Representatives 21st district general election, 2002
Party	Candidate	Votes	%
Democratic	Larry Bell (incumbent)	11,498	100%
Total votes		11,498	100%
Democratic hold			

=== 2000 ===
North Carolina House of Representatives 97th district Democratic primary election, 2000
Party	Candidate	Votes	%
Democratic	Larry Bell	2,822	57.33%
Democratic	Jimmie Ford (incumbent)	2,100	42.67%
Total votes		4,922	100%

North Carolina House of Representatives 97th district general election, 2000
Party	Candidate	Votes	%
Democratic	Larry Bell	9,131	72.63%
Republican	John Sherman Best	3,441	27.37%
Total votes		12,572	100%
Democratic hold			

== Committee assignments ==
=== 2017-2018 Session ===
- Appropriations
- Appropriations - Education
- State Personnel (Vice Chair)
- Agriculture
- Ethics
- Homeland Security, Military, and Veterans Affairs
- Pensions and Retirement

=== 2015-2016 Session ===
- Appropriations
- Appropriations - Education
- State Personnel (Vice Chair)
- Agriculture
- Commerce and Job Development
- Pensions and Retirement

=== 2013-2014 Session ===
- Appropriations
- State Personnel (Vice Chair)
- Commerce and Job Development
- Education
- Homeland Security, Military, and Veterans Affairs
- Regulatory Reform

=== 2011-2012 Session ===
- Appropriations
- State Personnel
- Agriculture
- Commerce and Job Development
- Education
- Homeland Security, Military, and Veterans Affairs

=== 2009-2010 Session ===
- Appropriations
- Agriculture
- Alcoholic Beverage Control
- Education
- Ethics
- Pensions and Retirement
- Rules, Calendar, and Operations of the House
- University Board of Governors Nominating

North Carolina House of Representatives
Preceded by Jimmie Edward Ford	Member of the North Carolina House of Representatives from the 97th district 2001–2003	Succeeded by Joe Kiser
Preceded by Dan Blue	Member of the North Carolina House of Representatives from the 21st district 2003–2019	Succeeded by Raymond Smith Jr.
