= 2022 North Carolina House of Representatives election =

Election in North Carolina

- November 8, 2022

All 120 seats in the North Carolina House of Representatives 61 seats needed for a majority
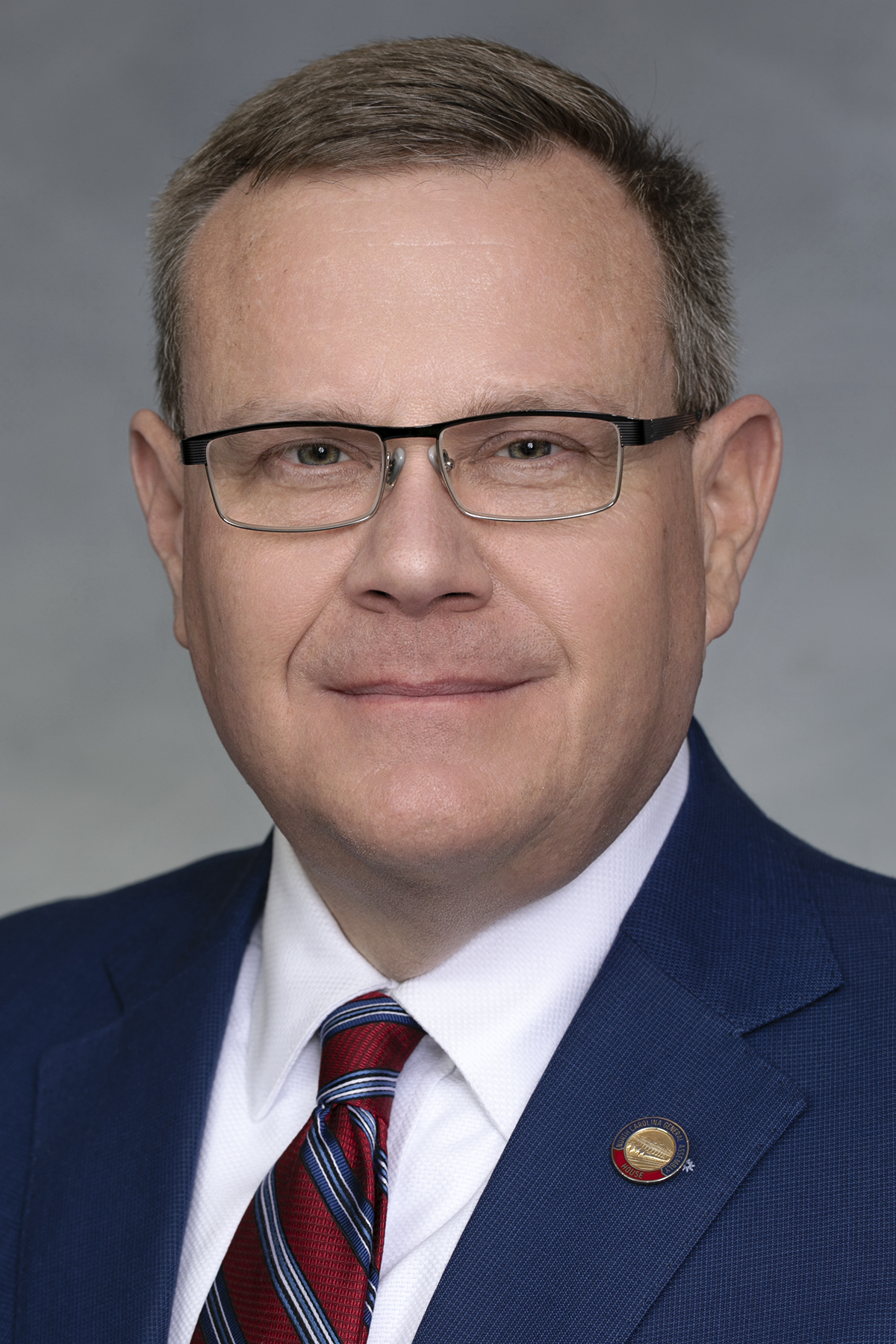

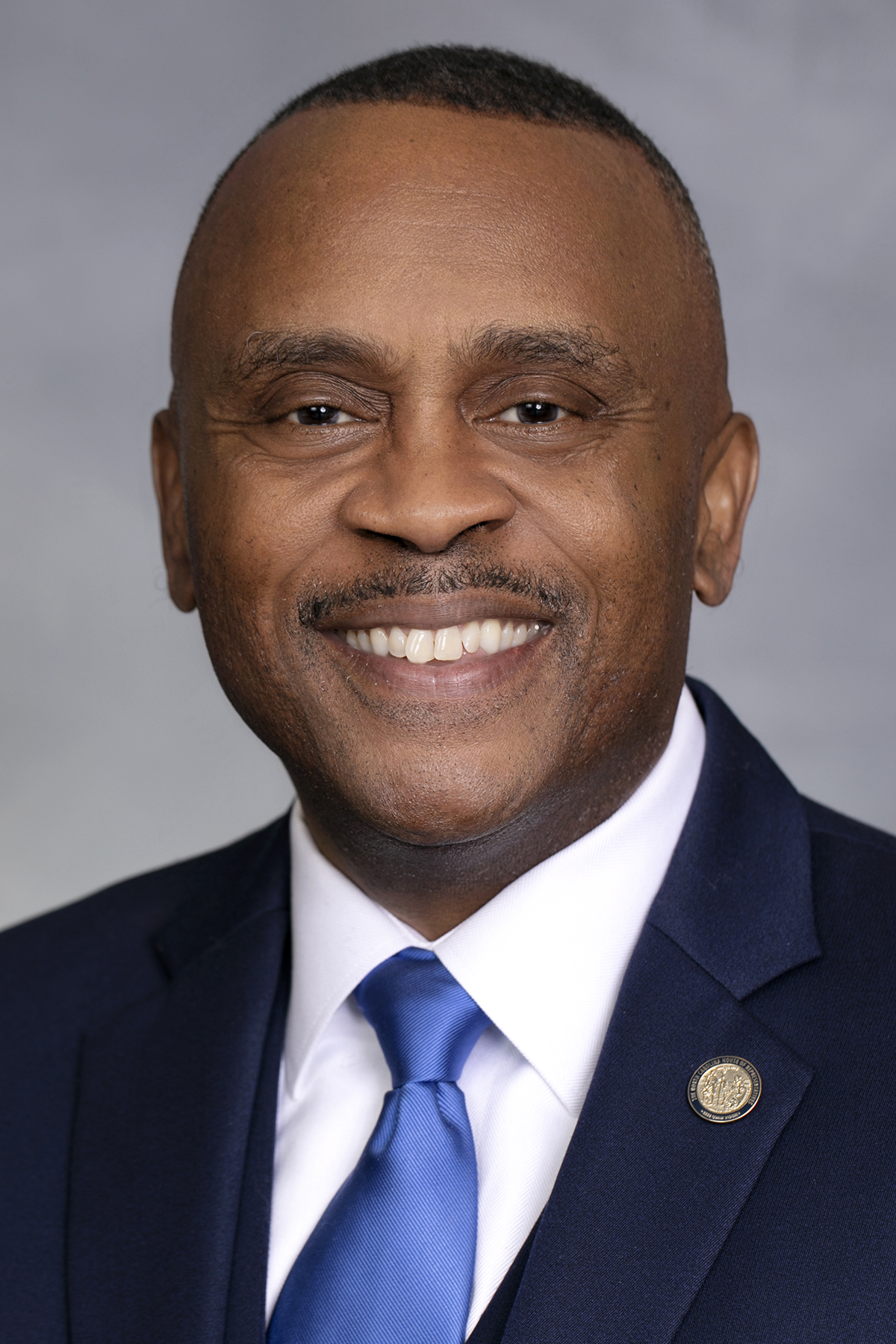
	Majority party	Minority party
Leader	Tim Moore	Robert Reives
Party	Republican	Democratic
Leader since	January 14, 2015	January 1, 2021
Leader's seat	111th – Kings Mountain	54th – Goldston
Last election	69 seats, 57.5%	51 seats, 42.5%
Seats after	71	49
Seat change	▲2	▼2
Popular vote	1,985,283	1,463,259
Percentage	57.25%	42.19%
Swing	▲7.26%	▼6.87%
- Democratic hold Democratic gain Republican hold Republican gain

Democratic
50–60%
60–70%
70–80%
80–90%
≥90%
Republican
50–60%
60–70%
70-80%
80–90%
≥90%
Speaker before election
Tim Moore
Republican
Elected Speaker
Tim Moore
Republican

An election was held on November 8, 2022, to elect all 120 members to North Carolina's House of Representatives. The election coincided with the elections for other offices, including the U.S Senate, U.S. House of Representatives, and State Senate. The primary election was originally going to be held on March 8, 2022, with a run-off in June 2022; however, the North Carolina Supreme Court delayed the primary until May 17, 2022, pending challenges over the State's districts and paused candidate filing. Prior to this pause, several candidates had already filed to run. The elections would be held under new districts passed by the General Assembly in House Bill 976 to account for population changes following the 2020 census. The maps were later overturned by the North Carolina Supreme Court, who ordered the legislature to draw new maps. The North Carolina General Assembly later redrew the maps (House Bill 980) which were upheld by the Wake County Superior Court and the North Carolina Supreme Court. Candidate filing resumed on February 24, 2022, and concluded on March 4, 2022.

== Predictions ==
Source	Ranking	As of
Sabato's Crystal Ball	Likely R	May 19, 2022

== Results summary ==
District	Incumbent	Party	Elected	Party
1st	Ed Goodwin	Rep	Ed Goodwin	Rep
1st	Paul O'Neal† (Note: Redistricted from the 6th District.)	Rep	Ed Goodwin	Rep
2nd	Larry Yarborough	Rep	Ray Jeffers	Dem
3rd	Steve Tyson	Rep	Steve Tyson	Rep
4th	Jimmy Dixon	Rep	Jimmy Dixon	Rep
5th	Howard Hunter III	Dem	Bill Ward	Rep
6th	New Seat		Joe Pike	Rep
7th	Matthew Winslow	Rep	Matthew Winslow	Rep
8th	Kandie Smith†	Dem	Gloristine Brown	Dem
9th	Brian Farkas	Dem	Timothy Reeder	Rep
10th	John Bell	Rep	John Bell	Rep
10th	Raymond Smith Jr.† (Note: Redistricted from the 21st district.)	Dem	John Bell	Rep
11th	Allison Dahle	Dem	Allison Dahle	Dem
12th	Chris Humphrey	Rep	Chris Humphrey	Rep
13th	Pat McElraft†	Rep	Celeste Cairns	Rep
14th	George Cleveland	Rep	George Cleveland	Rep
15th	Phil Shepard	Rep	Phil Shepard	Rep
16th	Carson Smith	Rep	Carson Smith	Rep
17th	Frank Iler	Rep	Frank Iler	Rep
18th	Deb Butler	Dem	Deb Butler	Dem
19th	Charlie Miller	Rep	Charlie Miller	Rep
20th	Ted Davis Jr.	Rep	Ted Davis Jr.	Rep
21st	New Seat		Ya Liu	Dem
22nd	William Brisson	Rep	William Brisson	Rep
23rd	Shelly Willingham	Dem	Shelly Willingham	Dem
24th	Linda Cooper-Suggs	Dem	Ken Fontenot	Rep
25th	James Gailliard	Dem	Allen Chesser	Rep
26th	Donna McDowell White	Rep	Donna McDowell White	Rep
27th	Michael Wray	Dem	Michael Wray	Dem
28th	Larry Strickland	Rep	Larry Strickland	Rep
29th	Vernetta Alston	Dem	Vernetta Alston	Dem
30th	Marcia Morey	Dem	Marcia Morey	Dem
31st	Zack Forde-Hawkins	Dem	Zack Forde-Hawkins	Dem
32nd	Terry Garrison	Dem	Frank Sossamon	Rep
33rd	Rosa Gill	Dem	Rosa Gill	Dem
34th	Jack Nichols†	Dem	Tim Longest	Dem
35th	Terence Everitt	Dem	Terence Everitt	Dem
36th	Julie von Haefen	Dem	Julie von Haefen	Dem
37th	Erin Paré	Rep	Erin Paré	Rep
38th	Abe Jones	Dem	Abe Jones	Dem
39th	James Roberson	Dem	James Roberson	Dem
40th	Joe John	Dem	Joe John	Dem
41st	Gale Adcock†	Dem	Maria Cervania	Dem
42nd	Marvin Lucas	Dem	Marvin Lucas	Dem
43rd	Diane Wheatley	Rep	Diane Wheatley	Rep
44th	Billy Richardson†	Dem	Charles Smith	Dem
45th	John Szoka†	Rep	Frances Jackson	Dem
46th	Brenden Jones	Rep	Brenden Jones	Rep
47th	Charles Graham†	Dem	Jarrod Lowery	Rep
48th	Garland Pierce	Dem	Garland Pierce	Dem
49th	Cynthia Ball	Dem	Cynthia Ball	Dem
50th	Graig Meyer†	Dem	Renee Price	Dem
51st	John Sauls	Rep	John Sauls	Rep
52nd	Ben Moss (Note: Redistricted from the 66th District.)	Rep	Ben Moss	Rep
52nd	Jamie Boles	Rep	Ben Moss	Rep
53rd	Howard Penny Jr.	Rep	Howard Penny Jr.	Rep
54th	Robert Reives	Dem	Robert Reives	Dem
55th	Mark Brody	Rep	Mark Brody	Rep
56th	Allen Buansi	Dem	Allen Buansi	Dem
57th	Ashton Clemmons	Dem	Ashton Clemmons	Dem
58th	Amos Quick	Dem	Amos Quick	Dem
59th	Jon Hardister	Rep	Jon Hardister	Rep
60th	Cecil Brockman	Dem	Cecil Brockman	Dem
61st	Pricey Harrison	Dem	Pricey Harrison	Dem
62nd	John Faircloth	Rep	John Faircloth	Rep
63rd	Ricky Hurtado	Dem	Stephen Ross	Rep
64th	Dennis Riddell	Rep	Dennis Riddell	Rep
65th	Reece Pyrtle	Rep	Reece Pyrtle	Rep
66th	New Seat		Sarah Crawford	Dem
67th	Wayne Sasser	Rep	Wayne Sasser	Rep
68th	David Willis	Rep	David Willis	Rep
69th	Dean Arp	Rep	Dean Arp	Rep
70th	Pat Hurley	Rep	Brian Biggs	Rep
71st	Evelyn Terry†	Dem	Kanika Brown	Dem
72nd	Amber Baker	Dem	Amber Baker	Dem
73rd	Larry Pittman† (Note: Redistricted from the 83rd District.)	Rep	Diamond Staton-Williams	Dem
74th	Jeff Zenger	Rep	Jeff Zenger	Rep
75th	Donny Lambeth	Rep	Donny Lambeth	Rep
76th	Harry Warren	Rep	Harry Warren	Rep
77th	Julia Craven Howard	Rep	Julia Craven Howard	Rep
77th	Lee Zachary† (Note: Redistricted from the 73rd district.)	Rep	Julia Craven Howard	Rep
78th	Allen McNeill†	Rep	Neal Jackson	Rep
79th	Keith Kidwell	Rep	Keith Kidwell	Rep
80th	Sam Watford	Rep	Sam Watford	Rep
81st	Larry Potts	Rep	Larry Potts	Rep
82nd	Kristin Baker	Rep	Kristin Baker	Rep
83rd	New Seat		Kevin Crutchfield	Rep
84th	Jeffrey McNeely	Rep	Jeffrey McNeely	Rep
85th	Dudley Greene	Rep	Dudley Greene	Rep
86th	Hugh Blackwell	Rep	Hugh Blackwell	Rep
87th	Destin Hall	Rep	Destin Hall	Rep
88th	Mary Belk	Dem	Mary Belk	Dem
89th	Mitchell Setzer	Rep	Mitchell Setzer	Rep
90th	Sarah Stevens	Rep	Sarah Stevens	Rep
91st	Kyle Hall	Rep	Kyle Hall	Rep
92nd	Terry Brown	Dem	Terry Brown	Dem
93rd	Ray Pickett	Rep	Ray Pickett	Rep
94th	Jeffrey Elmore	Rep	Jeffrey Elmore	Rep
95th	Grey Mills	Rep	Grey Mills	Rep
96th	Jay Adams	Rep	Jay Adams	Rep
97th	Jason Saine	Rep	Jason Saine	Rep
98th	John Bradford	Rep	John Bradford	Rep
99th	Nasif Majeed	Dem	Nasif Majeed	Dem
100th	John Autry	Dem	John Autry	Dem
101st	Carolyn Logan	Dem	Carolyn Logan	Dem
102nd	Becky Carney	Dem	Becky Carney	Dem
103rd	Rachel Hunt†	Dem	Laura Budd	Dem
104th	Brandon Lofton	Dem	Brandon Lofton	Dem
105th	Wesley Harris	Dem	Wesley Harris	Dem
106th	Carla Cunningham	Dem	Carla Cunningham	Dem
107th	Kelly Alexander	Dem	Kelly Alexander	Dem
108th	John Torbett	Rep	John Torbett	Rep
109th	Donnie Loftis	Rep	Donnie Loftis	Rep
110th	Kelly Hastings	Rep	Kelly Hastings	Rep
111th	Tim Moore	Rep	Tim Moore	Rep
112th	New Seat		Tricia Cotham	Dem
113th	Jake Johnson	Rep	Jake Johnson	Rep
113th	David Rogers (Note: Redistricted from the 112th District.)	Rep	Jake Johnson	Rep
114th	John Ager (Note: Redistricted from the 115th district.)	Dem	Eric Ager	Dem
115th	Brian Turner (Note: Redistricted from the 116th District.)	Dem	Lindsey Prather	Dem
116th	Caleb Rudow (Note: Redistricted from the 114th District.)	Dem	Caleb Rudow	Dem
117th	Tim Moffitt†	Rep	Jennifer Balkcom	Rep
118th	Mark Pless	Rep	Mark Pless	Rep
119th	Mike Clampitt	Rep	Mike Clampitt	Rep
120th	Karl Gillespie	Rep	Karl Gillespie	Rep

† - Incumbent not seeking re-election

Party	Candi- dates	Votes		Seats		
Party	Candi- dates	No.	%	No.	+/–	%
Republican	110	1,985,283	57.245	71	▲2	59.17
Democratic	90	1,463,259	42.193	49	▼2	40.83
Libertarian	15	19,503	0.562	0	Steady	0.00
Total	236	3,468,045	100%	120	Steady	100%

House seats
Republican	59.17%
Democratic	40.83%

Popular vote
Republican	57.245%
Democratic	42.193%
Libertarian	0.562%

=== Close races ===
Districts where the margin of victory was under 10%:

1. District 9, 1.18%
2. District 98, 1.86%
3. District 63, 2.16% (gain)
4. District 20, 2.28%
5. District 73, 2.28% (gain)
6. District 32, 2.66% (gain)
7. District 62, 4.32%
8. District 74, 4.74%
9. District 103, 4.96% (gain)
10. District 35, 5.94%
11. District 18, 6.62%
12. District 48, 7.04%
13. District 8, 7.14% (gain)
14. District 5, 7.66% (gain)
15. District 119, 7.80%
16. District 37, 7.83%
17. District 25, 8.19% (gain)
18. District 24, 8.44% (gain)
19. District 23, 8.84%
20. District 43, 9.98%

=== Incumbents defeated in primaries ===
==== Republicans ====
1. District 52: Jamie Boles lost renomination to fellow incumbent Ben Moss in a redistricting race.
2. District 70: Pat Hurley lost renomination to Brian Biggs.
3. District 113: David Rogers lost renomination to fellow incumbent Jake Johnson in a redistricting race.

=== Incumbents defeated in the general election ===
- Larry Yarborough (R-District 2), defeated by Ray Jeffers (D)
- Howard Hunter III (D-District 5), defeated by Bill Ward (R)
- Linda Cooper-Suggs (D-District 24), defeated by Ken Fontenot (R)
- James Gailliard (D-District 25), defeated by Allen Chesser (R)
- Terry Garrison (D-District 32), defeated by Frank Sossamon (R)
- Ricky Hurtado (D-District 63), defeated by Stephen Ross (R)
- Brian Farkas (D-District 9), defeated by Timothy Reeder (R)

=== Open seats that changed parties ===
- Charles Graham (D-District 47) retired to run for Congress, seat won by Jarrod Lowery (R)
- Larry Pittman (R-District 73) retired, seat won by Diamond Staton-Williams (D)

=== Newly created seats ===
- District 6 (Harnett County) won by Joe Pike (R)
- District 21 (Wake County) won by Ya Liu (D)
- District 66 (Wake County) won by Sarah Crawford (D)
- District 83 (Cabarrus & Rowan Counties) won by Kevin Crutchfield (R)
- District 112 (Mecklenburg County) won by Tricia Cotham (D)

== Detailed results ==
=== Districts 1-19 ===
==== District 1 ====
County results
Goodwin
- ≥90%

Precinct results
Goodwin
- ≥90%

The new 1st District includes the homes of incumbent Republicans Ed Goodwin, who had represented the 1st District since 2019, and Bobby Hanig, who had represented the 6th District since 2019. Hanig announced that he would not seek re-election, and instead would run for the State Senate.

North Carolina House of Representatives 1st district general election, 2022
Party	Candidate	Votes	%
Republican	Ed Goodwin (incumbent)	25,737	100%
Total votes		25,737	100%
Republican hold			

==== District 2 ====
County results Jeffers: 60–70%; Yarborough: 50–60%

Incumbent Republican Larry Yarborough had represented the 2nd District since 2015.

North Carolina House of Representatives 2nd district general election, 2022
Party	Candidate	Votes	%
Democratic	Ray Jeffers	19,692	54.57%
Republican	Larry Yarborough (incumbent)	15,674	43.44%
Libertarian	Gavin Bell	718	1.99%
Total votes		36,084	100%
Democratic gain from Republican			

==== District 3 ====
Incumbent Republican Steve Tyson had represented the 3rd District since 2021. He was running for re-election.

North Carolina House of Representatives 3rd district general election, 2022
Party	Candidate	Votes	%
Republican	Steve Tyson (incumbent)	23,739	100%
Total votes		23,739	100%
Republican hold			

==== District 4 ====
County results
Dixon
- 60–70%

Precinct results
Dixon
- 50–60%
- 60–70%
- 70–80%
- 80–90%
Boykin
- 50–60%
- 70–80%

Incumbent Republican Jimmy Dixon had represented the 4th District since 2011. He was running for re-election.

North Carolina House of Representatives 4th district general election, 2022
Party	Candidate	Votes	%
Republican	Jimmy Dixon (incumbent)	16,449	66.58%
Democratic	Wesley L. Boykin	8,256	33.42%
Total votes		24,705	100%
Republican hold			

==== District 5 ====
County results Ward: 50–60%; 70–80%; Hunter: 60–70%

Incumbent Democratic Howard Hunter III had represented the 5th District since 2015. Bill Ward won the Republican nomination and then defeated Hunter in the general election.

North Carolina House of Representatives 5th District Republican primary election, 2022
Party	Candidate	Votes	%
Republican	Bill Ward	3,359	68.27%
Republican	Donald Kirkland	1,561	31.73%
Total votes		4,920	100%

North Carolina House of Representatives 5th district general election, 2022
Party	Candidate	Votes	%
Republican	Bill Ward	15,784	53.83%
Democratic	Howard Hunter III (incumbent)	13,539	46.17%
Total votes		29,323	100%
Republican gain from Democratic			

==== District 6 ====
Precinct results Pike: 50–60%; 60–70%; 70–80%; Johnson: 50–60%; Tie: 50%

The new 6th District is based in Harnett County and had no incumbent. Joe Pike won the Republican nomination, defeating Murray Simpkins. Pike won the Republican nomination and then easily won the general election.

North Carolina House of Representatives 6th District Republican primary election, 2022
Party	Candidate	Votes	%
Republican	Joe Pike	1,667	51.23%
Republican	Murray Simpkins	1,587	48.77%
Total votes		3,254	100%

North Carolina House of Representatives 6th district general election, 2022
Party	Candidate	Votes	%
Republican	Joe Pike	11,591	60.64%
Democratic	Kiara Johnson	7,522	39.36%
Total votes		19,113	100%
Republican win (new seat)			

==== District 7 ====
Incumbent Republican Matthew Winslow had represented the 7th District since 2021.

North Carolina House of Representatives 7th district general election, 2022
Party	Candidate	Votes	%
Republican	Matthew Winslow (incumbent)	24,137	100%
Total votes		24,137	100%
Republican hold			

==== District 8 ====
Incumbent Democrat Kandie Smith had represented the 8th District since 2019. Smith was retiring to run for the State Senate. Sharon McDonald Evans and Gloristine Brown sought the Democratic nomination. Brown won the Democratic nomination.

North Carolina House of Representatives 8th District Democratic primary election, 2022
Party	Candidate	Votes	%
Democratic	Gloristine Brown	3,031	59.11%
Democratic	Sharon McDonald Evans	2,097	40.89%
Total votes		5,128	100%

North Carolina House of Representatives 8th district general election, 2022
Party	Candidate	Votes	%
Democratic	Gloristine Brown	13,116	53.57%
Republican	Charles "Drock" Vincent	11,366	46.43%
Total votes		24,482	100%
Democratic hold			

==== District 9 ====
Incumbent Democrat Brian Farkas had represented the 9th District since 2021. Timothy Reeder won the Republican nomination, defeating former state senator Tony Moore in the Republican primary, and defeating Farkas in the general by the narrowest margin of any race in the House of Representatives of the cycle.

North Carolina House of Representatives 9th District Republican primary election, 2022
Party	Candidate	Votes	%
Republican	Timothy Reeder	3,318	57.93%
Republican	Tony Moore	2,410	42.07%
Total votes		5,728	100%

North Carolina House of Representatives 9th district general election, 2022
Party	Candidate	Votes	%
Republican	Timothy Reeder	15,212	50.59%
Democratic	Brian Farkas (incumbent)	14,858	49.41%
Total votes		30,070	100%
Republican gain from Democratic			

==== District 10 ====
Precinct results Bell: ≥90%

The new 10th District includes the homes of incumbent Republican Majority Leader John Bell, who had represented the 10th District since 2013, and incumbent Democrat Raymond Smith Jr., who had represented the 21st District since 2019. Smith was retiring to run for the State Senate.

North Carolina House of Representatives 10th district general election, 2022
Party	Candidate	Votes	%
Republican	John Bell (incumbent)	17,796	100%
Total votes		17,796	100%
Republican hold			

==== District 11 ====
Precinct results Dahle: ≥90%

Incumbent Democrat Allison Dahle had represented the 11th District since 2019.

North Carolina House of Representatives 11th district general election, 2022
Party	Candidate	Votes	%
Democratic	Allison Dahle (incumbent)	20,946	100%
Total votes		20,946	100%
Democratic hold			

==== District 12 ====
Incumbent Republican Chris Humphrey had represented the 12th District since 2019. He was running for re-election.

North Carolina House of Representatives 12th district general election, 2022
Party	Candidate	Votes	%
Republican	Chris Humphrey (incumbent)	17,486	61.42%
Democratic	Lillie Williams	10,983	38.58%
Total votes		28,469	100%
Republican hold			

==== District 13 ====
County results
Cairns
- 60-70%
- 70-80%

Precinct results
Cairns
- 50–60%
- 60–70%
- 70–80%
- 80–90%
Tomberlin
- 50–60%

Incumbent Republican Pat McElraft had represented the 13th District since 2007. She was retiring. Celeste Cairns won the Republican nomination, defeating Pete Benton and Eden Gordon Hill.

North Carolina House of Representatives 13th District Republican primary election, 2022
Party	Candidate	Votes	%
Republican	Celeste Cairns	6,271	54.88%
Republican	Pete Benton	3,984	34.86%
Republican	Eden Gordon Hill	1,172	10.26%
Total votes		11,427	100%

North Carolina House of Representatives 13th district general election, 2022
Party	Candidate	Votes	%
Republican	Celeste Cairns	25,850	71.32%
Democratic	Katie Tomberlin	10,394	28.68%
Total votes		36,244	100%
Republican hold			

==== District 14 ====
Precinct results Cleveland: 50–60%; 70–80%; 80–90%; Johnson: 80–90%

Incumbent Republican George Cleveland had represented the 14th District since 2005. Debbie Burke was challenging Cleveland for the Republican nomination. Eric Whitfield and Isiah "Ike" Johnson sought the Democratic nomination.

North Carolina House of Representatives 14th District Democratic primary election, 2022
Party	Candidate	Votes	%
Democratic	Isaiah "Ike" Johnson	1,321	84.46%
Democratic	Eric Whitfield	243	15.54%
Total votes		1,564	100%

North Carolina House of Representatives 14th district general election, 2022
Party	Candidate	Votes	%
Republican	George Cleveland (incumbent)	9,418	66.21%
Democratic	Isiah "Ike" Johnson	4,807	33.79%
Total votes		14,225	100%
Republican hold			

==== District 15 ====
Precinct results Shepard: 50–60%; 60–70%; 70–80%; 80–90%

Incumbent Republican Phil Shepard had represented the 15th District since 2011.

North Carolina House of Representatives 15th district general election, 2022
Party	Candidate	Votes	%
Republican	Phil Shepard (incumbent)	14,512	68.06%
Democratic	Christopher Schulte	6,810	31.94%
Total votes		21,322	100%
Republican hold			

==== District 16 ====
County results
Smith
- ≥90%

Precinct results
Smith
- ≥90%

Incumbent Republican Carson Smith had represented the 16th District since 2019.

North Carolina House of Representatives 16th district general election, 2022
Party	Candidate	Votes	%
Republican	Carson Smith (incumbent)	23,902	100%
Total votes		23,902	100%
Republican hold			

==== District 17 ====
Precinct results Iler: 50–60%; 60–70%; 80–90%; Terashima: 60–70%

Incumbent Republican Frank Iler had represented the 17th District since 2009. Edward M. McKeithan and Eric Terashima sought the Democratic nomination.

North Carolina House of Representatives 17th District Democratic primary election, 2022
Party	Candidate	Votes	%
Democratic	Eric Terashima	2,968	70.75%
Democratic	Edward M. McKeithan	1,227	29.25%
Total votes		4,195	100%

North Carolina House of Representatives 17th district general election, 2022
Party	Candidate	Votes	%
Republican	Frank Iler (incumbent)	28,012	62.29%
Democratic	Eric Terashima	16,960	37.71%
Total votes		44,972	100%
Republican hold			

==== District 18 ====
Incumbent Democrat Deb Butler had represented the 18th District since 2017.

North Carolina House of Representatives 18th district general election, 2022
Party	Candidate	Votes	%
Democratic	Deb Butler (incumbent)	19,190	53.31%
Republican	John Hinnant	16,806	46.69%
Total votes		35,996	100%
Democratic hold			

==== District 19 ====
County results
Miller
- ≥90%

Precinct results
Miller
- ≥90%

Incumbent Republican Charlie Miller had represented the 19th District since 2021.

North Carolina House of Representatives 19th district general election, 2022
Party	Candidate	Votes	%
Republican	Charlie Miller (incumbent)	33,131	100%
Total votes		33,131	100%
Republican hold			

=== Districts 20-39 ===
==== District 20 ====
Incumbent Republican Ted Davis Jr. had represented the 20th District and its predecessors since 2012.

North Carolina House of Representatives 20th district general election, 2022
Party	Candidate	Votes	%
Republican	Ted Davis Jr. (incumbent)	19,075	51.14%
Democratic	Amy Block DeLoach	18,228	48.86%
Total votes		37,303	100%
Republican hold			

==== District 21 ====
The new 21st District is based in western Wake County and had no incumbent. Cary Town Council member Ya Liu won the open seat.

North Carolina House of Representatives 21st district general election, 2022
Party	Candidate	Votes	%
Democratic	Ya Liu	18,857	67.69%
Republican	Gerard Falzon	8,342	29.95%
Libertarian	Joshua Morris	658	2.36%
Total votes		27,857	100%
Democratic win (new seat)			

==== District 22 ====
County results
Brisson
- ≥90%

Precinct results
Brisson
- ≥90%

Incumbent Republican William Brisson had represented the 22nd District since 2007.

North Carolina House of Representatives 22nd district general election, 2022
Party	Candidate	Votes	%
Republican	William Brisson (incumbent)	20,633	100%
Total votes		20,633	100%
Republican hold			

==== District 23 ====
County results Willingham: 50–60%; Proctor: 50–60%

Incumbent Democrat Shelly Willingham had represented the 23rd District since 2015.

North Carolina House of Representatives 23rd district general election, 2022
Party	Candidate	Votes	%
Democratic	Shelly Willingham (incumbent)	16,488	54.42%
Republican	James Crowell Proctor	13,809	45.58%
Total votes		30,297	100%
Democratic hold			

==== District 24 ====
County results Fontenot: 50–60%; 70–80%

Incumbent Democrat Linda Cooper-Suggs had represented the 24th District since 2020. She lost re-election to Republican Ken Fontenot.

North Carolina House of Representatives 24th district general election, 2022
Party	Candidate	Votes	%
Republican	Ken Fontenot	15,121	54.22%
Democratic	Linda Cooper-Suggs (incumbent)	12,768	45.78%
Total votes		27,889	100%
Republican gain from Democratic			

==== District 25 ====
Incumbent Democrat James Gailliard had represented the 25th District since 2019. Allen Chesser won the Republican nomination, defeating Alsey Beth Hopkins and Yvonne McLeod. Chesser then defeated Gailliard in the general election.

North Carolina House of Representatives 25th District Republican primary election, 2022
Party	Candidate	Votes	%
Republican	Allen Chesser	3,631	49.73%
Republican	Yvonne McLeod	3,322	45.50%
Republican	Alsey Heth Hopkins	348	4.77%
Total votes		7,301	100%

North Carolina House of Representatives 25th district general election, 2022
Party	Candidate	Votes	%
Republican	Allen Chesser	17,903	52.85%
Democratic	James Gailliard (incumbent)	15,128	44.66%
Libertarian	Nick Taylor	841	2.48%
Total votes		33,872	100%
Republican gain from Democratic			

==== District 26 ====
Incumbent Republican Donna McDowell White had represented the 26th District since 2017. Rick Walker unsuccessfully challenged McDowell White for the Republican nomination.

North Carolina House of Representatives 26th District Republican primary election, 2022
Party	Candidate	Votes	%
Republican	Donna McDowell White (incumbent)	4,851	65.81%
Republican	Rick Walker	2,520	34.19%
Total votes		7,371	100%

North Carolina House of Representatives 26th district general election, 2022
Party	Candidate	Votes	%
Republican	Donna McDowell White (incumbent)	19,984	59.18%
Democratic	Linda Bennett	13,783	40.82%
Total votes		33,767	100%
Republican hold			

==== District 27 ====
County results Wray: 50–60%

Incumbent Democrat Michael Wray had represented the 27th District since 2005. Jerry McDaniel unsuccessfully challenged Wray for the Democratic nomination. Halifax County Sheriff Wes Tripp was unopposed for the Republican nomination.

North Carolina House of Representatives 27th District Democratic primary election, 2022
Party	Candidate	Votes	%
Democratic	Michael Wray (incumbent)	10,866	79.00%
Democratic	Jerry McDaniel	2,889	21.00%
Total votes		13,755	100%

North Carolina House of Representatives 27th district general election, 2022
Party	Candidate	Votes	%
Democratic	Michael Wray (incumbent)	18,116	61.44%
Republican	Wes Tripp	11,370	38.56%
Total votes		29,486	100%
Democratic hold			

==== District 28 ====
Incumbent Republican Larry Strickland had represented the 28th District since 2017. James Davenport unsuccessfully challenged Strickland for the Republican nomination.

North Carolina House of Representatives 28th District Republican primary election, 2022
Party	Candidate	Votes	%
Republican	Larry Strickland (incumbent)	6,482	83.47%
Republican	Jim Davenport	1,284	16.53%
Total votes		7,766	100%

North Carolina House of Representatives 28th district general election, 2022
Party	Candidate	Votes	%
Republican	Larry Strickland (incumbent)	18,838	71.94%
Democratic	Wendy Ella May	7,349	28.06%
Total votes		26,187	100%
Republican hold			

==== District 29 ====
Precinct results Alston: ≥90%

Incumbent Democrat Vernetta Alston had represented the 29th District since 2020.

North Carolina House of Representatives 29th district general election, 2022
Party	Candidate	Votes	%
Democratic	Vernetta Alston (incumbent)	35,220	100%
Total votes		35,220	100%
Democratic hold			

==== District 30 ====
Incumbent Democrat Marcia Morey had represented the 30th District since 2017.

North Carolina House of Representatives 30th district general election, 2022
Party	Candidate	Votes	%
Democratic	Marcia Morey (incumbent)	29,614	86.36%
Republican	William G. Antico	4,036	11.77%
Libertarian	Guy Meilleur	640	1.87%
Total votes		34,290	100%
Democratic hold			

==== District 31 ====
Incumbent Democrat Zack Forde-Hawkins had represented the 31st District since 2019.

North Carolina House of Representatives 31st district general election, 2022
Party	Candidate	Votes	%
Democratic	Zack Forde-Hawkins (incumbent)	24,814	84.20%
Libertarian	Sean Haugh	4,658	15.80%
Total votes		29,472	100%
Democratic hold			

==== District 32 ====
County results
Sossamon
- 50-60%
Garrison
- 50-60%

Precinct results
Sossamon
- 50-60%
- 60-70%
Garrison
- 50-60%
- 60-70%
- 70-80%
- 80-90%

Incumbent Democrat Terry Garrison had represented the 32nd District since 2017. Garrison lost re-election to Republican Frank Sossamon.

North Carolina House of Representatives district general election, 2022
Party	Candidate	Votes	%
Republican	Frank Sossamon	14,156	51.33%
Democratic	Terry Garrison (incumbent)	13,424	48.67%
Total votes		27,580	100%
Republican gain from Democratic			

==== District 33 ====
Incumbent Democrat Rosa Gill had represented the 33rd District since 2009. Nate Blanton unsuccessfully challenged Gill for the Democratic nomination.

North Carolina House of Representatives 33rd District Democratic primary election, 2022
Party	Candidate	Votes	%
Democratic	Rosa Gill (incumbent)	6,257	86.13%
Democratic	Nate Blanton	1,008	13.87%
Total votes		7,265	100%

North Carolina House of Representatives 33rd district general election, 2022
Party	Candidate	Votes	%
Democratic	Rosa Gill (incumbent)	19,471	59.60%
Republican	Stephanie Dingee	12,191	37.32%
Libertarian	Chris Costello	1,008	3.09%
Total votes		32,670	100%
Democratic hold			

==== District 34 ====
Incumbent Democrat Grier Martin had represented the 34th District since 2013, but he resigned on July 8, 2022, and ended his re-election campaign. Fellow Democrat Jack Nichols was appointed to finish the remainder of Martin's term. Zach Padgett was initially chosen to replace Martin on the ballot, but he later withdrew and was replaced by Tim Longest. Ashley Seshul defeated Joshua Jordan to win the Republican nomination. Longest won the open seat.

North Carolina House of Representatives 34th District Republican primary election, 2022
Party	Candidate	Votes	%
Republican	Ashley Seshul	3,907	70.79%
Republican	Joshua Jordan	1,612	29.21%
Total votes		5,519	100%

North Carolina House of Representatives 34th district general election, 2022
Party	Candidate	Votes	%
Democratic	Tim Longest	24,413	60.27%
Republican	Ashley Seshul	14,853	36.67%
Libertarian	Kat McDonald	1,240	3.06%
Total votes		40,506	100%
Democratic hold			

==== District 35 ====
Incumbent Democrat Terence Everitt had represented the 35th District since 2019. Fred Von Canon won the Republican nomination, defeating Brandon Panameno.

North Carolina House of Representatives 35th District Republican primary election, 2022
Party	Candidate	Votes	%
Republican	Fred Von Canon	4,602	79.45%
Republican	Brandon Panameno	1,190	20.55%
Total votes		5,792	100%

North Carolina House of Representatives 35th district general election, 2022
Party	Candidate	Votes	%
Democratic	Terence Everitt (incumbent)	19,313	51.99%
Republican	Fred Von Canon	17,106	46.05%
Libertarian	Joseph Serio	728	1.96%
Total votes		37,147	100%
Democratic hold			

==== District 36 ====
Incumbent Democrat Julie von Haefen had represented the 36th District since 2019.

North Carolina House of Representatives 36th district general election, 2022
Party	Candidate	Votes	%
Democratic	Julie von Haefen (incumbent)	21,966	56.10%
Republican	John Harris	16,220	41.43%
Libertarian	Kyle Ward	968	2.47%
Total votes		39,154	100%
Democratic hold			

==== District 37 ====
Incumbent Republican Erin Paré had represented the 37th District since 2021. Mary Bethel, Christine Kelly, and Elizabeth Parent sought the Democratic nomination. Kelly won the Democratic nomination.

North Carolina House of Representatives 37th District Democratic primary election, 2022
Party	Candidate	Votes	%
Democratic	Christine Kelly	2,066	38.53%
Democratic	Elizabeth Parent	2,002	37.34%
Democratic	Mary Bethel	1,294	24.13%
Total votes		5,362	100%

North Carolina House of Representatives 37th district general election, 2022
Party	Candidate	Votes	%
Republican	Erin Paré (incumbent)	21,260	52.84%
Democratic	Christine Kelly	18,110	45.01%
Libertarian	Christopher Robinson	862	2.14%
Total votes		40,232	100%
Republican hold			

==== District 38 ====
Incumbent Democrat Abe Jones had represented the 38th District since 2021.

North Carolina House of Representatives 38th district general election, 2022
Party	Candidate	Votes	%
Democratic	Abe Jones (incumbent)	24,036	87.45%
Libertarian	Christopher Mizelle	3,450	12.55%
Total votes		27,486	100%
Democratic hold			

==== District 39 ====
Incumbent Democrat James Roberson had represented the 39th District since his appointment on January 11, 2021. He was elected to a full term.

North Carolina House of Representatives 39th district general election, 2022
Party	Candidate	Votes	%
Democratic	James Roberson (incumbent)	18,545	60.18%
Republican	Greg Jones	12,273	39.82%
Total votes		30,818	100%
Democratic hold			

=== Districts 40-59 ===
==== District 40 ====
Incumbent Democrat Joe John had represented the 40th District since 2017. Marguerite Creel unsuccessfully challenged John for the Democratic nomination. John defeated former representative Marilyn Avila in the general election.

North Carolina House of Representatives 40th district Democratic primary election, 2022
Party	Candidate	Votes	%
Democratic	Joe John (incumbent)	5,520	74.10%
Democratic	Marguerite Creel	1,929	25.90%
Total votes		7,449	100%

North Carolina House of Representatives 40th district general election, 2022
Party	Candidate	Votes	%
Democratic	Joe John (incumbent)	24,630	54.78%
Republican	Marilyn Avila	19,224	42.75%
Libertarian	Michael Nelson	1,111	2.47%
Total votes		44,965	100%
Democratic hold			

==== District 41 ====
Incumbent Democratic Deputy Minority Leader Gale Adcock had represented the 41st District since 2015. Adcock retired to run for the State Senate. Wake County Commissioner Maria Cervania won the open seat.

North Carolina House of Representatives 41st district general election, 2022
Party	Candidate	Votes	%
Democratic	Maria Cervania	24,096	63.92%
Republican	Bruce K. Forster	12,629	33.50%
Libertarian	Kevin Terrett	970	2.57%
Total votes		37,695	100%
Democratic hold			

==== District 42 ====
Precinct results Lucas: 50–60%; 60–70%; 70–80%; 80–90%

Incumbent Democrat Marvin Lucas had represented the 42nd District since 2001. Naveed Aziz unsuccessfully challenged Lucas for the Democratic nomination.

North Carolina House of Representatives 42nd district Democratic primary election, 2022
Party	Candidate	Votes	%
Democratic	Marvin Lucas (incumbent)	2,660	55.85%
Democratic	Naveed Aziz	2,103	44.15%
Total votes		4,763	100%

North Carolina House of Representatives 42nd district general election, 2022
Party	Candidate	Votes	%
Democratic	Marvin Lucas (incumbent)	10,563	71.27%
Republican	Gloria Carrasco	4,258	28.73%
Total votes		14,821	100%
Democratic hold			

==== District 43 ====
Precinct results Wheatley: 50–60%; 60–70%; 70–80%; Floyd: 50–60%; 60–70%; 80–90%

Incumbent Republican Diane Wheatley had represented the 43rd District since 2021. Former representative Elmer Floyd won the Democratic nomination.

North Carolina House of Representatives 43rd district Democratic primary election, 2022
Party	Candidate	Votes	%
Democratic	Elmer Floyd	3,581	59.93%
Democratic	Kimberly Hardy	2,150	35.98%
Democratic	Prince Christian	244	4.08%
Total votes		5,975	100%

North Carolina House of Representatives 43rd district general election, 2022
Party	Candidate	Votes	%
Republican	Diane Wheatley (incumbent)	14,389	54.99%
Democratic	Elmer Floyd	11,778	45.01%
Total votes		26,167	100%
Republican hold			

==== District 44 ====
Precinct results Smith: ≥90%

Incumbent Democrat Billy Richardson had represented the 44th District since 2015. Richardson did not seek re-election. Charles Smith won the Democratic nomination and ran unopposed in the general election.

North Carolina House of Representatives 44th district Democratic primary election, 2022
Party	Candidate	Votes	%
Democratic	Charles Smith	3,650	61.77%
Democratic	Terry L. Johnson Sr.	2,259	38.23%
Total votes		5,909	100%

North Carolina House of Representatives 44th district general election, 2022
Party	Candidate	Votes	%
Democratic	Charles Smith	14,903	100%
Total votes		14,903	100%
Democratic hold			

==== District 45 ====
Precinct results Jackson: 50–60%; 60–70%; 80–90%; Chapman: 50–60%

Incumbent Republican John Szoka had represented the 45th District since 2013. Szoka originally announced that he would retire to run for Congress, but switched races and chose to run for the Cumberland County Commission. Keith Byrd, Chris Davis, and 2020 nominee Frances Jackson sought the Democratic nomination. Jackson won the Democratic nomination and then defeated Republican nominee Susan Chapman in the general election.

North Carolina House of Representatives 45th district Democratic primary election, 2022
Party	Candidate	Votes	%
Democratic	Frances Jackson	2,228	52.45%
Democratic	Chris Davis	1,746	41.10%
Democratic	Keith Byrd	274	6.45%
Total votes		4,248	100%

North Carolina House of Representatives 45th district general election, 2022
Party	Candidate	Votes	%
Democratic	Frances Jackson	11,148	55.16%
Republican	Susan Chapman	9,064	44.84%
Total votes		20,212	100%
Democratic gain from Republican			

==== District 46 ====
County results
Jones
- ≥90%

Precinct results
Jones
- ≥90%

Incumbent Republican Brenden Jones had represented the 46th District since 2017.

North Carolina House of Representatives 46th district general election, 2022
Party	Candidate	Votes	%
Republican	Brenden Jones (incumbent)	19,928	100%
Total votes		19,928	100%
Republican hold			

==== District 47 ====
Precinct results Lowrey: 50–60%; 60–70%; 70–80%; 80–90%; Townsend: 50–60%; 60–70%; 80–90%

Incumbent Democrat Charles Graham had represented the 47th District since 2011. Graham was retiring to run for Congress. Jarrod Lowery won the Republican nomination. Charles Townsend won the Democratic nomination.

North Carolina House of Representatives 47th district Democratic primary election, 2022
Party	Candidate	Votes	%
Democratic	Charles Townsend	3,355	63.82%
Democratic	Aminah Ghaffar	1,902	36.18%
Total votes		5,257	100%

North Carolina House of Representatives 47th district Republican primary election, 2022
Party	Candidate	Votes	%
Republican	Jarrod Lowery	1,310	70.05%
Republican	Mickey Biggs	560	29.95%
Total votes		1,870	100%

North Carolina House of Representatives 47th district general election, 2022
Party	Candidate	Votes	%
Republican	Jarrod Lowery	11,386	60.76%
Democratic	Charles Townsend	7,353	39.24%
Total votes		18,739	100%
Republican gain from Democratic			

==== District 48 ====
County results Pierce: 50–60%; Swarbrick: 50–60%

Incumbent Democrat Garland Pierce had represented the 48th District since 2005.

North Carolina House of Representatives 48th district general election, 2022
Party	Candidate	Votes	%
Democratic	Garland Pierce (incumbent)	12,073	53.52%
Republican	Melissa Swarbrick	10,486	46.48%
Total votes		22,559	100%
Democratic hold			

==== District 49 ====
Incumbent Democrat Cynthia Ball had represented the 49th District since 2017.

North Carolina House of Representatives 49th district general election, 2022
Party	Candidate	Votes	%
Democratic	Cynthia Ball (incumbent)	22,519	67.77%
Republican	David Robertson	9,764	29.38%
Libertarian	Michael Oakes	946	2.85%
Total votes		33,229	100%
Democratic hold			

==== District 50 ====
County results Price: 60–70%; Lopez: 60–70%

Incumbent Democrat Graig Meyer had represented the 50th District since 2013. Meyer was retiring to run for the State Senate. Renee Price won the Democratic nomination, defeating Matt Hughes.

North Carolina House of Representatives 50th district Democratic primary election, 2022
Party	Candidate	Votes	%
Democratic	Renee Price	8,458	72.02%
Democratic	Matt Hughes	3,286	27.98%
Total votes		11,744	100%

North Carolina House of Representatives 50th district general election, 2022
Party	Candidate	Votes	%
Democratic	Renee Price	22,732	59.45%
Republican	Charles Lopez	15,503	40.55%
Total votes		38,235	100%
Democratic hold			

==== District 51 ====
County results Sauls: 60–70%; 70–80%

Incumbent Republican John Sauls had represented the 51st District since 2017.

North Carolina House of Representatives 51st district general election, 2022
Party	Candidate	Votes	%
Republican	John Sauls (incumbent)	16,973	64.98%
Democratic	Malcolm Hall	9,147	35.02%
Total votes		26,120	100%
Republican hold			

==== District 52 ====
County results
Moss
- ≥90%

Precinct results
Moss
- ≥90%

The new 52nd District includes the homes of incumbent Republicans Jamie Boles, who had represented the 52nd District since 2009, and Ben Moss, who had represented the 66th District since 2021. Moss defeated Boles to win the Republican nomination.

North Carolina House of Representatives 52nd district Republican primary election, 2022
Party	Candidate	Votes	%
Republican	Ben Moss (incumbent)	3,688	53.34%
Republican	Jamie Boles (incumbent)	3,226	46.66%
Total votes		6,914	100%

North Carolina House of Representatives 52nd district general election, 2022
Party	Candidate	Votes	%
Republican	Ben Moss (incumbent)	19,640	100%
Total votes		19,640	100%
Republican hold			

==== District 53 ====
County results Penny: 60–70%

Incumbent Republican Howard Penny Jr. had represented the 53rd District since 2020. Brian Hawley challenged Penny for the Republican nomination.

North Carolina House of Representatives 53rd district Republican primary election, 2022
Party	Candidate	Votes	%
Republican	Howard Penny Jr. (incumbent)	5,142	63.25%
Republican	Brian Hawley	2,988	36.75%
Total votes		8,130	100%

North Carolina House of Representatives 53rd district general election, 2022
Party	Candidate	Votes	%
Republican	Howard Penny Jr. (incumbent)	22,118	67.14%
Democratic	Kevin G. Thurman	10,824	32.86%
Total votes		32,942	100%
Republican hold			

==== District 54 ====
County results
Reives
- 50-60%
Petty
- 70-80%

Precinct results
Reives
- 50-60%
- 60-70%
- 70-80%
Petty
- 50-60%
- 60-70%
- 70-80%
- 80-90%

Incumbent Democratic Minority Leader Robert Reives had represented the 54th District since 2014. Republican former Chatham County commissioner Walter Petty and Craig Kinsey sought the Republican nomination.

North Carolina House of Representatives 54th district Republican primary election, 2022
Party	Candidate	Votes	%
Republican	Walter Petty	4,443	64.25%
Republican	Craig Kinsey	2,472	35.75%
Total votes		6,915	100%

North Carolina House of Representatives 54th district general election, 2022
Party	Candidate	Votes	%
Democratic	Robert Reives (incumbent)	23,105	55.29%
Republican	Walter Petty	18,684	44.71%
Total votes		41,789	100%
Democratic hold			

==== District 55 ====
County results
Brody
- ≥90%

Precinct results
Brody
- ≥90%

Incumbent Republican Mark Brody had represented the 55th District since 2013. Brandon Smith challenged Brody for the Republican nomination.

North Carolina House of Representatives 55th district Republican primary election, 2022
Party	Candidate	Votes	%
Republican	Mark Brody (incumbent)	4,740	84.46%
Republican	Brandon Smith	872	15.54%
Total votes		5,612	100%

North Carolina House of Representatives 55th district general election, 2022
Party	Candidate	Votes	%
Republican	Mark Brody (incumbent)	18,930	100%
Total votes		18,930	100%
Republican hold			

==== District 56 ====
Precinct results Buansi: ≥90%

Incumbent Democrat Verla Insko had represented the 56th District and its predecessors since 1997. Insko was not seeking re-election. Jonah Garson and Allen Buansi are seeking the Democratic nomination.

North Carolina House of Representatives 56th district Democratic primary election, 2022
Party	Candidate	Votes	%
Democratic	Allen Buansi	7,715	51.54%
Democratic	Jonah Garson	7,253	48.46%
Total votes		14,968	100%

North Carolina House of Representatives 56th district general election, 2022
Party	Candidate	Votes	%
Democratic	Allen Buansi (incumbent)	32,064	100%
Total votes		32,064	100%
Democratic hold			

==== District 57 ====
Incumbent Democrat Ashton Clemmons had represented the 57th District since 2019.

North Carolina House of Representatives 57th district general election, 2022
Party	Candidate	Votes	%
Democratic	Ashton Clemmons (incumbent)	20,186	55.07%
Republican	Michelle C. Bardsley	16,467	44.93%
Total votes		36,653	100%
Democratic hold			

==== District 58 ====
Incumbent Democrat Amos Quick had represented the 58th District since 2017.

North Carolina House of Representatives 58th district general election, 2022
Party	Candidate	Votes	%
Democratic	Amos Quick (incumbent)	17,217	69.16%
Republican	Chrissy Smith	7,679	30.84%
Total votes		24,896	100%
Democratic hold			

==== District 59 ====
Incumbent Republican Jon Hardister had represented the 59th District since 2013. He was running for re-election. Eddie Aday and Sherrie Young are seeking the Democratic nomination.

North Carolina House of Representatives 59th district Democratic primary election, 2022
Party	Candidate	Votes	%
Democratic	Sherrie Young	4,478	74.35%
Democratic	Eddie Aday	1,545	25.65%
Total votes		6,023	100%

North Carolina House of Representatives 59th district general election, 2022
Party	Candidate	Votes	%
Republican	Jon Hardister (incumbent)	19,558	56.33%
Democratic	Sherrie Young	15,163	43.67%
Total votes		34,721	100%
Republican hold			

=== Districts 60-79 ===
==== District 60 ====
Incumbent Democrat Cecil Brockman had represented the 60th District since 2015.

North Carolina House of Representatives 60th district general election, 2022
Party	Candidate	Votes	%
Democratic	Cecil Brockman (incumbent)	14,686	58.94%
Republican	Bob Blasingame	10,232	41.06%
Total votes		24,918	100%
Democratic hold			

==== District 61 ====
Incumbent Democrat Pricey Harrison had represented the 61st District and its predecessors since 2005.

North Carolina House of Representatives 61st district general election, 2022
Party	Candidate	Votes	%
Democratic	Pricey Harrison (incumbent)	19,862	100%
Total votes		19,862	100%
Democratic hold			

==== District 62 ====
Incumbent Republican John Faircloth had represented the 62nd District and its predecessors since 2011.

North Carolina House of Representatives 62nd district general election, 2022
Party	Candidate	Votes	%
Republican	John Faircloth (incumbent)	20,404	52.16%
Democratic	Brandon Gray	18,717	47.84%
Total votes		39,121	100%
Republican hold			

==== District 63 ====
Incumbent Democrat Ricky Hurtado had represented the 63rd District since 2021. Ed Priola, former representative Stephen Ross, and Peter Boykin sought the Republican nomination, with Ross winning the primary and then defeating Hurtado in the general election.

North Carolina House of Representatives 63rd district Republican primary election, 2022
Party	Candidate	Votes	%
Republican	Stephen Ross	2,182	49.83%
Republican	Ed Priola	2,027	46.29%
Republican	Peter Boykin	170	3.88%
Total votes		4,379	100%

North Carolina House of Representatives 63rd District general election, 2022
Party	Candidate	Votes	%
Republican	Stephen Ross	13,955	51.08%
Democratic	Ricky Hurtado (incumbent)	13,367	48.92%
Total votes		27,322	100%
Republican gain from Democratic			

==== District 64 ====
Incumbent Republican Dennis Riddell had represented the 64th District since 2013.

North Carolina House of Representatives 64th district general election, 2022
Party	Candidate	Votes	%
Republican	Dennis Riddell (incumbent)	20,320	62.55%
Democratic	Ron Osborne	12,168	37.45%
Total votes		32,488	100%
Republican hold			

==== District 65 ====
Incumbent Republican Reece Pyrtle had represented the 65th District since his appointment on August 11, 2021. He was running for re-election. Joseph A. Gibson III is challenging Pyrtle for the Republican nomination. Jay Donecker and Gary L. Smith are seeking the Democratic nomination.

North Carolina House of Representatives 65th district Democratic primary election, 2022
Party	Candidate	Votes	%
Democratic	Jay Donecker	2,183	69.32%
Democratic	Gary L. Smith	966	30.68%
Total votes		3,149	100%

North Carolina House of Representatives 65th district Republican primary election, 2022
Party	Candidate	Votes	%
Republican	Reece Pyrtle (incumbent)	5,813	79.86%
Republican	Joseph A. Gibson III	1,466	20.14%
Total votes		7,279	100%

North Carolina House of Representatives 65th district general election, 2022
Party	Candidate	Votes	%
Republican	Reece Pyrtle (incumbent)	21,740	67.16%
Democratic	Jay Donecker	10,632	32.84%
Total votes		32,372	100%
Republican hold			

==== District 66 ====
The new 66th District is based in north central Wake County and had no incumbent. State Senator Sarah Crawford won the Democratic nomination defeating Wesley Knott and Frank (Jeremiah) Pierce. Crawford easily won the general election.

North Carolina House of Representatives 66th district Democratic primary election, 2022
Party	Candidate	Votes	%
Democratic	Sarah Crawford	3,121	47.24%
Democratic	Wesley Knott	2,982	45.13%
Democratic	Frank "Jeremiah" Pierce	504	7.63%
Total votes		6,607	100%

North Carolina House of Representatives 66th district general election, 2022
Party	Candidate	Votes	%
Democratic	Sarah Crawford	18,606	70.13%
Republican	Ives Brizuela de Sholar	7,220	27.21%
Libertarian	Micao Penaflor	705	2.66%
Total votes		26,531	100%
Democratic win (new seat)			

==== District 67 ====
Incumbent Republican Wayne Sasser had represented the 67th District since 2019.

North Carolina House of Representatives 67th district general election, 2022
Party	Candidate	Votes	%
Republican	Wayne Sasser (incumbent)	26,654	100%
Total votes		26,654	100%
Republican hold			

==== District 68 ====
Incumbent Republican David Willis had represented the 68th District since 2021.

North Carolina House of Representatives 68th district general election, 2022
Party	Candidate	Votes	%
Republican	David Willis (incumbent)	24,883	100%
Total votes		24,883	100%
Republican hold			

==== District 69 ====
Incumbent Republican Dean Arp had represented the 69th District since 2013.

North Carolina House of Representatives 69th district general election, 2022
Party	Candidate	Votes	%
Republican	Dean Arp (incumbent)	22,418	66.59%
Democratic	Leigh Coulter	11,249	33.41%
Total votes		33,667	100%
Republican hold			

==== District 70 ====
Incumbent Republican Pat Hurley had represented the 70th District since 2007. Brian Biggs defeated Hurley for the Republican nomination.

North Carolina House of Representatives 70th district Republican primary election, 2022
Party	Candidate	Votes	%
Republican	Brian Biggs	5,213	52.27%
Republican	Pat Hurley (incumbent)	4,760	47.73%
Total votes		9,973	100%

North Carolina House of Representatives 70th district general election, 2022
Party	Candidate	Votes	%
Republican	Brian Biggs	22,160	79.01%
Democratic	Susan Lee "Susie" Scott	5,887	20.99%
Total votes		28,047	100%
Republican hold			

==== District 71 ====
Incumbent Democrat Evelyn Terry had represented the 71st District since 2013. She was retiring. Kanika Brown won the Democratic nomination, defeating David M. Moore and Frederick N. Terry. Brown was unopposed in the general election.

North Carolina House of Representatives 71st district Democratic primary election, 2022
Party	Candidate	Votes	%
Democratic	Kanika Brown	2,336	47.85%
Democratic	Frederick N. Terry	1,871	38.32%
Democratic	David M. Moore	675	13.83%
Total votes		4,882	100%

North Carolina House of Representatives 71st district general election, 2022
Party	Candidate	Votes	%
Democratic	Kanika Brown	18,196	100%
Total votes		18,196	100%
Democratic hold			

==== District 72 ====
Incumbent Democrat Amber Baker had represented the 72nd District since 2021.

North Carolina House of Representatives 72nd district general election, 2022
Party	Candidate	Votes	%
Democratic	Amber Baker (incumbent)	18,738	73.87%
Republican	Shelton Stallworthy	6,628	26.13%
Total votes		25,366	100%
Democratic hold			

==== District 73 ====
Results by precinct Staton-Williams: 50–60%; 60–70%; 70–80%; Echevarria: 50–60%; 60–70%

The new 73rd District includes portions of eastern Cabarrus County. The district includes the home of incumbent Republican Larry Pittman, who had represented the 83rd District and its predecessors since 2011. Prior to the completion of redistricting, Pittman announced that he would not seek re-election. Brian Echevarria won the Republican nomination, defeating then North Carolina Federation of Young Republicans Chairwoman and state Republican central committee member Catherine Whiteford and Parish Moffitt.

North Carolina House of Representatives 73rd district Republican primary election, 2022
Party	Candidate	Votes	%
Republican	Brian Echevarria	3,116	57.38%
Republican	Catherine Whiteford	1,224	22.54%
Republican	Parish Moffitt	1,090	20.07%
Total votes		5,430	100%

North Carolina House of Representatives 73rd district general election, 2022
Party	Candidate	Votes	%
Democratic	Diamond Staton-Williams	14,108	51.14%
Republican	Brian Echevarria	13,479	48.86%
Total votes		27,587	100%
Democratic gain from Republican			

==== District 74 ====
Incumbent Republican Jeff Zenger had represented the 74th District since 2021. Carla Catalan Day won the Democratic nomination, defeating Sean Lew.

North Carolina House of Representatives 74th district Democratic primary election, 2022
Party	Candidate	Votes	%
Democratic	Carla Catalan Day	3,474	68.52%
Democratic	Sean Lew	1,596	31.48%
Total votes		5,070	100%

North Carolina House of Representatives 74th district general election, 2022
Party	Candidate	Votes	%
Republican	Jeff Zenger (incumbent)	20,245	52.37%
Democratic	Carla Catalan Day	18,416	47.63%
Total votes		38,661	100%
Republican hold			

==== District 75 ====
Incumbent Republican Donny Lambeth had represented the 75th District since 2013.

North Carolina House of Representatives 75th district general election, 2022
Party	Candidate	Votes	%
Republican	Donny Lambeth (incumbent)	19,925	100%
Total votes		19,925	100%
Republican hold			

==== District 76 ====
Incumbent Republican Harry Warren had represented the 76th District and its predecessors since 2011.

North Carolina House of Representatives 76th district general election, 2022
Party	Candidate	Votes	%
Republican	Harry Warren (incumbent)	21,050	100%
Total votes		21,050	100%
Republican hold			

==== District 77 ====
The new 77th District includes the homes of incumbent Republicans Julia Craven Howard, who had represented the 77th District and its predecessors since 1989, and Lee Zachary, who had represented the 73rd District since 2015. Zachary unsuccessfully ran for the State Senate.

North Carolina House of Representatives 77th district general election, 2022
Party	Candidate	Votes	%
Republican	Julia Craven Howard (incumbent)	30,953	100%
Total votes		30,953	100%
Republican hold			

==== District 78 ====
Incumbent Republican Allen McNeill had represented the 78th District since 2012. He retired. Neal Jackson won the Republican nomination, defeating David Ashley and Cory Bortree.

North Carolina House of Representatives 78th district Republican primary election, 2022
Party	Candidate	Votes	%
Republican	Neal Jackson	8,449	67.06%
Republican	David Ashley	2,194	17.41%
Republican	Cory Bortree	1,956	15.53%
Total votes		12,599	100%

North Carolina House of Representatives 78th district general election, 2022
Party	Candidate	Votes	%
Republican	Neal Jackson	27,787	76.55%
Democratic	Erik Davis	8,510	23.45%
Total votes		36,297	100%
Republican hold			

==== District 79 ====
Incumbent Republican Keith Kidwell had represented the 79th District since 2019. Ed Hege unsuccessfully challenged Kidwell for the Republican nomination.

North Carolina House of Representatives 79th district Republican primary election, 2022
Party	Candidate	Votes	%
Republican	Keith Kidwell (incumbent)	8,721	83.30%
Republican	Ed Hege	1,749	16.70%
Total votes		10,470	100%

North Carolina House of Representatives 79th district general election, 2022
Party	Candidate	Votes	%
Republican	Keith Kidwell (incumbent)	26,309	100%
Total votes		26,309	100%
Republican hold			

=== Districts 80-99 ===
==== District 80 ====
Incumbent Republican Sam Watford had represented the 80th District since 2021.

North Carolina House of Representatives 80th district general election, 2022
Party	Candidate	Votes	%
Republican	Sam Watford (incumbent)	23,182	78.46%
Democratic	Dennis S. Miller	6,365	21.54%
Total votes		29,547	100%
Republican hold			

==== District 81 ====
Incumbent Republican Larry Potts had represented the 81st District since 2017.

North Carolina House of Representatives 81st district general election, 2022
Party	Candidate	Votes	%
Republican	Larry Potts (incumbent)	21,922	74.23%
Democratic	Joe Watkins	7,612	25.77%
Total votes		29,534	100%
Republican hold			

==== District 82 ====
Incumbent Republican Kristin Baker had represented the 82nd District since 2020.

North Carolina House of Representatives 82nd district general election, 2022
Party	Candidate	Votes	%
Republican	Kristin Baker (incumbent)	19,935	100%
Total votes		19,935	100%
Republican hold			

==== District 83 ====
The new 83rd District includes portions of eastern Cabarrus County and southern Rowan County and hds no incumbent. Kevin Crutchfield won the Republican nomination, defeating Grayson Haff and Brad Jenkins. Crutchfield was unopposed in the general election.

North Carolina House of Representatives 83rd district Republican primary election, 2022
Party	Candidate	Votes	%
Republican	Kevin Crutchfield	4,343	45.06%
Republican	Brad Jenkins	3,124	32.41%
Republican	Grayson Haff	2,171	22.53%
Total votes		9,638	100%

North Carolina House of Representatives 83rd district general election, 2022
Party	Candidate	Votes	%
Republican	Kevin Crutchfield	27,201	100%
Total votes		27,201	100%
Republican win (new seat)			

==== District 84 ====
Incumbent Republican Jeffrey McNeely had represented the 84th District since 2019.

North Carolina House of Representatives 84th district general election, 2022
Party	Candidate	Votes	%
Republican	Jeffrey McNeely (incumbent)	22,931	100%
Total votes		22,931	100%
Republican hold			

==== District 85 ====
Incumbent Republican Dudley Greene had represented the 85th District since 2021.

North Carolina House of Representatives 85th district general election, 2022
Party	Candidate	Votes	%
Republican	Dudley Greene (incumbent)	26,613	74.59%
Democratic	Robert Cordle	9,066	25.41%
Total votes		35,679	100%
Republican hold			

==== District 86 ====
Incumbent Republican Hugh Blackwell had represented the 86th District since 2009.

North Carolina House of Representatives 86th district general election, 2022
Party	Candidate	Votes	%
Republican	Hugh Blackwell (incumbent)	23,945	100%
Total votes		23,945	100%
Republican hold			

==== District 87 ====
Incumbent Republican Destin Hall had represented the 87th District since 2017.

North Carolina House of Representatives 87th district general election, 2022
Party	Candidate	Votes	%
Republican	Destin Hall (incumbent)	22,864	76.21%
Democratic	Barbara Kirby	7,139	23.79%
Total votes		30,003	100%
Republican hold			

==== District 88 ====
Incumbent Democrat Mary Belk had represented the 88th District since 2017.

North Carolina House of Representatives 88th district general election, 2022
Party	Candidate	Votes	%
Democratic	Mary Belk (incumbent)	19,020	69.27%
Republican	Anne Marie Peacock	8,438	30.73%
Total votes		27,458	100%
Democratic hold			

==== District 89 ====
Incumbent Republican Mitchell Setzer had represented the 89th District and its predecessors since 1999. Benjamin Devine and Kelli Weaver Moore unsuccessfully challenged Setzer for the Republican nomination.

North Carolina House of Representatives 89th district Republican primary election, 2022
Party	Candidate	Votes	%
Republican	Mitchell Setzer (incumbent)	5,516	57.19%
Republican	Kelli Weaver Moore	3,016	31.27%
Republican	Benjamin Devine	1,113	11.54%
Total votes		9,645	100%

North Carolina House of Representatives 89th district general election, 2022
Party	Candidate	Votes	%
Republican	Mitchell Setzer (incumbent)	27,255	100%
Total votes		27,255	100%
Republican hold			

==== District 90 ====
Incumbent Republican Sarah Stevens had represented the 90th District since 2009. Benjamin Romans unsuccessfully challenged Stevens for the Republican nomination.

North Carolina House of Representatives 90th district Republican primary election, 2022
Party	Candidate	Votes	%
Republican	Sarah Stevens (incumbent)	6,526	72.43%
Republican	Benjamin Romans	2,484	27.57%
Total votes		9,010	100%

North Carolina House of Representatives 90th district general election, 2022
Party	Candidate	Votes	%
Republican	Sarah Stevens (incumbent)	24,398	100%
Total votes		24,398	100%
Republican hold			

==== District 91 ====
Incumbent Republican Kyle Hall had represented the 91st District since 2015. James Douglas and Stephen L. James unsuccessfully challenged Hall for the Republican nomination.

North Carolina House of Representatives 91st district Republican primary election, 2022
Party	Candidate	Votes	%
Republican	Kyle Hall (incumbent)	7,761	82.99%
Republican	James Douglas	977	10.45%
Republican	Stephen L. James	614	6.57%
Total votes		9,352	100%

North Carolina House of Representatives 91st district general election, 2022
Party	Candidate	Votes	%
Republican	Kyle Hall (incumbent)	26,304	100%
Total votes		26,304	100%
Republican hold			

==== District 92 ====
Incumbent Democrat Terry Brown had represented the 92nd District since 2021.

North Carolina House of Representatives 92nd district general election, 2022
Party	Candidate	Votes	%
Democratic	Terry Brown (incumbent)	17,849	69.45%
Republican	Mario J. Robinson Sr.	7,851	30.55%
Total votes		25,700	100%
Democratic hold			

==== District 93 ====
Incumbent Republican Ray Pickett had represented the 93rd District since 2021. He was running for re-election.

North Carolina House of Representatives 93rd district general election, 2022
Party	Candidate	Votes	%
Republican	Ray Pickett (incumbent)	21,613	58.40%
Democratic	Ben Massey	15,396	41.60%
Total votes		37,009	100%
Republican hold			

==== District 94 ====
Incumbent Republican Jeffrey Elmore had represented the 94th District since 2013.

North Carolina House of Representatives 94th district general election, 2022
Party	Candidate	Votes	%
Republican	Jeffrey Elmore (incumbent)	27,924	80.07%
Democratic	Chuck Hubbard	6,952	19.93%
Total votes		34,876	100%
Republican hold			

==== District 95 ====
Incumbent Republican Grey Mills had represented the 95th District since 2021.

North Carolina House of Representatives 95th district general election, 2022
Party	Candidate	Votes	%
Republican	Grey Mills (incumbent)	22,524	67.48%
Democratic	Amanda B. Kotis	10,854	32.52%
Total votes		33,378	100%
Republican hold			

==== District 96 ====
Incumbent Republican Jay Adams had represented the 96th District since 2015.

North Carolina House of Representatives 96th district general election, 2022
Party	Candidate	Votes	%
Republican	Jay Adams (incumbent)	22,016	100%
Total votes		22,016	100%
Republican hold			

==== District 97 ====
Incumbent Republican Jason Saine had represented the 97th District since 2011.

North Carolina House of Representatives 97th district general election, 2022
Party	Candidate	Votes	%
Republican	Jason Saine (incumbent)	28,875	100%
Total votes		28,875	100%
Republican hold			

==== District 98 ====
Incumbent Republican John Bradford had represented the 98th District since 2021.

North Carolina House of Representatives 98th district general election, 2022
Party	Candidate	Votes	%
Republican	John Bradford (incumbent)	18,080	50.93%
Democratic	Christy Clark	17,420	49.07%
Total votes		35,500	100%
Republican hold			

==== District 99 ====
Incumbent Democrat Nasif Majeed had represented the 99th District since 2019.

North Carolina House of Representatives 99th district general election, 2022
Party	Candidate	Votes	%
Democratic	Nasif Majeed (incumbent)	13,364	82.54%
Republican	Michael Anderson	2,826	17.46%
Total votes		16,190	100%
Democratic hold			

=== Districts 100-120 ===
==== District 100 ====
Incumbent Democrat John Autry had represented the 100th District since 2017.

North Carolina House of Representatives 100th district general election, 2022
Party	Candidate	Votes	%
Democratic	John Autry (incumbent)	15,219	100%
Total votes		15,219	100%
Democratic hold			

==== District 101 ====
Incumbent Democrat Carolyn Logan had represented the 101st District since 2019.

North Carolina House of Representatives 101st district general election, 2022
Party	Candidate	Votes	%
Democratic	Carolyn Logan (incumbent)	16,035	74.89%
Republican	Steve Mauney	5,377	25.11%
Total votes		21,412	100%
Democratic hold			

==== District 102 ====
Incumbent Democrat Becky Carney had represented the 102nd District since 2003.

North Carolina House of Representatives 102nd district general election, 2022
Party	Candidate	Votes	%
Democratic	Becky Carney (incumbent)	22,795	81.70%
Republican	Cynthia Eleanor Clementi	5,107	18.30%
Total votes		27,902	100%
Democratic hold			

==== District 103 ====
Incumbent Democrat Rachel Hunt had represented the 103rd District since 2019. Hunt was retiring to run for the State Senate. Former representative Bill Brawley sought the Republican nomination. Laura Budd won the Democratic nomination, defeating Ann Harlan. Budd defeated Brawley in the general election.

North Carolina House of Representatives 103rd district general election, 2022
Party	Candidate	Votes	%
Democratic	Laura Budd	20,200	52.48%
Republican	Bill Brawley	18,294	47.52%
Total votes		38,494	100%
Democratic hold			

==== District 104 ====
Incumbent Democrat Brandon Lofton had represented the 104th District since 2019.

North Carolina House of Representatives 104th district general election, 2022
Party	Candidate	Votes	%
Democratic	Brandon Lofton (incumbent)	21,084	55.27%
Republican	Don Pomeroy	17,061	44.73%
Total votes		38,145	100%
Democratic hold			

==== District 105 ====
Incumbent Democrat Wesley Harris had represented the 105th District since 2019.

North Carolina House of Representatives 105th district general election, 2022
Party	Candidate	Votes	%
Democratic	Wesley Harris (incumbent)	17,545	56.87%
Republican	Joshua Niday	13,307	43.13%
Total votes		30,852	100%
Democratic hold			

==== District 106 ====
Incumbent Democrat Carla Cunningham had represented the 106th District since 2013.

North Carolina House of Representatives 106th district general election, 2022
Party	Candidate	Votes	%
Democratic	Carla Cunningham (incumbent)	20,559	70.14%
Republican	Karen Henning	8,751	29.86%
Total votes		29,310	100%
Democratic hold			

==== District 107 ====
Incumbent Democrat Kelly Alexander had represented the 107th District since 2009. Vermanno Bowman unsuccessfully challenged Alexander for the Democratic nomination.

North Carolina House of Representatives 107th district general election, 2022
Party	Candidate	Votes	%
Democratic	Kelly Alexander (incumbent)	18,896	81.86%
Republican	Mark Alan Cook	4,187	18.14%
Total votes		23,083	100%
Democratic hold			

==== District 108 ====
Incumbent Republican John Torbett had represented the 108th District since 2011.

North Carolina House of Representatives 108th district general election, 2022
Party	Candidate	Votes	%
Republican	John Torbett (incumbent)	19,759	100%
Total votes		19,759	100%
Republican hold			

==== District 109 ====
Incumbent Republican Donnie Loftis had represented the 109th District since his appointment on November 1, 2021. Lauren Bumgardner Current, John Gouch, and Ronnie Worley unsuccessfully challenged Loftis for the Republican nomination.

North Carolina House of Representatives 109th district Republican primary election, 2022
Party	Candidate	Votes	%
Republican	Donnie Loftis (incumbent)	2,649	33.69%
Republican	John Gouch	1,814	23.07%
Republican	Ronnie Worley	1,742	22.15%
Republican	Lauren Bumgardner Current	1,658	21.09%
Total votes		7,863	100%

North Carolina House of Representatives 109th district general election, 2022
Party	Candidate	Votes	%
Republican	Donnie Loftis (incumbent)	18,785	60.80%
Democratic	Eric Hughes	12,112	39.20%
Total votes		30,897	100%
Republican hold			

==== District 110 ====
Incumbent Republican Kelly Hastings had represented the 110th District since 2011.

North Carolina House of Representatives 110th district general election, 2022
Party	Candidate	Votes	%
Republican	Kelly Hastings (incumbent)	20,551	100%
Total votes		20,551	100%
Republican hold			

==== District 111 ====
Incumbent Republican Speaker of the House Tim Moore had represented the 111th District since 2003.

North Carolina House of Representatives 110th district general election, 2022
Party	Candidate	Votes	%
Republican	Tim Moore (incumbent)	23,333	100%
Total votes		23,333	100%
Republican hold			

==== District 112 ====
HD112 results by precinct

The new 112th District is based in eastern Mecklenburg County and had no incumbent. Former representative Tricia Cotham won the Democratic nomination, defeating Jay Holman, Yolanda Holmes, and former representative Rodney Moore. Cotham won the general election.

North Carolina House of Representatives 112th district Democratic primary election, 2022
Party	Candidate	Votes	%
Democratic	Tricia Cotham	2,385	47.81%
Democratic	Yolanda Holmes	1,559	31.25%
Democratic	Jay Holman	853	17.10%
Democratic	Rodney Moore	192	3.85%
Total votes		4,989	100%

North Carolina House of Representatives 112th district general election, 2022
Party	Candidate	Votes	%
Democratic	Tricia Cotham	15,389	59.22%
Republican	Tony Long	10,597	40.78%
Total votes		25,986	100%
Democratic win (new seat)			

==== District 113 ====
The new 113th District includes the homes of incumbent Republicans Jake Johnson, who had represented the 113th District since 2019, and David Rogers, who had represented the 112th District since 2016. Both Rogers and Johnson were seeking re-election.

North Carolina House of Representatives 113th district Republican primary election, 2022
Party	Candidate	Votes	%
Republican	Jake Johnson (incumbent)	7,585	65.08%
Republican	David Rogers (incumbent)	4,069	34.92%
Total votes		11,654	100%

North Carolina House of Representatives 113th district general election, 2022
Party	Candidate	Votes	%
Republican	Jake Johnson (incumbent)	27,267	100%
Total votes		27,267	100%
Republican hold			

==== District 114 ====
The new 114th District includes the home of incumbent Democrat John Ager, who hds represented the 115th District since 2015. Ager did not seek re-election.

North Carolina House of Representatives 114th district general election, 2022
Party	Candidate	Votes	%
Democratic	Eric Ager	28,999	68.76%
Republican	Everett D. Pittillo	13,177	31.24%
Total votes		42,176	100%
Democratic hold			

==== District 115 ====
The new 115th District includes the home of incumbent Democrat Brian Turner, who had represented the 116th District since 2015. Turner did not seek re-election. Pratik Bhakta won the Republican nomination, defeating Sherry M. Higgins.

North Carolina House of Representatives 115th district Republican primary election, 2022
Party	Candidate	Votes	%
Republican	Pratik Bhakta	3,146	50.01%
Republican	Sherry M. Higgins	3,145	49.99%
Total votes		6,291	100%

North Carolina House of Representatives 115th district general election, 2022
Party	Candidate	Votes	%
Democratic	Lindsey Prather	21,007	57.57%
Republican	Pratik Bhakta	15,481	42.43%
Total votes		36,488	100%
Democratic hold			

==== District 116 ====
The new 116th District includes the home of incumbent Democrat Caleb Rudow, who had represented the 114th District since 2022.

North Carolina House of Representatives 116th district general election, 2022
Party	Candidate	Votes	%
Democratic	Caleb Rudow (incumbent)	25,161	62.36%
Republican	Mollie Rose	15,185	37.64%
Total votes		40,346	100%
Democratic hold			

==== District 117 ====
Incumbent Republican Tim Moffitt had represented the 117th District since 2020. Moffitt was retiring to run for the State Senate. Jennifer Capps Balkcom won the Republican nomination, defeating Dennis Justice and Chelsea Walsh.

North Carolina House of Representatives 117th district Republican primary election, 2022
Party	Candidate	Votes	%
Republican	Jennifer Capps Balkcom	5,599	42.58%
Republican	Chelsea Walsh	5,441	41.38%
Republican	Dennis Justice	2,110	16.05%
Total votes		13,150	100%

North Carolina House of Representatives 117th district general election, 2022
Party	Candidate	Votes	%
Republican	Jennifer Capps Balkcom	24,144	58.96%
Democratic	Michael Greer O'Shea	16,806	41.04%
Total votes		40,950	100%
Republican hold			

==== District 118 ====
Incumbent Republican Mark Pless had represented the 118th District since 2021.

North Carolina House of Representatives 118th district general election, 2022
Party	Candidate	Votes	%
Republican	Mark Pless (incumbent)	22,040	60.28%
Democratic	Josh Remillard	14,522	39.72%
Total votes		36,562	100%
Republican hold			

==== District 119 ====
Incumbent Republican Mike Clampitt had represented the 119th District since 2021.

North Carolina House of Representatives 119th district general election, 2022
Party	Candidate	Votes	%
Republican	Mike Clampitt (incumbent)	19,332	53.90%
Democratic	Al Platt	16,534	46.10%
Total votes		35,866	100%
Republican hold			

==== District 120 ====
Incumbent Republican Karl Gillespie had represented the 120th District since 2021. He was running for re-election.

North Carolina House of Representatives 120th district general election, 2022
Party	Candidate	Votes	%
Republican	Karl Gillespie (incumbent)	30,037	100%
Total votes		30,037	100%
Republican hold			

== See also ==
- List of North Carolina state legislatures
