= North Carolina's 73rd House district =

American legislative district

North Carolina's 73rd State House of Representatives district
Representative
Jonathan Almond; R–Concord
- Demographics: 55% White; 21% Black; 17% Hispanic; 2% Asian; 1% Other; 4% Multiracial
- Population (2024): 93,991

North Carolina's 73rd House district is one of 120 districts in the North Carolina House of Representatives. It has been represented by Republican Jonathan Almond since 2025.

== Geography ==
Since 2023, the district has included part of Cabarrus County. The district overlaps with the 34th Senate district.

== District officeholders ==
Representative	Party	Dates	Notes	Counties
District created January 1, 1993.
Peggy Wilson (Madison)	Republican	January 1, 1993 – July 5, 1993	Redistricted from the 25th district. Resigned.	1993–2003; Parts of Rockingham and Forsyth counties.
Vacant		July 5, 1993 – July 12, 1993		1993–2003; Parts of Rockingham and Forsyth counties.
Wayne Sexton (Stoneville)	Republican	July 12, 1993 – January 1, 2003	Appointed to finish Wilson's term Redistricted to the 66th district.	1993–2003; Parts of Rockingham and Forsyth counties.
Curtis Blackwood (Matthews)	Republican	January 1, 2003 – January 1, 2005	Redistricted to the 68th district.	2003–2005; Part of Union County.
Larry Brown (Kernersville)	Republican	January 1, 2005 – August 16, 2012	Redistricted to the 74th district and lost re-nomination. Died.	2005–2013; Parts of Forsyth and Davidson counties.
Vacant		August 16, 2012 – October 10, 2012		2005–2013; Parts of Forsyth and Davidson counties.
Joyce Krawiec (Kernersville)	Republican	October 10, 2012 – January 1, 2013	Appointed to finish Brown's term. Redistricted to the 74th district and retired.	2005–2013; Parts of Forsyth and Davidson counties.
Mark Hollo (Taylorsville)	Republican	January 1, 2013 – January 1, 2015	Redistricted from the 88th district. Retired.	2013–2019; All of Alexander and Yadkin counties. Part of Wilkes County.
Lee Zachary (Yadkinville)	Republican	January 1, 2015 – January 1, 2023	Redistricted to the 77th district and retired to run for State Senate.	2013–2019; All of Alexander and Yadkin counties. Part of Wilkes County.
Lee Zachary (Yadkinville)	Republican	January 1, 2015 – January 1, 2023	Redistricted to the 77th district and retired to run for State Senate.	2019–2023; All of Yadkin County; Part of Forsyth County.
Diamond Staton-Williams (Harrisburg)	Democratic	January 1, 2023 – January 1, 2025	Lost re-election.	2023–Present; Part of Cabarrus County.
Jonathan Almond (Concord)	Republican	January 1, 2025 – Present		2023–Present; Part of Cabarrus County.

== Election results ==
=== 2024 ===
North Carolina House of Representatives 73rd district Republican primary election, 2024
Party	Candidate	Votes	%
Republican	Jonathan Almond	4,526	53.46%
Republican	Holly Edwards	3,940	46.54%
Total votes		8,466	100%

North Carolina House of Representatives 73rd district general election, 2024
Party	Candidate	Votes	%
Republican	Jonathan Almond	23,400	53.21%
Democratic	Diamond Staton-Williams (incumbent)	20,577	46.79%
Total votes		43,977	100%
Republican gain from Democratic			

=== 2022 ===
North Carolina House of Representatives 73rd district Republican primary election, 2022
Party	Candidate	Votes	%
Republican	Brian Echevarria	3,116	57.38%
Republican	Catherine Whiteford	1,224	22.54%
Republican	Parish Moffitt	1,090	20.07%
Total votes		5,430	100%

North Carolina House of Representatives 73rd district general election, 2022
Party	Candidate	Votes	%
Democratic	Diamond Staton-Williams	14,108	51.14%
Republican	Brian Echevarria	13,479	48.86%
Total votes		27,587	100%
Democratic gain from Republican			

=== 2020 ===
North Carolina House of Representatives 73rd district general election, 2020
Party	Candidate	Votes	%
Republican	Lee Zachary (incumbent)	24,703	64.54%
Democratic	William Stinson	13,570	35.46%
Total votes		38,273	100%
Republican hold			

=== 2018 ===
North Carolina House of Representatives 73rd district general election, 2018
Party	Candidate	Votes	%
Republican	Lee Zachary (incumbent)	19,763	64.10%
Democratic	William Stinson	11,070	35.90%
Total votes		30,833	100%
Republican hold			

=== 2016 ===
North Carolina House of Representatives 73rd district Republican primary election, 2016
Party	Candidate	Votes	%
Republican	Lee Zachary (incumbent)	6,794	51.47%
Republican	Dwight Shook	6,406	48.53%
Total votes		13,200	100%

North Carolina House of Representatives 73rd district general election, 2016
Party	Candidate	Votes	%
Republican	Lee Zachary (incumbent)	30,354	100%
Total votes		30,354	100%
Republican hold			

=== 2014 ===
North Carolina House of Representatives 73rd district Republican primary election, 2014
Party	Candidate	Votes	%
Republican	Lee Zachary	5,729	64.23%
Republican	Dwight Shook	3,190	35.77%
Total votes		8,919	100%

North Carolina House of Representatives 73rd district general election, 2014
Party	Candidate	Votes	%
Republican	Lee Zachary	19,650	100%
Total votes		19,650	100%
Republican hold			

=== 2012 ===
North Carolina House of Representatives 73rd district Republican primary election, 2012
Party	Candidate	Votes	%
Republican	Mark Hollo (incumbent)	9,070	67.60%
Republican	Darrell McCormick (incumbent)	4,347	32.40%
Total votes		13,417	100%

North Carolina House of Representatives 73rd district general election, 2012
Party	Candidate	Votes	%
Republican	Mark Hollo (incumbent)	24,076	71.37%
Democratic	William Stinson	9,659	28.63%
Total votes		33,735	100%
Republican hold			

=== 2010 ===
North Carolina House of Representatives 73rd district general election, 2010
Party	Candidate	Votes	%
Republican	Larry Brown (incumbent)	17,675	100%
Total votes		17,675	100%
Republican hold			

=== 2008 ===
North Carolina House of Representatives 73rd district general election, 2008
Party	Candidate	Votes	%
Republican	Larry Brown (incumbent)	26,636	83.80%
Libertarian	Cary Morris	5,151	16.20%
Total votes		31,787	100%
Republican hold			

=== 2006 ===
North Carolina House of Representatives 73rd district general election, 2006
Party	Candidate	Votes	%
Republican	Larry Brown (incumbent)	11,432	100%
Total votes		11,432	100%
Republican hold			

=== 2004 ===
North Carolina House of Representatives 73rd district Republican primary election, 2004
Party	Candidate	Votes	%
Republican	Larry Brown	4,250	77.03%
Republican	Michael Decker (incumbent)	1,267	22.97%
Total votes		5,517	100%

North Carolina House of Representatives 73rd district general election, 2004
Party	Candidate	Votes	%
Republican	Larry Brown	23,966	86.46%
Libertarian	Michael Smith	3,754	13.54%
Total votes		27,720	100%
Republican hold			

=== 2002 ===
North Carolina House of Representatives 73rd district Republican primary election, 2002
Party	Candidate	Votes	%
Republican	Curtis Blackwood	2,637	41.48%
Republican	Ed Howie	2,282	35.90%
Republican	Leroy Pittman	1,438	22.62%
Total votes		6,357	100%

North Carolina House of Representatives 73rd district general election, 2002
Party	Candidate	Votes	%
Republican	Curtis Blackwood	17,477	100%
Total votes		17,477	100%
Republican win (new seat)			

=== 2000 ===
North Carolina House of Representatives 73rd district general election, 2000
Party	Candidate	Votes	%
Republican	Wayne Sexton (incumbent)	14,100	66.60%
Democratic	Michael Adamson	7,072	33.40%
Total votes		21,172	100%
Republican hold			
