= Debra Conrad =

American politician from North Carolina

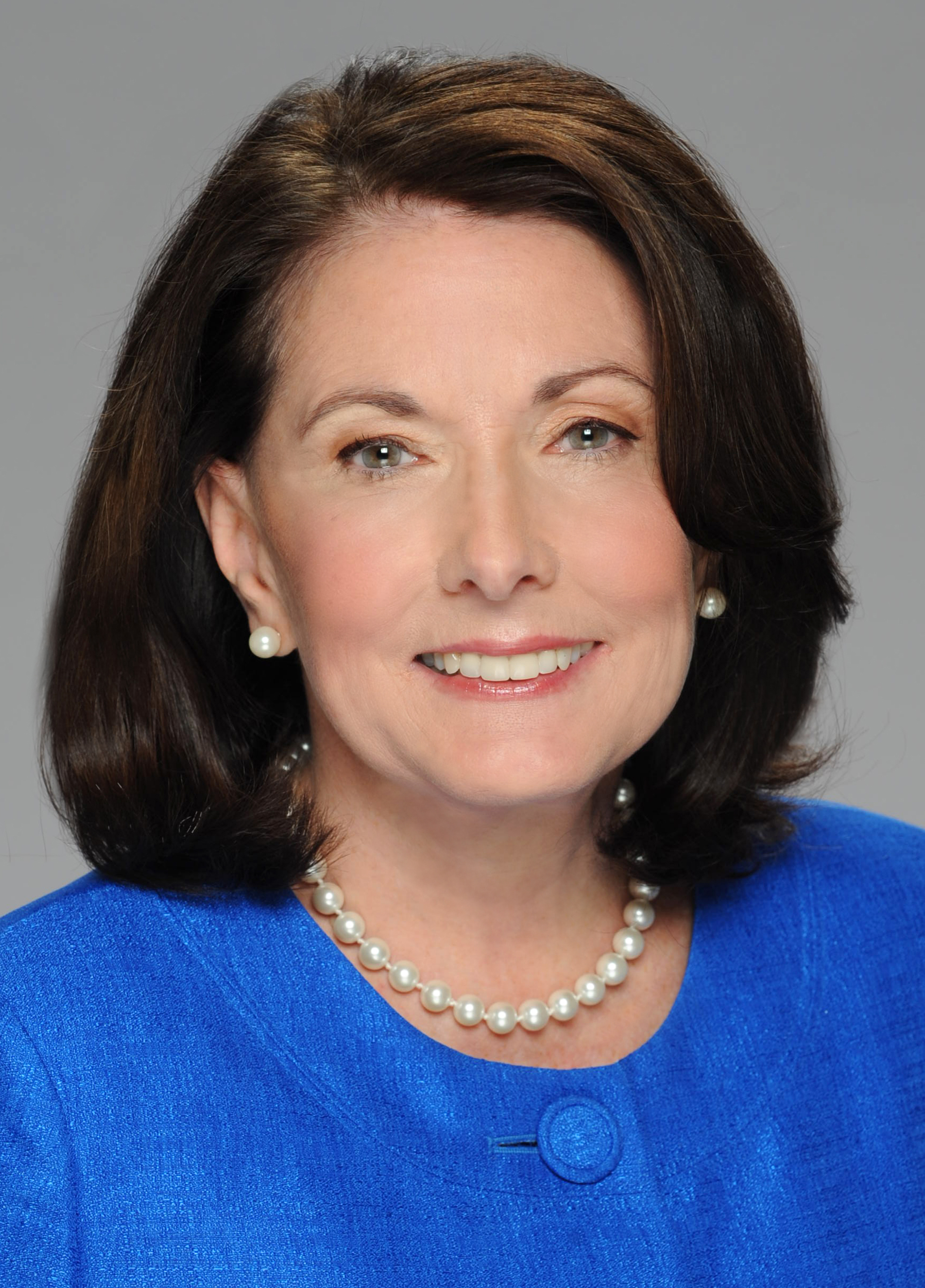

Member of the North Carolina House of Representatives from the 74th district
- In office January 1, 2013 – January 1, 2021
- Preceded by: Dale Folwell
- Succeeded by: Wes Schollander

Personal details
- Born: November 19, 1951 (age 74) Forsyth County, North Carolina
- Party: Republican

Debra Conrad (born November 19, 1951) is an American politician who served in the North Carolina House of Representatives from the 74th district from 2013 to 2021.

== Electoral history ==
=== 2018 ===
North Carolina House of Representatives 74th district general election, 2018
Party	Candidate	Votes	%
Republican	Debra Conrad (incumbent)	19,423	54.51%
Democratic	Terri Elizabeth LeGrand	16,212	45.49%
Total votes		35,635	100%
Republican hold			

=== 2016 ===
North Carolina House of Representatives 74th district general election, 2016
Party	Candidate	Votes	%
Republican	Debra Conrad (incumbent)	27,209	63.52%
Democratic	Marilynn Baker	15,626	36.48%
Total votes		42,835	100%
Republican hold			

=== 2014 ===
North Carolina House of Representatives 74th district general election, 2014
Party	Candidate	Votes	%
Republican	Debra Conrad (incumbent)	17,654	63.04%
Democratic	Mary Dickinson	10,351	36.96%
Total votes		28,005	100%
Republican hold			

=== 2012 ===
North Carolina House of Representatives 74th district Republican primary election, 2012
Party	Candidate	Votes	%
Republican	Debra Conrad	4,679	42.77%
Republican	Larry Brown (incumbent)	3,197	29.22%
Republican	Glenn L. Cobb	3,065	28.01%
Total votes		10,941	100%

North Carolina House of Representatives 74th district general election, 2012
Party	Candidate	Votes	%
Republican	Debra Conrad	26,616	64.36%
Democratic	David W. Moore	14,742	35.64%
Total votes		41,358	100%
Republican hold			

North Carolina House of Representatives
Preceded by Dale Folwell	Member of the North Carolina House of Representatives from the 74th district 2013-2020	Succeeded by Wes Schollander
