= North Carolina's 17th House district =

American legislative district

North Carolina's 17th State House of Representatives district
Representative
Frank Iler; R–Shallotte
- Demographics: 77% White; 11% Black; 7% Hispanic; 1% Asian; 1% Other; 4% Multiracial
- Population (2024): 102,889

North Carolina's 17th House district is one of 120 districts in the North Carolina House of Representatives. It has been represented by Republican Frank Iler since 2009.

== Geography ==
Since 2005, the district has included part of Brunswick County. The district overlaps with the 8th Senate district.

== District officeholders ==
=== Multi-member district ===
Representative	Party	Dates	Notes	Representative	Party	Dates	Notes	Counties
District created January 1, 1967.
James Ramsey (Roxboro)	Democratic	January 1, 1967 – January 1, 1973	Redistricted from the Person County district. Redistricted to the 13th district.	John Gunn (Yanceyville)	Democratic	January 1, 1967 – January 1, 1969	Redistricted from the Caswell County district.	1967–1973; All of Caswell, Person, and Granville counties.
James Ramsey (Roxboro)	Democratic	January 1, 1967 – January 1, 1973	Redistricted from the Person County district. Redistricted to the 13th district.	William Watkins (Oxford)	Democratic	January 1, 1969 – January 1, 1973	Redistricted to the 13th district.	1967–1973; All of Caswell, Person, and Granville counties.
Edward Holmes (Pittsboro)	Democratic	January 1, 1973 – January 1, 1981		Patricia Stanford Hunt (Chapel Hill)	Democratic	January 1, 1973 – January 1, 1983		1973–1983; All of Chatham and Orange counties.
Joe Hackney (Chapel Hill)	Democratic	January 1, 1981 – January 1, 1983	Redistricted to the 24th district.	Patricia Stanford Hunt (Chapel Hill)	Democratic	January 1, 1973 – January 1, 1983		1973–1983; All of Chatham and Orange counties.
Luther Jeralds (Fayetteville)	Democratic	January 1, 1983 – January 1, 1993	Retired.	C. R. Edwards (Fayetteville)	Democratic	January 1, 1983 – January 1, 1991		1983–2003; Part of Cumberland County.
Luther Jeralds (Fayetteville)	Democratic	January 1, 1983 – January 1, 1993	Retired.	Mary McAllister (Fayetteville)	Democratic	January 1, 1991 – January 1, 2003	Redistricted to the 43rd district.	1983–2003; Part of Cumberland County.
Theodore Kinney (Fayetteville)	Democratic	January 1, 1993 – January 1, 1995		Mary McAllister (Fayetteville)	Democratic	January 1, 1991 – January 1, 2003	Redistricted to the 43rd district.	1983–2003; Part of Cumberland County.
Larry Shaw (Fayetteville)	Democratic	January 1, 1995 – January 1, 1997	Retired to run for State Senate.	Mary McAllister (Fayetteville)	Democratic	January 1, 1991 – January 1, 2003	Redistricted to the 43rd district.	1983–2003; Part of Cumberland County.
Theodore Kinney (Fayetteville)	Democratic	January 1, 1997 – January 1, 2001	Lost re-nomination.	Mary McAllister (Fayetteville)	Democratic	January 1, 1991 – January 1, 2003	Redistricted to the 43rd district.	1983–2003; Part of Cumberland County.
Marvin Lucas (Spring Lake)	Democratic	January 1, 2001 – January 1, 2003	Redistricted to the 42nd district.	Mary McAllister (Fayetteville)	Democratic	January 1, 1991 – January 1, 2003	Redistricted to the 43rd district.	1983–2003; Part of Cumberland County.

=== Single-member district ===
Representative	Party	Dates	Notes	Counties
Bonner Stiller (Oak Island)	Republican	January 1, 2003 – June 15, 2009	Resigned.	2003–2005; Parts of Brunswick and New Hanover counties.
Bonner Stiller (Oak Island)	Republican	January 1, 2003 – June 15, 2009	Resigned.	2005–Present; Part of Brunswick County.
Vacant		June 15, 2009 – June 18, 2009		2005–Present; Part of Brunswick County.
Frank Iler (Shallotte)	Republican	June 18, 2009 – Present	Appointed to finish Stiller's term.	2005–Present; Part of Brunswick County.

== Election results ==
=== 2026 ===
North Carolina House of Representatives 17th district Republican primary election, 2026
Party	Candidate	Votes	%
Republican	Frank Iler (incumbent)	8,385	74.38%
Republican	Nia Moore	2,888	25.62%
Total votes		11,273	100%

North Carolina House of Representatives 17th district general election, 2026
Party	Candidate	Votes	%
Republican	Frank Iler (incumbent)		
Democratic	Dennis Breen		
Total votes			100%

=== 2024 ===
North Carolina House of Representatives 17th district general election, 2024
Party	Candidate	Votes	%
Republican	Frank Iler (incumbent)	42,078	62.27%
Democratic	Charles Jones	25,491	37.73%
Total votes		67,569	100%
Republican hold			

=== 2022 ===
North Carolina House of Representatives 17th district Democratic primary election, 2022
Party	Candidate	Votes	%
Democratic	Eric Terashima	2,968	70.75%
Democratic	Edward M. McKeithan	1,227	29.25%
Total votes		4,195	100%

North Carolina House of Representatives 17th district general election, 2022
Party	Candidate	Votes	%
Republican	Frank Iler (incumbent)	28,012	62.29%
Democratic	Eric Terashima	16,960	37.71%
Total votes		44,972	100%
Republican hold			

=== 2020 ===
North Carolina House of Representatives 17th district general election, 2020
Party	Candidate	Votes	%
Republican	Frank Iler (incumbent)	36,800	62.44%
Democratic	Tom Simmons	22,140	37.56%
Total votes		58,940	100%
Republican hold			

=== 2018 ===
North Carolina House of Representatives 17th district Republican primary election, 2018
Party	Candidate	Votes	%
Republican	Frank Iler (incumbent)	3,170	61.13%
Republican	Patricia "Pat" Sykes	2,016	38.87%
Total votes		5,186	100%

North Carolina House of Representatives 17th district general election, 2018
Party	Candidate	Votes	%
Republican	Frank Iler (incumbent)	28,930	63.48%
Democratic	Tom Simmons	16,642	36.52%
Total votes		45,572	100%
Republican hold			

=== 2016 ===
North Carolina House of Representatives 17th district Republican primary election, 2016
Party	Candidate	Votes	%
Republican	Frank Iler (incumbent)	10,129	67.64%
Republican	Marion D. Davis	4,846	32.36%
Total votes		14,975	100%

North Carolina House of representatives 17th district general election, 2016
Party	Candidate	Votes	%
Republican	Frank Iler (incumbent)	32,757	66.44%
Democratic	Charles Warren	16,549	33.56%
Total votes		49,306	100%
Republican hold			

=== 2014 ===
North Carolina House of Representatives 17th district Republican primary election, 2014
Party	Candidate	Votes	%
Republican	Frank Iler (incumbent)	5,493	69.64%
Republican	Marion Davis	2,395	30.36%
Total votes		7,888	100%

North Carolina House of representatives 17th district general election, 2014
Party	Candidate	Votes	%
Republican	Frank Iler (incumbent)	20,945	67.14%
Democratic	Charles Warren	10,251	32.86%
Total votes		31,196	100%
Republican hold			

=== 2012 ===
North Carolina House of representatives 17th district general election, 2012
Party	Candidate	Votes	%
Republican	Frank Iler (incumbent)	27,578	66.16%
Democratic	Lundia Washington	14,107	33.84%
Total votes		41,685	100%
Republican hold			

=== 2010 ===
North Carolina House of Representatives 17th district Democratic primary election, 2010
Party	Candidate	Votes	%
Democratic	James A. Knox	2,089	57.95%
Democratic	Leonard Jenkins	1,516	42.05%
Total votes		3,605	100%

North Carolina House of Representatives 17th district Republican primary election, 2010
Party	Candidate	Votes	%
Republican	Frank Iler (incumbent)	6,131	74.43%
Republican	Mac Tyson	2,106	25.57%
Total votes		8,237	100%

North Carolina House of representatives 17th district general election, 2010
Party	Candidate	Votes	%
Republican	Frank Iler (incumbent)	24,065	68.35%
Democratic	James A. Knox	11,146	31.65%
Total votes		35,211	100%
Republican hold			

=== 2008 ===
North Carolina House of representatives 17th district general election, 2008
Party	Candidate	Votes	%
Republican	Bonner Stiller (incumbent)	28,009	61.97%
Democratic	Vernon Ward	17,186	38.03%
Total votes		45,195	100%
Republican hold			

=== 2006 ===
North Carolina House of representatives 17th district general election, 2006
Party	Candidate	Votes	%
Republican	Bonner Stiller (incumbent)	14,619	62.32%
Democratic	Allan Dameron	8,838	37.68%
Total votes		23,457	100%
Republican hold			

=== 2004 ===
North Carolina House of representatives 17th district general election, 2004
Party	Candidate	Votes	%
Republican	Bonner Stiller (incumbent)	16,745	49.86%
Democratic	David Redwine	16,288	48.50%
Libertarian	Edward Gore	550	1.64%
Total votes		33,583	100%
Republican hold			

=== 2002 ===
North Carolina House of Representatives 17th district general election, 2002
Party	Candidate	Votes	%
Republican	Bonner Stiller	10,902	49.31%
Democratic	David Redwine (incumbent)	10,733	48.54%
Libertarian	Robert Kerr	476	2.15%
Total votes		22,111	100%
Republican gain from Democratic			

=== 2000 ===
North Carolina House of Representatives 17th district Democratic primary election, 2000
Party	Candidate	Votes	%
Democratic	Mary McAllister (incumbent)	3,472	38.56%
Democratic	Marvin Lucas	2,441	27.11%
Democratic	Theodore Kinney (incumbent)	1,718	19.08%
Democratic	David K. Hasan	1,374	15.26%
Total votes		9,005	100%

North Carolina House of Representatives 17th district general election, 2000
Party	Candidate	Votes	%
Democratic	Marvin Lucas	12,520	42.05%
Democratic	Mary McAllister (incumbent)	12,141	40.77%
Republican	George E. Boggs	5,115	17.18%
Total votes		29,776	100%
Democratic hold			
Democratic hold			
