= Jonathan Almond =

American politician

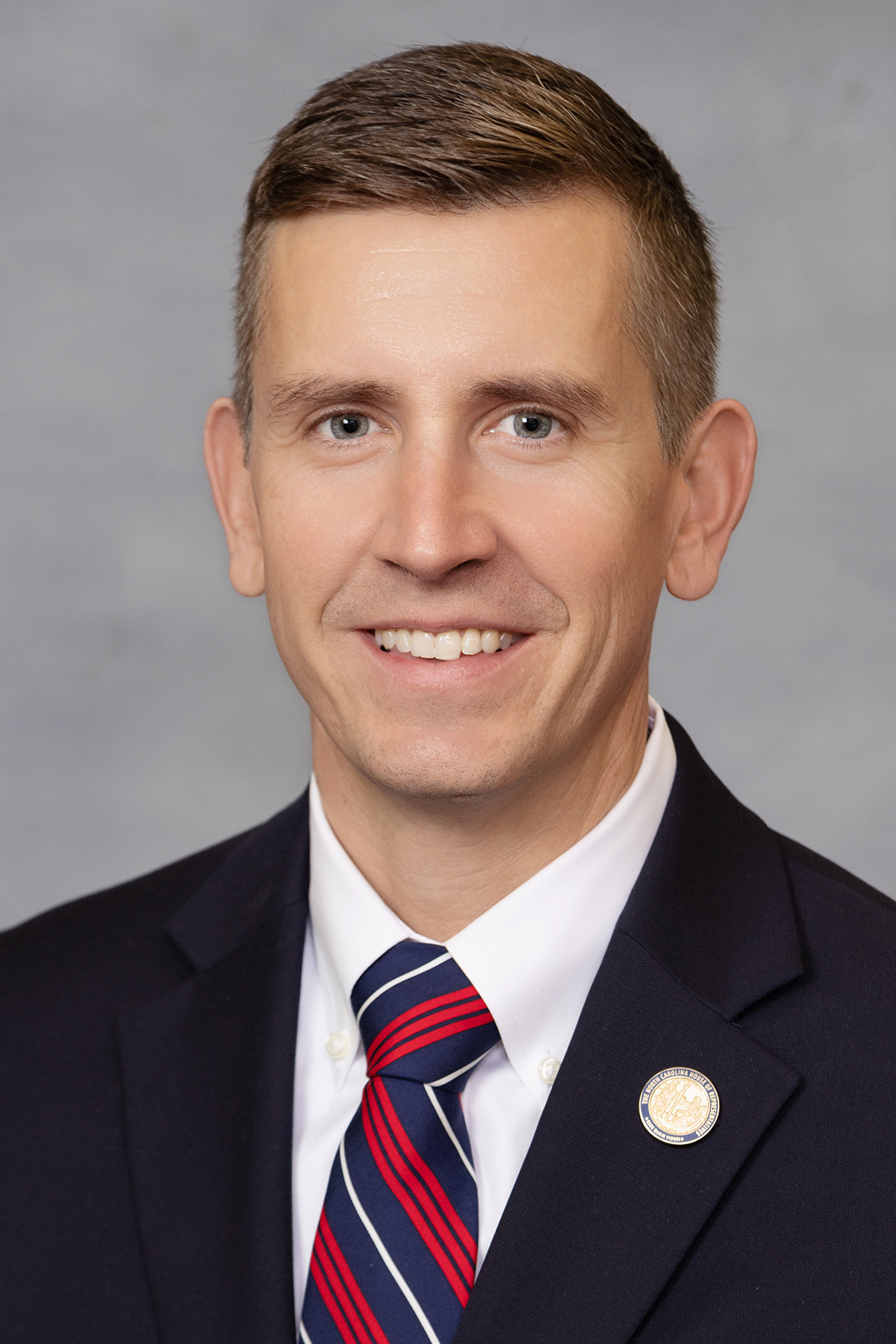

Member of the North Carolina House of Representatives from the 73rd district
- Incumbent
- Assumed office January 1, 2025
- Preceded by: Diamond Staton-Williams

Personal details
- Party: Republican
- Website: jonathanalmond.com

Jonathan L. Almond is a Republican member of the North Carolina House of Representatives. He has represented the 73rd district since 2025.
