= Larry R. Brown =

American politician (1943–2012)

Larry Brown
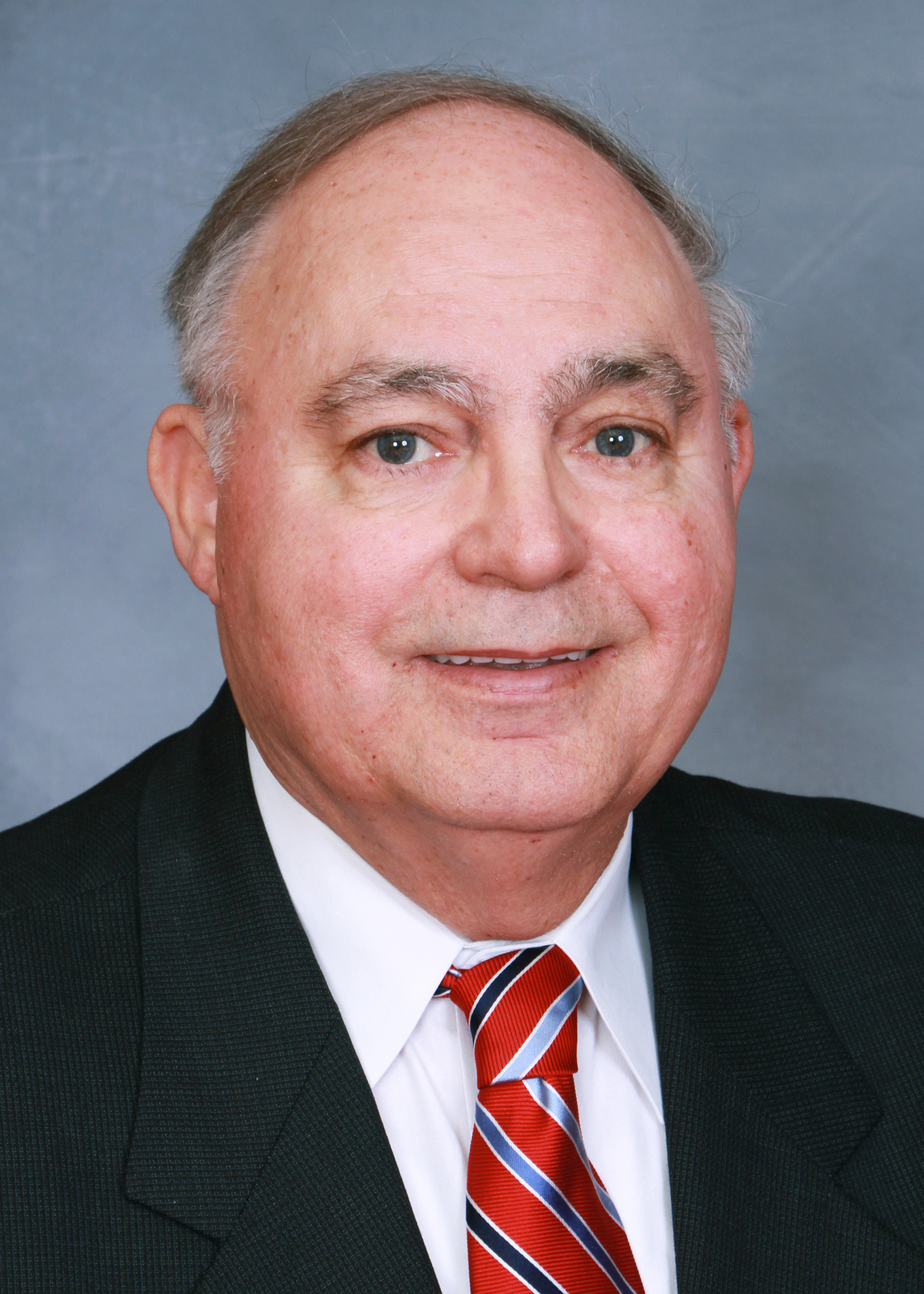

Member of the North Carolina House of Representatives from the 73rd district
- In office January 1, 2005 – August 16, 2012
- Preceded by: Michael Decker (Redistricting)
- Succeeded by: Joyce Krawiec

Personal details
- Born: Larry Ray Brown; February 9, 1943 Winston-Salem, North Carolina, U.S.
- Died: August 16, 2012 (aged 69) Pinehurst, North Carolina, U.S.
- Party: Republican
- Spouse: Martha Vance Brown
- Education: Central Wesleyan College
- Profession: Postal worker, real estate broker

Military service
- Allegiance: United States
- Branch/service: United States Navy
- Years of service: 1965–1968

Larry Ray Brown (February 9, 1943 – August 16, 2012) was an American politician. He was a member of the North Carolina House of Representatives, and represented the 73rd district from 2005 to 2012. After redistricting, he lost the May 2012 Republican primary election for the 74th district and died of a heart attack while in office on August 16, 2012.

A controversy arose in 2010 after he referred to gays as "fruitloops" and "queers" in an email to fellow House members.

== Biography ==
Larry R. Brown was born in Winston-Salem, North Carolina, to William Edgar Brown and Ruth Holcomb Brown on February 9, 1943. He graduated from Kernersville High School and then served in the U.S. Navy from 1965 to 1968. In 1971, Brown received a Bachelor of Arts degree in business administration from Central Wesleyan College, now known as Southern Wesleyan University.

Brown then worked for the United States Postal Service and later as a real estate broker. He was a town alderman of Kernersville, North Carolina, from 1977 to 1981 and from 1985 to 1992. He was the mayor pro tempore in 1985, and was the mayor from 1997 to January 2005, when he resigned to take his seat in the North Carolina General Assembly.

He was first elected in 2004, when he defeated Michael P. Decker in the Republican primary. Decker had earlier switched his affiliation from Republican to Democrat.

== Electoral history ==
=== 2012 ===
North Carolina House of Representatives 74th district Republican primary election, 2012
Party	Candidate	Votes	%
Republican	Debra Conrad	4,679	42.77%
Republican	Larry Brown (incumbent)	3,197	29.22%
Republican	Glenn L. Cobb	3,065	28.01%
Total votes		10,941	100%

=== 2010 ===
North Carolina House of Representatives 73rd district general election, 2010
Party	Candidate	Votes	%
Republican	Larry Brown (incumbent)	17,675	100%
Total votes		17,675	100%
Republican hold			

=== 2008 ===
North Carolina House of Representatives 73rd district general election, 2008
Party	Candidate	Votes	%
Republican	Larry Brown (incumbent)	26,636	83.80%
Libertarian	Cary Morris	5,151	16.20%
Total votes		31,787	100%
Republican hold			

=== 2006 ===
North Carolina House of Representatives 73rd district general election, 2006
Party	Candidate	Votes	%
Republican	Larry Brown (incumbent)	11,432	100%
Total votes		11,432	100%
Republican hold			

=== 2004 ===
North Carolina House of Representatives 73rd district Republican primary election, 2004
Party	Candidate	Votes	%
Republican	Larry Brown	4,250	77.03%
Republican	Michael Decker (incumbent)	1,267	22.97%
Total votes		5,517	100%

North Carolina House of Representatives 73rd district general election, 2004
Party	Candidate	Votes	%
Republican	Larry Brown	23,966	86.46%
Libertarian	Michael Smith	3,754	13.54%
Total votes		27,720	100%
Republican hold			

North Carolina House of Representatives
Preceded by Curtis Blackwood	Member of the North Carolina House of Representatives from the 73rd district 2005–2012	Succeeded by Joyce Krawiec
