= Diamond Staton-Williams =

American politician

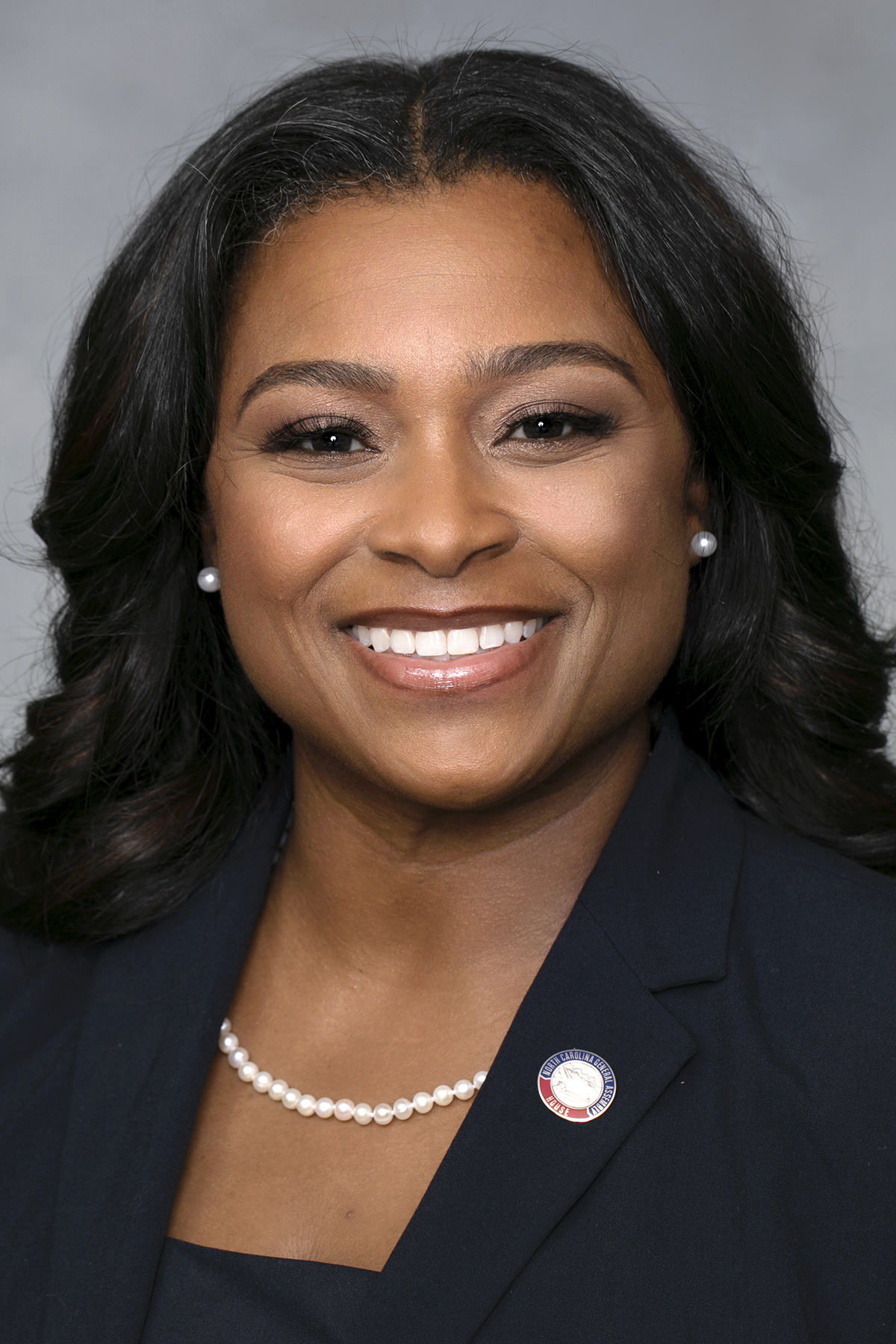

Member of the North Carolina House of Representatives from the 73rd district
- In office January 1, 2023 – January 1, 2025
- Preceded by: Larry Pittman (Redistricting)
- Succeeded by: Jonathan Almond

Personal details
- Party: Democratic
- Occupation: Politician; nurse; businesswoman

Diamond R. Staton-Williams is an American politician, registered nurse and business owner. A member of the Democratic Party, she is a former member of the North Carolina House of Representatives, who represented the 73rd district (which includes parts of Cabarrus County) from 2023 to 2025.

In the 2022 election, Staton-Williams beat Republican nominee Brian Echevarria by 629 votes. This victory helped stop a Republican supermajority in the House by one seat. In the 2024 state house election, she lost reelection to Republican nominee Jonathan Almond.

== Committee assignments ==
=== 2023–2024 session ===
- Appropriations
- Appropriations - Capital
- Environment
- Federal Relations and American Indian Affairs
- UNC BOG Nominations
- Disaster Recovery and Homeland Security

== Electoral history ==
=== 2024 ===
North Carolina House of Representatives 73rd district general election, 2024
Party	Candidate	Votes	%
Republican	Jonathan Almond	23,400	53.21%
Democratic	Diamond Staton-Williams (incumbent)	20,577	46.79%
Total votes		43,977	100%
Republican gain from Democratic			

=== 2022 ===
North Carolina House of Representatives 73rd district general election, 2022
Party	Candidate	Votes	%
Democratic	Diamond Staton-Williams	14,108	51.14%
Republican	Brian Echevarria	13,479	48.86%
Total votes		27,587	100%
Democratic gain from Republican			

North Carolina House of Representatives
Preceded by Lee Zachary	Member of the North Carolina House of Representatives from the 73rd district 2023–2025	Succeeded by Jonathan Almond
