= Michael P. Decker =

American politician from North Carolina

Member of the North Carolina House of Representatives
- In office January 1, 1985 – January 1, 2005
- Preceded by: William Grimsley Jr.
- Succeeded by: Larry Brown (redistricting)
- Constituency: 29th District (1985–1993); 84th District (1993–2003); 94th District (2003–2005)

Personal details
- Born: Michael Paul Decker Sr. December 18, 1944 (age 81) Red Bud, Illinois
- Party: Republican; Democratic (formerly)
- Occupation: Politician; Teacher
- Known for: Former member of the North Carolina House of Representatives; Political corruption

Michael Paul Decker Sr. (born December 18, 1944) is a former member of the North Carolina House of Representatives who represented the 94th district, including constituents in Forsyth County. A former teacher from Walkertown, North Carolina, Decker served 10 terms in the state House, ending with the 2003–2004 session. He was born in Red Bud, Illinois.

== Bribery scandal ==
Just before the opening of the 2003–2004 legislative session, Decker, an outspoken conservative, switched from the Republican Party to the Democratic Party. This led to a 60–60 split in the House, producing a power-sharing arrangement between the two parties. Prior to his switch, the Republicans had a 61-59 majority, and therefore were set to control the state House. Shortly before the 2004 elections, Decker switched back to the Republican Party. He was defeated in the 2004 Republican primary by Larry Brown of Kernersville, who went on to win the general election.

In August 2006, Decker pleaded guilty in federal court to receiving $50,000 in cash and checks as well as a legislative job for his son, all in exchange for supporting Democrat Jim Black for the Speaker of the House position (although Black was not mentioned by name in Decker's federal plea deal). The bribe was made in the form of an envelope containing $38,000 in blank checks from Black's fellow North Carolina optometrists, plus $12,000 in cash from an undisclosed source. The envelope was transferred to Decker by a Democratic member of the House, at a Salisbury, North Carolina, IHOP restaurant. Black's office has said that at some point in 2002, Decker met Jim Black at the IHOP in Salisbury to talk.

Black maintained that the $50,000 was campaign funding support from the House Leader to a new Democratic Party member. Decker maintained it was a bribe for him to switch parties so that Black could remain Speaker of the House. In 2007, Black pleaded guilty, (but did not actually admit guilt) to essentially what Decker alleged.

On April 27, 2007, Decker was sentenced to four years in prison and a $50,000 fine for his involvement in the scheme. The sentence was twice what the prosecution was seeking. U.S. District Court Judge James C. Dever III called the scheme "an epic betrayal." He reported to a federal prison in South Carolina in September 2007.

== Recent electoral history ==
=== 2004 ===
North Carolina House of Representatives 73rd district Republican primary election, 2004
Party	Candidate	Votes	%
Republican	Larry Brown	4,250	77.03%
Republican	Michael Decker (incumbent)	1,267	22.97%
Total votes		5,517	100%

=== 2002 ===
North Carolina House of Representatives 94th district Republican primary election, 2002
Party	Candidate	Votes	%
Republican	Michael Decker (incumbent)	3,908	61.17%
Republican	Edward L. Powell	2,481	38.83%
Total votes		6,389	100%

North Carolina House of Representatives 94th district general election, 2002
Party	Candidate	Votes	%
Republican	Michael Decker (incumbent)	17,110	84.96%
Libertarian	Ed Topolski	3,029	15.04%
Total votes		20,139	100%
Republican hold			

=== 2000 ===
North Carolina House of Representatives 84th district general election, 2000
Party	Candidate	Votes	%
Republican	Michael Decker (incumbent)	18,708	65.00%
Democratic	Joseph M. Coltrane Jr.	10,074	35.00%
Total votes		28,782	100%
Republican hold			

North Carolina House of Representatives
Preceded by William T. Grimsley Jr.	Member of the North Carolina House of Representatives from the 29th district 1985–1993	Succeeded by Joanne Bowie
Preceded by Constituency established	Member of the North Carolina House of Representatives from the 84th district 1993–2003	Succeeded by Phillip Frye
Preceded by Jerry Dockham	Member of the North Carolina House of Representatives from the 94th district 2003–2005	Succeeded by Tracy Walker
