= Lee Zachary =

American politician (born 1946)

Representative Lee Zachary
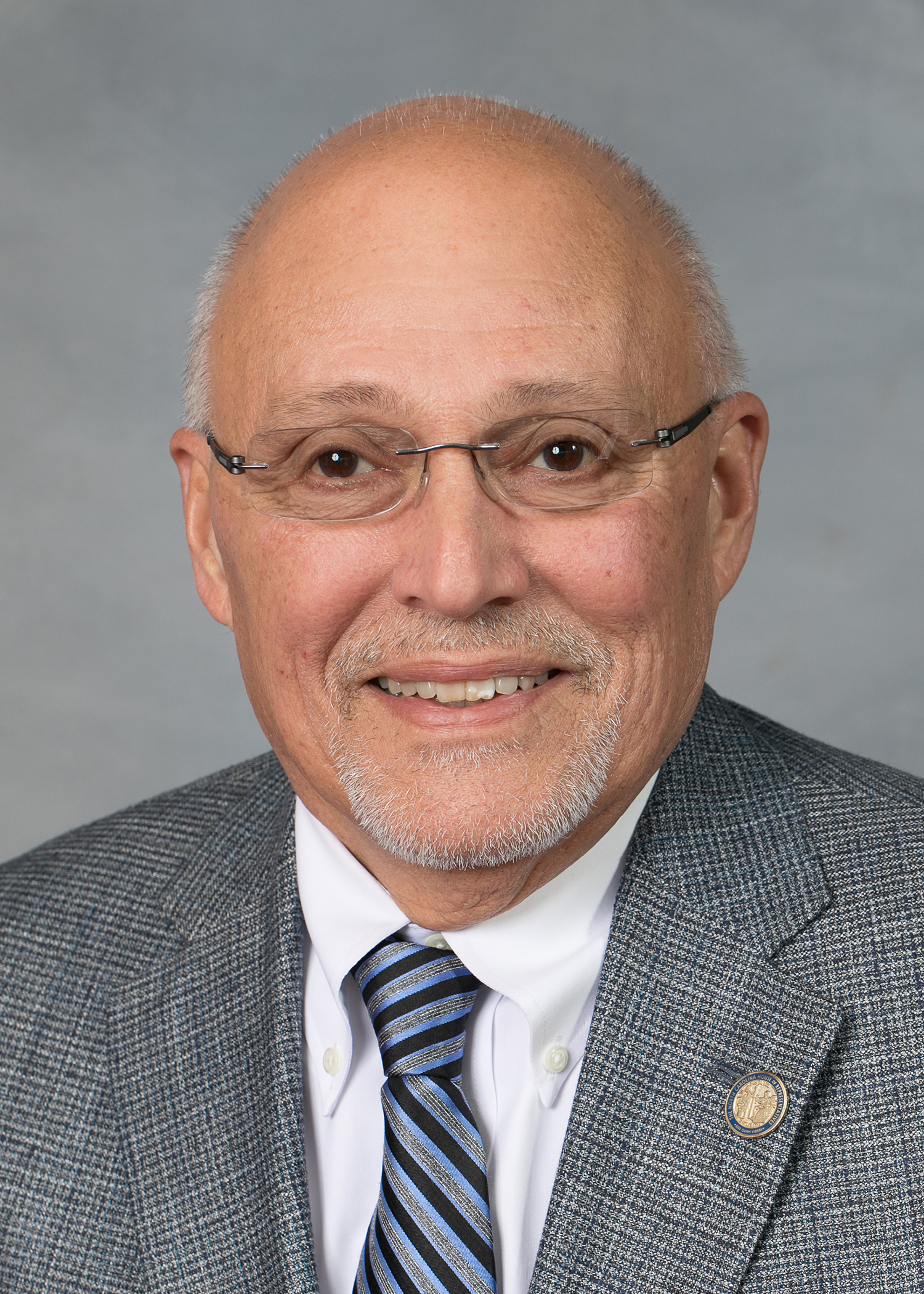

Member of the North Carolina House of Representatives from the 73rd district
- In office January 1, 2015 – January 1, 2023
- Preceded by: Mark Hollo
- Succeeded by: Julia Craven Howard (Redistricting)

Personal details
- Born: Walter Lee Zachary Jr. December 8, 1946 (age 79) Yadkinville, North Carolina, U.S.
- Party: Republican
- Spouse: Valerie Zachary
- Education: University of North Carolina at Chapel Hill (JD)

Walter Lee Zachary Jr. (born December 18, 1946) is a former Republican member of the North Carolina House of Representatives. He represented the 73rd district (including all of Yadkin County and portions of Forsyth County) from 2015 to 2023.

== Committee assignments ==
=== 2021-2022 Session ===
- Education - Community Colleges
- Education - Universities
- Ethics
- Finance
- Judiciary III (Chair)
- Redistricting
- Alcoholic Beverage Control

=== 2019-2020 Session ===
- Alcoholic Beverage Control
- Education - Universities
- Ethics
- Education - Community Colleges
- Finance
- Judiciary III (Vice Chair)

=== 2017-2018 Session ===
- Agriculture
- Alcoholic Beverage Control
- Appropriations
- Appropriations - Education
- Education - Community Colleges
- Energy and Public Utilities
- Health
- Judiciary III (Chair)

=== 2015-2016 Session ===
- Agriculture (Vice-Chair)
- Alcoholic Beverage Control
- Banking
- Finance
- Judiciary III
- Transportation
- Wildlife Resources

== Electoral history ==
=== 2022 ===
North Carolina Senate 36th district Republican primary election, 2022
Party	Candidate	Votes	%
Republican	Eddie Settle	10,756	37.23%
Republican	Shirley Randleman	9,228	31.94%
Republican	Lee Zachary	5,053	17.49%
Republican	Vann Tate	3,852	13.33%
Total votes		28,889	100%

=== 2020 ===
North Carolina House of Representatives 73rd district general election, 2020
Party	Candidate	Votes	%
Republican	Lee Zachary (incumbent)	24,703	64.54%
Democratic	William Stinson	13,570	35.46%
Total votes		38,273	100%
Republican hold			

=== 2018 ===
North Carolina House of Representatives 73rd district general election, 2018
Party	Candidate	Votes	%
Republican	Lee Zachary (incumbent)	19,763	64.10%
Democratic	William Stinson	11,070	35.90%
Total votes		30,833	100%
Republican hold			

=== 2016 ===
North Carolina House of Representatives 73rd district Republican primary election, 2016
Party	Candidate	Votes	%
Republican	Lee Zachary (incumbent)	6,794	51.47%
Republican	Dwight Shook	6,406	48.53%
Total votes		13,200	100%

North Carolina House of Representatives 73rd district general election, 2016
Party	Candidate	Votes	%
Republican	Lee Zachary (incumbent)	30,354	100%
Total votes		30,354	100%
Republican hold			

=== 2014 ===
North Carolina House of Representatives 73rd district Republican primary election, 2014
Party	Candidate	Votes	%
Republican	Lee Zachary	5,729	64.23%
Republican	Dwight Shook	3,190	35.77%
Total votes		8,919	100%

North Carolina House of Representatives 73rd district general election, 2014
Party	Candidate	Votes	%
Republican	Lee Zachary	19,650	100%
Total votes		19,650	100%
Republican hold			

North Carolina House of Representatives
Preceded by Mark Hollo	Member of the North Carolina House of Representatives from the 73rd district 2015–2023	Succeeded by Diamond Staton-Williams
