= Frank Iler =

American politician

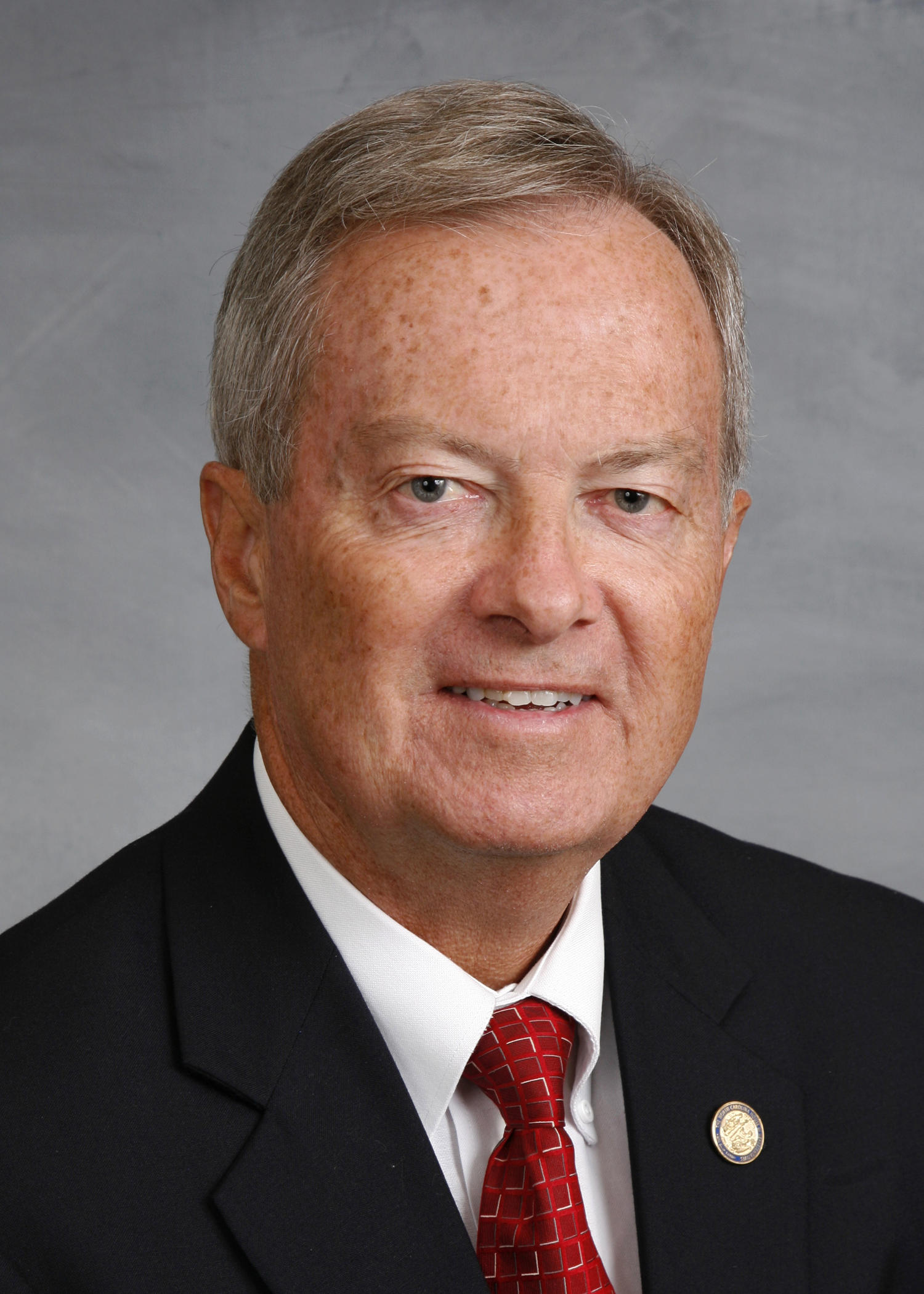

Member of the North Carolina House of Representatives from the 17th district
- Incumbent
- Assumed office June 18, 2009
- Preceded by: Bonner Stiller

Personal details
- Born: Francis Robertson Iler Jr. January 10, 1942 (age 84)
- Party: Republican
- Children: 1
- Education: Campbell University (BA)
- Occupation: Retired
- Website: Campaign Wesbsite; NCGA Profile

Francis Robertson "Frank" Iler Jr. (born. January 10, 1942) is a Republican member of the North Carolina House of Representatives. Iler has represented the 17th district (including constituents in Brunswick County) since 2009. A retired businessman who lives in Oak Island, North Carolina, Iler was appointed when Bonner Stiller resigned in 2009.

== Electoral history ==
=== 2020 ===
North Carolina House of Representatives 17th district general election, 2020
Party	Candidate	Votes	%
Republican	Frank Iler (incumbent)	36,800	62.44%
Democratic	Tom Simmons	22,140	37.56%
Total votes		58,940	100%
Republican hold			

=== 2018 ===
North Carolina House of Representatives 17th district Republican primary election, 2018
Party	Candidate	Votes	%
Republican	Frank Iler (incumbent)	3,170	61.13%
Republican	Patricia (Pat) Sykes	2,016	38.87%
Total votes		5,186	100%

North Carolina House of Representatives 17th district general election, 2018
Party	Candidate	Votes	%
Republican	Frank Iler (incumbent)	28,930	63.48%
Democratic	Tom Simmons	16,642	36.52%
Total votes		45,572	100%
Republican hold			

=== 2016 ===
North Carolina House of Representatives 17th district Republican primary election, 2016
Party	Candidate	Votes	%
Republican	Frank Iler (incumbent)	10,129	67.64%
Republican	Marion D. Davis	4,846	32.36%
Total votes		14,975	100%

North Carolina House of representatives 17th district general election, 2016
Party	Candidate	Votes	%
Republican	Frank Iler (incumbent)	32,757	66.44%
Democratic	Charles Warren	16,549	33.56%
Total votes		49,306	100%
Republican hold			

=== 2014 ===
North Carolina House of Representatives 17th district Republican primary election, 2014
Party	Candidate	Votes	%
Republican	Frank Iler (incumbent)	5,493	69.64%
Republican	Marion Davis	2,395	30.36%
Total votes		7,888	100%

North Carolina House of representatives 17th district general election, 2014
Party	Candidate	Votes	%
Republican	Frank Iler (incumbent)	20,945	67.14%
Democratic	Charles Warren	10,251	32.86%
Total votes		31,196	100%
Republican hold			

=== 2012 ===
North Carolina House of representatives 17th district general election, 2012
Party	Candidate	Votes	%
Republican	Frank Iler (incumbent)	27,578	66.16%
Democratic	Lundia Washington	14,107	33.84%
Total votes		41,685	100%
Republican hold			

=== 2010 ===
North Carolina House of Representatives 17th district Republican primary election, 2010
Party	Candidate	Votes	%
Republican	Frank Iler (incumbent)	6,131	74.43%
Republican	Mac Tyson	2,106	25.57%
Total votes		8,237	100%

North Carolina House of representatives 17th district general election, 2010
Party	Candidate	Votes	%
Republican	Frank Iler (incumbent)	24,065	68.35%
Democratic	James A. Knox	11,146	31.65%
Total votes		35,211	100%
Republican hold			

== Committee assignments ==
=== 2021-2022 session ===
- Appropriations (Vice Chair)
- Appropriations - Transportations (Chair)
- Transportation (Chair)
- Environment (Vice Chair)
- Commerce
- Education - K-12
- Election Law and Campaign Finance Reform
- Marine Resources and Aqua Culture

=== 2019-2020 session ===
- Appropriations (Vice Chair)
- Appropriations - Transportation (Chair)
- Transportation (Chair)
- Environment
- Education - K-12
- Commerce
- Insurance

=== 2017-2018 session ===
- Appropriations (Vice Chair)
- Appropriations - Transportation (Chair)
- Transportation (Chair)
- Environment
- Education - K-12
- Elections and Ethics Law
- Insurance

=== 2015-2016 session ===
- Appropriations (Vice Chair)
- Appropriations - Transportation (Chair)
- Transportation (Chair)
- Environment
- Education - K-12
- Elections
- Insurance

=== 2013-2014 session ===
- Appropriations
- Transportation (Chair)
- Environment
- Education
- Elections
- Regulatory Reform

=== 2011-2012 session ===
- Appropriations
- Transportation (Chair)
- Environment
- Education
- Elections

=== 2009-2010 session ===
- Appropriations
- Transportation
- Education
- Marine Resources and Aquaculture
- Wildlife Resources

North Carolina House of Representatives
Preceded by Bonner Stiller	Member of the North Carolina House of Representatives from the 17th district 2009-present	Incumbent
