= North Carolina's 74th House district =

American legislative district

North Carolina's 74th State House of Representatives district
Representative
Jeff Zenger; R–Lewisville
- Demographics: 71% White; 13% Black; 8% Hispanic; 3% Asian; 4% Multiracial
- Population (2024): 86,878

North Carolina's 74th House district is one of 120 districts in the North Carolina House of Representatives. It has been represented by Republican Jeff Zenger since 2021.

== Geography ==
Since 2005, the district has included part of Forsyth County. The district overlaps with the 31st and 32nd Senate districts.

== District officeholders ==
Representative	Party	Dates	Notes	Counties
District created January 1, 1993.
Julia Craven Howard (Mocksville)	Republican	January 1, 1993 – January 1, 2003	Redistricted from the 37th district. Redistricted to the 79th district.	1993–2003; All of Davie County. Part of Davidson County.
Linda Johnson (Kannapolis)	Republican	January 1, 2003 – January 1, 2005	Redistricted from the 90th district. Redistricted to the 83rd district.	2003–2005; Part of Cabarrus County.
Dale Folwell (Winston-Salem)	Republican	January 1, 2005 – January 1, 2013	Retired to run for Lieutenant Governor.	2005–Present; Parts of Forsyth County.
Debra Conrad (Winston-Salem)	Republican	January 1, 2013 – July 31, 2020	Resigned.	2005–Present; Parts of Forsyth County.
Vacant		July 31, 2020 – August 17, 2020		2005–Present; Parts of Forsyth County.
Wes Schollander (Winston-Salem)	Republican	August 17, 2020 – January 1, 2021	Appointed to finish Conrad's term. Retired.	2005–Present; Parts of Forsyth County.
Jeff Zenger (Lewisville)	Republican	January 1, 2021 – Present		2005–Present; Parts of Forsyth County.

== Election results ==
=== 2024 ===
North Carolina House of Representatives 74th district Democratic primary election, 2024
Party	Candidate	Votes	%
Democratic	Amy Taylor North	4,954	79.74%
Democratic	Mack Wilder	1,259	20.26%
Total votes		6,213	100%

North Carolina House of Representatives 74th district general election, 2024
Party	Candidate	Votes	%
Republican	Jeff Zenger (incumbent)	26,908	51.82%
Democratic	Amy Taylor North	25,015	48.18%
Total votes		51,923	100%
Republican hold			

=== 2022 ===
North Carolina House of Representatives 74th district Democratic primary election, 2022
Party	Candidate	Votes	%
Democratic	Carla Catalan Day	3,474	68.52%
Democratic	Sean Lew	1,596	31.48%
Total votes		5,070	100%

North Carolina House of Representatives 74th district general election, 2022
Party	Candidate	Votes	%
Republican	Jeff Zenger (incumbent)	20,245	52.37%
Democratic	Carla Catalan Day	18,416	47.63%
Total votes		38,661	100%
Republican hold			

=== 2020 ===
North Carolina House of Representatives 74th district general election, 2020
Party	Candidate	Votes	%
Republican	Jeff Zenger	27,843	51.19%
Democratic	Dan Besse	26,550	48.81%
Total votes		54,393	100%
Republican hold			

=== 2018 ===
North Carolina House of Representatives 74th district general election, 2018
Party	Candidate	Votes	%
Republican	Debra Conrad (incumbent)	19,423	54.51%
Democratic	Terri Elizabeth LeGrand	16,212	45.49%
Total votes		35,635	100%
Republican hold			

=== 2016 ===
North Carolina House of Representatives 74th district general election, 2016
Party	Candidate	Votes	%
Republican	Debra Conrad (incumbent)	27,209	63.52%
Democratic	Marilynn Baker	15,626	36.48%
Total votes		42,835	100%
Republican hold			

=== 2014 ===
North Carolina House of Representatives 74th district general election, 2014
Party	Candidate	Votes	%
Republican	Debra Conrad (incumbent)	17,654	63.04%
Democratic	Mary Dickinson	10,351	36.96%
Total votes		28,005	100%
Republican hold			

=== 2012 ===
North Carolina House of Representatives 74th district Democratic primary election, 2012
Party	Candidate	Votes	%
Democratic	David W. Moore	3,184	55.87%
Democratic	John C. Gladman	2,515	44.13%
Total votes		5,699	100%

North Carolina House of Representatives 74th district Republican primary election, 2012
Party	Candidate	Votes	%
Republican	Debra Conrad	4,679	42.77%
Republican	Larry Brown (incumbent)	3,197	29.22%
Republican	Glenn L. Cobb	3,065	28.01%
Total votes		10,941	100%

North Carolina House of Representatives 74th district general election, 2012
Party	Candidate	Votes	%
Republican	Debra Conrad	26,616	64.36%
Democratic	David W. Moore	14,742	35.64%
Total votes		41,358	100%
Republican hold			

=== 2010 ===
North Carolina House of Representatives 74th district general election, 2010
Party	Candidate	Votes	%
Republican	Dale Folwell (incumbent)	17,475	69.32%
Democratic	Cristina V. Vazquez	7,733	30.68%
Total votes		25,208	100%
Republican hold			

=== 2008 ===
North Carolina House of Representatives 74th district general election, 2008
Party	Candidate	Votes	%
Republican	Dale Folwell (incumbent)	21,933	59.25%
Democratic	Wade Boyles	15,086	40.75%
Total votes		37,019	100%
Republican hold			

=== 2006 ===
North Carolina House of Representatives 74th district general election, 2006
Party	Candidate	Votes	%
Republican	Dale Folwell (incumbent)	13,942	100%
Total votes		13,942	100%
Republican hold			

=== 2004 ===
North Carolina House of Representatives 74th district Republican primary election, 2004
Party	Candidate	Votes	%
Republican	Dale Folwell	2,351	29.13%
Republican	Debra Conrad	2,066	25.60%
Republican	Winfield Beroth	1,541	19.09%
Republican	Jonathan Dills	882	10.93%
Republican	Tom Southern	629	7.79%
Republican	Derrick G. Hinson Sr.	346	4.29%
Republican	Josh Wood	256	3.17%
Total votes		8,071	100%

North Carolina House of Representatives 74th district Republican primary run-off election, 2004
Party	Candidate	Votes	%
Republican	Dale Folwell	4,656	66.52%
Republican	Debra Conrad	2,343	33.48%
Total votes		6,999	100%

North Carolina House of Representatives 74th district general election, 2004
Party	Candidate	Votes	%
Republican	Dale Folwell	21,248	62.94%
Democratic	Tom Brandon	12,510	37.06%
Total votes		33,758	100%
Republican win (new seat)			

=== 2002 ===
North Carolina House of Representatives 74th district general section, 2002
Party	Candidate	Votes	%
Republican	Linda Johnson (incumbent)	12,835	65.24%
Democratic	Glenn White	6,243	1.73%
Libertarian	Caroline Gellner	596	3.03%
Total votes		19,674	100%
Republican hold			

=== 2000 ===
North Carolina House of Representatives 74th district Republican primary election, 2000
Party	Candidate	Votes	%
Republican	Julia Craven Howard (incumbent)	5,111	79.04%
Republican	Mike Morris	1,355	20.96%
Total votes		6,466	100%

North Carolina House of Representatives 74th district general election, 2000
Party	Candidate	Votes	%
Republican	Julia Craven Howard (incumbent)	22,773	100%
Total votes		22,773	100%
Republican hold			
