= Eric Terashima =

American colonel

Eric Terashima (born 1968 or 1969) is an American retired military officer. He is known for his service as a colonel in the United States Marine Corps. He served for 30 years, and had twelve deployments that included eight combat tours., with three of those being in Afghanistan.

== Biography ==
He was born in Los Angeles to a Japanese immigrant father and third-generation Japanese American mother. During World War II, his mother's family, the Shimonishis, was forced from their home in southern California and made to move into an internment camp. The family went to Japan after they were released from the camp. Terashima's grandmother worked at a Naval Air Station in Iwakuni. She then took her five children and moved back to California.

He attended the University of Notre Dame on a full Reserve Officers' Training Corps (ROTC) scholarship. After graduating, he served in Okinawa in Japan and in South Korea in the 1990s. He left active duty in 1997 and worked with the company John Deere. After the September 11 attacks on the United States in 2001, he returned to active combat. He married several years afterwards, and his wife worked various jobs in agriculture and in the oil industry while he served.

He retired from military service on June 1, 2021. After the 2021 fall of Kabul and withdrawal of the United States from Afghanistan, Terashima has donated thousands of dollars of his own money and started fundraising campaigns to support people that he knew from his time in Afghanistan. He has personally helped Afghani refugees with resettling in and adjusting to the United States. He has post-traumatic stress disorder (PTSD) from his experiences. Terashima ran for a position in the North Carolina House of Representatives as a member of the Democratic Party. He has also volunteered to fight in support of Ukraine in the Russo-Ukrainian War.
