= Robert Brawley =

American politician from North Carolina

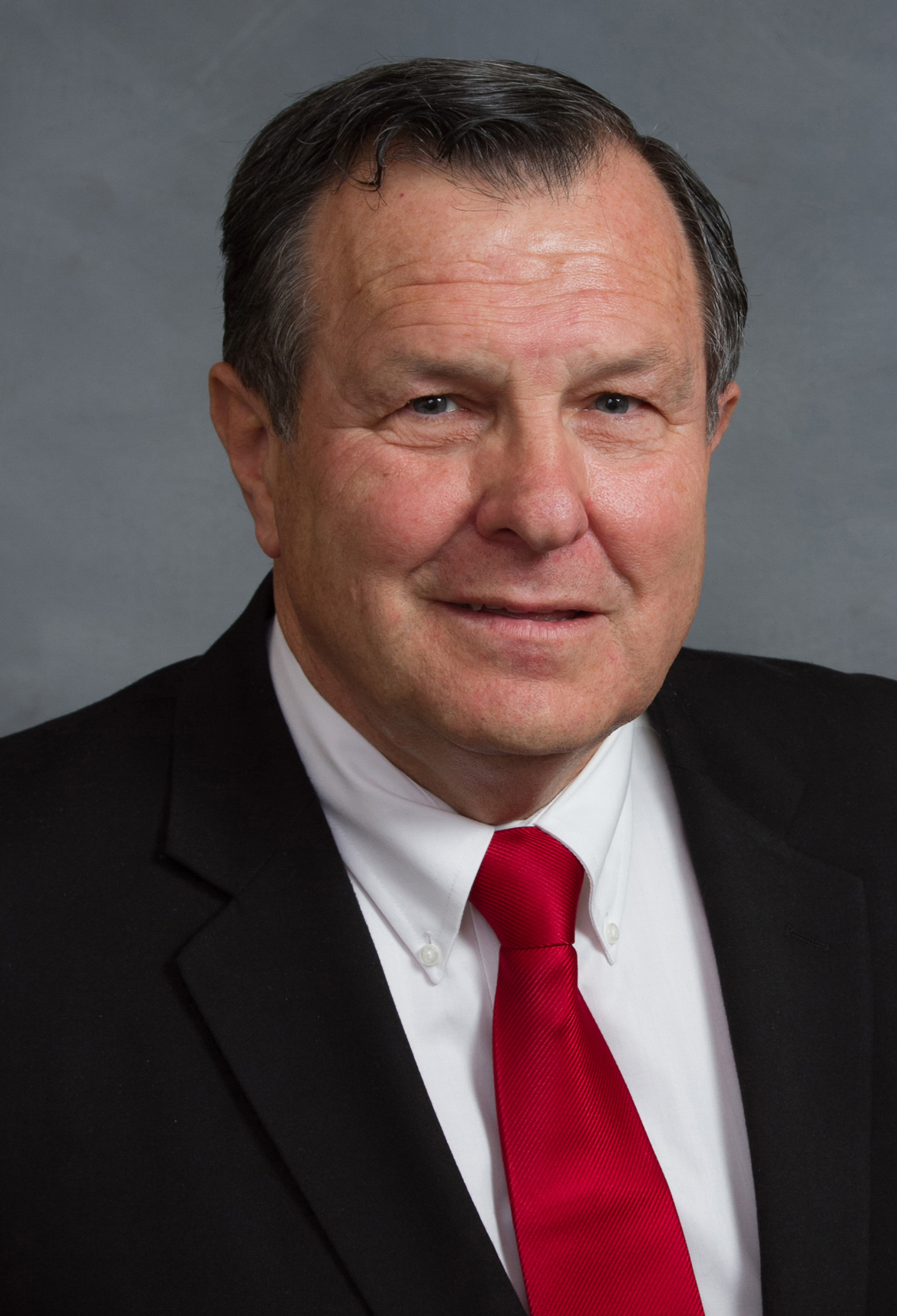

Member of the North Carolina House of Representatives
- In office January 1, 2013 – January 1, 2015
- Preceded by: Grey Mills
- Succeeded by: John Fraley
- Constituency: 95th District
- In office January 1, 1981 – January 1, 1999
- Preceded by: William Hannon McMillan
- Succeeded by: Mitchell Setzer
- Constituency: 35th District (1981–1983); 43rd District (1983–1999)

Personal details
- Born: Clyde Robert Brawley; April 10, 1944 (age 82) Mooresville, North Carolina, U.S.
- Party: Republican
- Education: North Carolina State University

Clyde Robert Brawley (born April 10, 1944) is a former American politician who was a Republican member of the North Carolina General Assembly.

He represented the state's 43rd House district, including constituents in Catawba and Iredell counties (formerly the 35th district and now the 95th district) from 1981 until he retired in 1999. While in office, Brawley was elected the President of the National Republican Legislators Association and was named National Legislator of the Year in 1995.

Brawley ran for North Carolina Commissioner of Insurance in 2004, losing to Democratic incumbent James Long.

In 2012, Brawley was again elected to the House from the Iredell County-based 95th district. He won the May 8 Republican primary, which was tantamount to election, since no Democrat filed for the seat as it is a Republican leaning district. Meanwhile, Brawley was also in 2012 named to lead the North Carolina chapter of the Faith and Freedom Coalition, a potential conflict of interest.

In April 2013, Brawley filed House Bill 640 that would allow lobbyists to give unreported gifts to state lawmakers in North Carolina.

In May 2013, Brawley resigned as chairman of the House Finance Committee in a dispute with House Speaker Thom Tillis. Brawley lost his bid for another term in the May 2014 Republican primary, with some of his colleagues in the House campaigning against him. Afterwards, the House Republican Caucus passed a vote of "no confidence" in Brawley, effectively barring him from caucus meetings. Brawley suggested that the censure was in retaliation for his criticism of Tillis.

On December 9, 2015, Brawley announced his candidacy for the office of Governor of North Carolina, challenging incumbent Pat McCrory. He ended up losing the Republican primary to McCrory on March 13, 2016 as McCrory had incumbency advantage behind him.

== Electoral history ==
=== 2024 ===
North Carolina Commissioner of Insurance Republican primary election, 2024
Party	Candidate	Votes	%
Republican	Mike Causey (incumbent)	535,909	60.57%
Republican	Andrew Marcus	193,962	21.92%
Republican	Robert Brawley	154,843	17.50%
Total votes		884,714	100%

=== 2016 ===
North Carolina Gubernatorial Republican primary election, 2016
Party	Candidate	Votes	%
Republican	Pat McCrory (incumbent)	876,885	81.75%
Republican	Robert Brawley	113,638	10.59%
Republican	Charles Kenneth Moss	82,132	7.66%
Total votes		1,072,655	100%

=== 2014 ===
North Carolina House of Representatives 95th district Republican primary election, 2014
Party	Candidate	Votes	%
Republican	John Fraley	2,881	50.94%
Republican	Robert Brawley (incumbent)	2,775	49.06%
Total votes		5,656	100%

=== 2012 ===
North Carolina House of Representatives 95th district Republican primary election, 2012
Party	Candidate	Votes	%
Republican	Robert Brawley	4,947	57.59%
Republican	Charlton L. Allen	3,001	34.94%
Republican	Marc Fasano	642	7.47%
Total votes		8,590	100%

North Carolina House of Representatives 95th district general election, 2012
Party	Candidate	Votes	%
Republican	Robert Brawley	27,856	94.84%
Unaffiliated	Barbara Orr (write-in)	1,310	4.46%
Write-in		207	0.70%
Total votes		29,373	100%
Republican hold			

=== 2006 ===
North Carolina House of Representatives 95th district Republican primary election, 2006
Party	Candidate	Votes	%
Republican	Karen Ray (incumbent)	1,528	52.33%
Republican	Robert Brawley	1,392	47.67%
Total votes		2,920	100%

=== 2004 ===
North Carolina Commissioner of Insurance Republican primary election, 2004
Party	Candidate	Votes	%
Republican	Robert Brawley	166,919	58.03%
Republican	Cindy Huntsberry	120,710	41.97%
Total votes		287,629	100%

North Carolina Commissioner of Insurance general election, 2004
Party	Candidate	Votes	%
Democratic	James Long (incumbent)	1,934,076	57.64%
Republican	Robert Brawley	1,421,398	42.36%
Total votes		3,355,474	100%
Democratic hold			

=== 2002 ===
North Carolina House of Representatives 95th district Republican primary election, 2002
Party	Candidate	Votes	%
Republican	Karen Ray	2,547	56.41%
Republican	Robert Brawley	1,968	43.59%
Total votes		4,515	100%

Party political offices
Preceded by Mike Causey	Republican nominee for North Carolina Commissioner of Insurance; 2004	Succeeded by John Odom
North Carolina House of Representatives
Preceded by William Hannon McMillan	Member of the North Carolina House of Representatives from the 35th district 1981–1983; Served alongside: Joseph Patterson Huskins	Succeeded by Bradford Verdize Ligon; Robie Lee Nash
Preceded by Marie Colton; Narvel Crawford; Gordon Hicks Greenwood; Martin Nesbitt	Member of the North Carolina House of Representatives from the 43rd district 1983–1999	Succeeded by Mitchell Setzer
Preceded by Grey Mills	Member of the North Carolina House of Representatives from the 95th district 2013–2015	Succeeded by John Fraley
