= Martin Nesbitt (politician) =

American politician from North Carolina (1946–2014)

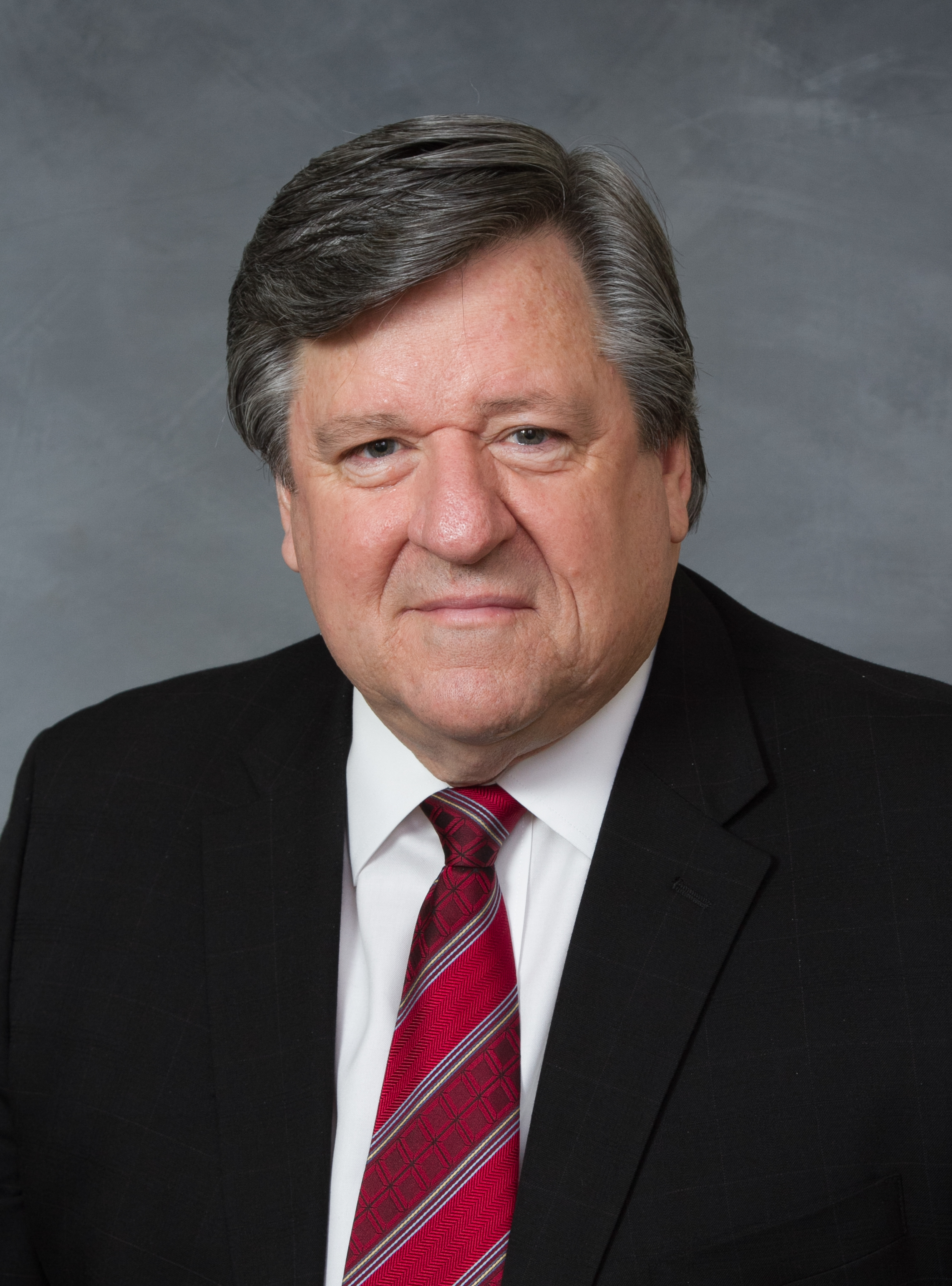

Minority Leader of the North Carolina Senate
- In office January 1, 2011 – March 2, 2014
- Preceded by: Phil Berger
- Succeeded by: Dan Blue

Majority Leader of the North Carolina Senate
- In office November 17, 2009 – January 1, 2011
- Leader: Marc Basnight
- Preceded by: Tony Rand
- Succeeded by: Harry Brown

Member of the North Carolina Senate from the 49th district
- In office February 6, 2004 – March 6, 2014
- Preceded by: Steve Metcalf
- Succeeded by: Terry Van Duyn

Member of the North Carolina House of Representatives
- In office January 1, 1997 – February 6, 2004
- Preceded by: Larry R. Linney
- Succeeded by: Susan Fisher
- Constituency: 51st district (1997–2003); 114th district (2003–2004)
- In office September 13, 1979 – January 1, 1995
- Preceded by: Mary Cordell Nesbitt
- Succeeded by: Lanier M. Cansler; Larry R. Linney; Wilma Sherrill
- Constituency: 43rd district (1979–1983); 51st district (1983–1995)

Personal details
- Born: Martin Luther Nesbitt Jr. September 25, 1946 Asheville, North Carolina, U.S.
- Died: March 6, 2014 (aged 67) Asheville, North Carolina, U.S.
- Party: Democratic
- Education: University of North Carolina, Chapel Hill (AB, JD)

Martin Luther Nesbitt Jr. (September 25, 1946 – March 6, 2014) was a Democratic member of the North Carolina Senate. He represented the 49th district (Buncombe County). An attorney from Asheville, North Carolina, Nesbitt was elected to 11 terms in the state House before moving to the state senate in 2004.

== Political career ==
Nesbitt was first appointed to the House in 1979 to fill out the remainder of the term of his mother, Mary Cordell Nesbitt, who held the House seat until her death. Groomed by one of North Carolina's most famous and influential politicians, Liston Ramsey, Nesbitt rose to become an appropriations chairman and top budget writer in the 1990s. Former Speaker of the House Jim Black (who was later incarcerated) found disfavor with Nesbitt after Nesbitt challenged his power in the early 2000s.

In February 2004, Martin Nesbitt was appointed to the North Carolina Senate by Governor Mike Easley to fill the vacant seat left by the resignation of Steve Metcalf. After moving to the Senate, Nesbitt rose to become chairman of the powerful Judiciary I Civil Committee.

Nesbitt was unanimously elected majority leader on November 17, 2009, replacing Tony Rand. Prior to his election, he received an endorsement from Senate President Pro Tempore Marc Basnight, a powerful nod in North Carolina politics. After Democrats lost their Senate majority in the 2010 elections, Nesbitt was unanimously elected minority leader for the next legislature. He stepped down as minority leader in 2014 for health reasons, and was succeeded by Sen. Daniel T. Blue Jr. Within two days of resigning from the leadership, Nesbitt died.

=== Committees ===
Nesbitt was in several senate committees:

- Appropriations/Base Budget
- Commerce
- Finance
- Judiciary I
- Mental Health & Youth Services
- Redistricting
- Rules and Operations of the Senate
- State and Local Government

== Education and personal life ==
Nesbitt earned his bachelor's degree from the University of North Carolina at Chapel Hill in 1970 and his law degree from UNC in 1973. He was married with two grown children and two grandchildren at the time of his death.

He died on March 6, 2014, one week after being diagnosed with stomach cancer. He was 67.

== Electoral history ==
=== 2012 ===
North Carolina Senate 49th district general election, 2012
Party	Candidate	Votes	%
Democratic	Martin Nesbitt (incumbent)	61,826	61.96%
Republican	R. L. Clark	37,953	38.04%
Total votes		99,779	100%
Democratic hold			

=== 2010 ===
North Carolina Senate 49th district general election, 2010
Party	Candidate	Votes	%
Democratic	Martin Nesbitt (incumbent)	33,254	59.37%
Republican	R. L. Clark	22,757	40.63%
Total votes		56,011	100%
Democratic hold			

=== 2008 ===
North Carolina Senate 49th district general election, 2008
Party	Candidate	Votes	%
Democratic	Martin Nesbitt (incumbent)	56,150	65.64%
Republican	R. L. Clark	29,391	34.36%
Total votes		85,541	100%
Democratic hold			

=== 2006 ===
North Carolina Senate 49th district general election, 2006
Party	Candidate	Votes	%
Democratic	Martin Nesbitt (incumbent)	36,901	65.64%
Republican	R. L. Clark	19,318	34.36%
Total votes		56,219	100%
Democratic hold			

=== 2004 ===
North Carolina Senate 49th district general election, 2004
Party	Candidate	Votes	%
Democratic	Martin Nesbitt (incumbent)	43,727	61.40%
Republican	R. L. Clark	27,492	38.60%
Total votes		71,669	100%
Democratic hold			

=== 2002 ===
North Carolina House of Representatives 114th district general election, 2002
Party	Candidate	Votes	%
Democratic	Martin Nesbitt (incumbent)	12,516	60.95%
Republican	Bill Porter	7,097	34.56%
Libertarian	Clarence Young	921	4.49%
Total votes		20,534	100%
Democratic hold			

== Legacy ==
Martin L. Nesbitt Discovery Academy, a STEM high school in Asheville, North Carolina, is named in his honor.

North Carolina House of Representatives
Preceded by Mary Cordell Nesbitt	Member of the North Carolina House of Representatives from the 43rd district 1979–1983; Served alongside: James McClure Clarke, Marie Colton, Gordon Hicks Greenwood, Narvel Crawford	Succeeded by Robert Brawley
Preceded by Constituency established	Member of the North Carolina House of Representatives from the 51st district 1983–1995; Served alongside: Marie Colton, Narvel Crawford, Gordon Hicks Greenwood	Succeeded by Lanier M. Cansler; Larry R. Linney; Wilma Sherrill
Preceded by Larry R. Linney	Member of the North Carolina House of Representatives from the 51st district 1997–2003; Served alongside: Lanier M. Cansler, Wilma Sherrill, Mark E. Crawford Jr.	Succeeded by John Sauls
Preceded by Constituency established	Member of the North Carolina House of Representatives from the 114th district 2003–2004	Succeeded by Susan Fisher
North Carolina Senate
Preceded by Steve Metcalf	Member of the North Carolina Senate from the 49th district 2004–2014	Succeeded by Terry Van Duyn
Preceded by Tony Rand	Majority Leader of the North Carolina Senate; 2009–2011	Succeeded by Harry Brown
Preceded by Phil Berger	Minority Leader of the North Carolina Senate; 2011–2014	Succeeded by Dan Blue
