= North Carolina's 43rd House district =

American legislative district

North Carolina's 43rd State House of Representatives district
Representative
Diane Wheatley; R–Linden
- Demographics: 53% White; 27% Black; 10% Hispanic; 1% Asian; 1% Native American; 1% Other; 6% Multiracial
- Population (2024): 88,154

North Carolina's 43rd House district is one of 120 districts in the North Carolina House of Representatives. It has been represented by Republican Diane Wheatley since 2021.

== Geography ==
Since 2003, the district has included part of Cumberland County. The district overlaps with the 19th and 21st Senate districts.

== District officeholders ==
=== Multi-member district ===
Representative	Party	Dates	Notes	Representative	Party	Dates	Notes	Representative	Party	Dates	Notes	Representative	Party	Dates	Notes	Counties
District created January 1, 1967.
Robert Falls (Shelby)	Democratic	January 1, 1967 – January 1, 1973	Redistricted from the Cleveland County district. Redistricted to the 40th district.	William Mauney Jr. (Kings Mountain)	Democratic	January 1, 1967 – January 1, 1973	Redistricted to the 40th district and retired.	William Harrill (Forest City)	Democratic	January 1, 1967 – January 1, 1969						1967–1973; All of Cleveland, Rutherford, and Polk counties.
Robert Falls (Shelby)	Democratic	January 1, 1967 – January 1, 1973	Redistricted from the Cleveland County district. Redistricted to the 40th district.	William Mauney Jr. (Kings Mountain)	Democratic	January 1, 1967 – January 1, 1973	Redistricted to the 40th district and retired.	Bob Jones (Forest City)	Democratic	January 1, 1969 – January 1, 1973	Redistricted to the 40th district.					1967–1973; All of Cleveland, Rutherford, and Polk counties.
Claude DeBruhl (Candler)	Democratic	January 1, 1973 – January 1, 1979	Redistricted from the 45th district.	Herschel Harkins (Asheville)	Democratic	January 1, 1973 – January 1, 1975	Redistricted from the 45th district.	Herbert Hyde (Asheville)	Democratic	January 1, 1973 – January 1, 1977		John Stevens (Asheville)	Democratic	January 1, 1973 – January 1, 1977	Redistricted from the 45th district.	1973–1983; All of Buncombe and Transylvania counties.
Claude DeBruhl (Candler)	Democratic	January 1, 1973 – January 1, 1979	Redistricted from the 45th district.	Mary Cordell Nesbitt (Asheville)	Democratic	January 1, 1975 – August 1, 1979	Died.	Herbert Hyde (Asheville)	Democratic	January 1, 1973 – January 1, 1977		John Stevens (Asheville)	Democratic	January 1, 1973 – January 1, 1977	Redistricted from the 45th district.	1973–1983; All of Buncombe and Transylvania counties.
Claude DeBruhl (Candler)	Democratic	January 1, 1973 – January 1, 1979	Redistricted from the 45th district.	Mary Cordell Nesbitt (Asheville)	Democratic	January 1, 1975 – August 1, 1979	Died.	James McClure Clarke (Fairview)	Democratic	January 1, 1977 – January 1, 1981	Retired to run for State Senate.	Gordon Greenwood (Black Mountain)	Democratic	January 1, 1977 – January 1, 1983	Redistricted to the 51st district.	1973–1983; All of Buncombe and Transylvania counties.
Marie Colton (Asheville)	Democratic	January 1, 1979 – January 1, 1983	Redistricted to the 51st district.	Mary Cordell Nesbitt (Asheville)	Democratic	January 1, 1975 – August 1, 1979	Died.	James McClure Clarke (Fairview)	Democratic	January 1, 1977 – January 1, 1981	Retired to run for State Senate.	Gordon Greenwood (Black Mountain)	Democratic	January 1, 1977 – January 1, 1983	Redistricted to the 51st district.	1973–1983; All of Buncombe and Transylvania counties.
Marie Colton (Asheville)	Democratic	January 1, 1979 – January 1, 1983	Redistricted to the 51st district.	Vacant		August 1, 1979 – September 13, 1979		James McClure Clarke (Fairview)	Democratic	January 1, 1977 – January 1, 1981	Retired to run for State Senate.	Gordon Greenwood (Black Mountain)	Democratic	January 1, 1977 – January 1, 1983	Redistricted to the 51st district.	1973–1983; All of Buncombe and Transylvania counties.
Marie Colton (Asheville)	Democratic	January 1, 1979 – January 1, 1983	Redistricted to the 51st district.	Martin Nesbitt (Asheville)	Democratic	September 13, 1979 – January 1, 1983	Appointed to finish Nesbitt's term. Redistricted to the 51st district.	James McClure Clarke (Fairview)	Democratic	January 1, 1977 – January 1, 1981	Retired to run for State Senate.	Gordon Greenwood (Black Mountain)	Democratic	January 1, 1977 – January 1, 1983	Redistricted to the 51st district.	1973–1983; All of Buncombe and Transylvania counties.
Marie Colton (Asheville)	Democratic	January 1, 1979 – January 1, 1983	Redistricted to the 51st district.	Martin Nesbitt (Asheville)	Democratic	September 13, 1979 – January 1, 1983	Appointed to finish Nesbitt's term. Redistricted to the 51st district.	Narvel Crawford (Asheville)	Democratic	January 1, 1981 – January 1, 1983	Redistricted to the 51st district.	Gordon Greenwood (Black Mountain)	Democratic	January 1, 1977 – January 1, 1983	Redistricted to the 51st district.	1973–1983; All of Buncombe and Transylvania counties.

=== Single-member district ===
Representative	Party	Dates	Notes	Counties
Robert Brawley (Mooresville)	Republican	January 1, 1983 – January 1, 1999	Redistricted from the 35th district.	1983–1993; Parts of Catawba, Iredell, and Alexander counties.
Robert Brawley (Mooresville)	Republican	January 1, 1983 – January 1, 1999	Redistricted from the 35th district.	1993–2003; Parts of Catawba and Iredell counties.
Mitchell Setzer (Catawba)	Republican	January 1, 1999 – January 1, 2003	Redistricted to the 89th district.	1993–2003; Parts of Catawba and Iredell counties.
Mary McAllister (Fayetteville)	Democratic	January 1, 2003 – January 1, 2009	Redistricted from the 17th district. Lost re-nomination.	2003–Present; Part of Cumberland County.
Elmer Floyd (Fayetteville)	Democratic	January 1, 2009 – January 1, 2021	Lost re-nomination.	2003–Present; Part of Cumberland County.
Diane Wheatley (Linden)	Republican	January 1, 2021 – Present		2003–Present; Part of Cumberland County.

== Election results ==
=== 2026 ===
North Carolina House of Representatives 43rd district Democratic primary election, 2026
Party	Candidate	Votes	%
Democratic	Janene Ackles	3,913	67.03%
Democratic	Ronald Pittman	1,925	32.97%
Total votes		5,838	100%

North Carolina House of Representatives 43rd district Republican primary election, 2026
Party	Candidate	Votes	%
Republican	Diane Wheatley (incumbent)	2,397	59.49%
Republican	Clarence Goins Jr.	1,632	40.51%
Total votes		4,029	100%

North Carolina House of Representatives 43rd district general election, 2026
Party	Candidate	Votes	%
Republican	Diane Wheatley (incumbent)		
Democratic	Janene Ackles		
Total votes			100%

=== 2024 ===
North Carolina House of Representatives 43rd district general election, 2024
Party	Candidate	Votes	%
Republican	Diane Wheatley (incumbent)	24,753	57.33%
Democratic	Janene (Dublin) Ackles	18,422	42.67%
Total votes		43,175	100%
Republican hold			

=== 2022 ===
North Carolina House of Representatives 43rd district Democratic primary election, 2022
Party	Candidate	Votes	%
Democratic	Elmer Floyd	3,581	59.93%
Democratic	Kimberly Hardy	2,150	35.98%
Democratic	Prince Christian	244	4.08%
Total votes		5,975	100%

North Carolina House of Representatives 43rd district Republican primary election, 2022
Party	Candidate	Votes	%
Republican	Diane Wheatley (incumbent)	2,297	51.32%
Republican	Clarence W. Goins Jr.	2,179	48.68%
Total votes		4,476	100%

North Carolina House of Representatives 43rd district general election, 2022
Party	Candidate	Votes	%
Republican	Diane Wheatley (incumbent)	14,389	54.99%
Democratic	Elmer Floyd	11,778	45.01%
Total votes		26,167	100%
Republican hold			

=== 2020 ===
North Carolina House of Representatives 43rd district Democratic primary election, 2020
Party	Candidate	Votes	%
Democratic	Kimberly Hardy	4,887	54.11%
Democratic	Elmer Floyd (incumbent)	4,144	45.89%
Total votes		9,031	100%

North Carolina House of Representatives 43rd district Republican primary election, 2020
Party	Candidate	Votes	%
Republican	Diane Wheatley	3,257	55.47%
Republican	Clarence Wilson Goins Jr.	2,615	44.53%
Total votes		5,872	100%

North Carolina House of Representatives 43rd district general election, 2020
Party	Candidate	Votes	%
Republican	Diane Wheatley	20,408	51.80%
Democratic	Kimberly Hardy	18,988	48.20%
Total votes		39,396	100%
Republican gain from Democratic			

=== 2018 ===
North Carolina House of Representatives 43rd district Democratic primary election, 2018
Party	Candidate	Votes	%
Democratic	Elmer Floyd (incumbent)	3,887	79.15%
Democratic	Theresa Gale	891	18.14%
Democratic	Prince Christian	133	2.71%
Total votes		4,911	100%

North Carolina House of Representatives 43rd district general election, 2018
Party	Candidate	Votes	%
Democratic	Elmer Floyd (incumbent)	16,175	74.13%
Republican	John Czajkowski	5,646	25.87%
Total votes		21,821	100%
Democratic hold			

=== 2016 ===
North Carolina House of Representatives 43rd district general election, 2016
Party	Candidate	Votes	%
Democratic	Elmer Floyd (incumbent)	27,121	100%
Total votes		27,121	100%
Democratic hold			

=== 2014 ===
North Carolina House of Representatives 43rd district general election, 2014
Party	Candidate	Votes	%
Democratic	Elmer Floyd (incumbent)	15,955	100%
Total votes		15,955	100%
Democratic hold			

=== 2012 ===
North Carolina House of Representatives 43rd district Republican primary election, 2012
Party	Candidate	Votes	%
Republican	Diana Carroll	1,433	51.47%
Republican	Michael Cole	1,351	48.53%
Total votes		2,784	100%

North Carolina House of Representatives 43rd district general election, 2012
Party	Candidate	Votes	%
Democratic	Elmer Floyd (incumbent)	23,832	69.58%
Republican	Diana Carroll	10,417	30.42%
Total votes		34,249	100%
Democratic hold			

=== 2010 ===
North Carolina House of Representatives 43rd district Democratic primary election, 2010
Party	Candidate	Votes	%
Democratic	Elmer Floyd (incumbent)	2,172	65.84%
Democratic	Mary McAllister	1,127	34.16%
Total votes		3,299	100%

North Carolina House of Representatives 43rd district general election, 2010
Party	Candidate	Votes	%
Democratic	Elmer Floyd (incumbent)	7,967	100%
Total votes		7,967	100%
Democratic hold			

=== 2008 ===
North Carolina House of Representatives 43rd district Democratic primary election, 2008
Party	Candidate	Votes	%
Democratic	Elmer Floyd	4,414	51.22%
Democratic	Mary McAllister (incumbent)	4,204	48.78%
Total votes		8,618	100%

North Carolina House of Representatives 43rd district general election, 2008
Party	Candidate	Votes	%
Democratic	Elmer Floyd	16,807	99.31%
Write-in		117	0.69%
Total votes		16,924	100%
Democratic hold			

=== 2006 ===
North Carolina House of Representatives 43rd district Democratic primary election, 2006
Party	Candidate	Votes	%
Democratic	Mary McAllister (incumbent)	1,679	59.73%
Democratic	Elmer Floyd	1,132	40.27%
Total votes		2,811	100%

North Carolina House of Representatives 43rd district general election, 2006
Party	Candidate	Votes	%
Democratic	Mary McAllister (incumbent)	5,645	100%
Total votes		5,645	100%
Democratic hold			

=== 2004 ===
North Carolina House of Representatives 43rd district Democratic primary election, 2004
Party	Candidate	Votes	%
Democratic	Mary McAllister (incumbent)	1,875	57.67%
Democratic	Elmer Floyd	1,376	42.33%
Total votes		3,251	100%

North Carolina House of Representatives 43rd district general election, 2004
Party	Candidate	Votes	%
Democratic	Mary McAllister (incumbent)	11,875	100%
Total votes		11,875	100%
Democratic hold			

=== 2002 ===
North Carolina House of Representatives 43rd district Democratic primary election, 2002
Party	Candidate	Votes	%
Democratic	Mary McAllister (incumbent)	2,744	60.56%
Democratic	Elmer Floyd	1,787	39.44%
Total votes		4,531	100%

North Carolina House of Representatives 43rd district general election, 2002
Party	Candidate	Votes	%
Democratic	Mary McAllister (incumbent)	7,008	100%
Total votes		7,008	100%
Democratic hold			

=== 2000 ===
North Carolina House of Representatives 43rd district general election, 2000
Party	Candidate	Votes	%
Republican	Mitchell Setzer (incumbent)	23,886	100%
Total votes		23,886	100%
Republican hold			
