= Wilma M. Sherrill =

American politician (1939–2025)

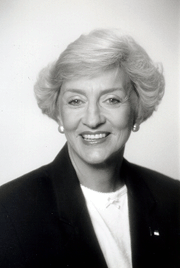

Member of the North Carolina House of Representatives
- In office January 1, 1995 – January 1, 2007 Serving with: Lanier Cansler (1995–2001); Larry Linney (1995–1997); Martin Nesbitt (1997–2003); Mark Crawford (2001–2003)
- Preceded by: Marie Colton
- Succeeded by: Charles Thomas
- Constituency: 51st district (1995–2003); 116th district (2003–2007)

Commissioner of the North Carolina Division of Motor Vehicles
- In office 1990–1991
- Governor: James G. Martin
- Preceded by: William S. Hiatt
- Succeeded by: Bob Hodges

Personal details
- Born: Wilma Money; August 9, 1939 Yadkin County, North Carolina, U.S.
- Died: December 18, 2025 (aged 86) Winston-Salem, North Carolina, U.S.
- Party: Republican
- Spouse: Jerry Sherrill
- Children: Jill S. Goins
- Education: Wake Forest University
- Occupation: Politician, booster

Wilma Money Sherrill (August 9, 1939 – December 18, 2025) was an American businesswoman and politician who was the Republican member of the North Carolina General Assembly from 1995 to 2006, representing the state's 51st and 116th districts, including constituents in Buncombe county.

== Early life and education ==
Wilma Money was born in Yadkin County, North Carolina, to William Hardy and Mozell Johnson Money. She graduated from West Yadkin High School and attended Elkin Business College and Wake Forest University. In 1966, she married Jerry Sherrill, with whom she had a daughter.

== Career ==
Sherrill began her long career as a businesswoman in 1967 when she moved with her husband to Asheville, North Carolina.

From 1985 to 1990, she worked as patronage chief in Governor James G. Martin's office.

From 1990 to 1991, she served as the commissioner of the North Carolina Division of Motor Vehicles.

Sherrill was elected to the North Carolina General Assembly assembly in 1994 and completed her sixth consecutive term in 2006. Major focuses during her tenure in office were education and domestic violence prevention.

One of Sherrill's most lasting accomplishments in the Assembly was shepherding into law the 1997-98 session NC House Bill 769, which provided funding for a new building at UNC Asheville that was subsequently named in her honor. The Wilma M. Sherrill Center houses the Health Sciences Department, the N.C. Center for Health and Wellness, and the Kimmel Arena. Sherrill served as a member of the Board of Trustees of the University of North Carolina at Asheville for nine years, on the Bulldog Athletic Association for over ten years, and for two years (2008-2009) as UNC Asheville’s Special Assistant to the Chancellor on External Affairs, among other positions in support of the university.

== Death ==
Sherrill died in Winston-Salem, North Carolina, on December 18, 2025, at the age of 86. A memorial service is scheduled in the Wilma M. Sherrill Center at the University of North Carolina at Asheville.

North Carolina House of Representatives
| Preceded by Marie Colton; Narvel Crawford; Martin Nesbitt | Member of the North Carolina House of Representatives from the 51st district 1995–2003; Served alongside: Lanier M. Cansler, Larry R. Linney, Martin Nesbitt, Mark E. Crawford Jr. | Succeeded by John Sauls |
| Preceded by Constituency established | Member of the North Carolina House of Representatives from the 116th district 2003–2007 | Succeeded by Charles Thomas |
