= Narvel =

Narvel is a given name. People with the name include:

- Narvel Blackstock, former husband of Reba McEntire
- Narvel J. Crawford (1929–2021), former member of the North Carolina House of Representatives.
- Narvel Felts (born 1938), American country music singer

== See also ==
- Navel
