= North Carolina's 51st House district =

American legislative district

North Carolina's 51st State House of Representatives district
Representative
John Sauls; R–Sanford
- Demographics: 61% White; 16% Black; 18% Hispanic; 1% Asian; 5% Multiracial
- Population (2024): 86,421

North Carolina's 51st House district is one of 120 districts in the North Carolina House of Representatives. It has been represented by Republican John Sauls since 2017.

== Geography ==
Since 2023, the district has included all of Lee County, as well as part of Moore County. The district overlaps with the 12th and 21st Senate districts.

== District officeholders ==
=== Multi-member district ===
Representative	Party	Dates	Notes	Representative	Party	Dates	Notes	Representative	Party	Dates	Notes	Representative	Party	Dates	Notes	Counties
District created January 1, 1983.
Marie Colton (Asheville)	Democratic	January 1, 1983 – January 1, 1995	Redistricted from the 43rd district.	Martin Nesbitt (Asheville)	Democratic	January 1, 1983 – January 1, 1995	Redistricted from the 43rd district. Lost re-election.	Narvel Crawford (Asheville)	Democratic	January 1, 1983 – January 1, 1995	Redistricted from the 43rd district.	Gordon Greenwood (Black Mountain)	Democratic	January 1, 1983 – January 1, 1993	Redistricted from the 43rd district.	1983–1993; All of Buncombe and Transylvania counties. Part of Henderson County.
Marie Colton (Asheville)	Democratic	January 1, 1983 – January 1, 1995	Redistricted from the 43rd district.	Martin Nesbitt (Asheville)	Democratic	January 1, 1983 – January 1, 1995	Redistricted from the 43rd district. Lost re-election.	Narvel Crawford (Asheville)	Democratic	January 1, 1983 – January 1, 1995	Redistricted from the 43rd district.					1993–2003; Part of Buncombe County.
Wilma Sherill (Asheville)	Republican	January 1, 1995 – January 1, 2003	Redistricted to the 116th district.	Larry Linney (Asheville)	Republican	January 1, 1995 – January 1, 1997	Lost re-election.	Lanier Cansler (Asheville)	Republican	January 1, 1995 – April 8, 2001	Resigned.					1993–2003; Part of Buncombe County.
Wilma Sherill (Asheville)	Republican	January 1, 1995 – January 1, 2003	Redistricted to the 116th district.	Martin Nesbitt (Asheville)	Democratic	January 1, 1997 – January 1, 2003	Redistricted to the 114th district.	Lanier Cansler (Asheville)	Republican	January 1, 1995 – April 8, 2001	Resigned.					1993–2003; Part of Buncombe County.
Wilma Sherill (Asheville)	Republican	January 1, 1995 – January 1, 2003	Redistricted to the 116th district.	Martin Nesbitt (Asheville)	Democratic	January 1, 1997 – January 1, 2003	Redistricted to the 114th district.	Vacant		April 8, 2001 – April 11, 2001						1993–2003; Part of Buncombe County.
Wilma Sherill (Asheville)	Republican	January 1, 1995 – January 1, 2003	Redistricted to the 116th district.	Martin Nesbitt (Asheville)	Democratic	January 1, 1997 – January 1, 2003	Redistricted to the 114th district.	Mark Crawford (Montreat)	Republican	April 11, 2001 – January 1, 2003	Appointed to finish Cansler's term. Redistricted to the 115th district and lost re-election.					1993–2003; Part of Buncombe County.

=== Single-member district ===
Representative	Party	Dates	Notes	Counties
John Sauls (Sanford)	Republican	January 1, 2003 – January 1, 2007	Retired.	2003–2005; All of Lee County. Parts of Harnett and Moore counties.
John Sauls (Sanford)	Republican	January 1, 2003 – January 1, 2007	Retired.	2005–2013; All of Lee County. Part of Harnett County.
Jimmy Love Sr. (Sanford)	Democratic	January 1, 2007 – January 1, 2011	Lost re-election.	2005–2013; All of Lee County. Part of Harnett County.
Mike Stone (Sanford)	Republican	January 1, 2011 – January 1, 2015	Lost re-election.	2005–2013; All of Lee County. Part of Harnett County.
Mike Stone (Sanford)	Republican	January 1, 2011 – January 1, 2015	Lost re-election.	2013–2019; Parts of Lee and Harnett counties.
Brad Salmon (Mamers)	Democratic	January 1, 2015 – January 1, 2017	Lost re-election.	2013–2019; Parts of Lee and Harnett counties.
John Sauls (Sanford)	Republican	January 1, 2017 – Present	Retiring.	2013–2019; Parts of Lee and Harnett counties.
John Sauls (Sanford)	Republican	January 1, 2017 – Present	Retiring.	2019–2023; All of Lee County. Part of Harnett County.
John Sauls (Sanford)	Republican	January 1, 2017 – Present	Retiring.	2023–Present; All of Lee County; Part of Moore County.

== Election results ==
=== 2026 ===
North Carolina House of Representatives 51st district Republican primary election, 2026
Party	Candidate	Votes	%
Republican	Charles Taylor	3,005	54.16%
Republican	Sherry Lynn Womack	2,543	45.84%
Total votes		5,548	100%

North Carolina House of Representatives 51st district general election, 2026
Party	Candidate	Votes	%
Republican	Charles Taylor		
Democratic	Tasherra Nichols McDuffie		
Total votes			100%

=== 2024 ===
North Carolina House of Representatives 51st district general election, 2024
Party	Candidate	Votes	%
Republican	John Sauls (incumbent)	25,829	64.30%
Democratic	Ginger Bauerband	14,339	35.70%
Total votes		40,168	100%
Republican hold			

=== 2022 ===
North Carolina House of Representatives 51st district general election, 2022
Party	Candidate	Votes	%
Republican	John Sauls (incumbent)	16,973	64.98%
Democratic	Malcolm Hall	9,147	35.02%
Total votes		26,120	100%
Republican hold			

=== 2020 ===
North Carolina House of Representatives 51st district general election, 2020
Party	Candidate	Votes	%
Republican	John Sauls (incumbent)	22,628	57.33%
Democratic	Jason Cain	16,841	42.67%
Total votes		39,469	100%
Republican hold			

=== 2018 ===
North Carolina House of Representatives 51st district general election, 2018
Party	Candidate	Votes	%
Republican	John Sauls (incumbent)	13,707	52.79%
Democratic	Lisa D. Mathis	12,259	47.21%
Total votes		25,966	100%
Republican hold			

=== 2016 ===
North Carolina House of Representatives 51st district general election, 2016
Party	Candidate	Votes	%
Republican	John Sauls	17,904	55.66%
Democratic	Brad Salmon (incumbent)	14,262	44.34%
Total votes		32,166	100%
Republican gain from Democratic			

=== 2014 ===
North Carolina House of Representatives 51st district general election, 2014
Party	Candidate	Votes	%
Democratic	Brad Salmon	10,755	53.94%
Republican	Mike Stone (incumbent)	9,182	46.06%
Total votes		19,937	100%
Democratic gain from Republican			

=== 2012 ===
North Carolina House of Representatives 51st district general election, 2012
Party	Candidate	Votes	%
Republican	Mike Stone (incumbent)	15,764	52.03%
Democratic	W. P. "Bill" Tatum	14,533	47.97%
Total votes		30,297	100%
Republican hold			

=== 2010 ===
North Carolina House of Representatives 51st district general election, 2010
Party	Candidate	Votes	%
Republican	Mike Stone	10,793	53.53%
Democratic	Jimmy Love Sr. (incumbent)	9,370	46.47%
Total votes		20,163	100%
Republican gain from Democratic			

=== 2008 ===
North Carolina House of Representatives 51st district general election, 2008
Party	Candidate	Votes	%
Democratic	Jimmy Love Sr. (incumbent)	19,231	59.18%
Republican	Linda Shook	13,264	40.82%
Total votes		32,495	100%
Democratic hold			

=== 2006 ===
North Carolina House of Representatives 51st district Republican primary election, 2006
Party	Candidate	Votes	%
Republican	Tim McNeill	1,121	59.09%
Republican	Bobby Ray Hall	776	40.91%
Total votes		1,897	100%

North Carolina House of Representatives 51st district general election, 2006
Party	Candidate	Votes	%
Democratic	Jimmy Love Sr.	8,724	54.16%
Republican	Tim McNeill	7,383	45.84%
Total votes		16,107	100%
Democratic gain from Republican			

=== 2004 ===
North Carolina House of Representatives 51st district general election, 2004
Party	Candidate	Votes	%
Republican	John Sauls (incumbent)	13,255	50.74%
Democratic	Leslie Cox	12,869	49.26%
Total votes		26,124	100%
Republican hold			

=== 2002 ===
North Carolina House of Representatives 51st district general election, 2002
Party	Candidate	Votes	%
Republican	John Sauls	8,500	51.14%
Democratic	Leslie Cox (incumbent)	7,819	47.04%
Libertarian	Mark Jackson	302	1.82%
Total votes		16,621	100%
Republican gain from Democratic			

=== 2000 ===
North Carolina House of Representatives 51st district Democratic primary election, 2000
Party	Candidate	Votes	%
Democratic	Martin Nesbitt (incumbent)	9,617	31.76%
Democratic	Barbara Field	8,668	28.62%
Democratic	J. Ray Elingburg	7,520	24.83%
Democratic	C. Michael Morgan	4,477	14.78%
Total votes		30,282	100%

North Carolina House of Representatives 51st district general election, 2000
Party	Candidate	Votes	%
Republican	Wilma Sherrill (incumbent)	41,402	19.18%
Democratic	Martin Nesbitt (incumbent)	38,594	17.88%
Republican	Lanier Cansler (incumbent)	38,041	17.63%
Democratic	Barbara Field	32,224	14.93%
Democratic	J. Ray Elingburg	29,951	13.88%
Republican	Betty B. Williams	28,384	13.15%
Reform	Kristina Michele Murphy	3,593	1.67%
Reform	Lance Kurland	1,836	0.85%
Reform	Jerold F. Johnson	1,811	0.84%
Total votes		215,836	100%
Republican hold			
Democratic hold			
Republican hold			
