= Mary E. McAllister =

American politician (1937–2020)

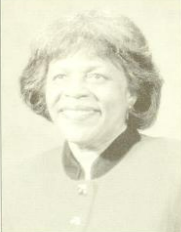
McAllister in the 2001 legislative manual

Mary E. McAllister (April 20, 1937 – August 20, 2020) was a Democratic member of the North Carolina General Assembly representing the state's forty-third House district, including constituents in Cumberland county. As of the 2003–04 session, McAllister was serving in her seventh term in the state House. She was an executive from Fayetteville, North Carolina.

== Electoral history ==
=== 2010 ===
North Carolina House of Representatives 43rd district Democratic primary election, 2010
| Party | Candidate | Votes | % |
|---|---|---|---|
| Democratic | Elmer Floyd (incumbent) | 2,172 | 65.84% |
| Democratic | Mary McAllister | 1,127 | 34.16% |
| Total votes | | 3,299 | 100% |

=== 2008 ===
North Carolina House of Representatives 43rd district Democratic primary election, 2008
| Party | Candidate | Votes | % |
|---|---|---|---|
| Democratic | Elmer Floyd | 4,414 | 51.22% |
| Democratic | Mary McAllister (incumbent) | 4,204 | 48.78% |
| Total votes | | 8,618 | 100% |

=== 2006 ===
North Carolina House of Representatives 43rd district Democratic primary election, 2006
| Party | Candidate | Votes | % |
|---|---|---|---|
| Democratic | Mary McAllister (incumbent) | 1,679 | 59.73% |
| Democratic | Elmer Floyd | 1,132 | 40.27% |
| Total votes | | 2,811 | 100% |

North Carolina House of Representatives 43rd district general election, 2006
| Party | Candidate | Votes | % |
|---|---|---|---|
| Democratic | Mary McAllister (incumbent) | 5,645 | 100% |
| Total votes | | 5,645 | 100% |
| Democratic hold | | | |

=== 2004 ===
North Carolina House of Representatives 43rd district Democratic primary election, 2004
| Party | Candidate | Votes | % |
|---|---|---|---|
| Democratic | Mary McAllister (incumbent) | 1,875 | 57.67% |
| Democratic | Elmer Floyd | 1,376 | 42.33% |
| Total votes | | 3,251 | 100% |

North Carolina House of Representatives 43rd district general election, 2004
| Party | Candidate | Votes | % |
|---|---|---|---|
| Democratic | Mary McAllister (incumbent) | 11,875 | 100% |
| Total votes | | 11,875 | 100% |
| Democratic hold | | | |

=== 2002 ===
North Carolina House of Representatives 43rd district Democratic primary election, 2002
| Party | Candidate | Votes | % |
|---|---|---|---|
| Democratic | Mary McAllister (incumbent) | 2,744 | 60.56% |
| Democratic | Elmer Floyd | 1,787 | 39.44% |
| Total votes | | 4,531 | 100% |

North Carolina House of Representatives 43rd district general election, 2002
| Party | Candidate | Votes | % |
|---|---|---|---|
| Democratic | Mary McAllister (incumbent) | 7,008 | 100% |
| Total votes | | 7,008 | 100% |
| Democratic hold | | | |

=== 2000 ===
North Carolina House of Representatives 17th district Democratic primary election, 2000
| Party | Candidate | Votes | % |
|---|---|---|---|
| Democratic | Mary McAllister (incumbent) | 3,472 | 38.56% |
| Democratic | Marvin Lucas | 2,441 | 27.11% |
| Democratic | Theodore James Kinney (incumbent) | 1,718 | 19.08% |
| Democratic | David K. Hasan | 1,374 | 15.26% |
| Total votes | | 9,005 | 100% |

North Carolina House of Representatives 17th district general election, 2000
| Party | Candidate | Votes | % |
|---|---|---|---|
| Democratic | Marvin Lucas | 12,520 | 42.05% |
| Democratic | Mary McAllister (incumbent) | 12,141 | 40.77% |
| Republican | George E. Boggs | 5,115 | 17.18% |
| Total votes | | 29,776 | 100% |
| Democratic hold | | | |
| Democratic hold | | | |

North Carolina House of Representatives
| Preceded by Chancy Rudolph Edwards | Member of the North Carolina House of Representatives from the 17th district 1991-2003; Served alongside: Luther Reginald Jeralds, Theodore James Kinney, Larry Shaw, Marvin Lucas | Succeeded by Bonner Stiller |
| Preceded by Mitchell Setzer | Member of the North Carolina House of Representatives from the 43rd district 2003-2009 | Succeeded by Elmer Floyd |
