= John I. Sauls =

American politician (born 1949)

John Sauls
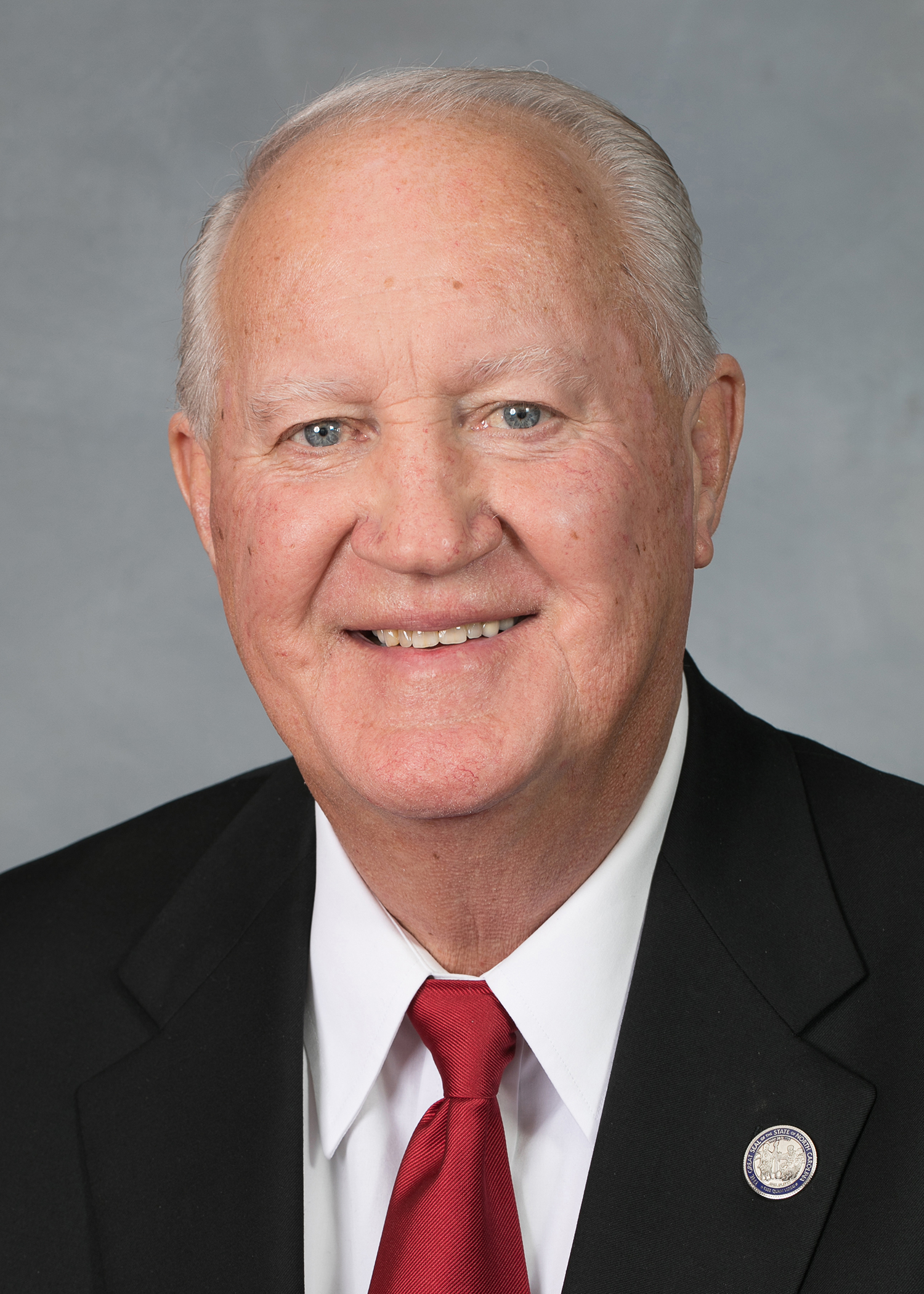

Member of the North Carolina House of Representatives from the 51st district
- Incumbent
- Assumed office January 1, 2017
- Preceded by: Brad Salmon
- In office January 1, 2003 – January 1, 2007
- Preceded by: Leslie Cox (Redistricting)
- Succeeded by: Jimmy Love

Personal details
- Born: John Irwin Sauls II; November 29, 1949 (age 76) Wilson, North Carolina, U.S.
- Party: Republican
- Spouse: Mardie
- Children: 3
- Occupation: pastor

John Irwin Sauls II (born November 29, 1949) is a Republican member of the North Carolina House of Representatives. A pastor from Sanford, North Carolina and former Lee County Commissioner, he has represented the 51st district (including constituents in Lee and Harnett counties) since 2017. When Sauls returned to the NC House in 2017, he held the position of Republican Freshman Chair. He has been elected to the NC House a total of 5 times, most recently in 2022.

== Personal life ==
Sauls' son, John Sauls III or "Pastor J3" took over Sauls position as lead pastor at Crossroads Ministries in 2016. Sauls is a Vietnam-era veteran.

== Political career ==
Sauls claimed he was ready to run for commissioner when he was approached by Lee County GOP in 1997 because “God had prepared [him] for it.” Sauls won by a close margin to join the NC House in both 2002 and 2004. In 2016, Sauls ran for House District 51 yet again, and flipped the district when he beat Democratic incumbent Brad Salmon.

== Political positions ==
=== Education ===
Sauls voted for the 2017 Republican budget and voted to override the governor’s veto. Starting teacher pay remains at $35,000 under the Republican budget. Many educators, including veterans of 25 years, will only see an increase of $30 a month, merely a tank of gas. Sauls voted “yes” to H13, which capped K-3 class sizes at 22 to 24 students, without providing adequate funding to support the bill. The mandate for smaller class sizes will cost North Carolina school districts as much as $388 million more per year.

=== Public Facilities Privacy & Security Act ===
Though he was not in office for the passage of House Bill 2, Sauls did say he supported the "bathroom part." His only criticism of the bill was the manner in which it was passed. Sauls voted to pass House Bill 142, also known as the “HB2 Compromise,” despite pushback from conservative groups that have endorsed him in the past.

=== Alcohol consumption and gambling ===
Sauls voted “no” on H500, an alcoholic beverage control omnibus bill that would ease regulations on North Carolina’s numerous micro-breweries. Three weeks after it was introduced House Bill 500 was gutted despite support from the state’s more than 200 craft brewers. Sauls voted against S155, the “Brunch Bill,” which allows vendors to sell alcoholic beverages before 10 a.m. on Sunday. Sauls said he couldn’t support the bill “personally.” As a pastor, Sauls doesn't condemn alcohol drinkers but has "preached too many funerals that were alcohol related." John Sauls “had several motor vehicle accidents when…[he] was drinking.” Sauls opposed establishing a state-run education lottery and compared using a lottery to fund education to a “drug dealer who keep selling drugs instead of taking a job.”

=== Reproductive rights ===
Sauls voted for the 2017 Republican budget which allocated money to crisis pregnancy centers, clinics that “discourage women from getting abortions would receive a big boost in state financial support.” Sauls voted to table a budget amendment that would redirect money from the Carolina Pregnancy Care Fellowship to the Department of Health and Human Services.

=== Environment ===
Sauls voted for H56, a bill that repealed the Outer Banks plastic bag ban and was called the “junk drawer of environmental laws.” Republican legislators tied funding to monitor GenX in the Cape Fear River to a repeal of the coastal ban on plastic bags. The bill directs $185K to the Cape Fear Public Utility Authority and $250K to the UNCW to monitor and study GenX despite Gov. Cooper asked for $2.6 million in funding. H56 repealed the plastic bag ban in the Outer Banks that had been in effect since 2009 to protect animals like sea turtles. Sauls voted for S131, which deregulated policies that were meant to protect stream beds, beaches and air quality. Sauls voted for H576, which would have allowed the spraying of "garbage juice" without a permit. H576 would allow landfill operators to “dispose” of landfill fluids by “spraying it into the air over their property” without a permit. Communities where over half the residents are people of color are 2.8 more likely to be near a solid waste facility, according to research published in Environmental Health Perspectives. Sauls voted for S16, a business regulatory reform bill that “imposes limitations on local governments’ power over landfill permits.” Senate Bill 16 is a “16-page grab bag of deregulation provisions. It loosens water quality rules and imposes limitations on local governments power over landfill permits, changes that the Democratic governor called dangerous in his veto message.”

=== Voter ID ===
In a statement to the Sanford Herald, Sauls said he has “never understood the opposition” to voter ID requirements. Sauls said he doesn’t “see how a statewide election law can target African-Americans.”

== Committee assignments ==
=== 2023-2024 Session ===
- Commerce Committee (Chair)
- Education - Community Colleges Committee
- Energy and Public Utilities Committee
- Ethics Committee (Chair)
- House Finance Committee

=== 2021-2022 Session ===
- Commerce (Chair)
- Ethics (Chair)
- Education - Community Colleges (Vice Chair)
- Education - K-12
- Energy and Public Utilities
- Finance
- Redistricting

=== 2019-2020 Session ===
- Appropriations (Vice Chair)
- Appropriations - Education (Chair)
- Ethics (Chair)
- Education - Community Colleges (Chair)
- Redistricting (Vice Chair)
- Energy and Public Utilities
- Judiciary

=== 2017-2018 Session ===
- Appropriations
- Appropriations - Education
- Appropriations - Health and Human Services
- Education - Community Colleges (Chair)
- Energy and Public Utilities
- Judiciary II
- Commerce and Job Development
- State and Local Government II

== Electoral history ==
=== 2020 ===
North Carolina House of Representatives 51st district general election, 2020
Party	Candidate	Votes	%
Republican	John Sauls (incumbent)	22,628	57.33%
Democratic	Jason Cain	16,841	42.67%
Total votes		39,469	100%
Republican hold			

=== 2018 ===
North Carolina House of Representatives 51st district general election, 2018
Party	Candidate	Votes	%
Republican	John Sauls (incumbent)	13,707	52.79%
Democratic	Lisa D. Mathis	12,259	47.21%
Total votes		25,966	100%
Republican hold			

=== 2016 ===
North Carolina House of Representatives 51st district general election, 2016
Party	Candidate	Votes	%
Republican	John Sauls	17,904	55.66%
Democratic	Brad Salmon (incumbent)	14,262	44.34%
Total votes		32,166	100%
Republican gain from Democratic			

=== 2004 ===
North Carolina House of Representatives 51st district general election, 2004
Party	Candidate	Votes	%
Republican	John Sauls (incumbent)	13,255	50.74%
Democratic	Leslie Cox	12,869	49.26%
Total votes		26,124	100%
Republican hold			

=== 2002 ===
North Carolina House of Representatives 51st district general election, 2002
Party	Candidate	Votes	%
Republican	John Sauls	8,500	51.14%
Democratic	Leslie Cox (incumbent)	7,819	47.04%
Libertarian	Mark Jackson	302	1.82%
Total votes		16,621	100%
Republican gain from Democratic			

North Carolina House of Representatives
Preceded by Wilma Sherrill; Martin Nesbitt; Mark Crawford	Member of the North Carolina House of Representatives from the 51st district 2003–2007	Succeeded by Jimmy Love
Preceded by Brad Salmon	Member of the North Carolina House of Representatives from the 51st district 2017–present	Incumbent
