= Mike C. Stone =

American politician

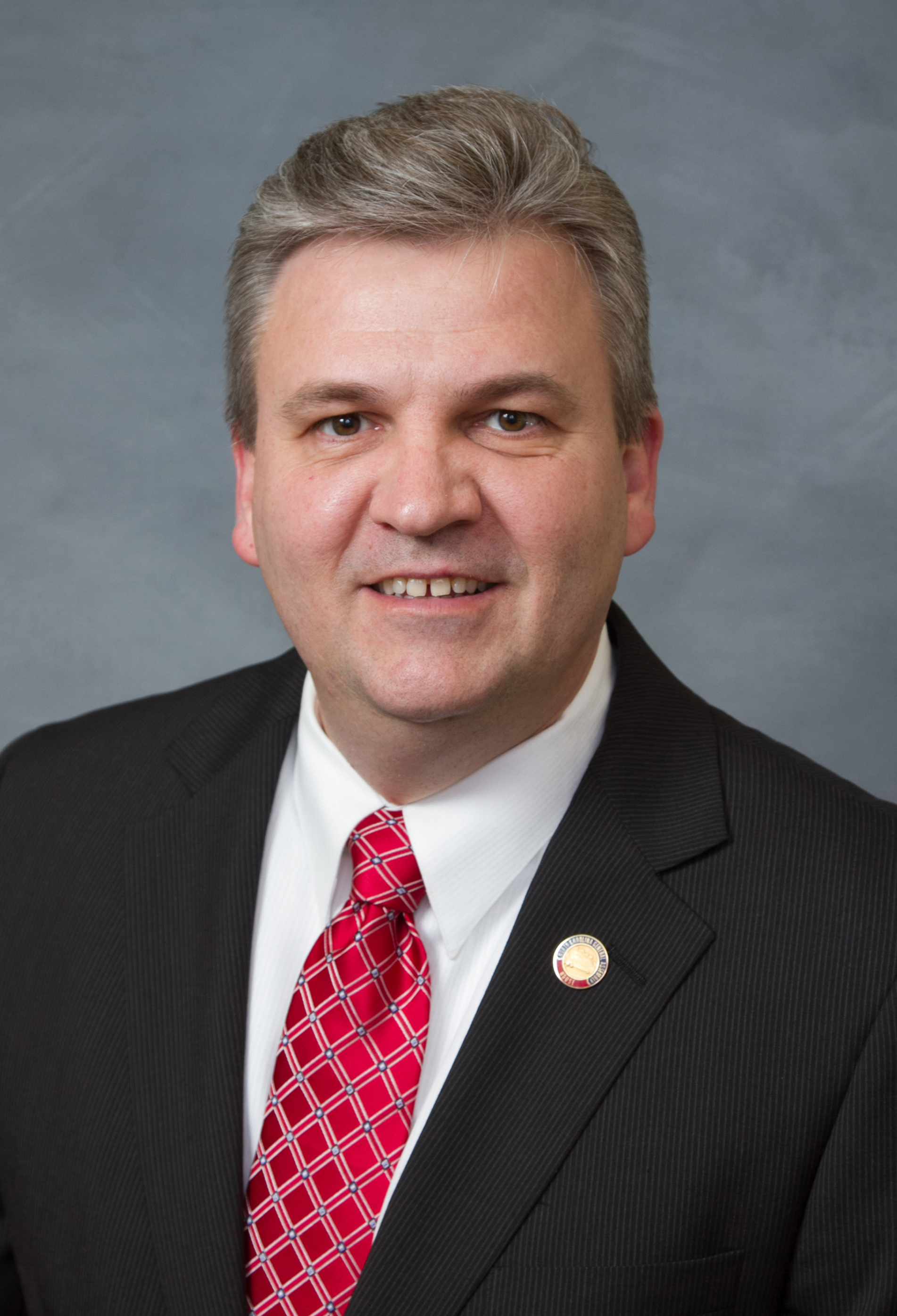

Member of the North Carolina House of Representatives from the 51st district
- In office January 1, 2011 – January 1, 2015
- Preceded by: Jimmy Love
- Succeeded by: Brad Salmon

Member of the Sanford City Council
- In office 2006–2011
- Succeeded by: Samuel Gaskins

Personal details
- Born: January 9, 1970 (age 56)
- Party: Republican
- Spouse: Jennifer Womble Stone

Michael C. "Mike" Stone (born January 9, 1970) is an American businessman and political figure from Sanford, North Carolina. He represented the 51st House District in the North Carolina General Assembly before being defeated in 2014 by an 8 point margin.

== Career ==
Stone is a businessman who owned O'Connell's Supermarket in Sanford before it shut down in 2014. He currently owns a number of rental properties. In 2010, Stone ran for the House of Representative, defeating Jimmy Love Sr. to take a seat. In 2011, Stone made news when he protested that his then-8-year-old daughter was part of a class-assigned letter writing campaign corresponding with him to protest budget cuts.

In 2012, Stone began his second term. In 2013, he introduced several politically contentious bills, among them to switch Sanford city and Lee County school boards from non-partisan to partisan, and to shift the responsibility for assigning school resource officers from the school board to the sheriff's office. A third bill passed by legislation to change the members of the Central Carolina Community College board of trustees by removing those four members who had been appointed by the Lee County school board and dividing their seats among the school boards of Lee, Chatham and Harnett counties has resulted in a lawsuit, with the trustees seeking to block their removal.

Stone was defeated by Brad Salmon (D) by eight points in the November 2014 General Election despite a national Republican wave and politically advantageous district.

== Bills Introduced ==
Stone has introduced over 70 bills into the North Carolina General Assembly. These range from bills honoring boy scouts and fallen soldiers, to bills defending gun-ownership rights. They include:

- Honor Representative Wainwright.
- Honor Representative Larry Brown.
- NC Right to Work/Secret Ballot Amendments.
- Eminent Domain.
- Special Election Dates.
- State Agency Property Use/Biennial Report.
- No N.C. Exchange/No Medicaid Expansion.
- Gun Permits/Confidentiality.
- Jt Session/State Bd of Ed Confirmation.(re-introduced)
- Joint Session/State Bd of Ed Confirmation.
- Repeal Combined M.V. Registration/Tax System.
- Honor Joe Hege.
- Firearm in Locked Motor Vehicle/Parking Lot.
- Honor Don East.
- Increase Access To Career/Technical Ed.
- Honor Boy Scouts.
- NC Right to Work/Secret Ballot Amendments.
- Reform Workforce Development.
- Amend State Contract Review Laws.
- Nonprofit Grants/Increase Accountability.
- Eliminate Safety Insp./Emission Insp. Req.
- Reform Oversight of State-Owned Vehicles.
- Support Right to Bear Arms.
- Honor Legislative Bldg's 50th Anniversary.
- Restore Partisan Judicial Elections.
- Regulatory Reform Act of 2013.
- Annexation Amendment.
- Special License Plate Development Process.
- Public Contracts/Project Labor.
- Consular Documents Not Acceptable as ID.
- Joint Resolution Requesting Balanced Budget.
- Public Contracts/Illegal Immigrants.
- Eliminate Obsolete Boards and Commissions.
- Honor Fallen Soldiers.
- Amend Certificate of Need Laws.
- Study Savings for Administration of Claims.
- Clarify Read to Achieve/Sch. Perform. Grades.
- Maintaining Water & Sewer Fiscal Health.
- Nonresident Scholarships/Out-of-State Tuition.
- The Gun Rights Amendment.
- Freedom to Negotiate Health Care Rates.
- Taxpayer Debt Information Act.
- Charter School Enrollment & Charter Revisions.
- Children w/Disabilities Scholarship Grants.
- Taxpayer Bill of Rights.
- Banking Laws Clarifications/Corrections.
- Affordable and Reliable Energy Act.
- Expand District Judge Eligibility.
- Modify Internal Auditing Statutes.
- Lee County Elections.
- School Resource Officers/Lee County.
- Noncovered Vision Services.
- Central Carolina Com. Coll. Trustee Elections.
- Clarify Dealer Plates Law.
- Second Amendment Protection Act.
- State's Right to Claim Sovereignty.
- Notify Law Enforcement of Towed Vehicles.
- Property Owners Protection Act/Study.
- County and City Ethics.
- Consolidation of Certain Fire Districts.
- NC Seafood Park/Name Change.
- Family, Faith, and Freedom Protection Act.
- Study Public Enterprise Systems/Use of Funds.
- Define Parental Rights Standard/Statutory Law.
- Clarify Law/Prohibit Sex-Selective Abortion.
- Interstate Agreements to Improve Voter Rolls.
- Worthless Check/Present Cashed Check.
- RECLAIM NC Act.
- Incentives Study Bill.
- Study Water & Sewer Service Districts.
- Three-Fifths Vote to Levy Taxes.
- Taxpayer Transparency Act.
- Support Restoration of Glass-Steagall Act.
- Government Transparency Act.
- Eliminate Tax Designation for Political Party.
- Replace CCSS w/NC's Higher Academ. Standards.
- Amend Definition of Dangerous Firearm.
- Honor Jim Fulghum.

North Carolina House of Representatives
Preceded by Jimmy Love	Member of the North Carolina House of Representatives from the 51st district 2011-2015	Succeeded by Brad Salmon
