= Elmer Floyd =

American politician from North Carolina (born 1948)

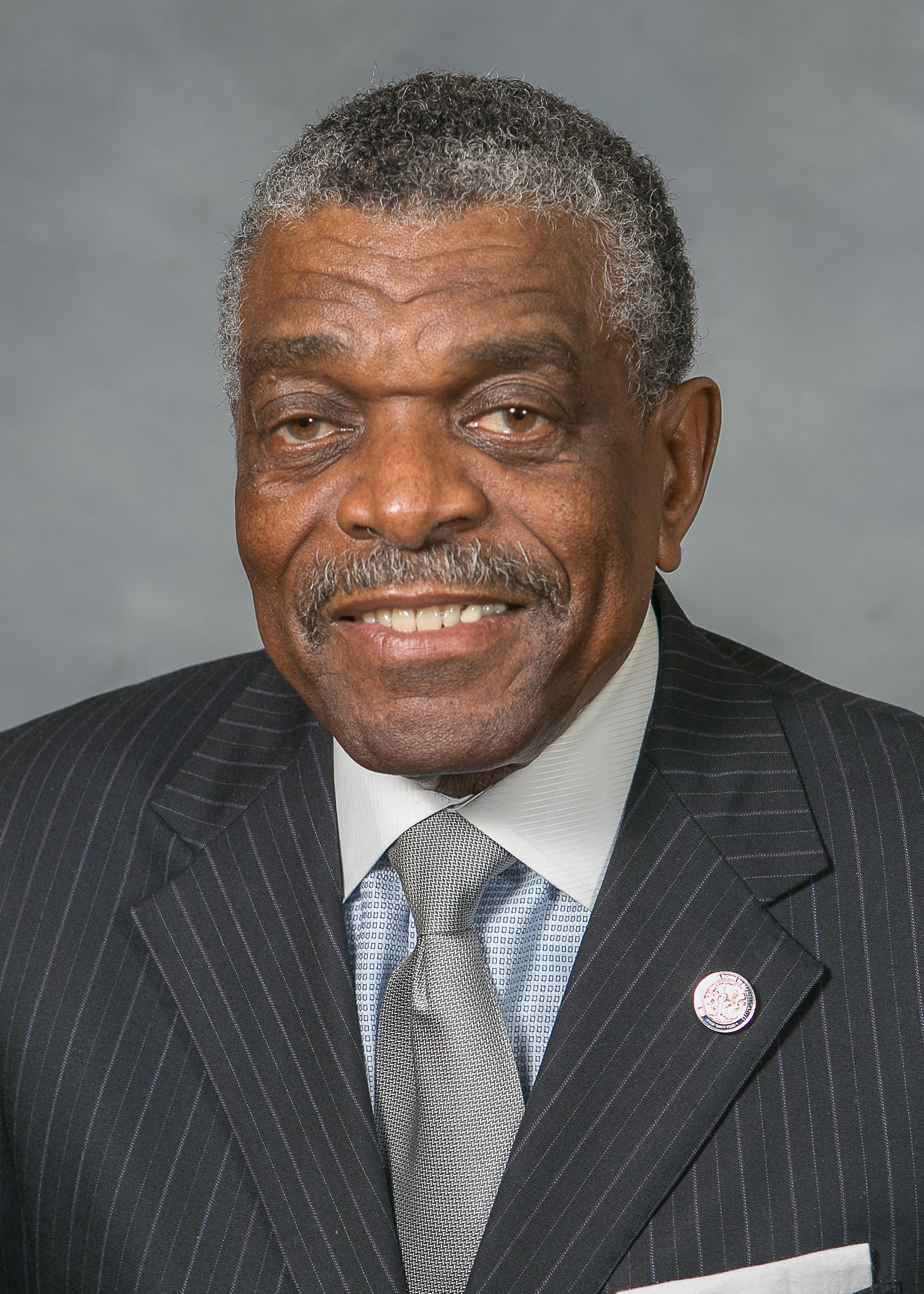

Member of the North Carolina House of Representatives from the 43rd district
- In office January 1, 2009 – January 1, 2021
- Preceded by: Mary McAllister
- Succeeded by: Diane Wheatley

Personal details
- Born: April 20, 1948 (age 78)
- Party: Democratic
- Spouse: Dorothy
- Children: 4
- Education: Fayetteville State University (BS)

Elmer Floyd (born April 20, 1948) is a former Democratic member of the North Carolina House of Representatives. He represented the 43rd district (containing parts of Cumberland County) from 2009 until 2021. Floyd is African-American.

During the 2016 legislative session, Floyd was one of 11 Democrats to vote in favor of House Bill 2, the controversial "Bathroom Bill." In 2020, Floyd lost the Democratic primary for his (somewhat redrawn) seat to progressive Kimberly Hardy, who then lost the general election.

== Committee assignments ==
=== 2019-2020 session ===
- Appropriations
- Appropriations - General Government (Vice Chair)
- Ethics (Vice Chair)
- Redistricting (Vice Chair)
- Election Law and Campaign Finance Reform
- Insurance
- Rules, Calendar, and Operations of the House

=== 2017-2018 session ===
- Appropriations
- Appropriations - General Government
- Elections and Ethics Law
- Rules, Calendar, and Operations of the House
- Commerce and Job Development
- Homeland Security, Military, and Veterans Affairs
- Regulatory Reform
- University Board of Governors Nominating

=== 2015-2016 session ===
- Appropriations
- Appropriations - General Government (Vice Chair)
- Elections
- Rules, Calendar, and Operations of the House
- Commerce and Job Development
- Homeland Security, Military, and Veterans Affairs
- Local Government
- State Personnel

=== 2013-2014 session ===
- Appropriations
- Elections
- Insurance
- Rules, Calendar, and Operations of the House
- Commerce and Job Development
- Homeland Security, Military, and Veterans Affairs
- Government
- State Personnel

=== 2011-2012 session ===
- Appropriations
- Elections
- Insurance
- Commerce and Job Development
- Homeland Security, Military, and Veterans Affairs
- Government
- State Personnel

=== 2009-2010 session ===
- Appropriations
- Commerce, Small Business, and Entrepreneurship
- Homeland Security, Military, and Veterans Affairs
- Local Government II
- Education
- Environment and Natural Resources

== Electoral history ==
=== 2022 ===
North Carolina House of Representatives 43rd district Democratic primary election, 2022
Party	Candidate	Votes	%
Democratic	Elmer Floyd	3,581	59.93%
Democratic	Kimberly Hardy	2,150	35.98%
Democratic	Prince Christian	244	4.08%
Total votes		5,975	100%

=== 2020 ===
North Carolina House of Representatives 43rd district Democratic primary election, 2020
Party	Candidate	Votes	%
Democratic	Kimberly Hardy	4,887	54.11%
Democratic	Elmer Floyd (incumbent)	4,144	45.89%
Total votes		9,031	100%

=== 2018 ===
North Carolina House of Representatives 43rd district Democratic primary election, 2018
Party	Candidate	Votes	%
Democratic	Elmer Floyd (incumbent)	3,887	79.15%
Democratic	Theresa Gale	891	18.14%
Democratic	Prince Christian	133	2.71%
Total votes		4,911	100%

North Carolina House of Representatives 43rd district general election, 2018
Party	Candidate	Votes	%
Democratic	Elmer Floyd (incumbent)	16,175	74.13%
Republican	John Czajkowski	5,646	25.87%
Total votes		21,821	100%
Democratic hold			

=== 2016 ===
North Carolina House of Representatives 43rd district general election, 2016
Party	Candidate	Votes	%
Democratic	Elmer Floyd (incumbent)	27,121	100%
Total votes		27,121	100%
Democratic hold			

=== 2014 ===
North Carolina House of Representatives 43rd district general election, 2014
Party	Candidate	Votes	%
Democratic	Elmer Floyd (incumbent)	15,955	100%
Total votes		15,955	100%
Democratic hold			

=== 2012 ===
North Carolina House of Representatives 43rd district general election, 2012
Party	Candidate	Votes	%
Democratic	Elmer Floyd (incumbent)	23,832	69.58%
Republican	Diana Carroll	10,417	30.42%
Total votes		34,249	100%
Democratic hold			

=== 2010 ===
North Carolina House of Representatives 43rd district Democratic primary election, 2010
Party	Candidate	Votes	%
Democratic	Elmer Floyd (incumbent)	2,172	65.84%
Democratic	Mary McAllister	1,127	34.16%
Total votes		3,299	100%

North Carolina House of Representatives 43rd district general election, 2010
Party	Candidate	Votes	%
Democratic	Elmer Floyd (incumbent)	7,967	100%
Total votes		7,967	100%
Democratic hold			

=== 2008 ===
North Carolina House of Representatives 43rd district Democratic primary election, 2008
Party	Candidate	Votes	%
Democratic	Elmer Floyd	4,414	51.22%
Democratic	Mary McAllister (incumbent)	4,204	48.78%
Total votes		8,618	100%

North Carolina House of Representatives 43rd district general election, 2008
Party	Candidate	Votes	%
Democratic	Elmer Floyd	16,807	99.31%
Write-in		117	0.69%
Total votes		16,924	100%
Democratic hold			

=== 2006 ===
North Carolina House of Representatives 43rd district Democratic primary election, 2006
Party	Candidate	Votes	%
Democratic	Mary McAllister (incumbent)	1,679	59.73%
Democratic	Elmer Floyd	1,132	40.27%
Total votes		2,811	100%

=== 2004 ===
North Carolina House of Representatives 43rd district Democratic primary election, 2004
Party	Candidate	Votes	%
Democratic	Mary McAllister (incumbent)	1,875	57.67%
Democratic	Elmer Floyd	1,376	42.33%
Total votes		3,251	100%

=== 2002 ===
North Carolina House of Representatives 43rd district Democratic primary election, 2002
Party	Candidate	Votes	%
Democratic	Mary McAllister (incumbent)	2,744	60.56%
Democratic	Elmer Floyd	1,787	39.44%
Total votes		4,531	100%

North Carolina House of Representatives
Preceded by Mary McAllister	Member of the North Carolina House of Representatives from the 43rd district 2009-2021	Succeeded by Diane Wheatley
