= Jimmy L. Love Sr. =

American politician

Jimmy Love

Member of the North Carolina House of Representatives from the 51st district
- In office January 1, 2007 – January 1, 2011
- Preceded by: John Sauls
- Succeeded by: Mike Stone

Personal details
- Party: Democratic
- Education: University of North Carolina at Chapel Hill
- Profession: Attorney

Jimmy Lewis Love Sr. is a former Democratic member of the North Carolina House of Representatives, who represented the state's 51st district from 2007 till losing re-election in 2010.

== Electoral history ==
=== 2010 ===
North Carolina House of Representatives 51st district general election, 2010
Party	Candidate	Votes	%
Republican	Mike Stone	10,793	53.53%
Democratic	Jimmy Love (incumbent)	9,370	46.47%
Total votes		20,163	100%
Republican gain from Democratic			

=== 2008 ===
North Carolina House of Representatives 51st district general election, 2008
Party	Candidate	Votes	%
Democratic	Jimmy Love (incumbent)	19,231	59.18%
Republican	Linda Shook	13,264	40.82%
Total votes		32,495	100%
Democratic hold			

=== 2006 ===
North Carolina House of Representatives 51st district general election, 2006
Party	Candidate	Votes	%
Democratic	Jimmy Love	8,724	54.16%
Republican	Tim McNeill	7,383	45.84%
Total votes		16,107	100%
Democratic gain from Republican			

=== 2002 ===
North Carolina Senate 22nd district Democratic primary election, 2002
Party	Candidate	Votes	%
Democratic	Jimmy Love	6,690	62.17%
Democratic	Wanda H. Hunt	4,071	37.83%
Total votes		10,761	100%

North Carolina Senate 22nd district general election, 2002
Party	Candidate	Votes	%
Republican	Harris Blake	24,975	54.43%
Democratic	Jimmy Love	20,072	43.74%
Libertarian	Jonathan Lubecky	840	1.83%
Total votes		45,887	100%
Republican win (new seat)			

North Carolina House of Representatives
Preceded by John Sauls	Member of the North Carolina House of Representatives from the 51st district 2007-2011	Succeeded by Mike Stone
