= Diane Wheatley =

American politician

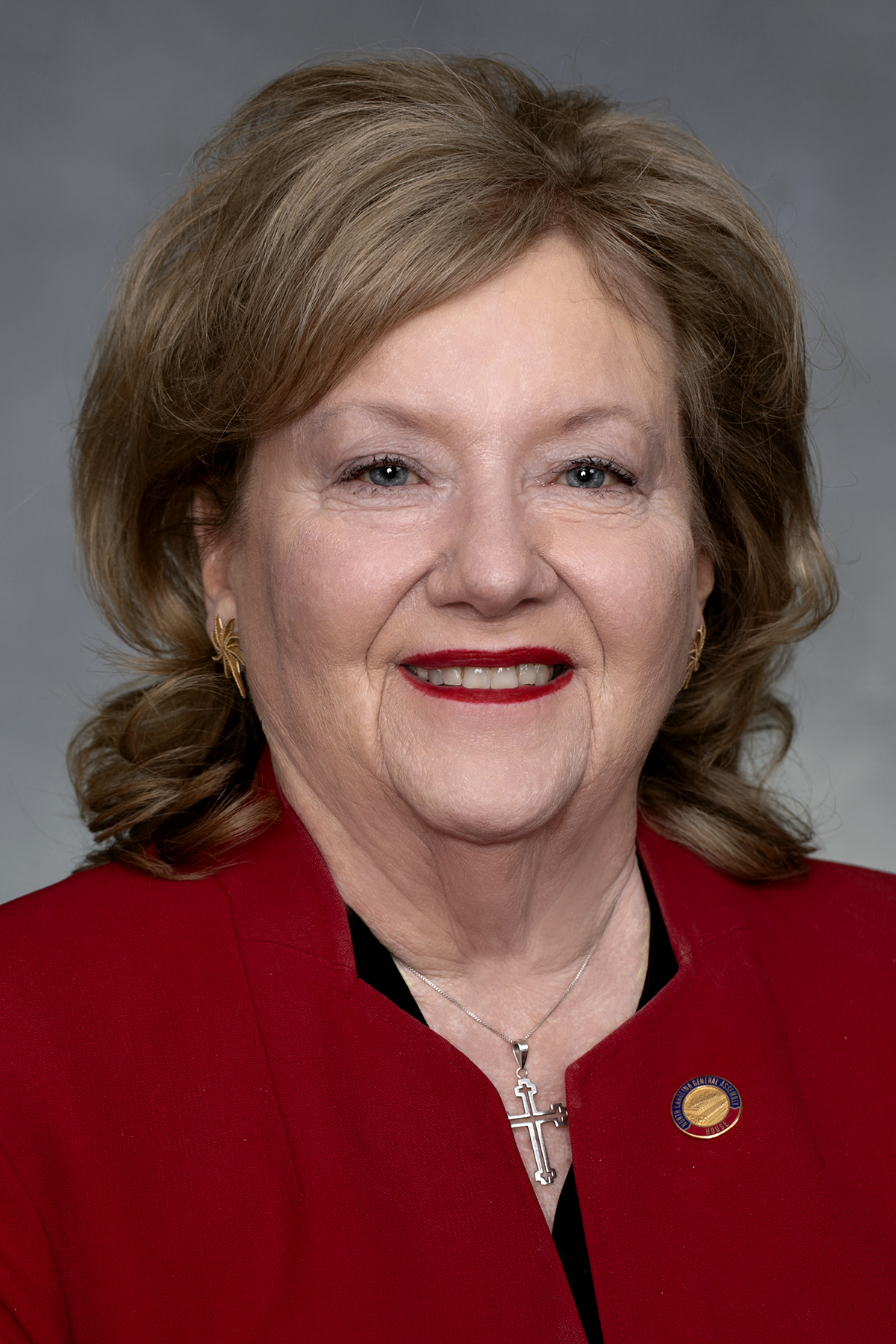

Member of the North Carolina House of Representatives from the 43rd district
- Incumbent
- Assumed office January 1, 2021
- Preceded by: Elmer Floyd

Personal details
- Born: April 12, 1951 (age 75) Fort Campbell, Kentucky, U.S.
- Party: Republican
- Spouse: Alfred Wheatley (m. 1973)
- Children: 3
- Education: Fayetteville Technical Community College (ASN)
- Website: Official website

Diane Wheatley is a Republican member of the North Carolina House of Representatives who has represented the 43rd district (including parts of Cumberland County) since 2021. Wheatley previously served on the Cumberland county school board from 1994 to 2004 and on the Cumberland county of commissioners from 2004 to 2008.

== Electoral history ==
=== 2022 ===
North Carolina House of Representatives 43rd district Republican primary election, 2022
Party	Candidate	Votes	%
Republican	Diane Wheatley (incumbent)	2,297	51.32%
Republican	Clarence W. Goins Jr.	2,179	48.68%
Total votes		4,476	100%

=== 2020 ===
North Carolina House of Representatives 43rd district Republican primary election, 2020
Party	Candidate	Votes	%
Republican	Diane Wheatley	3,257	55.47%
Republican	Clarence Wilson Goins Jr.	2,615	44.53%
Total votes		5,872	100%

North Carolina House of Representatives 43rd district general election, 2020
Party	Candidate	Votes	%
Republican	Diane Wheatley	20,408	51.80%
Democratic	Kimberly Hardy	18,988	48.20%
Total votes		39,396	100%
Republican gain from Democratic			

=== 2012 ===
North Carolina House of Representatives 45th district Republican primary election, 2012
Party	Candidate	Votes	%
Republican	John Szoka	3,093	57.72%
Republican	Diane Wheatley	2,266	42.28%
Total votes		5,359	100%

== Committee assignments ==
=== 2021-2022 session ===
- Appropriations Committee
- Appropriations - Education
- K-12 Education (Vice Chair)
- Education - Universities
- Environment
- State Government

North Carolina House of Representatives
Preceded by Elmer Floyd	Member of the North Carolina House of Representatives from the 43rd District; 2021–present	Incumbent
