= Mary Cordell Nesbitt =

American politician

Mary Cordell Nesbitt (December 18, 1911 – August 1, 1979) was an American politician.

Born in Asheville, North Carolina, Nesbitt went to Buncombe County Junior College. She then received her bachelor's and master's degrees from Western Carolina University and was an educational consultant. Nesbitt served in the North Carolina House of Representatives, as a Democrat, from 1975 until her death in 1979. Her son Martin Nesbitt was appointed to fill the seat.
