= Claude DeBruhl =

American politician

Member of the North Carolina House of Representatives from the 45th district
- In office 1969–1973

Member of the North Carolina House of Representatives from the 43rd district
- In office 1973–1979

Personal details
- Born: January 15, 1915 Madison County, North Carolina, U.S.
- Died: September 4, 1982 (aged 67) Lanham, Maryland, US
- Party: Democratic
- Education: Asheville-Biltmore College; Lenoir–Rhyne College

Claude DeBruhl (January 15, 1915 – September 4, 1982) was an American politician. He served five terms as a Democratic member of the North Carolina House of Representatives for both Buncombe County and Transylvania County. He was also an insurance broker, publisher, and real estate developer.

== Early life ==
DeBruhl was born in Madison County, North Carolina but spent most of his life in Buncombe County. His parents were Levasta Reece and William LeRoy DeBruhl.

He attended public schools in Buncombe County and graduated from Woodfin High School in Woodfin, North Carolina. He graduated from Asheville-Biltmore College in 1932. Lenoir–Rhyne College, and the Love Law School in Asheville, North Carolina. He also graduated from the Appraisal School at the University of Georgia.

== Career ==
DeBruhl served in the Navy Air Corps during World War II.

DeBruhl was a farmer and insurance broker and agent, owning Claude DeBruhl Agency, Inc. - Real Estate, Insurance, Bonds. He was a land developer, builder, and president of West Asheville Construction Company who built more than 500 homes. He was named Home Builder of the Year in Western North Carolina in 1967. He was president of the Western North Carolina Homebuilders Association from 1969 to 1970 and was a member of the Asheville Board of Realtors and the National Independent Fee Appraisers.

In 1969, DeBruhl was elected to represent the 45th district of the North Carolina House of Representatives, serving until 1973. The same year, he was elected to represent the 43rd district, and was reelected in 1975 and 1977. He served as a member and chair of the Military and Veterans Officers Committee of the House of Representatives. He was the chief sponsor of the bill that turned the former Asheville-Biltmore College into the University of North Carolina at Asheville, a branch on the University of North Carolina public university system. He also helped secure funding for the Western North Carolina Farmers Market and First Step Farm alcohol rehabililtation center. The latter led to a scandal when it was discovered that DeBruhl, who was president and chairman of the board of First Step, was renting land to the center for $600 a month ($2,898 in 2022 money); a local appraiser evaluated the property at $237 a month. The next year, DeBruhl was unsuccessful in his bit for reelection.

Following his career in the legislature, he began lobbying for bills that supported veterans as a commander with the North Carolina Veterans Council. In 1978, DeBruhl was appointed to the North Carolina Council for the Hearing Impaired. Governor Carl J. Stewart Jr. appointed him to the Legislative Study Commission on Alternatives for Water Management in 1979. In 1981, the General Assembly appointed DeBruhl to the Board of Trustees of the Teachers and State Employees Retirement System.

He was president of Allied Publishers, Inc. and was the founder and owner of Claude DeBruhl Agency and Allied Publishers. He was a member of the Asheville Chamber of Commerce.

== Honors ==
DeBruhl was admitted to the Order of the Long Leaf Pine in 1981.

In 2006, the North Carolina Board of Transportation dedicated the Claude DeBruhl Memorial Bridge at the intersection of Elk Mountain Road and U.S. 19/23 in Woodfin.

== Personal life ==
DeBruhl married Revonda Miller on April 13, 1940. They had two sons, Claude Michae DeBruhl and William Patrick DeBruhl. The family lived in Candler, North Carolina.

He was a member of the Disabled American Veterans, the West Asheville chapter of the American Legion, the Veteran of Foreign Wars, and was the national finance officer of the American Veterans of World War II, Korean, and Vietnam (AMVETS). He was an organizer of the Buncombe County Democratic Men's Club. He was a 32nd degree Mason and belonged to the Scottish Rite Temple, Oasis Shrine Temple, the West Asheville Rotary, the Loyal Order of Moose, and the Elks Club. He was president of the University of North Carolina at Asheville Alumni Association and a member of the Buncombe County Cattlemen's Association. He was member of Baptist church and Montmorenci Methodist Church.

On September 4, 1982, DeBruhl died at the age of 67 in Doctors Hospital in Lanham, Maryland. He was buried in the Oak Ridge Baptist Church cemetery in Jupiter, North Carolina.
