= Marie Colton =

American politician

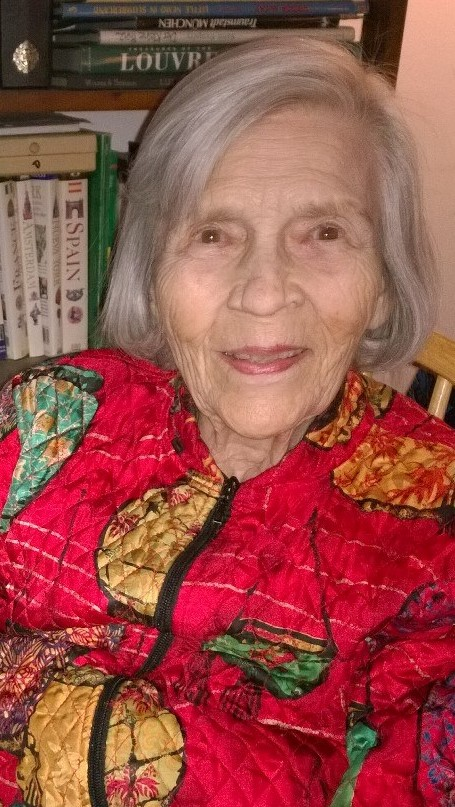
- Colton in 2014

Speaker pro tempore of the North Carolina House of Representatives
- In office January 30, 1991 – January 1, 1995
- Speaker: Dan Blue
- Preceded by: Don Beard
- Succeeded by: Carolyn Russell

Member of the North Carolina House of Representatives
- In office January 1, 1979 – January 1, 1995
- Preceded by: Claude DeBruhl
- Succeeded by: Wilma M. Sherrill
- Constituency: 43rd district (1979–1983); 51st district (1983–1985)

Personal details
- Born: Marie Jaquelin Watters; October 20, 1922 Charlotte, North Carolina, U.S.
- Died: September 25, 2018 (aged 95) Asheville, North Carolina, U.S.
- Party: Democratic
- Spouse: Henry E. Colton Jr. (m. 1943; died 2011)
- Education: Saint Mary's Junior College; University of North Carolina at Chapel Hill (BA)

Marie Jaquelin Watters Colton (October 20, 1922 – September 25, 2018) was an American politician who represented the 51st district in the North Carolina House of Representatives from 1978 to 1994.

== Biography ==
Colton was born in Charlotte, North Carolina and was educated at Saint Mary's Junior College in Raleigh. In 1943, she graduated from University of North Carolina at Chapel Hill with a degree in Romance languages. During World War II, Watters served a code-breaker for the United States Army Signal Corps at Arlington Hall. Marie Watters married Henry E. Colton. The couple first lived in Chapel Hill and later in Asheville. After her husband, an Asheville City Councilman, declined to run for state office, Marie Colton campaigned and won the seat. During her sixteen years of service, Colton focused on such issues as conservation and environmentalism, billboards, alternative medicine, tax reform, historic preservation, tourism and economic development in western North Carolina, child welfare protection, domestic violence laws, legislative ethics reform, and allowing local school boards to ban corporal punishment.

== Political career ==
Colton, a Democrat, was the first female Speaker Pro Tempore of the House, serving in that role from 1991 to 1994. In recognition of her advocacy of women and children's issues, Colton was appointed to the United Nations Commission on the Status of Women in 1994. In 1998, she was elected to the Common Cause National Governing Board. Colton was inducted into the North Carolina Women's Hall of Fame in 2009.

== Honours ==
- Keep America Beautiful National Award
- Lifetime Achievement Award from the Preservation Society of Asheville + Buncombe County in 2014
