= Narvel J. Crawford =

American politician (1929–2021)

Narvel Jim Crawford Jr.
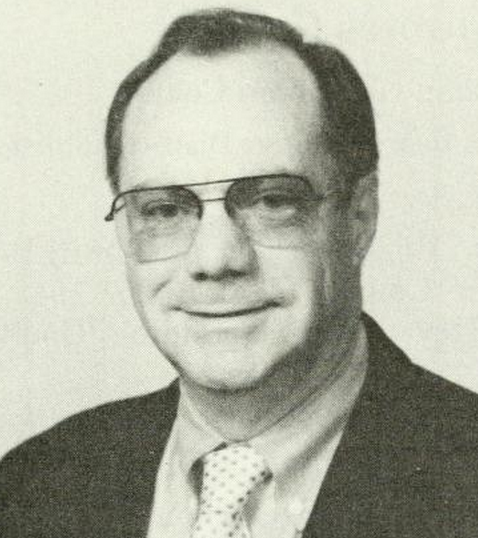

Member of the North Carolina Senate from the 51st district
- In office 1981–1995

Personal details
- Born: November 9, 1929 Asheville, North Carolina, U.S.
- Died: September 9, 2021 (aged 91) Asheville, North Carolina, U.S.
- Party: Democratic
- Education: Duke University, University of North Carolina at Chapel Hill
- Profession: property manager

Narvel James Crawford Jr. (November 9, 1929 – September 9, 2021) was an American politician who was a Democratic member of the North Carolina House of Representatives.

The son of Narvel James Sr. and Tymah (née Phillips) Crawford and a native of Asheville, Crawford was an alumnus of Duke University and the University of North Carolina at Chapel Hill. He served in the United States Army from 1954 to 1956 in the Counter Intelligence Corps.

Crawford was elected to the House in 1981 for the 51st district and served until 1995.

A property manager, Crawford also held positions as Director of the Asheville Chamber of Commerce, North Carolina Hemophilia Foundation, American Foundation for the Deaf, Epilepsy Association of North Carolina and American Lung Association of North Carolina. He was a member of an Episcopal church, and the fraternity Phi Beta Kappa.

Crawford died in Asheville, North Carolina on September 9, 2021, at the age 91.
