= Richard Braxton =

Richard Braxton may refer to:

- Richard Van Braxton, North Carolina politician
- Richard Braxton, character in The Accidental Husband
