= Jimmy Dixon (politician) =

American politician (born 1945)

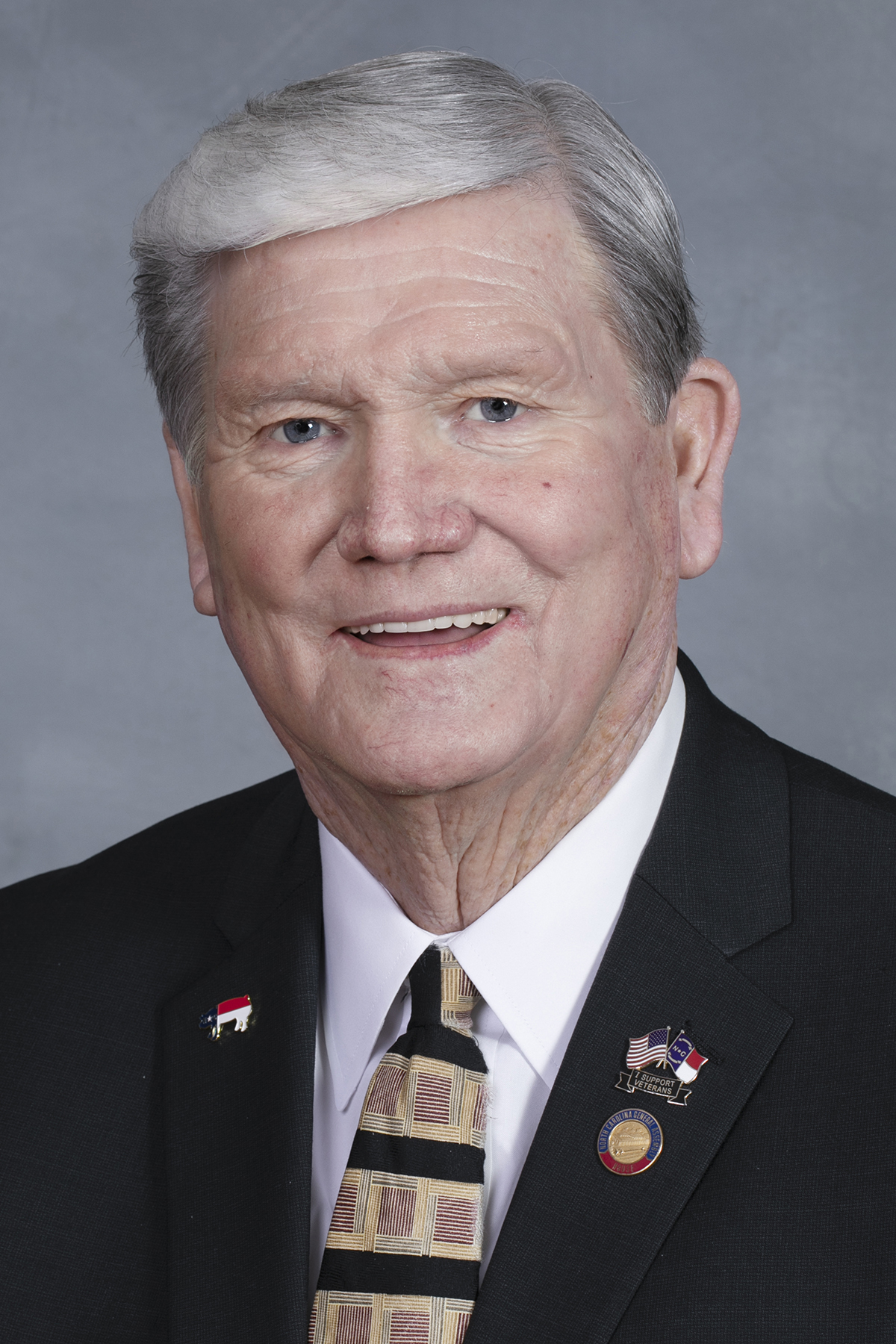

Member of the North Carolina House of Representatives from the 4th district
- Incumbent
- Assumed office January 1, 2011
- Preceded by: Russell Tucker

Personal details
- Born: James William Dixon; February 11, 1945 (age 81) Friendship, North Carolina, U.S.
- Party: Republican
- Education: Wake Forest University (BS)
- Occupation: Turkey farmer
- Website: www.jimmydixon.org

James William Dixon (born February 11, 1945) is a Republican member of the North Carolina House of Representatives. A farmer from Warsaw, North Carolina, Dixon has represented the 4th district (including constituents in Duplin and Wayne counties) since 2011.

== Early life and education ==
Dixon was born in Friendship, North Carolina. He graduated from James Kenan High School in Warsaw where he excelled in football. He attended Wake Forest University on a football scholarship and graduated in 1969 with a B.S. degree.

== Electoral history ==
Dixon did not hold any political office before winning election to the State House in 2010.

=== 2020 ===
North Carolina House of Representatives 4th district general election, 2020
| Party | Candidate | Votes | % |
|---|---|---|---|
| Republican | Jimmy Dixon (incumbent) | 21,282 | 65.72% |
| Democratic | Christopher Schulte | 11,099 | 34.28% |
| Total votes | | 32,381 | 100% |
| Republican hold | | | |

=== 2018 ===
North Carolina House of Representatives 4th district Republican primary election, 2018
| Party | Candidate | Votes | % |
|---|---|---|---|
| Republican | Jimmy Dixon (incumbent) | 2,765 | 83.64% |
| Republican | Nathan Ray Riggs | 541 | 16.36% |
| Total votes | | 3,306 | 100% |

North Carolina House of Representatives 4th district general election, 2018
| Party | Candidate | Votes | % |
|---|---|---|---|
| Republican | Jimmy Dixon (incumbent) | 13,546 | 62.87% |
| Democratic | Da'Quan Marcell Love | 7,515 | 34.88% |
| Constitution | Kevin E. Hayes | 486 | 2.26% |
| Total votes | | 21,547 | 100% |
| Republican hold | | | |

=== 2016 ===
North Carolina House of Representatives 4th district general election, 2016
| Party | Candidate | Votes | % |
|---|---|---|---|
| Republican | Jimmy Dixon (incumbent) | 24,646 | 100% |
| Total votes | | 24,646 | 100% |
| Republican hold | | | |

=== 2014 ===
North Carolina House of Representatives 4th district general election, 2014
| Party | Candidate | Votes | % |
|---|---|---|---|
| Republican | Jimmy Dixon (incumbent) | 15,933 | 100% |
| Total votes | | 15,933 | 100% |
| Republican hold | | | |

=== 2012 ===
Dixon and fellow incumbent Republican Efton Sager were both drawn into the same district after district lines were changed following census redistricting. Dixon defeated Sager, 62.30%–37.70%, in the Republican primary. Dixon went on to win re-election with 65% of the vote over Democratic challenger Rebecca H. Judge and Constitution Party nominee, who ran officially as a Libertarian, Kevin "Kenny" E. Hayes

North Carolina House of Representatives 4th district Republican primary election, 2012
| Party | Candidate | Votes | % |
|---|---|---|---|
| Republican | Jimmy Dixon (incumbent) | 4,873 | 62.30% |
| Republican | Efton Sager (incumbent) | 2,949 | 37.70% |
| Total votes | | 7,822 | 100% |

North Carolina House of Representatives 4th district general election, 2012
| Party | Candidate | Votes | % |
|---|---|---|---|
| Republican | Jimmy Dixon (incumbent) | 20,371 | 65.04% |
| Democratic | Rebecca H. Judge | 9,896 | 31.60% |
| Libertarian | Kevin E. Hayes | 1,053 | 3.36% |
| Total votes | | 31,320 | 100% |
| Republican hold | | | |

=== 2010 ===
Democratic incumbent Russell Tucker announced that he was retiring and would not seek re-election. Jimmy Dixon decided to run and was unopposed in the Republican primary. In the general election, he went on to face Democratic physician Mott Blair, who also was unopposed in his party primary.

Together, they spent over $250,000. Dixon defeated Blair by just 477 votes out of the 17,531 cast.

North Carolina House of Representatives 4th district general election, 2010
| Party | Candidate | Votes | % |
|---|---|---|---|
| Republican | Jimmy Dixon | 9,004 | 51.36% |
| Democratic | Mott Blair | 8,527 | 48.64% |
| Total votes | | 17,531 | 100% |
| Republican gain from Democratic | | | |

=== 2008 ===
In 2008 Dixon ran unsuccessfully as a Democrat for a seat on the Duplin County Board of Commissioners. He was defeated in a Democratic runoff by Frances Parks.

Duplin County Board of Commissioners 1st district Democratic primary election, 2008
| Party | Candidate | Votes | % |
|---|---|---|---|
| Democratic | Frances Parks | 775 | 39.80% |
| Democratic | Jimmy Dixon | 728 | 37.39% |
| Democratic | Snodie B. Wilson | 292 | 15.00% |
| Democratic | Winston Jennings | 152 | 7.81% |
| Total votes | | 1,947 | 100% |

== Committee assignments ==
=== 2021-2022 session ===
- Appropriations (Vice Chair)
- Appropriations - Agriculture and Natural and Economic Resources (Senior Chair)
- Agriculture (Senior Chair)
- Energy and Public Utilities
- Environment
- Health
- Redistricting
- Rules, Calendar, and Operations of the House

=== 2019-2020 session ===
- Appropriations (Vice Chair)
- Appropriations - Agriculture and Natural and Economic Resources (Senior Chair)
- Agriculture (Senior Chair)
- Energy and Public Utilities
- Environment
- Rules, Calendar, and Operations of the House

=== 2017-2018 session ===
- Appropriations (Vice Chair)
- Appropriations - Agriculture and Natural and Economic Resources (Chair)
- Agriculture (Chair)
- Environment
- Education - K-12
- Elections and Ethics Law
- Regulatory Reform

=== 2015-2016 session ===
- Appropriations (Vice Chair)
- Appropriations - Agriculture and Natural and Economic Resources (Chair)
- Agriculture (Chair)
- Environment
- Education - K-12
- Elections
- Regulatory Reform
- Insurance

=== 2013-2014 session ===
- Appropriations
- Agriculture (Chair)
- Environment
- Education
- Elections
- Regulatory Reform

=== 2011-2012 session ===
- Appropriations
- Agriculture (Vice Chair)
- Environment
- Education
- Elections
- Judiciary

North Carolina House of Representatives
| Preceded by Russell Tucker | Member of the North Carolina House of Representatives from the 4th district 2011–Present | Incumbent |
