= John R. Bell IV =

American politician (born 1979)

John Bell
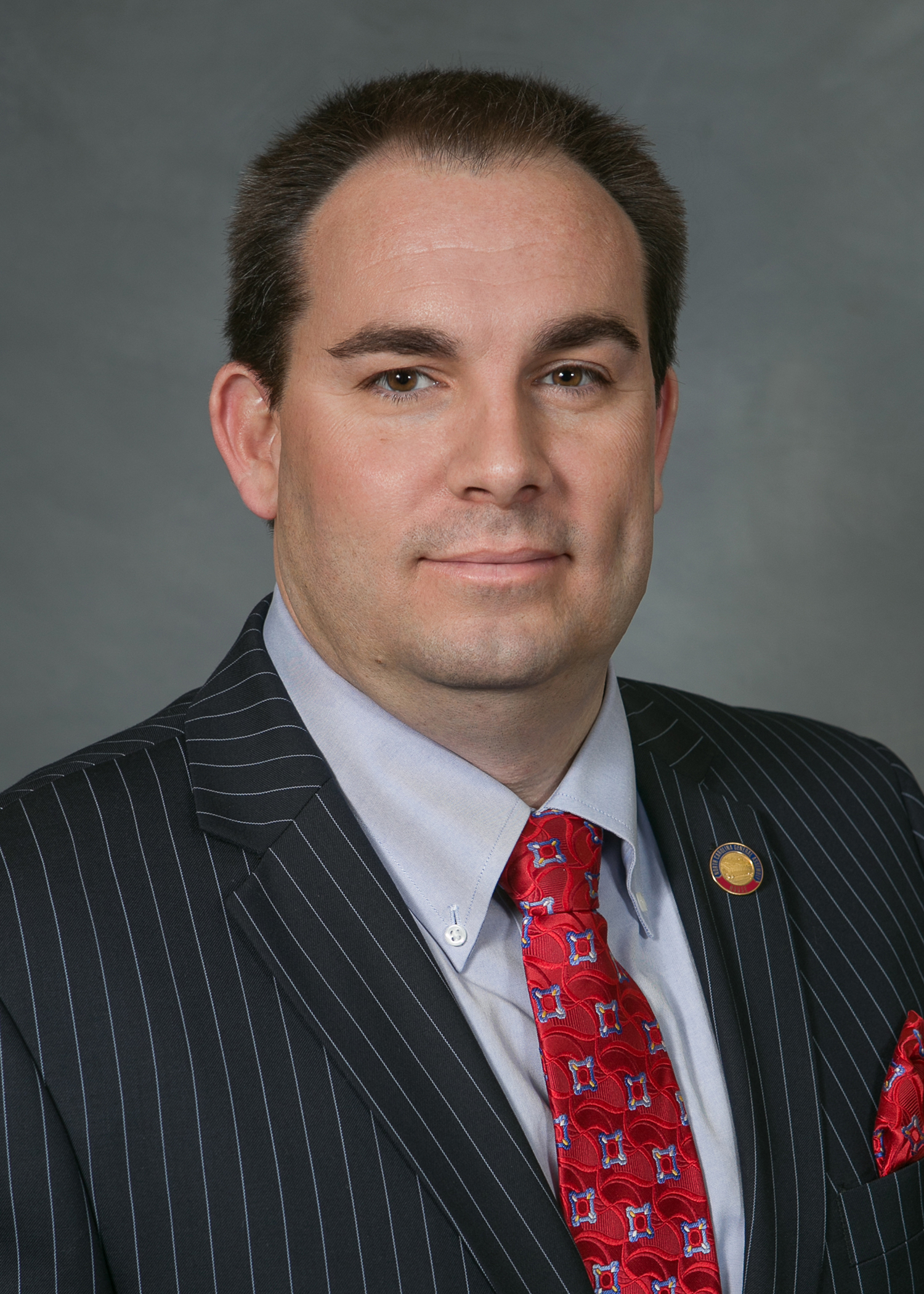

Majority Leader of the North Carolina House of Representatives
- In office August 30, 2016 – January 8, 2025
- Preceded by: Mike Hager
- Succeeded by: Brenden Jones

Member of the North Carolina House of Representatives from the 10th district
- Incumbent
- Assumed office January 1, 2013
- Preceded by: Karen Kozel

Personal details
- Born: John Richard Bell IV; May 18, 1979 (age 47) Mount Olive, North Carolina, U.S.
- Party: Republican
- Children: 1
- Education: University of North Carolina, Wilmington (BA)

John Richard Bell, IV, (born May 18, 1979) is an American politician. A member of the Republican Party, he has represented the 10th district (including Wayne, Greene, and Johnston counties) in the North Carolina House of Representatives since 2013.

== Early life and education ==
John Richard Bell, IV, is the child of John R. "Ricky" Bell, III, and Cindy Ezzell Bell. He has one sister. His father was a highway maintenance engineer for the North Carolina Department of Transportation. Bell graduated from the University of North Carolina Wilmington in 2001.

== Career ==
In 2016, Bell was a business development employee for North Carolina Community Federal Credit Union in Goldsboro, North Carolina. He later joined Sentinel Risk Advisors as a client executive.

In January 2016, Bell endorsed Senator Marco Rubio in the 2016 Republican Party presidential primaries.

Bell was elected by the state House Republican Caucus to the position of state House majority whip in 2014 and to the position of majority leader in 2016. Bell was also chairman of the House Regulatory Reform Committee and the House Select Committee on Wildlife Resources.

In the state House, Bell has been a supporter of restricting wind energy development, taking the position that wind farms are a threat to military bases in North Carolina because they could obstruct low-level military training flights. Bell sponsored legislation in 2013 to increase wind-energy regulation and in 2019 helped negotiate a bill to require the state to consult military commanders as part of the state permitting process for wind farms.

Bell and other General Assembly Republicans have opposed Democratic Governor Roy Cooper on the issue of expanding Medicaid. Cooper and other Democrats support the expansion of Medicaid, while Republicans oppose it.

Bell introduced legislation in 2019 to allow the sale of beer and wine at North Carolina public universities during athletic games. The bill passed later that year and seven University of North Carolina System institutions took advantage of the law by opting to allow alcohol sales on game days.

== Electoral history ==
=== 2024 ===
North Carolina House of Representatives 10th district general election, 2024
Party	Candidate	Votes	%
Republican	John Bell (incumbent)	24,475	60.79%
Democratic	Beatrice Jones	15,789	39.21%
Total votes		40,264	100%
Republican hold			

=== 2022 ===
North Carolina House of Representatives 10th district general election, 2022
Party	Candidate	Votes	%
Republican	John Bell (incumbent)	17,796	100%
Total votes		17,796	100%
Republican hold			

=== 2020 ===
North Carolina House of Representatives 10th district general election, 2020
Party	Candidate	Votes	%
Republican	John Bell (incumbent)	27,802	69.77%
Democratic	Carl Martin	12,047	30.23%
Total votes		39,849	100%
Republican hold			

=== 2018 ===
North Carolina House of Representatives 10th district general election, 2018
Party	Candidate	Votes	%
Republican	John Bell (incumbent)	18,838	69.34%
Democratic	Tracy Blackmon	8,329	30.66%
Total votes		27,167	100%
Republican hold			

=== 2016 ===
North Carolina House of Representatives 10th district general election, 2016
Party	Candidate	Votes	%
Republican	John Bell (incumbent)	26,440	71.55%
Democratic	Evelyn Paul	10,514	28.45%
Total votes		36,954	100%
Republican hold			

=== 2014 ===
North Carolina House of Representatives 10th district general election, 2014
Party	Candidate	Votes	%
Republican	John Bell (incumbent)	19,577	100%
Total votes		19,577	100%
Republican hold			

=== 2012 ===
North Carolina House of Representatives 10th district Republican primary election, 2012
Party	Candidate	Votes	%
Republican	John Bell	3,910	50.25%
Republican	Stephen LaRoque (incumbent)	3,871	49.75%
Total votes		7,781	100%

North Carolina House of Representatives 10th district general election, 2012
Party	Candidate	Votes	%
Republican	John Bell	24,475	66.61%
Democratic	Jim Babe Hardison	12,270	33.39%
Total votes		36,745	100%
Republican hold			

== Committee assignments ==
=== 2025–2026 session ===
- Appropriations
- Select Committee on Helene Recovery (Chair)
- Rules, Calendar, and Operations of the House

=== 2023–2024 session ===
- Agriculture
- Alcoholic Beverage Control
- Energy and Public Utilities
- Finance
- Health
- Rules, Calendar, and Operations of the House
- Disaster Recovery and Homeland Security

=== 2021–2022 session ===
- Agriculture
- Alcoholic Beverage Control
- Energy and Public Utilities
- Finance
- Rules, Calendar, and Operations of the House

=== 2019–2020 session ===
- Agriculture
- Alcoholic Beverage Control
- House Finance
- Energy and Public Utilities

=== 2017–2018 session ===
- Appropriations
- Agriculture
- Regulatory Reform
- Energy and Public Utilities
- Finance
- Rules, Calendar, and Operations of the House
- Banking
- Education - Universities
- Homeland Security, Military, and Veterans Affairs

=== 2015–2016 session ===
- Agriculture
- Regulatory Reform (chair)
- Finance
- Public Utilities
- Banking
- Commerce and Job Development
- Homeland Security, Military, and Veterans Affairs
- Judiciary III

=== 2013–2014 session ===
- Appropriations
- Agriculture (Vice Chair)
- Banking
- Government
- Homeland Security, Military, and Veterans Affairs
- Judiciary

North Carolina House of Representatives
Preceded by Mike Hager	Majority Leader of the North Carolina House of Representatives; 2016–2025	Succeeded by Brenden Jones
