= North Carolina's 4th House district =

American legislative district

North Carolina's 4th State House of Representatives district
Representative
Jimmy Dixon; R–Mount Olive
- Demographics: 47% White; 24% Black; 25% Hispanic; 1% Asian; 4% Multiracial
- Population (2024): 83,323

North Carolina's 4th House district is one of 120 districts in the North Carolina House of Representatives. It has been represented by Republican Jimmy Dixon since 2011.

== Geography ==
Since 2023, the district has included all of Duplin County, as well as part of Wayne County. The district overlaps with the 4th and 9th Senate districts.

== District officeholders ==
=== Multi-member district ===
Representative	Party	Dates	Notes	Representative	Party	Dates	Notes	Representative	Party	Dates	Notes	Counties
District created January 1, 1967.
William Mills (Maysville)	Democratic	January 1, 1967 – January 1, 1969		Hugh Ragsdale (Richlands)	Democratic	January 1, 1967 – January 1, 1971	Redistricted from the Onslow County district.	J. F. Mohn (Richlands)	Democratic	January 1, 1967 – January 1, 1975		1967–1973; All of Pender and Onslow counties.
Reuben Moore (Atkinson)	Democratic	January 1, 1969 – January 1, 1971		Hugh Ragsdale (Richlands)	Democratic	January 1, 1967 – January 1, 1971	Redistricted from the Onslow County district.	J. F. Mohn (Richlands)	Democratic	January 1, 1967 – January 1, 1975		1967–1973; All of Pender and Onslow counties.
Carl Venters (Jacksonville)	Democratic	January 1, 1971 – January 1, 1973		Richard James (Maple Hill)	Democratic	January 1, 1971 – January 1, 1975		J. F. Mohn (Richlands)	Democratic	January 1, 1967 – January 1, 1975		1967–1973; All of Pender and Onslow counties.
Ronald Earl Mason (Beaufort)	Democratic	January 1, 1973 – October 17, 1977	Redistricted from the 3rd district. Resigned.	Richard James (Maple Hill)	Democratic	January 1, 1971 – January 1, 1975		J. F. Mohn (Richlands)	Democratic	January 1, 1967 – January 1, 1975		1973–1993; All of Carteret and Onslow counties.
Ronald Earl Mason (Beaufort)	Democratic	January 1, 1973 – October 17, 1977	Redistricted from the 3rd district. Resigned.	Wilda Hurst (Hubert)	Democratic	January 1, 1975 – January 1, 1979		Hugh Sandlin (Jacksonville)	Democratic	January 1, 1975 – January 1, 1977		1973–1993; All of Carteret and Onslow counties.
Ronald Earl Mason (Beaufort)	Democratic	January 1, 1973 – October 17, 1977	Redistricted from the 3rd district. Resigned.	Wilda Hurst (Hubert)	Democratic	January 1, 1975 – January 1, 1979		G. Malcolm Fulcher Jr. (Atlantic Beach)	Democratic	January 1, 1977 – January 1, 1985		1973–1993; All of Carteret and Onslow counties.
Vacant		October 17, 1977 – June 12, 1978		Wilda Hurst (Hubert)	Democratic	January 1, 1975 – January 1, 1979		G. Malcolm Fulcher Jr. (Atlantic Beach)	Democratic	January 1, 1977 – January 1, 1985		1973–1993; All of Carteret and Onslow counties.
Bruce Ethridge (Beaufort)	Democratic	June 12, 1978 – January 1, 1993	Appointed to finish Mason's term.	Wilda Hurst (Hubert)	Democratic	January 1, 1975 – January 1, 1979		G. Malcolm Fulcher Jr. (Atlantic Beach)	Democratic	January 1, 1977 – January 1, 1985		1973–1993; All of Carteret and Onslow counties.
Bruce Ethridge (Beaufort)	Democratic	June 12, 1978 – January 1, 1993	Appointed to finish Mason's term.	Alexander Duke Guy (Jacksonville)	Democratic	January 1, 1979 – January 1, 1983	Retired to run for State Senate.	G. Malcolm Fulcher Jr. (Atlantic Beach)	Democratic	January 1, 1977 – January 1, 1985		1973–1993; All of Carteret and Onslow counties.
Bruce Ethridge (Beaufort)	Democratic	June 12, 1978 – January 1, 1993	Appointed to finish Mason's term.	J. Paul Tyndall (Jacksonville)	Democratic	January 1, 1983 – January 1, 1989		G. Malcolm Fulcher Jr. (Atlantic Beach)	Democratic	January 1, 1977 – January 1, 1985		1973–1993; All of Carteret and Onslow counties.
Bruce Ethridge (Beaufort)	Democratic	June 12, 1978 – January 1, 1993	Appointed to finish Mason's term.	J. Paul Tyndall (Jacksonville)	Democratic	January 1, 1983 – January 1, 1989		Gerald Hurst (Jacksonville)	Republican	January 1, 1985 – January 1, 1987		1973–1993; All of Carteret and Onslow counties.
Bruce Ethridge (Beaufort)	Democratic	June 12, 1978 – January 1, 1993	Appointed to finish Mason's term.	J. Paul Tyndall (Jacksonville)	Democratic	January 1, 1983 – January 1, 1989		Robert Grady (Jacksonville)	Republican	January 1, 1987 – January 1, 1993	Redistricted to the 80th district.	1973–1993; All of Carteret and Onslow counties.
Bruce Ethridge (Beaufort)	Democratic	June 12, 1978 – January 1, 1993	Appointed to finish Mason's term.	William Mills (Maysville)	Democratic	January 1, 1989 – January 1, 1991		Robert Grady (Jacksonville)	Republican	January 1, 1987 – January 1, 1993	Redistricted to the 80th district.	1973–1993; All of Carteret and Onslow counties.
Bruce Ethridge (Beaufort)	Democratic	June 12, 1978 – January 1, 1993	Appointed to finish Mason's term.	Ronald Smith (Atlantic Beach)	Democratic	January 1, 1991 – January 1, 1995	Lost re-election.	Robert Grady (Jacksonville)	Republican	January 1, 1987 – January 1, 1993	Redistricted to the 80th district.	1973–1993; All of Carteret and Onslow counties.
Jean Preston (Emerald Isle)	Republican	January 1, 1993 – January 1, 2003	Redistricted to the 13th district.	Ronald Smith (Atlantic Beach)	Democratic	January 1, 1991 – January 1, 1995	Lost re-election.					1993–2003; All of Carteret County. Part of Onslow County.
Jean Preston (Emerald Isle)	Republican	January 1, 1993 – January 1, 2003	Redistricted to the 13th district.	Macon St. Clair Snowden (Pine Knoll Shores)	Republican	January 1, 1995 – April 27, 1995	Died.					1993–2003; All of Carteret County. Part of Onslow County.
Jean Preston (Emerald Isle)	Republican	January 1, 1993 – January 1, 2003	Redistricted to the 13th district.	Vacant		April 27, 1995 – May 16, 1995						1993–2003; All of Carteret County. Part of Onslow County.
Jean Preston (Emerald Isle)	Republican	January 1, 1993 – January 1, 2003	Redistricted to the 13th district.	Jonathan Robinson (Atlantic)	Republican	May 16, 1995 – January 1, 1997	Appointed to finish Snowden's term. Lost re-election.					1993–2003; All of Carteret County. Part of Onslow County.
Jean Preston (Emerald Isle)	Republican	January 1, 1993 – January 1, 2003	Redistricted to the 13th district.	Ronald Smith (Atlantic Beach)	Democratic	January 1, 1997 – January 1, 2003	Redistricted to the 13th district and lost re-election.					1993–2003; All of Carteret County. Part of Onslow County.

=== Single-member district ===
Representative	Party	Dates	Notes	Counties
Charles Elliott Johnson (Greenville)	Democratic	January 1, 2003 – January 1, 2005	Redistricted to the 6th district and retired to run for State Senate.	2003–2005; Parts of Craven, Pitt, and Martin counties.
Russell Tucker (Pink Hill)	Democratic	January 1, 2005 – January 1, 2011	Retired.	2005–2013; All of Duplin County. Part of Onslow County.
Jimmy Dixon (Mount Olive)	Republican	January 1, 2011 – Present		2005–2013; All of Duplin County. Part of Onslow County.
Jimmy Dixon (Mount Olive)	Republican	January 1, 2011 – Present		2013–2019; Parts of Duplin and Wayne counties.
Jimmy Dixon (Mount Olive)	Republican	January 1, 2011 – Present		2019–2023; All of Duplin County. Part of Onslow County.
Jimmy Dixon (Mount Olive)	Republican	January 1, 2011 – Present		2023–Present; All of Duplin County. Part of Wayne County.

== Election results ==
=== 2026 ===
North Carolina House of Representatives 4th district Republican primary election, 2026
Party	Candidate	Votes	%
Republican	Jimmy Dixon (incumbent)	5,489	81.67%
Republican	Marcella Barbour	1,232	18.33%
Total votes		6,721	100%

North Carolina House of Representatives 4th district general election, 2026
Party	Candidate	Votes	%
Republican	Jimmy Dixon (incumbent)		
Democratic	Vernon Moore		
Total votes			100%

=== 2024 ===
North Carolina House of Representatives 4th district general election, 2024
Party	Candidate	Votes	%
Republican	Jimmy Dixon (incumbent)	22,093	63.03%
Democratic	Vernon Moore	12,961	36.97%
Total votes		35,054	100%
Republican hold			

=== 2022 ===
North Carolina House of Representatives 4th district general election, 2022
Party	Candidate	Votes	%
Republican	Jimmy Dixon (incumbent)	16,449	66.58%
Democratic	Wesley L. Boykin	8,256	33.42%
Total votes		24,705	100%
Republican hold			

=== 2020 ===
North Carolina House of Representatives 4th district general election, 2020
Party	Candidate	Votes	%
Republican	Jimmy Dixon (incumbent)	21,282	65.72%
Democratic	Christopher Schulte	11,099	34.28%
Total votes		32,381	100%
Republican hold			

=== 2018 ===
North Carolina House of Representatives 4th district Republican primary election, 2018
Party	Candidate	Votes	%
Republican	Jimmy Dixon (incumbent)	2,765	83.64%
Republican	Nathan Ray Riggs	541	16.36%
Total votes		3,306	100%

North Carolina House of Representatives 4th district general election, 2018
Party	Candidate	Votes	%
Republican	Jimmy Dixon (incumbent)	13,546	62.87%
Democratic	Da'Quan Marcell Love	7,515	34.88%
Constitution	Kevin E. Hayes	486	2.26%
Total votes		21,547	100%
Republican hold			

=== 2016 ===
North Carolina House of Representatives 4th district general election, 2016
Party	Candidate	Votes	%
Republican	Jimmy Dixon (incumbent)	24,646	100%
Total votes		24,646	100%
Republican hold			

=== 2014 ===
North Carolina House of Representatives 4th district general election, 2014
Party	Candidate	Votes	%
Republican	Jimmy Dixon (incumbent)	15,933	100%
Total votes		15,933	100%
Republican hold			

=== 2012 ===
North Carolina House of Representatives 4th district Republican primary election, 2012
Party	Candidate	Votes	%
Republican	Jimmy Dixon (incumbent)	4,873	62.30%
Republican	Efton Sager (incumbent)	2,949	37.70%
Total votes		7,822	100%

North Carolina House of Representatives 4th district general election, 2012
Party	Candidate	Votes	%
Republican	Jimmy Dixon (incumbent)	20,371	65.04%
Democratic	Rebecca H. Judge	9,896	31.60%
Libertarian	Kevin E. Hayes	1,053	3.36%
Total votes		31,320	100%
Republican hold			

=== 2010 ===
North Carolina House of Representatives 4th district general election, 2010
Party	Candidate	Votes	%
Republican	Jimmy Dixon	9,004	51.36%
Democratic	Mott Blair	8,527	48.64%
Total votes		17,531	100%
Republican gain from Democratic			

=== 2008 ===
North Carolina House of Representatives 4th district general election, 2008
Party	Candidate	Votes	%
Democratic	Russell Tucker (incumbent)	19,024	100%
Total votes		19,024	100%
Democratic hold			

=== 2006 ===
North Carolina House of Representatives 4th district Democratic primary election, 2006
Party	Candidate	Votes	%
Democratic	Russell Tucker (incumbent)	2,516	84.77%
Democratic	Martin L. Herring	452	15.23%
Total votes		2,968	100%

North Carolina House of Representatives 4th district general election, 2006
Party	Candidate	Votes	%
Democratic	Russell Tucker (incumbent)	6,844	63.20%
Republican	Richard J. Kaiser	3,985	36.80%
Total votes		10,829	100%
Democratic hold			

=== 2004 ===
North Carolina House of Representatives 4th district Democratic primary election, 2004
Party	Candidate	Votes	%
Democratic	Russell Tucker	3,500	73.28%
Democratic	Naverro Brown	788	16.50%
Democratic	Martin L. Herring	488	10.22%
Total votes		4,776	100%

North Carolina House of Representatives 4th district general election, 2004
Party	Candidate	Votes	%
Democratic	Russell Tucker	15,333	100%
Total votes		15,333	100%
Democratic win (new seat)			

=== 2002 ===
North Carolina House of Representatives 4th district general election, 2002
Party	Candidate	Votes	%
Democratic	Charles Elliott Johnson	9,109	51.77%
Republican	John Wobbleton	8,487	48.23%
Total votes		17,596	100%
Democratic hold			

=== 2000 ===
North Carolina House of Representatives 4th district general election, 2000
Party	Candidate	Votes	%
Republican	Jean Preston (incumbent)	22,752	39.75%
Democratic	Ronald Smith (incumbent)	19,844	34.67%
Republican	Jonathan Robinson	14,648	25.59%
Total votes		57,244	100%
Republican hold			
Democratic hold			
