= North Carolina's 10th House district =

American legislative district

North Carolina's 10th State House of Representatives district
Representative
John Bell; R–Goldsboro
- Demographics: 54% White; 31% Black; 8% Hispanic; 1% Asian; 5% Multiracial
- Population (2024): 84,664

North Carolina's 10th House district is one of 120 districts in the North Carolina House of Representatives. It has been represented by Republican John Bell since 2013.

== Geography ==
Since 2023, the district has included parts of Wayne County. The district overlaps with the 4th Senate district.

== District officeholders ==
=== Multi-member district ===
Representative	Party	Dates	Notes	Representative	Party	Dates	Notes	Counties
District created January 1, 1967.
Nancy Chase (Eureka)	Democratic	January 1, 1967 – January 1, 1973	Redistricted from the Wayne County district. Redistricted to the 9th district.	Thomas Edward Strickland (Goldsboro)	Democratic	January 1, 1967 – January 1, 1971	Retired to run for State Senate.	1967–1973; All of Wayne County.
Nancy Chase (Eureka)	Democratic	January 1, 1967 – January 1, 1973	Redistricted from the Wayne County district. Redistricted to the 9th district.	W. P. "Bill" Kemp Jr. (Goldsboro)	Democratic	January 1, 1971 – January 1, 1973	Redistricted to the 9th district.	1967–1973; All of Wayne County.

=== Single-member district ===
Representative	Party	Dates	Notes	Counties
T. J. Baker (Wallace)	Democratic	January 1, 1973 – January 1, 1979	Redistricted from the 11th district.	1973–1983; All of Duplin County.
Douglas Clark (Kenansville)	Democratic	January 1, 1979 – January 1, 1983		1973–1983; All of Duplin County.
Wendell Murphy (Rose Hill)	Democratic	January 1, 1983 – January 1, 1989	Retired to run for State Senate.	1983–1993; All of Duplin and Jones counties.
Charles Albertson (Beulaville)	Democratic	January 1, 1989 – January 1, 1993	Retired to run for State Senate.	1983–1993; All of Duplin and Jones counties.
Vance Alphin (Mount Olive)	Democratic	January 1, 1993 – January 1, 1995		1993–2003; Parts of Duplin, Jones, and Onslow counties.
Cynthia Watson (Rose Hill)	Republican	January 1, 1995 – January 1, 1999	Retired.	1993–2003; Parts of Duplin, Jones, and Onslow counties.
Russell Tucker (Pink Hill)	Democratic	January 1, 1999 – January 1, 2003	Lost re-election.	1993–2003; Parts of Duplin, Jones, and Onslow counties.
Stephen LaRoque (Kinston)	Republican	January 1, 2003 – January 1, 2007	Lost re-nomination.	2003–2005; Parts of Duplin and Lenoir counties.
Stephen LaRoque (Kinston)	Republican	January 1, 2003 – January 1, 2007	Lost re-nomination.	2005–2013; All of Greene County. Parts of Lenoir and Wayne counties.
Van Braxton (Kinston)	Democratic	January 1, 2007 – January 1, 2011	Lost re-election.	2005–2013; All of Greene County. Parts of Lenoir and Wayne counties.
Stephen LaRoque (Kinston)	Republican	January 1, 2011 – August 1, 2012	Lost re-nomination and resigned.	2005–2013; All of Greene County. Parts of Lenoir and Wayne counties.
Vacant		August 1, 2012 – August 29, 2012		2005–2013; All of Greene County. Parts of Lenoir and Wayne counties.
Karen Kozel (La Grange)	Republican	August 29, 2012 – January 1, 2013	Appointed to finish LaRoque's term. Retired.	2005–2013; All of Greene County. Parts of Lenoir and Wayne counties.
John Bell (Goldsboro)	Republican	January 1, 2013 – Present		2013–2019; Parts of Greene, Wayne, Lenoir, and Craven counties.
John Bell (Goldsboro)	Republican	January 1, 2013 – Present		2019–2023; All of Greene County. Parts of Wayne and Johnston counties.
John Bell (Goldsboro)	Republican	January 1, 2013 – Present		2023–Present; Part of Wayne County.

== Election results ==
=== 2024 ===
North Carolina House of Representatives 10th district general election, 2024
Party	Candidate	Votes	%
Republican	John Bell (incumbent)	24,475	60.79%
Democratic	Beatrice Jones	15,789	39.21%
Total votes		40,264	100%
Republican hold			

=== 2022 ===
North Carolina House of Representatives 10th district general election, 2022
Party	Candidate	Votes	%
Republican	John Bell (incumbent)	17,796	100%
Total votes		17,796	100%
Republican hold			

=== 2020 ===
North Carolina House of Representatives 10th district general election, 2020
Party	Candidate	Votes	%
Republican	John Bell (incumbent)	27,802	69.77%
Democratic	Carl Martin	12,047	30.23%
Total votes		39,849	100%
Republican hold			

=== 2018 ===
North Carolina House of Representatives 10th district general election, 2018
Party	Candidate	Votes	%
Republican	John Bell (incumbent)	18,838	69.34%
Democratic	Tracy Blackmon	8,329	30.66%
Total votes		27,167	100%
Republican hold			

=== 2016 ===
North Carolina House of Representatives 10th district general election, 2016
Party	Candidate	Votes	%
Republican	John Bell (incumbent)	26,440	71.55%
Democratic	Evelyn Paul	10,514	28.45%
Total votes		36,954	100%
Republican hold			

=== 2014 ===
North Carolina House of Representatives 10th district general election, 2014
Party	Candidate	Votes	%
Republican	John Bell (incumbent)	19,577	100%
Total votes		19,577	100%
Republican hold			

=== 2012 ===
North Carolina House of Representatives 10th district Republican primary election, 2012
Party	Candidate	Votes	%
Republican	John Bell	3,910	50.25%
Republican	Stephen LaRoque (incumbent)	3,871	49.75%
Total votes		7,781	100%

North Carolina House of Representatives 10th district general election, 2012
Party	Candidate	Votes	%
Republican	John Bell	24,475	66.61%
Democratic	Jim Babe Hardison	12,270	33.39%
Total votes		36,745	100%
Republican hold			

=== 2010 ===
North Carolina House of Representatives 10th district general election, 2010
Party	Candidate	Votes	%
Republican	Stephen LaRoque	11,802	57.23%
Democratic	Van Braxton (incumbent)	8,820	42.77%
Total votes		20,622	100%
Republican gain from Democratic			

=== 2008 ===
North Carolina House of Representatives 10th district general election, 2008
Party	Candidate	Votes	%
Democratic	Van Braxton (incumbent)	15,506	51.56%
Republican	Stephen LaRoque	14,565	48.44%
Total votes		30,071	100%
Democratic hold			

=== 2006 ===
North Carolina House of Representatives 10th district Republican primary election, 2006
Party	Candidate	Votes	%
Republican	Willie Ray Starling	913	50.30%
Republican	Stephen LaRoque (incumbent)	902	49.70%
Total votes		1,815	100%

North Carolina House of Representatives 10th district general election, 2006
Party	Candidate	Votes	%
Democratic	Van Braxton	7,699	55.01%
Republican	Willie Ray Starling	6,296	44.99%
Total votes		13,995	100%
Democratic gain from Republican			

=== 2004 ===
North Carolina House of Representatives 10th district Republican primary election, 2004
Party	Candidate	Votes	%
Republican	Stephen LaRoque (incumbent)	1,169	56.45%
Republican	Willie Ray Starling	902	43.55%
Total votes		2,071	100%

North Carolina House of Representatives 10th district general election, 2004
Party	Candidate	Votes	%
Republican	Stephen LaRoque (incumbent)	14,529	57.38%
Democratic	James D. "Lew" Llewellyn	10,793	42.62%
Total votes		25,322	100%
Republican hold			

=== 2002 ===
North Carolina House of Representatives 10th district Democratic primary election, 2002
Party	Candidate	Votes	%
Democratic	Russell Tucker (incumbent)	5,441	69.95%
Democratic	James L. "Jim" Hardison	1,492	19.18%
Democratic	Martin L. Herring	845	10.86%
Total votes		7,778	100%

North Carolina House of Representatives 10th district Republican primary election, 2002
Party	Candidate	Votes	%
Republican	Stephen LaRoque	1,497	68.23%
Republican	Rich "Dickey" Jarman	697	31.77%
Total votes		2,194	100%

North Carolina House of Representatives 10th district general election, 2002
Party	Candidate	Votes	%
Republican	Stephen LaRoque	9,109	50.93%
Democratic	Russell Tucker (incumbent)	8,777	49.07%
Total votes		17,886	100%
Republican gain from Democratic			

=== 2000 ===
North Carolina House of Representatives 10th district Democratic primary election, 2000
Party	Candidate	Votes	%
Democratic	Russell Tucker (incumbent)	3,297	54.77%
Democratic	Sherwood Fountain	1,170	19.44%
Democratic	Martin L. Herring	1,114	18.51%
Democratic	Derl Walker	439	7.29%
Total votes		6,020	100%

North Carolina House of Representatives 10th district general election, 2000
Party	Candidate	Votes	%
Democratic	Russell Tucker (incumbent)	8,077	52.01%
Republican	Sherwood Fountain	7,454	47.99%
Total votes		15,531	100%
Democratic hold			
