= Russell E. Tucker =

American politician from North Carolina

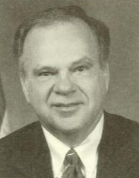
- Tucker's official 1999 portrait

Member of the North Carolina House of Representatives
- In office January 1, 2005 – January 1, 2011
- Preceded by: Constituency Established
- Succeeded by: Jimmy Dixon
- Constituency: 4th District
- In office January 1, 1999 – January 1, 2003
- Preceded by: Cynthia Bailey Watson
- Succeeded by: Stephen LaRoque
- Constituency: 10th District

Personal details
- Born: December 7, 1943 (age 82) Magnolia, North Carolina, U.S.
- Party: Democratic

Russell E. Tucker is a Democratic member of the North Carolina General Assembly, representing the state's fourth House district from 1999 to 2003 and again from 2005 until retiring in 2011.

North Carolina House of Representatives
| Preceded by Cynthia Bailey Watson | Member of the North Carolina House of Representatives from the 10th district 1999–2003 | Succeeded by Stephen LaRoque |
| Preceded by Charles Elliott Johnson | Member of the North Carolina House of Representatives from the 4th district 2005–2011 | Succeeded by Jimmy Dixon |
