= Charles Elliott Johnson =

American politician

Member of the North Carolina House of Representatives from the 4th district
- In office January 1, 2003 – January 1, 2005
- Preceded by: Gene Rogers (Redistricting)
- Succeeded by: Arthur Williams (Redistricting)

Personal details
- Party: Democratic

Charles Elliott Johnson is a former Democratic member of the North Carolina General Assembly who represented the state's fourth House district, including constituents in Craven, Martin and Pitt counties. A retiree from Greenville, North Carolina, Johnson served in the state House during the 2003–2004 session, but was defeated in a 2004 run for the state Senate.

== Notes ==
North Carolina House of Representatives
Preceded by Ronald Smith; Jean Preston	Member of the North Carolina House of Representatives from the 4th district 2003-2005	Succeeded by Russell Tucker
