= Stephen A. LaRoque =

American politician from North Carolina

Representative Stephen LaRoque

Member of the North Carolina House of Representatives from the 10th district
- In office January 1, 2011 – August 1, 2012
- Preceded by: Van Braxton
- Succeeded by: Karen Kozel
- In office January 1, 2003 – January 1, 2007
- Preceded by: Russell Tucker
- Succeeded by: Van Braxton

Personal details
- Party: Republican

Stephen Alexander LaRoque was a Republican member of the North Carolina General Assembly. He represented the state's 10th House district, including constituents in Greene, Lenoir and Wayne counties. A business owner from Kinston, North Carolina, LaRoque served three terms.

LaRoque was defeated in the May 2012 Republican primary by John Bell.

LaRoque was supposed to have redirected loans from the U.S Department of Agriculture to small business owners in rural areas with limited access to capital. He was indicted by a federal grand jury "on charges that he misappropriated money from a federal program..." LaRoque resigned from the legislature in July 2012. LaRoque used the money on salaries, new cars and bejeweled Faberge eggs. He was convicted on 12 counts including theft, money laundering and filing false tax returns though ten charges were later dismissed.(2013)

On August 1, 2013, he was indicted on 12 counts. All but two of the twelve counts were set aside by U.S. Senior District Court Judge Malcolm Howard, due to juror misconduct, and a new trial was ordered. LaRoque pled guilty to aiding and abetting theft.

He was released in May 2017 after serving one year and nine months.

North Carolina House of Representatives
Preceded by Russell Tucker	Member of the North Carolina House of Representatives from the 10th district 2003–2007	Succeeded by Van Braxton
Preceded by Van Braxton	Member of the North Carolina House of Representatives from the 10th district 2011–2012	Succeeded by Karen Kozel
