= Van Braxton =

American politician from North Carolina

Member of the North Carolina House of Representatives from the 10th district
- In office January 1, 2007 – January 1, 2011
- Preceded by: Stephen LaRoque
- Succeeded by: Stephen LaRoque

Personal details
- Party: Democratic
- Spouse: Sandra
- Education: East Carolina University
- Profession: Insurance

Richard Vance "Van" Braxton was a member of the North Carolina General Assembly from North Carolina's 10th House District, first elected in 2006. He served as a Kinston City Councilman for eleven years, being first elected in 1994. He owned and operated Goodyear Tire of Kinston for over twenty-five years, and manages a farm in Greene County. Braxton also is a member of Queen Street Methodist Church, where he has served as chair of the administrative board and chair of the finance committee.

Van Braxton is a member of PRIDE of Kinston, which works to revitalize Kinston's downtown. He also serves on the Lenoir County Recreation Board and the Gang Violence Taskforce, and volunteers for the Red Cross.

His wife, Sandra, is a retired guidance counselor at Kinston High School.

== Previous sessions ==
For the 2009–2011 sessions, Braxton was Chair of the House Local Government II Committee. He was also Vice-Chair of the Agriculture Committee and Insurance Committee. Braxton served on the following committees:

- Finance
- Homeland Security, Military, and Veterans Affairs
- Mental Health Reform
- Commerce, Small Business, and Entrepreneurship

During the interim, Braxton served on five committees: Finance, State Health Plan, JOBS, Small Business, and Mental Health Oversight.

North Carolina House of Representatives
Preceded by Stephen LaRoque	Member of the North Carolina House of Representatives from the 10th district 2007–2011	Succeeded by Stephen LaRoque
