= 2026 North Carolina House of Representatives election =

- November 3, 2026

All 120 seats in the North Carolina House of Representatives 61 seats needed for a majority
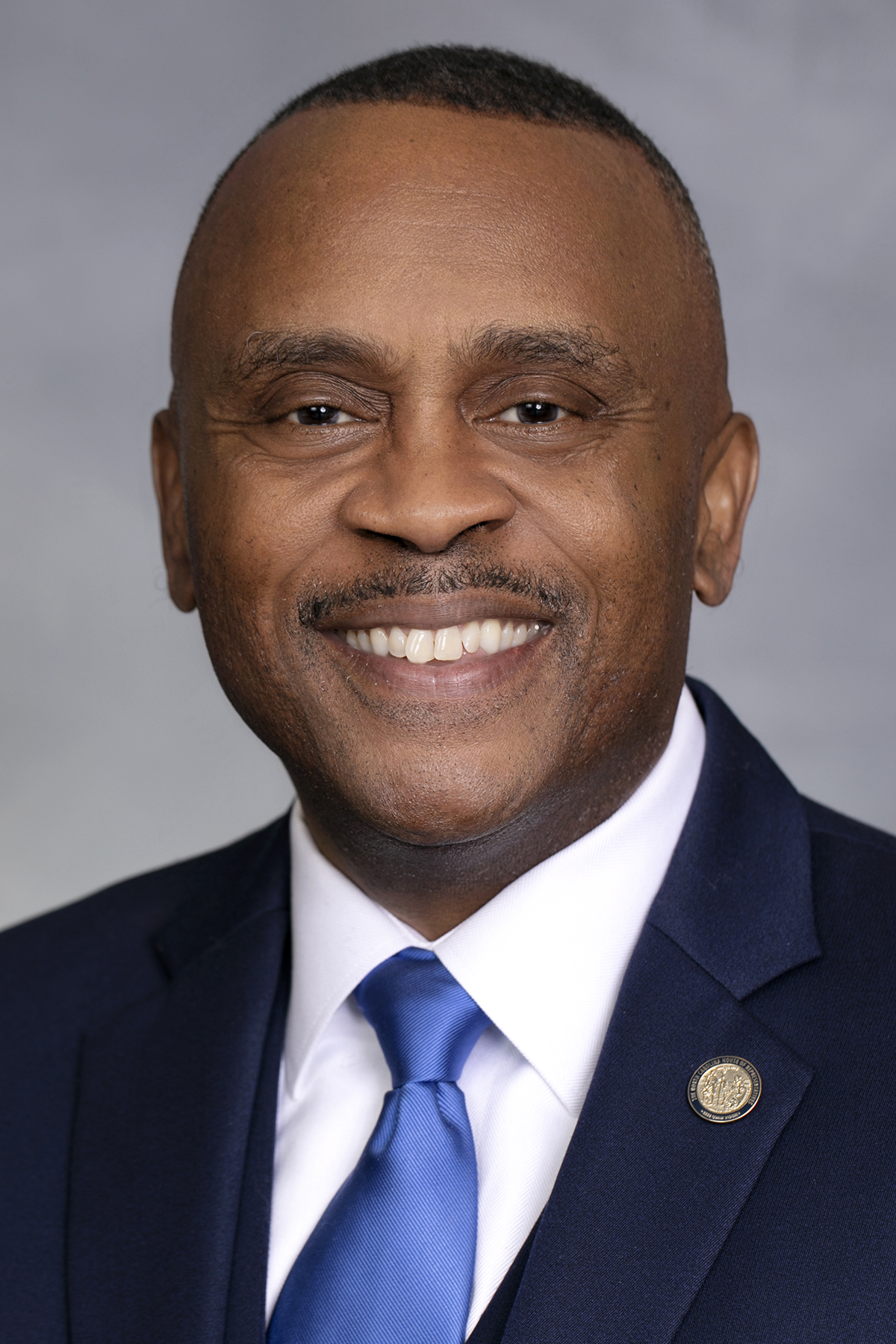

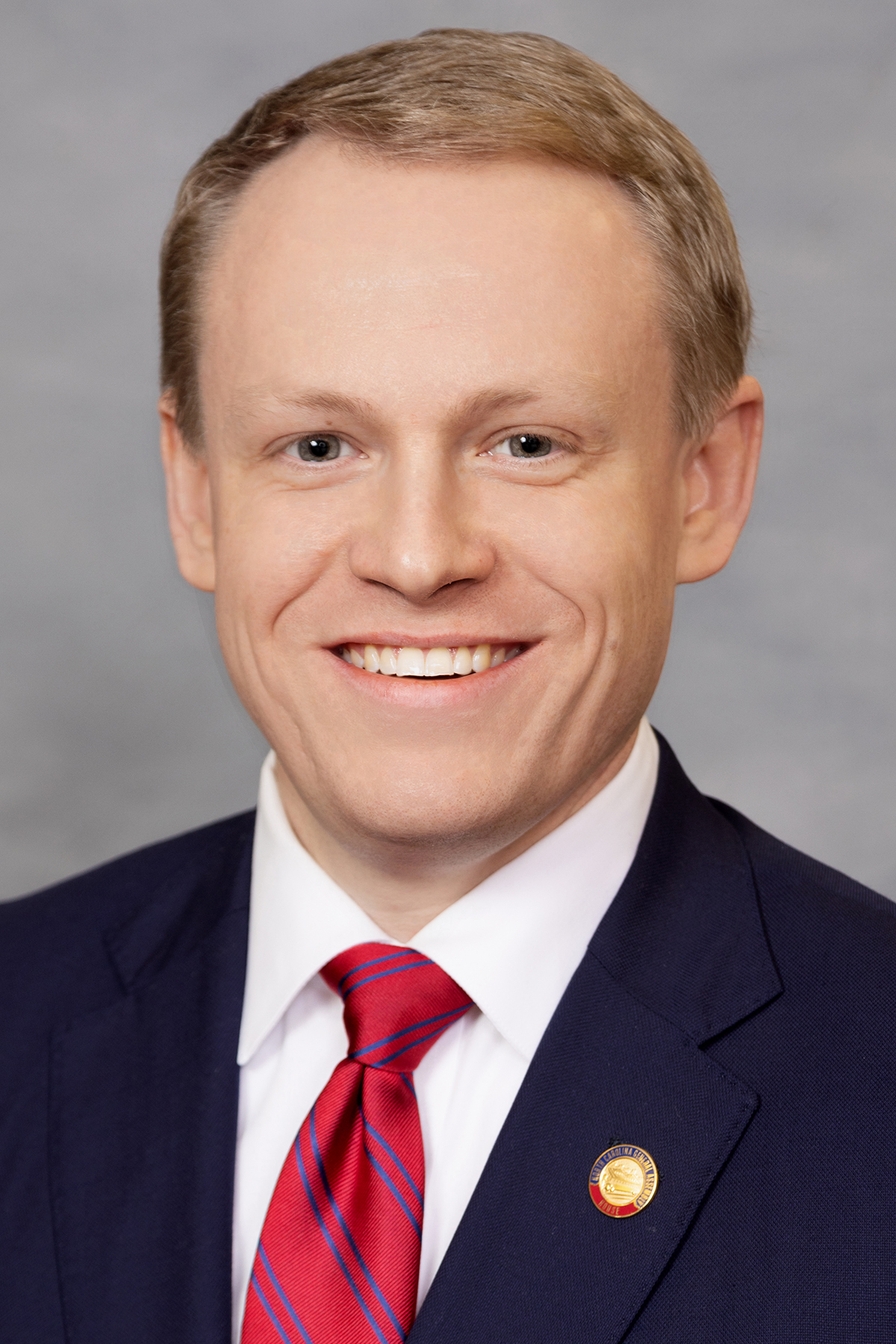

	Majority party	Minority party	Third party
Leader	Robert Reives	Destin Hall
Party	Democratic	Republican	Independent
Leader since	January 1, 2021	January 8, 2025
Leader's seat	54th - Goldston	87th - Granite Falls
Last election	49 seats, 51.20%	71 seats, 47.51%	0 seats, N/A
Seats before	47 (Note: Both independent state representatives (Carla Cunningham of the 106th district and Nasif Majeed of the 99th district) caucused with the Democrats.)	71	2
Seats after	71	48	1 (Note: State representative-elect April Montgomery of the 51st district has not announced if she will caucus with a party.)
Seat change	▲24	▼23	▼1
- Democratic gain Democratic hold Republican hold Independent gain
Speaker before election
Destin Hall
Republican
Elected Speaker
TBD
Democratic

The 2026 North Carolina House of Representatives election was held on November 3, 2026, to elect all 120 members to North Carolina's House of Representatives. Representatives will serve two-year terms. The election coincided with elections for other offices, including for the U.S Senate, U.S. House of Representatives, and State Senate. Primary elections were held on March 3.

In 2024, Democrats broke the Republican's veto-proof super majority in newly drawn districts by one seat. They also won the popular vote, getting 51% of the vote. Despite this however, Democrats only won 49 seats (41% of the total number of seats).

Democrats won the state House for the first time since 2008.

== Background ==
Republicans have controlled the North Carolina House of Representatives since the 2010 election. Republicans lost their supermajority in the chamber in the 2024 election, greatly increasing the veto power of incoming Democratic governor Josh Stein. Prior to the swearing-in of the new legislature, however, Republicans overrode the veto of outgoing governor Roy Cooper to strip numerous powers from statewide offices which Democrats had won. Despite the loss of their supermajority, Republicans have still managed to override several of Stein's vetoes through crossover support from Democrats. As it had in previous election cycles, this left the Democrats who voted with Republicans vulnerable to primary challenges, including some challengers supported directly by Stein. Ultimately, three Democrats, Shelly Willingham, Carla Cunningham, and Nasif Majeed, lost renomination to more progressive challengers, often by large margins. Cunningham and Majeed both switched parties to become independents after their primary losses.

== Predictions ==
Source	Ranking	As of
Sabato's Crystal Ball	Likely R	October 16, 2026
State Navigate	Tilt D (flip)	October 26, 2026

== Polling ==
Poll source	Date(s) administered	Sample size (Note: Key: A – all adults RV – registered voters LV – likely voters V – unclear)	Margin of error	Republican	Democratic	Other	Undecided
Catawba College/YouGov	September 4–15, 2026	885 (LV)	–	39%	48%	1% (Note: "I would not vote in this race" with 1%; "I would vote for another candidate" with 0%)	13%
Harper Polling (R)	May 10–11, 2026	600 (LV)	± 4.0%	41%	48%	–	11%
High Point University/YouGov	March 26 – April 6, 2026	703 (LV)	± 4.3%	43%	47%	2%	7%
High Point University/YouGov	March 26 – April 6, 2026	800 (RV)	± 4.1%	41%	45%	2%	11%
Harper Polling (R) (Note: Poll sponsored by The Carolina Journal)	March 22–23, 2026	600 (LV)	± 4.0%	43%	45%	–	12%
Change Research (D)	January 31 – February 4, 2026	1,069 (V)	± 3.1%	42%	45%	–	14%
Change Research (D) (Note: Poll sponsored by Carolina Forward)	January 5–7, 2026	1,105 (LV)	± 3.5%	43%	43%	–	14%

== Results summary ==
District	2024 Pres.	Incumbent	Party	Elected	Party
1st	R+29.7	Ed Goodwin	Rep	Ed Goodwin	Rep
2nd	D+10.1	Ray Jeffers	Dem	Ray Jeffers	Dem
3rd	R+20.1	Steve Tyson	Rep	Steve Tyson	Rep
4th	R+24.3	Jimmy Dixon	Rep	Jimmy Dixon	Rep
5th	R+6.7	Bill Ward	Rep	Sam Davis III	Dem
6th	R+22.2	Joe Pike	Rep	Joe Pike	Rep
7th	R+12.5	Matthew Winslow†	Rep	Mark Speed	Dem
8th	D+26.8	Gloristine Brown	Dem	Gloristine Brown	Dem
9th	R+9.8	Timothy Reeder	Rep	Claire Kempner	Dem
10th	R+16.3	John Bell	Rep	John Bell	Rep
11th	D+32.5	Allison Dahle	Dem	Allison Dahle	Dem
12th	R+11.6	Chris Humphrey	Rep	Chris Humphrey	Rep
13th	R+40.4	Celeste Cairns	Rep	Celeste Cairns	Rep
14th	R+31.4	Wyatt Gable	Rep	Wyatt Gable	Rep
15th	R+33.4	Phil Shepard	Rep	Phil Shepard	Rep
16th	R+39.2	Carson Smith	Rep	Carson Smith	Rep
17th	R+23.1	Frank Iler	Rep	Frank Iler	Rep
18th	D+21.3	Deb Butler	Dem	Deb Butler	Dem
19th	R+20.9	Charlie Miller	Rep	Charlie Miller	Rep
20th	R+10.2	Ted Davis Jr.†	Rep	Tim Merrick	Dem
21st	D+26.3	Ya Liu	Dem	Ya Liu	Dem
22nd	R+26.9	William Brisson†	Rep	Wellie Jackson	Rep
23rd	D+17.0	Shelly Willingham	Dem	Patricia Smith	Dem
24th	R+1.7	Dante Pittman	Dem	Dante Pittman	Dem
25th	D+0.1	Allen Chesser	Rep	Lorenza Wilkins	Dem
26th	R+11.6	Donna McDowell White	Rep	L'Bertrice Solomon	Dem
27th	D+17.0	Rodney Pierce	Dem	Rodney Pierce	Dem
28th	R+34.1	Larry Strickland	Rep	Larry Strickland	Rep
29th	D+68.3	Vernetta Alston	Dem	Vernetta Alston	Dem
30th	D+71.0	Marcia Morey	Dem	Marcia Morey	Dem
31st	D+60.1	Zack Forde-Hawkins	Dem	Zack Forde-Hawkins	Dem
32nd	D+0.5	Bryan Cohn	Dem	Bryan Cohn	Dem
33rd	D+41.1	Monika Johnson-Hostler	Dem	Monika Johnson-Hostler	Dem
34th	D+30.8	Tim Longest	Dem	Tim Longest	Dem
35th	R+1.9	Mike Schietzelt	Rep	Evonne Hopkins	Dem
36th	D+11.7	Julie von Haefen	Dem	Julie von Haefen	Dem
37th	R+2.9	Erin Paré	Rep	Winn Decker	Dem
38th	D+62.0	Abe Jones	Dem	Abe Jones	Dem
39th	D+25.1	James Roberson	Dem	James Roberson	Dem
40th	D+27.7	Phil Rubin	Dem	Phil Rubin	Dem
41st	D+34.1	Maria Cervania	Dem	Maria Cervania	Dem
42nd	D+46.5	Mike Colvin	Dem	Mike Colvin	Dem
43rd	R+12.5	Diane Wheatley	Rep	Janene Ackles	Dem
44th	D+20.4	Charles Smith	Dem	Charles Smith	Dem
45th	D+15.0	Frances Jackson	Dem	Frances Jackson	Dem
46th	R+34.8	Brenden Jones	Rep	Brenden Jones	Rep
47th	R+24.0	John Lowery	Rep	John Lowery	Rep
48th	D+0.9	Garland Pierce	Dem	Garland Pierce	Dem
49th	D+40.2	Cynthia Ball	Dem	Cynthia Ball	Dem
50th	D+15.1	Renee Price	Dem	Renee Price	Dem
51st	R+25.7	John Sauls†	Rep	April Montgomery	Ind
52nd	R+18.9	Ben Moss	Rep	Ben Moss	Rep
53rd	R+25.6	Howard Penny Jr.	Rep	Howard Penny Jr.	Rep
54th	D+8.4	Robert Reives	Dem	Robert Reives	Dem
55th	R+25.8	Mark Brody†	Rep	Clancy Baucom	Rep
56th	D+71.5	Allen Buansi	Dem	Allen Buansi	Dem
57th	D+35.3	Tracy Clark	Dem	Tracy Clark	Dem
58th	D+49.8	Amos Quick	Dem	Amos Quick	Dem
59th	R+9.9	Alan Branson	Rep	Elma Hairston	Dem
60th	D+24.3	Amanda Cook	Dem	Amanda Cook	Dem
61st	D+56.0	Pricey Harrison	Dem	Pricey Harrison	Dem
62nd	R+6.0	John Blust	Rep	Shelly Headen	Dem
63rd	R+7.7	Stephen Ross†	Rep	Ian Baltutis	Dem
64th	R+8.6	Dennis Riddell	Rep	LeVon Barnes	Dem
65th	R+35.8	Reece Pyrtle	Rep	Seth Woodall	Rep
66th	D+27.5	Sarah Crawford	Dem	Sarah Crawford	Dem
67th	R+47.4	Cody Huneycutt	Rep	Cody Huneycutt	Rep
68th	R+20.7	David Willis	Rep	David Willis	Rep
69th	R+24.9	Dean Arp	Rep	Dean Arp	Rep
70th	R+52.9	Brian Biggs	Rep	Brian Biggs	Rep
71st	D+38.3	Kanika Brown	Dem	Kanika Brown	Dem
72nd	D+48.8	Amber Baker	Dem	Amber Baker	Dem
73rd	R+6.4	Jonathan Almond	Rep	Thomas Monks	Dem
74th	R+7.4	Jeff Zenger	Rep	Amy Taylor North	Dem
75th	R+11.9	Donny Lambeth	Rep	Jen Wiles	Dem
76th	R+24.1	Harry Warren†	Rep	Greg Edds	Rep
77th	R+53.2	Julia Craven Howard	Rep	Julia Craven Howard	Rep
78th	R+49.5	Neal Jackson	Rep	Neal Jackson	Rep
79th	R+27.3	Keith Kidwell	Rep	Darren Armstrong	Rep
80th	R+50.4	Sam Watford	Rep	Sam Watford	Rep
81st	R+43.5	Larry Potts	Rep	Larry Potts	Rep
82nd	R+8.5	Brian Echevarria	Rep	Chris Bishopp	Dem
83rd	R+31.2	Grant Campbell	Rep	Grant Campbell	Rep
84th	R+35.8	Jeffrey McNeely	Rep	Jeffrey McNeely	Rep
85th	R+46.9	Dudley Greene	Rep	Dudley Greene	Rep
86th	R+41.1	Hugh Blackwell	Rep	Hugh Blackwell	Rep
87th	R+49.2	Destin Hall	Rep	Destin Hall	Rep
88th	D+37.9	Mary Belk	Dem	Mary Belk	Dem
89th	R+49.1	Mitchell Setzer	Rep	Mitchell Setzer	Rep
90th	R+56.4	Dan Kiger	Rep	Dan Kiger	Rep
91st	R+34.4	Kyle Hall	Rep	Kyle Hall	Rep
92nd	D+38.8	Terry Brown	Dem	Terry Brown	Dem
93rd	R+16.2	Ray Pickett	Rep	Charlie Wallin	Dem
94th	R+57.6	Blair Eddins	Rep	Blair Eddins	Rep
95th	R+27.2	Todd Carver	Rep	Todd Carver	Rep
96th	R+26.7	Jay Adams	Rep	Jay Adams	Rep
97th	R+45.6	Heather Rhyne	Rep	Heather Rhyne	Rep
98th	D+2.6	Beth Helfrich	Dem	Beth Helfrich	Dem
99th	D+63.9	Nasif Majeed	Ind	Veleria Levy	Dem
100th	D+25.1	Julia Greenfield	Dem	Julia Greenfield	Dem
101st	D+37.4	Carolyn Logan	Dem	Carolyn Logan	Dem
102nd	D+48.4	Becky Carney	Dem	Becky Carney	Dem
103rd	D+14.5	Laura Budd	Dem	Laura Budd	Dem
104th	D+19.1	Brandon Lofton	Dem	Brandon Lofton	Dem
105th	D+0.6	Tricia Cotham	Rep	Ken McCool	Dem
106th	D+50.8	Carla Cunningham	Ind	Rodney Sadler	Dem
107th	D+59.5	Aisha Dew	Dem	Aisha Dew	Dem
108th	R+29.9	John Torbett	Rep	John Torbett	Rep
109th	R+14.9	Donnie Loftis	Rep	Mark Carver	Dem
110th	R+32.2	Kelly Hastings	Rep	Caroline Eason	Rep
111th	R+47.7	Paul Scott	Rep	Paul Scott	Rep
112th	D+52.1	Jordan Lopez	Dem	Jordan Lopez	Dem
113th	R+31.4	Jake Johnson	Rep	Jake Johnson	Rep
114th	D+17.5	Eric Ager	Dem	Eric Ager	Dem
115th	R+2.9	Lindsey Prather	Dem	Lindsey Prather	Dem
116th	D+60.7	Brian Turner	Dem	Brian Turner	Dem
117th	R+11.9	Jennifer Balkcom†	Rep	Lynne Russo	Dem
118th	R+24.6	Mark Pless	Rep	Jimmy Rogers	Rep
119th	R+12.5	Anna Ferguson	Rep	Mark Burrows	Dem
120th	R+48.6	Karl Gillespie	Rep	Karl Gillespie	Rep

† - Incumbent not seeking re-election

Party	Seats contested	Current seats
Republican	96	71
Democratic	118	49
Libertarian	9	0
Total	223	120

=== Retirements ===
==== Republicans ====
- District 7: Matthew Winslow retired.
- District 20: Ted Davis Jr. retired.
- District 22: William Brisson retired.
- District 51: John Sauls retired.
- District 55: Mark Brody retired.
- District 63: Stephen Ross retired.
- District 76: Harry Warren retired to run for Rowan County Clerk of Superior Court.
- District 117: Jennifer Balkcom retired to run for Congress in North Carolina's 11th congressional district.

=== Incumbents defeated in the primary election ===
Four Republican and three Democratic incumbents lost renomination in their respective primary elections.

==== Republicans ====
- District 65: Reece Pyrtle lost renomination to Seth Woodall.
- District 79: Keith Kidwell lost renomination to Darren Armstrong.
- District 110: Kelly Hastings lost renomination to Caroline Eason.
- District 118: Mark Pless lost renomination to Jimmy Rogers.

==== Democrats ====
- District 23: Shelly Willingham lost renomination to Patricia Smith.
- District 99: Nasif Majeed lost renomination to Veleria Levy.
- District 106: Carla Cunningham lost renomination to Rodney Sadler.

=== Incumbents defeated in the general election ===
- District 5: Bill Ward (R) lost reelection to Sam Davis III (D)
- District 9: Timothy Reeder (R) lost reelection to Claire Kempner (D)
- District 25: Allen Chesser (R) lost reelection to Lorenza Wilkins (D)
- District 26: Donna McDowell White (R) lost reelection to L'Bertice Solomon (D)
- District 35: Mike Schietzelt (R) lost reelection to Evonne Hopkins (D)
- District 37: Erin Paré (R) lost reelection to Winn Decker (D)
- District 43: Diane Wheatley (R) lost reelection to Janene Ackles (D)
- District 59: Alan Branson (R) lost reelection to Elma Hairston (D)
- District 62: John Blust (R) lost reelection to Shelly Headen (D)
- District 64: Dennis Riddell (R) lost reelection to LeVon Barnes (D)
- District 73: Jonathan Almond (R) lost reelection to Thomas Monks (D)
- District 74: Jeff Zenger (R) lost reelection to Amy Taylor North (D)
- District 75: Donny Lambeth (R) lost reelection to Jen Wiles (D)
- District 82: Brian Echevarria (R) lost reelection to Chris Bishopp (D)
- District 93: Ray Pickett (R) lost reelection to Charlie Wallin (D)
- District 105: Tricia Cotham (R) lost reelection to Ken McCool (D)
- District 109: Donnie Loftis (R) lost reelection to Mark Carver (D)
- District 119: Anna Ferguson (R) lost reelection to Mark Burrows (D)

=== Open seats that changed parties ===
- District 7: won by Mark Speed (D)
- District 20: won by Tim Merrick (D)
- District 51: won by April Montgomery (I)
- District 63: won by Ian Baltutis (D)
- District 99: won by Veleria Levy (D)
- District 106: won by Rodney Sadler (D)
- District 117: won by Lynne Russo (D)

== Detailed results ==
=== Districts 1-19 ===
==== District 1 ====
Incumbent Republican Ed Goodwin has represented the 1st district since 2019.

North Carolina House of Representatives 1st district Republican primary election, 2026
Party	Candidate	Votes	%
Republican	Ed Goodwin (incumbent)	5,078	52.51%
Republican	John Spruill	4,593	47.49%
Total votes		9,671	100%

North Carolina House of Representatives 1st district general election, 2026
Party	Candidate	Votes	%
Republican	Ed Goodwin (incumbent)	22,515	60.10%
Democratic	Miriam Rollin	14,946	39.90%
Total votes		37,461	100%
Republican hold			

==== District 2 ====
Incumbent Democrat Ray Jeffers has represented the 2nd district since 2023.

North Carolina House of Representatives 2nd district general election, 2026
Party	Candidate	Votes	%
Democratic	Ray Jeffers (incumbent)	28,308	100%
Total votes		28,308	100%
Democratic hold			

==== District 3 ====
Incumbent Republican Steve Tyson has represented the 3rd district since 2021.

North Carolina House of Representatives 3rd district general election, 2026
Party	Candidate	Votes	%
Republican	Steve Tyson (incumbent)	20,926	55.88%
Democratic	Diannia Bright	15,630	41.74%
Libertarian	Angela Humphries	892	2.38%
Total votes		37,448	100%
Republican hold			

==== District 4 ====
Incumbent Republican Jimmy Dixon has represented the 4th district since 2011.

North Carolina House of Representatives 4th district Republican primary election, 2026
Party	Candidate	Votes	%
Republican	Jimmy Dixon (incumbent)	5,489	81.67%
Republican	Marcella Barbour	1,232	18.33%
Total votes		6,721	100%

North Carolina House of Representatives 4th district general election, 2026
Party	Candidate	Votes	%
Republican	Jimmy Dixon (incumbent)	13,831	55.01%
Democratic	Vernon Moore	11,313	44.99%
Total votes		25,144	100%
Republican hold			

==== District 5 ====
Incumbent Republican Bill Ward, who had represented the 5th district since 2023, lost re-election to Democrat Sam Davis III.

North Carolina House of Representatives 5th district general election, 2026
Party	Candidate	Votes	%
Democratic	Sam Davis III	16,223	52.93%
Republican	Bill Ward (incumbent)	14,425	47.08%
Total votes		30,648	100%
Democratic gain from Republican			

==== District 6 ====
Incumbent Republican Joe Pike has represented the 6th district since 2023.

North Carolina House of Representatives 6th district Democratic primary election, 2026
Party	Candidate	Votes	%
Democratic	Tony Spears	2,489	60.32%
Democratic	Joshua Estep	1,637	39.68%
Total votes		4,126	100%

North Carolina House of Representatives 6th district Republican primary election, 2026
Party	Candidate	Votes	%
Republican	Joe Pike (incumbent)	2,139	53.39%
Republican	W. H. (Bill) Morris	1,867	46.61%
Total votes		4,006	100%

North Carolina House of Representatives 6th district general election, 2026
Party	Candidate	Votes	%
Republican	Joe Pike (incumbent)	14,620	50.97%
Democratic	Tony Spears	14,065	49.03%
Total votes		28,685	100%
Republican hold			

==== District 7 ====
Incumbent Republican Matthew Winslow has represented the 7th district since 2021. Winslow didn't seek re-election. Democrat Mark Speed won the open seat.

North Carolina House of Representatives 7th district general election, 2026
Party	Candidate	Votes	%
Democratic	Mark Speed	19,997	51.62%
Republican	Cory Thornton	18,744	48.38%
Total votes		38,741	100%
Democratic gain from Republican			

==== District 8 ====
Incumbent Democrat Gloristine Brown has represented the 8th district since 2023.

North Carolina House of Representatives 8th district general election, 2026
Party	Candidate	Votes	%
Democratic	Gloristine Brown (incumbent)	18,813	71.45%
Republican	Cathy Thorne Bynum	7,517	28.55%
Total votes		26,330	100%
Democratic hold			

==== District 9 ====
Incumbent Republican Timothy Reeder, who had represented the 9th district since 2023, lost re-election to Democrat Claire Kempner in a rematch of the 2024 election.

North Carolina House of Representatives 9th district Democratic primary election, 2026
Party	Candidate	Votes	%
Democratic	Claire Kempner	4,797	67.21%
Democratic	Lenton Brown	2,340	32.79%
Total votes		7,137	100%

North Carolina House of Representatives 9th district general election, 2026
Party	Candidate	Votes	%
Democratic	Claire Kempner	18,358	50.30%
Republican	Timothy Reeder (incumbent)	18,136	49.70%
Total votes		36,494	100%
Democratic gain from Republican			

==== District 10 ====
Incumbent Republican John Bell has represented the 10th district since 2013.

North Carolina House of Representatives 10th district general election, 2026
Party	Candidate	Votes	%
Republican	John Bell (incumbent)	16,084	54.80%
Democratic	Zyaire Webb	13,265	45.20%
Total votes		29,349	100%
Republican hold			

==== District 11 ====
Incumbent Democrat Allison Dahle has represented the 11th district since 2019.

North Carolina House of Representatives 11th district general election, 2026
Party	Candidate	Votes	%
Democratic	Allison Dahle (incumbent)	30,075	81.40%
Libertarian	Matthew Kordon	6,872	18.60%
Total votes		36,947	100%
Democratic hold			

==== District 12 ====
Incumbent Republican Chris Humphrey has represented the 12th district since 2019.

North Carolina House of Representatives 12th district general election, 2026
Party	Candidate	Votes	%
Republican	Chris Humphrey (incumbent)	15,486	52.06%
Democratic	Don Hardy	14,262	47.94%
Total votes		29,748	100%
Republican hold			

==== District 13 ====
Incumbent Republican Celeste Cairns has represented the 13th district since 2023.

North Carolina House of Representatives 13th district general election, 2026
Party	Candidate	Votes	%
Republican	Celeste Cairns (incumbent)	25,605	65.24%
Democratic	Jason Moore	13,641	34.76%
Total votes		39,246	100%
Republican hold			

==== District 14 ====
Incumbent Republican Wyatt Gable has represented the 14th district since 2025.

North Carolina House of Representatives 14th district general election, 2026
Party	Candidate	Votes	%
Republican	Wyatt Gable (incumbent)	10,579	100%
Total votes		10,579	100%
Republican hold			

==== District 15 ====
Incumbent Republican Phil Shepard has represented the 15th district since 2011.

North Carolina House of Representatives 15th district general election, 2026
Party	Candidate	Votes	%
Republican	Phil Shepard (incumbent)	13,681	56.83%
Democratic	Christopher Schulte	10,391	43.17%
Total votes		24,072	100%
Republican hold			

==== District 16 ====
Incumbent Republican Carson Smith has represented the 16th district since 2019.

North Carolina House of Representatives 16th district Republican primary election, 2026
Party	Candidate	Votes	%
Republican	Carson Smith (incumbent)	6,380	76.48%
Republican	Joshua Patti	1,962	23.52%
Total votes		8,342	100%

North Carolina House of Representatives 16th district general election, 2026
Party	Candidate	Votes	%
Republican	Carson Smith (incumbent)	22,024	62.57%
Democratic	Jim Harris	13,176	37.43%
Total votes		35,200	100%
Republican hold			

==== District 17 ====
Incumbent Republican Frank Iler has represented the 17th district since 2009.

North Carolina House of Representatives 17th district Republican primary election, 2026
Party	Candidate	Votes	%
Republican	Frank Iler (incumbent)	8,385	74.38%
Republican	Nia Moore	2,888	25.62%
Total votes		11,273	100%

North Carolina House of Representatives 17th district general election, 2026
Party	Candidate	Votes	%
Republican	Frank Iler (incumbent)	30,075	54.51%
Democratic	Dennis Breen	25,096	45.49%
Total votes		55,171	100%
Republican hold			

==== District 18 ====
Incumbent Democrat Deb Butler has represented the 18th district since 2017.

North Carolina House of Representatives 18th district general election, 2026
Party	Candidate	Votes	%
Democratic	Deb Butler (incumbent)	25,033	70.42%
Republican	Latisha Grady	10,516	29.58%
Total votes		35,549	100%
Democratic hold			

==== District 19 ====
Incumbent Republican Charlie Miller has represented the 19th district since 2021.

North Carolina House of Representatives 19th district general election, 2026
Party	Candidate	Votes	%
Republican	Charlie Miller (incumbent)	29,843	55.26%
Democratic	Scott Nasif	24,157	44.74%
Total votes		54,000	100%
Republican hold			

=== Districts 20-39 ===
==== District 20 ====
Incumbent Republican Ted Davis Jr. has represented the 20th district and its predecessors since 2012. Davis Jr. didn't seek re-election. Democrat Tim Merrick won the open set.

North Carolina House of Representatives 20th district general election, 2026
Party	Candidate	Votes	%
Democratic	Tim Merrick	22,156	50.09%
Republican	Dane Scalise	22,079	49.91%
Total votes		44,235	100%
Democratic gain from Republican			

==== District 21 ====
Incumbent Democrat Ya Liu has represented the 21st district since 2023.

North Carolina House of Representatives 21st district general election, 2026
Party	Candidate	Votes	%
Democratic	Ya Liu (incumbent)	29,221	71.33%
Republican	Bryson Johnson	11,744	28.67%
Total votes		40,965	100%
Democratic hold			

==== District 22 ====
Incumbent Republican William Brisson has represented the 22nd district since 2007. Brisson didn't seek re-election. Republican Wellie Jackson won the open seat.

North Carolina House of Representatives 22nd district Republican primary election, 2026
Party	Candidate	Votes	%
Republican	Wellie Jackson	7,155	77.23%
Republican	Jerol Kivett	2,109	22.77%
Total votes		9,264	100%

North Carolina House of Representatives 22nd district general election, 2026
Party	Candidate	Votes	%
Republican	Wellie Jackson	19,187	100%
Total votes		19,187	100%
Republican hold			

==== District 23 ====
Incumbent Democrat Shelly Willingham has represented the 23rd district since 2015. Willingham lost the Democratic nomination to Patricia Smith, who went on to win the general election.

North Carolina House of Representatives 23rd district Democratic primary election, 2026
Party	Candidate	Votes	%
Democratic	Patricia Smith	5,231	55.70%
Democratic	Shelly Willingham (incumbent)	4,161	44.30%
Total votes		9,392	100%

North Carolina House of Representatives 23rd district general election, 2026
Party	Candidate	Votes	%
Democratic	Patricia Smith	20,805	61.55%
Republican	Brent Roberson	12,995	38.45%
Total votes		33,800	100%
Democratic hold			

==== District 24 ====
Incumbent Democrat Dante Pittman has represented the 24th district since 2025.

North Carolina House of Representatives 24th district general election, 2026
Party	Candidate	Votes	%
Democratic	Dante Pittman (incumbent)	18,132	58.31%
Republican	Blake Boykin	12,964	41.69%
Total votes		31,096	100%
Democratic hold			

==== District 25 ====
Incumbent Republican Allen Chesser, who had represented the 25th district since 2023, lost re-election to Democrat Lorenza Wilkins.

North Carolina House of Representatives 25th district Democratic primary election, 2026
Party	Candidate	Votes	%
Democratic	Lorenza Wilkins	4,964	57.07%
Democratic	Harris Walker	3,734	42.93%
Total votes		8,698	100%

North Carolina House of Representatives 25th district general election, 2026
Party	Candidate	Votes	%
Democratic	Lorenza Wilkins	20,563	52.76%
Republican	Allen Chesser (incumbent)	17,392	44.63%
Libertarian	Nick Taylor	1,018	2.61%
Total votes		38,973	100%
Democratic gain from Republican			

==== District 26 ====
Incumbent Republican Donna McDowell White, who had represented the 26th district since 2017, lost re-election to Democrat L'Bertice Solomon.

North Carolina House of Representatives 26th district Republican primary election, 2026
Party	Candidate	Votes	%
Republican	Donna McDowell White (incumbent)	4,816	70.46%
Republican	Margie Beth Riedel	2,019	29.54%
Total votes		6,835	100%

North Carolina House of Representatives 26th district general election, 2026
Party	Candidate	Votes	%
Democratic	L'Bertice Solomon	21,749	53.03%
Republican	Donna McDowell White (incumbent)	19,264	46.97%
Total votes		41,013	100%
Democratic gain from Republican			

==== District 27 ====
Incumbent Democrat Rodney Pierce has represented the 27th district since 2025.

North Carolina House of Representatives 27th district Democratic primary election, 2026
Party	Candidate	Votes	%
Democratic	Rodney Pierce (incumbent)	8,715	64.17%
Democratic	Michael Wray	4,866	35.83%
Total votes		13,581	100%

North Carolina House of Representatives 27th district general election, 2026
Party	Candidate	Votes	%
Democratic	Rodney Pierce (incumbent)	20,753	63.57%
Republican	David Woodson	11,893	36.43%
Total votes		32,646	100%
Democratic hold			

==== District 28 ====
Incumbent Republican Larry Strickland has represented the 28th district since 2017.

North Carolina House of Representatives 28th district Republican primary election, 2026
Party	Candidate	Votes	%
Republican	Larry Strickland (incumbent)	7,056	89.11%
Republican	Eric Bowles Sr.	862	10.89%
Total votes		7,918	100%

North Carolina House of Representatives 28th district general election, 2026
Party	Candidate	Votes	%
Republican	Larry Strickland (incumbent)	17,180	58.17%
Democratic	D. Matthew Bailey	12,353	41.83%
Total votes		29,533	100%
Republican hold			

==== District 29 ====
Incumbent Democrat Vernetta Alston has represented the 29th district since 2020.

North Carolina House of Representatives 29th district general election, 2026
Party	Candidate	Votes	%
Democratic	Vernetta Alston (incumbent)	41,114	100%
Total votes		41,114	100%
Democratic hold			

==== District 30 ====
Incumbent Democrat Marcia Morey has represented the 30th district since 2017.

North Carolina House of Representatives 30th district general election, 2026
Party	Candidate	Votes	%
Democratic	Marcia Morey (incumbent)	34,935	92.95%
Libertarian	Ray Ubinger	2,650	7.05%
Total votes		37,585	100%
Democratic hold			

==== District 31 ====
Incumbent Democrat Zack Forde-Hawkins has represented the 31st district since 2019.

North Carolina House of Representatives 31st district general election, 2026
Party	Candidate	Votes	%
Democratic	Zack Forde-Hawkins (incumbent)	37,286	100%
Total votes		37,286	100%
Democratic hold			

==== District 32 ====
Incumbent Democrat Bryan Cohn has represented the 32nd district since 2025. Cohn initially chose not seek re-election; Democratic nominee Curtis McRae later withdrew from the race due to health issues and Cohn re-entered the race to replace McRae as the Democratic nominee.

North Carolina House of Representatives 32nd district Democratic primary election, 2026
Party	Candidate	Votes	%
Democratic	Curtis McRae	5,073	63.73%
Democratic	Melissa Elliott	2,887	36.27%
Total votes		7,960	100%

North Carolina House of Representatives 32nd district Republican primary election, 2026
Party	Candidate	Votes	%
Republican	Frank Sossamon	4,996	88.44%
Republican	Pamela Ayscue	653	11.56%
Total votes		5,649	100%

North Carolina House of Representatives 32nd district general election, 2026
Party	Candidate	Votes	%
Democratic	Bryan Cohn (incumbent)	18,562	55.50%
Republican	Frank Sossamon	14,883	44.50%
Total votes		33,445	100%
Democratic hold			

==== District 33 ====
Incumbent Democrat Monika Johnson-Hostler has represented the 33rd district since 2025.

North Carolina House of Representatives 33rd district general election, 2026
Party	Candidate	Votes	%
Democratic	Monika Johnson-Hostler (incumbent)	29,605	79.12%
Republican	Matthew Orr	7,815	20.88%
Total votes		37,420	100%
Democratic hold			

==== District 34 ====
Incumbent Democrat Tim Longest has represented the 34th district since 2023.

North Carolina House of Representatives 34th district general election, 2026
Party	Candidate	Votes	%
Democratic	Tim Longest (incumbent)	29,897	81.60%
Libertarian	Ed George	6,743	18.40%
Total votes		36,640	100%
Democratic hold			

==== District 35 ====
Incumbent Republican Mike Schietzelt, who had represented the 35th district since 2025, lost re-election to Democrat Evonne Hopkins in a rematch of the 2024 election for this seat.

North Carolina House of Representatives 35th district Republican primary election, 2026
Party	Candidate	Votes	%
Republican	Mike Schietzelt (incumbent)	5,047	90.99%
Republican	Michele Joyner-Dinwiddie	500	9.01%
Total votes		5,547	100%

North Carolina House of Representatives 35th district general election, 2026
Party	Candidate	Votes	%
Democratic	Evonne Hopkins	25,659	54.96%
Republican	Mike Schietzelt (incumbent)	21,030	45.04%
Total votes		46,689	100%
Democratic gain from Republican			

==== District 36 ====
Incumbent Democrat Julie von Haefen has represented the 36th district since 2019.

North Carolina House of Representatives 36th district general election, 2026
Party	Candidate	Votes	%
Democratic	Julie von Haefen (incumbent)	26,715	62.99%
Republican	Mary Insprucker	15,699	37.01%
Total votes		42,414	100%
Democratic hold			

==== District 37 ====
Incumbent Republican Erin Paré, who had represented the 37th district since 2021, lost re-election to Democrat Winn Decker.

North Carolina House of Representatives 37th district Democratic primary election, 2026
Party	Candidate	Votes	%
Democratic	Winn Decker	4,720	50.34%
Democratic	Marcus Gadson	3,568	38.05%
Democratic	Ralph Clements	1,088	11.60%
Total votes		9,376	100%

North Carolina House of Representatives 37th district general election, 2026
Party	Candidate	Votes	%
Democratic	Winn Decker	26,755	54.74%
Republican	Erin Paré (incumbent)	22,119	45.26%
Total votes		48,874	100%
Democratic gain from Republican			

==== District 38 ====
Incumbent Democrat Abe Jones has represented the 38th District since 2021.

North Carolina House of Representatives 38th district Democratic primary election, 2026
Party	Candidate	Votes	%
Democratic	Abe Jones (incumbent)	7,417	69.63%
Democratic	Collin Fearns	3,235	30.37%
Total votes		10,652	100%

North Carolina House of Representatives 38th district general election, 2026
Party	Candidate	Votes	%
Democratic	Abe Jones (incumbent)	27,996	100%
Total votes		27,996	100%
Democratic hold			

==== District 39 ====
Incumbent Democrat James Roberson has represented the 39th district since 2021.

North Carolina House of Representatives 39th district general election, 2026
Party	Candidate	Votes	%
Democratic	James Roberson (incumbent)	30,026	72.60%
Republican	Jorge Cordova	10,365	25.06%
Libertarian	Wayne Cockrell	969	2.34%
Total votes		41,360	100%
Democratic hold			

=== Districts 40-59 ===
==== District 40 ====
Incumbent Democrat Phil Rubin has represented the 40th district since his appointment in 2025.

North Carolina House of Representatives 40th district general election, 2026
Party	Candidate	Votes	%
Democratic	Phil Rubin (incumbent)	31,524	80.80%
Libertarian	Lucas Everett Jones	7,490	19.20%
Total votes		39,014	100%
Democratic hold			

==== District 41 ====
Incumbent Democrat Maria Cervania has represented the 41st district since 2023.

North Carolina House of Representatives 41st district general election, 2026
Party	Candidate	Votes	%
Democratic	Maria Cervania (incumbent)	27,720	76.25%
Republican	Bruce Forster	8,632	23.75%
Total votes		36,352	100%
Democratic hold			

==== District 42 ====
Incumbent Democrat Mike Colvin has represented the 42nd district since 2025.

North Carolina House of Representatives 42nd district general election, 2026
Party	Candidate	Votes	%
Democratic	Mike Colvin (incumbent)	14,786	100%
Total votes		14,786	100%
Democratic hold			

==== District 43 ====
Incumbent Republican Diane Wheatley, who had represented the 43rd district since 2021, lost re-election to Democrat Janene Ackles in a rematch of the 2024 election for this seat.

North Carolina House of Representatives 43rd district Democratic primary election, 2026
Party	Candidate	Votes	%
Democratic	Janene Ackles	3,913	67.03%
Democratic	Ronald Pittman	1,925	32.97%
Total votes		5,838	100%

North Carolina House of Representatives 43rd district Republican primary election, 2026
Party	Candidate	Votes	%
Republican	Diane Wheatley (incumbent)	2,397	59.49%
Republican	Clarence Goins Jr.	1,632	40.51%
Total votes		4,029	100%

North Carolina House of Representatives 43rd district general election, 2026
Party	Candidate	Votes	%
Democratic	Janene Ackles	15,899	52.15%
Republican	Diane Wheatley (incumbent)	14,589	47.85%
Total votes		30,488	100%
Democratic gain from Republican			

==== District 44 ====
Incumbent Democrat Charles Smith has represented the 44th district since 2023.

North Carolina House of Representatives 44th district general election, 2026
Party	Candidate	Votes	%
Democratic	Charles Smith (incumbent)	17,929	100%
Total votes		17,929	100%
Democratic hold			

==== District 45 ====
Incumbent Democrat Frances Jackson has represented the 45th district since 2023.

North Carolina House of Representatives 45th district Democratic primary election, 2026
Party	Candidate	Votes	%
Democratic	Frances Jackson (incumbent)	3,373	60.02%
Democratic	QuDerrick Covington	2,247	39.98%
Total votes		5,620	100%

North Carolina House of Representatives 45th district general election, 2026
Party	Candidate	Votes	%
Democratic	Frances Jackson (incumbent)	18,074	100%
Total votes		18,074	100%
Democratic hold			

==== District 46 ====
Incumbent Republican Brenden Jones has represented the 46th district since 2017.

North Carolina House of Representatives 46th district general election, 2026
Party	Candidate	Votes	%
Republican	Brenden Jones (incumbent)	15,137	59.34%
Democratic	Brittany Newton	10,372	40.66%
Total votes		25,509	100%
Republican hold			

==== District 47 ====
Incumbent Republican John Lowery has represented the 47th district since 2025, when he was appointed to succeed his brother Jarrod Lowery.

North Carolina House of Representatives 47th district general election, 2026
Party	Candidate	Votes	%
Republican	John Lowery (incumbent)	11,284	53.93%
Democratic	Eshonda Hooper	9,640	46.07%
Total votes		20,924	100%
Republican hold			

==== District 48 ====
Incumbent Democrat Garland Pierce has represented the 48th district since 2005.

North Carolina House of Representatives 48th district Republican primary election, 2026
Party	Candidate	Votes	%
Republican	Ralph Carter	2,105	59.33%
Republican	Kirk Lowery	1,443	40.67%
Total votes		3,548	100%

North Carolina House of Representatives 48th district general election, 2026
Party	Candidate	Votes	%
Democratic	Garland Pierce (incumbent)	16,004	60.71%
Republican	Ralph Carter	10,357	39.29%
Total votes		26,361	100%
Democratic hold			

==== District 49 ====
Incumbent Democrat Cynthia Ball has represented the 49th district since 2017.

North Carolina House of Representatives 49th district general election, 2026
Party	Candidate	Votes	%
Democratic	Cynthia Ball (incumbent)	25,363	79.03%
Republican	Daran Thomas	6,731	20.97%
Total votes		32,094	100%
Democratic hold			

==== District 50 ====
Incumbent Democrat Renee Price has represented the 50th district since 2023.

North Carolina House of Representatives 50th district Democratic primary election, 2026
Party	Candidate	Votes	%
Democratic	Renee Price (incumbent)	10,189	74.01%
Democratic	Mary Lucas	3,039	22.07%
Democratic	Brandall Redd	539	3.92%
Total votes		13,767	100%

North Carolina House of Representatives 50th district general election, 2026
Party	Candidate	Votes	%
Democratic	Renee Price (incumbent)	30,032	100%
Total votes		30,032	100%
Democratic hold			

==== District 51 ====
Incumbent Republican John Sauls has represented the 51st district since 2017. Sauls didn't seek re-election. Independent April Montgomery won the open seat.

North Carolina House of Representatives 51st district Republican primary election, 2026
Party	Candidate	Votes	%
Republican	Charles Taylor	3,005	54.16%
Republican	Sherry Lynn Womack	2,543	45.84%
Total votes		5,548	100%

North Carolina House of Representatives 51st district general election, 2026
Party	Candidate	Votes	%
Independent	April Montgomery	13,992	50.75%
Republican	Charles Taylor	13,579	49.25%
Total votes		27,571	100%
Independent gain from Republican			

==== District 52 ====
Incumbent Republican Ben Moss has represented the 52nd district and its predecessors since 2021.

North Carolina House of Representatives 52nd district general election, 2026
Party	Candidate	Votes	%
Republican	Ben Moss (incumbent)	15,959	51.68%
Democratic	Joe Parfitt	14,920	48.32%
Total votes		30,879	100%
Republican hold			

==== District 53 ====
Incumbent Republican Howard Penny Jr. has represented the 53rd district since 2020.

North Carolina House of Representatives 53rd district general election, 2026
Party	Candidate	Votes	%
Republican	Howard Penny Jr. (incumbent)	17,680	51.51%
Democratic	Kevin Thurman	15,915	46.37%
Libertarian	Christopher Sessions	728	2.12%
Total votes		34,323	100%
Republican hold			

==== District 54 ====
Incumbent Democrat and Minority Leader Robert Reives has represented the 54th district since 2014.

North Carolina House of Representatives 54th district general election, 2026
Party	Candidate	Votes	%
Democratic	Robert Reives (incumbent)	30,616	100%
Total votes		30,616	100%
Democratic hold			

==== District 55 ====
Incumbent Republican Mark Brody has represented the 55th district since 2013. Brody didn't seek re-election. Republican Clancy Baucom won the open seat.

North Carolina House of Representatives 55th district Republican primary election, 2026
Party	Candidate	Votes	%
Republican	Clancy Baucom	4,516	79.19%
Republican	John Powell	792	13.89%
Republican	Richard Miller	395	6.93%
Total votes		5,703	100%

North Carolina House of Representatives 55th district general election, 2026
Party	Candidate	Votes	%
Republican	Clancy Baucom	16,002	55.66%
Democratic	John Kirkpatrick IV	12,745	44.34%
Total votes		28,747	100%
Republican hold			

==== District 56 ====
Incumbent Democrat Allen Buansi has represented the 56th district since 2022.

North Carolina House of Representatives 56th district general election, 2026
Party	Candidate	Votes	%
Democratic	Allen Buansi (incumbent)	35,455	93.10%
Libertarian	Matthew Clements	2,626	6.90%
Total votes		38,081	100%
Democratic hold			

==== District 57 ====
Incumbent Democrat Tracy Clark has represented the 57th district since 2024.

North Carolina House of Representatives 57th district general election, 2026
Party	Candidate	Votes	%
Democratic	Tracy Clark (incumbent)	28,917	100%
Total votes		28,917	100%
Democratic hold			

==== District 58 ====
Incumbent Democrat Amos Quick has represented the 58th District since 2017.

North Carolina House of Representatives 58th district general election, 2026
Party	Candidate	Votes	%
Democratic	Amos Quick (incumbent)	25,101	100%
Total votes		25,101	100%
Democratic hold			

==== District 59 ====
Incumbent Republican Alan Branson, who had represented the 59th district since 2024, lost re-election to Democrat Elma Hairston.

North Carolina House of Representatives 59th district Democratic primary election, 2026
Party	Candidate	Votes	%
Democratic	Elma Hairston	4,649	59.26%
Democratic	C. Bradley Hunt II	3,196	40.74%
Total votes		7,845	100%

North Carolina House of Representatives 59th district general election, 2026
Party	Candidate	Votes	%
Democratic	Elma Hairston	22,477	51.88%
Republican	Alan Branson (incumbent)	20,852	48.12%
Total votes		43,329	100%
Democratic gain from Republican			

=== Districts 60-79 ===
==== District 60 ====
Incumbent Democrat Amanda Cook has represented the 60th district since 2025, when she was appointed to succeed Cecil Brockman.

North Carolina House of Representatives 60th district Democratic primary election, 2026
Party	Candidate	Votes	%
Democratic	Amanda Cook (incumbent)	2,958	42.44%
Democratic	Angie Williams-McMichael	2,068	29.67%
Democratic	Joseph (Joe) Alston	1,136	16.30%
Democratic	Bruce Davis	808	11.59%
Total votes		6,970	100%

North Carolina House of Representatives 60th district general election, 2026
Party	Candidate	Votes	%
Democratic	Amanda Cook (incumbent)	20,300	72.59%
Republican	Joseph Perrotta	7,665	27.41%
Total votes		27,965	100%
Democratic hold			

==== District 61 ====
Incumbent Democrat Pricey Harrison has represented the 61st district and its predecessors since 2005.

North Carolina House of Representatives 61st district general election, 2026
Party	Candidate	Votes	%
Democratic	Pricey Harrison (incumbent)	28,925	100%
Total votes		28,925	100%
Democratic hold			

==== District 62 ====
Incumbent Republican John Blust, who had represented the 62nd district since 2024, lost re-election to Democrat Shelly Headen.

North Carolina House of Representatives 62nd district general election, 2026
Party	Candidate	Votes	%
Democratic	Shelly Headen	21,425	50.31%
Republican	John Blust (incumbent)	21,158	49.69%
Total votes		42,583	100%
Democratic gain from Republican			

==== District 63 ====
Incumbent Republican Stephen Ross has represented the 63rd district since 2023. Ross didn't seek re-election. Democrat Ian Baltutis won the open seat.

North Carolina House of Representatives 63rd district general election, 2026
Party	Candidate	Votes	%
Democratic	Ian Baltutis	16,575	50.44%
Republican	Ryan Moffitt	16,289	49.56%
Total votes		32,864	100%
Democratic gain from Republican			

==== District 64 ====
Incumbent Republican Dennis Riddell, who had represented the 64th district since 2013, lost re-election to Democrat LeVon Barnes.

North Carolina House of Representatives 64th district general election, 2026
Party	Candidate	Votes	%
Democratic	LeVon Barnes	18,385	52.82%
Republican	Dennis Riddell (incumbent)	16,422	47.18%
Total votes		34,807	100%
Democratic gain from Republican			

==== District 65 ====
Incumbent Republican Reece Pyrtle has represented the 65th district since 2021. Pyrtle lost the Republican nomination to Seth Woodall, who went on to win the general election.

North Carolina House of Representatives 65th district Republican primary election, 2026
Party	Candidate	Votes	%
Republican	Seth Woodall	7,670	57.52%
Republican	Reece Pyrtle (incumbent)	5,204	39.03%
Republican	Joseph Gibson III	460	3.45%
Total votes		13,334	100%

North Carolina House of Representatives 65th district general election, 2026
Party	Candidate	Votes	%
Republican	Seth Woodall	21,522	63.13%
Democratic	Gavin McGaughey	12,568	36.87%
Total votes		34,090	100%
Republican hold			

==== District 66 ====
Incumbent Democrat Sarah Crawford has represented the 66th district since 2023.

North Carolina House of Representatives 66th district general election, 2026
Party	Candidate	Votes	%
Democratic	Sarah Crawford (incumbent)	29,708	100%
Total votes		29,708	100%
Democratic hold			

==== District 67 ====
Incumbent Republican Cody Huneycutt has represented the 67th district since 2025.

North Carolina House of Representatives 67th district Democratic primary election, 2026
Party	Candidate	Votes	%
Democratic	Jocelyn Torres	1,880	66.48%
Democratic	Roddrick Howell	948	33.52%
Total votes		2,828	100%

North Carolina House of Representatives 67th district general election, 2026
Party	Candidate	Votes	%
Republican	Cody Huneycutt (incumbent)	22,594	67.85%
Democratic	Jocelyn Torres	10,705	32.15%
Total votes		33,299	100%
Republican hold			

==== District 68 ====
Incumbent Republican David Willis has represented the 68th district since 2021.

North Carolina House of Representatives 68th district general election, 2026
Party	Candidate	Votes	%
Republican	David Willis (incumbent)	21,724	53.25%
Democratic	Derek Warriner	19,076	46.75%
Total votes		40,800	100%
Republican hold			

==== District 69 ====
Incumbent Republican Dean Arp has represented the 69th district since 2013.

North Carolina House of Representatives 69th district general election, 2026
Party	Candidate	Votes	%
Republican	Dean Arp (incumbent)	20,645	53.42%
Democratic	Heidi Sinsley	18,000	46.58%
Total votes		38,645	100%
Republican hold			

==== District 70 ====
Incumbent Republican Brian Biggs has represented the 70th district since 2023.

North Carolina House of Representatives 70th district general election, 2026
Party	Candidate	Votes	%
Republican	Brian Biggs (incumbent)	18,991	67.03%
Democratic	William (Bill) McCaskill	9,343	32.97%
Total votes		28,334	100%
Republican hold			

==== District 71 ====
Incumbent Democrat Kanika Brown has represented the 71st district since 2023.

North Carolina House of Representatives 71st district general election, 2026
Party	Candidate	Votes	%
Democratic	Kanika Brown (incumbent)	25,367	88.08%
Green	Mathew Mena	3,432	11.92%
Total votes		28,799	100%
Democratic hold			

==== District 72 ====
Incumbent Democrat Amber Baker has represented the 72nd district since 2021.

North Carolina House of Representatives 72nd district general election, 2026
Party	Candidate	Votes	%
Democratic	Amber Baker (incumbent)	24,901	100%
Total votes		24,901	100%
Democratic hold			

==== District 73 ====
Incumbent Republican Jonathan Almond has represented the 73rd district since 2025. Democratic primary candidate Kim DeLaney passed away on January 26, 2026, before the primary election took place, leaving Thomas Monks as the sole remaining democrat in the race. Almond lost re-election to Monks.

North Carolina House of Representatives 73rd district general election, 2026
Party	Candidate	Votes	%
Democratic	Thomas Monks	17,434	53.86%
Republican	Jonathan Almond (incumbent)	14,935	46.14%
Total votes		32,369	100%
Democratic gain from Republican			

==== District 74 ====
Incumbent Republican Jeff Zenger, who had represented the 74th district since 2021, lost re-election to Democrat Amy Taylor North.

North Carolina House of Representatives 74th district general election, 2026
Party	Candidate	Votes	%
Democratic	Amy Taylor North	23,516	57.06%
Republican	Jeff Zenger (incumbent)	17,695	42.94%
Total votes		41,211	100%
Democratic gain from Republican			

==== District 75 ====
Incumbent Republican Donny Lambeth, who had represented the 75th district since 2013, lost re-election to Democrat Jen Wiles.

North Carolina House of Representatives 75th district general election, 2026
Party	Candidate	Votes	%
Democratic	Jen Wiles	18,637	54.03%
Republican	Donny Lambeth (incumbent)	15,855	45.97%
Total votes		34,492	100%
Democratic gain from Republican			

==== District 76 ====
Incumbent Republican Harry Warren has represented the 76th district and its predecessors since 2011. Warren retired to run for Rowan County Clerk of Superior Court. Republican Greg Edds won the open seat.

North Carolina House of Representatives 76th district general election, 2026
Party	Candidate	Votes	%
Republican	Greg Edds	16,121	53.11%
Democratic	Scott Huffman	14,232	46.89%
Total votes		30,353	100%
Republican hold			

==== District 77 ====
Incumbent Republican Julia Craven Howard has represented the 77th district and its predecessors since 1989.

North Carolina House of Representatives 77th district general election, 2026
Party	Candidate	Votes	%
Republican	Julia Craven Howard (incumbent)	25,505	70.75%
Democratic	Sabrina Harris	10,542	29.25%
Total votes		36,047	100%
Republican hold			

==== District 78 ====
Incumbent Republican Neal Jackson has represented the 78th district since 2023.

North Carolina House of Representatives 78th district Republican primary election, 2026
Party	Candidate	Votes	%
Republican	Neal Jackson (incumbent)	8,450	72.00%
Republican	Mark Dutton	3,286	28.00%
Total votes		11,736	100%

North Carolina House of Representatives 78th district general election, 2026
Party	Candidate	Votes	%
Republican	Neal Jackson (incumbent)	24,618	68.22%
Democratic	Matt Holway	11,468	31.78%
Total votes		36,086	100%
Republican hold			

==== District 79 ====
Incumbent Republican Keith Kidwell, who had represented the 79th district since 2019, lost the Republican nomination Darren Armstrong. Armstrong ran unopposed in the general election.

North Carolina House of Representatives 79th district Republican primary election, 2026
Party	Candidate	Votes	%
Republican	Darren Armstrong	7,447	52.27%
Republican	Keith Kidwell (incumbent)	6,799	47.73%
Total votes		14,246	100%

North Carolina House of Representatives 79th district general election, 2026
Party	Candidate	Votes	%
Republican	Darren Armstrong	26,480	100%
Total votes		26,480	100%
Republican hold			

=== Districts 80-99 ===
==== District 80 ====
Incumbent Republican Sam Watford has represented the 80th district since 2021.

North Carolina House of Representatives 80th district Republican primary election, 2026
Party	Candidate	Votes	%
Republican	Sam Watford (incumbent)	5,415	74.38%
Republican	Joseph Byrne	1,865	25.62%
Total votes		7,280	100%

North Carolina House of Representatives 80th district general election, 2026
Party	Candidate	Votes	%
Republican	Sam Watford (incumbent)	19,762	67.97%
Democratic	JacQuez Johnson	9,312	32.03%
Total votes		29,074	100%
Republican hold			

==== District 81 ====
Incumbent Republican Larry Potts has represented the 81st district since 2017.

North Carolina House of Representatives 81st district Republican primary election, 2026
Party	Candidate	Votes	%
Republican	Larry Potts (incumbent)	6,929	83.12%
Republican	Pamela Zanni	1,407	16.88%
Total votes		8,336	100%

North Carolina House of Representatives 81st district general election, 2026
Party	Candidate	Votes	%
Republican	Larry Potts (incumbent)	20,018	63.32%
Democratic	Dylan Tucker	11,595	36.68%
Total votes		31,613	100%
Republican hold			

==== District 82 ====
Incumbent Republican Brian Echevarria, who had represented the 82nd district since 2025, lost re-election to Democrat Chris Bishopp.

North Carolina House of Representatives 82nd district general election, 2026
Party	Candidate	Votes	%
Democratic	Chris Bishopp	21,045	56.02%
Republican	Brian Echevarria (incumbent)	16,524	43.98%
Total votes		37,569	100%
Democratic gain from Republican			

==== District 83 ====
Incumbent Republican Grant Campbell has represented the 83rd district since 2025.

North Carolina House of Representatives 83rd district general election, 2026
Party	Candidate	Votes	%
Republican	Grant Campbell (incumbent)	18,277	56.26%
Democratic	Johnnie Jones	14,209	43.74%
Total votes		32,486	100%
Republican hold			

==== District 84 ====
Incumbent Republican Jeffrey McNeely has represented the 84th district since 2019.

North Carolina House of Representatives 84th district general election, 2026
Party	Candidate	Votes	%
Republican	Jeffrey McNeely (incumbent)	22,284	100%
Total votes		22,284	100%
Republican hold			

==== District 85 ====
Incumbent Republican Dudley Greene has represented the 85th district since 2021.

North Carolina House of Representatives 85th district general election, 2026
Party	Candidate	Votes	%
Republican	Dudley Greene (incumbent)	23,154	64.98%
Democratic	Suzanne Gavenus	12,476	35.02%
Total votes		35,630	100%
Republican hold			

==== District 86 ====
Incumbent Republican Hugh Blackwell has represented the 86th district since 2009.

North Carolina House of Representatives 86th district general election, 2026
Party	Candidate	Votes	%
Republican	Hugh Blackwell (incumbent)	19,049	63.36%
Democratic	Wesley Hendrix	11,016	36.64%
Total votes		30,065	100%
Republican hold			

==== District 87 ====
Incumbent Republican and House Speaker Destin Hall has represented the 87th district since 2017.

North Carolina House of Representatives 87th district general election, 2026
Party	Candidate	Votes	%
Republican	Destin Hall (incumbent)	19,720	66.64%
Democratic	Iris Bender	9,872	33.36%
Total votes		29,592	100%
Republican hold			

==== District 88 ====
Incumbent Democrat Mary Belk has represented the 88th district since 2017.

North Carolina House of Representatives 88th district general election, 2026
Party	Candidate	Votes	%
Democratic	Mary Belk (incumbent)	23,604	77.98%
Republican	Ray Craig	6,667	22.02%
Total votes		30,271	100%
Democratic hold			

==== District 89 ====
Incumbent Republican Mitchell Setzer has represented the 89th district and its predecessors since 1999.

North Carolina House of Representatives 89th district Republican primary election, 2026
Party	Candidate	Votes	%
Republican	Mitchell Setzer (incumbent)	8,022	86.18%
Republican	Lisa Deaton Koperski	1,286	13.82%
Total votes		9,308	100%

North Carolina House of Representatives 89th district general election, 2026
Party	Candidate	Votes	%
Republican	Mitchell Setzer (incumbent)	23,953	67.51%
Democratic	Robert (Spider) Thompson	11,528	32.49%
Total votes		35,481	100%
Republican hold			

==== District 90 ====
Incumbent Republican Sarah Stevens has represented the 90th district since 2009. Stevens retired to run for the North Carolina Supreme Court and later resigned her seat early. Republican nominee Dan Kiger was appointed to finish the remainder of Stevens' term. Republican Dan Kiger was appointed to finish the remainder of Stevens' term.

North Carolina House of Representatives 90th district Republican primary election, 2026
Party	Candidate	Votes	%
Republican	Dan Kiger	7,459	51.91%
Republican	Paul Barker	5,156	35.89%
Republican	A.J. Daoud	1,753	12.20%
Total votes		14,368	100%

North Carolina House of Representatives 90th district general election, 2026
Party	Candidate	Votes	%
Republican	Dan Kiger (incumbent)	21,221	70.78%
Democratic	Ken Badgett	8,759	29.22%
Total votes		29,980	100%
Republican hold			

==== District 91 ====
Incumbent Republican Kyle Hall has represented the 91st district since 2015.

North Carolina House of Representatives 91st district general election, 2026
Party	Candidate	Votes	%
Republican	Kyle Hall (incumbent)	18,473	59.06%
Democratic	Lucille Puckett	12,806	40.94%
Total votes		31,279	100%
Republican hold			

==== District 92 ====
Incumbent Democrat Terry Brown has represented the 92nd district since 2021.

North Carolina House of Representatives 92nd district general election, 2026
Party	Candidate	Votes	%
Democratic	Terry Brown (incumbent)	29,678	100%
Total votes		29,678	100%
Democratic hold			

==== District 93 ====
Incumbent Republican Ray Pickett, who had represented the 93rd district since 2021, lost re-election to Democrat Charlie Wallin.

North Carolina House of Representatives 93rd district general election, 2026
Party	Candidate	Votes	%
Democratic	Charlie Wallin	19,070	50.45%
Republican	Ray Pickett (incumbent)	18,729	49.55%
Total votes		37,799	100%
Democratic gain from Republican			

==== District 94 ====
Incumbent Republican Blair Eddins has represented the 94th district since 2024.

North Carolina House of Representatives 94th district general election, 2026
Party	Candidate	Votes	%
Republican	Blair Eddins (incumbent)	22,490	72.56%
Democratic	Andy Warren	8,505	27.44%
Total votes		30,995	100%
Republican hold			

==== District 95 ====
Incumbent Republican Todd Carver has represented the 95th district since 2025.

North Carolina House of Representatives 95th district Republican primary election, 2026
Party	Candidate	Votes	%
Republican	Todd Carver (incumbent)	3,181	59.49%
Republican	Mike Kubiniec	2,166	40.51%
Total votes		5,347	100%

North Carolina House of Representatives 95th district general election, 2026
Party	Candidate	Votes	%
Republican	Todd Carver (incumbent)	20,015	55.86%
Democratic	Michael Robinson	15,816	44.14%
Total votes		35,831	100%
Republican hold			

==== District 96 ====
Incumbent Republican Jay Adams has represented the 96th district since 2015.

North Carolina House of Representatives 96th district general election, 2026
Party	Candidate	Votes	%
Republican	Jay Adams (incumbent)	17,309	54.58%
Democratic	Park Inglefield	14,403	45.42%
Total votes		31,712	100%
Republican hold			

==== District 97 ====
Incumbent Republican Heather Rhyne has represented the 97th district since 2024.

North Carolina House of Representatives 97th district general election, 2026
Party	Candidate	Votes	%
Republican	Heather Rhyne (incumbent)	25,557	67.01%
Democratic	Greg McBryde	12,584	32.99%
Total votes		38,141	100%
Republican hold			

==== District 98 ====
Incumbent Democrat Beth Helfrich has represented the 98th district since 2025.

North Carolina House of Representatives 98th district general election, 2026
Party	Candidate	Votes	%
Democratic	Beth Helfrich (incumbent)	23,498	60.08%
Republican	John Rhodes	15,612	39.92%
Total votes		39,110	100%
Democratic hold			

==== District 99 ====
Incumbent Democrat turned Independent Nasif Majeed had represented the 99th district since 2019. Majeed lost the Democratic nomination to Veleria Levy. Levy ran unopposed in the general election.

North Carolina House of Representatives 99th district Democratic primary election, 2026
Party	Candidate	Votes	%
Democratic	Veleria Levy	4,966	68.56%
Democratic	Nasif Majeed (incumbent)	1,896	26.18%
Democratic	Tucker Neal	381	5.26%
Total votes		7,243	100%

North Carolina House of Representatives 99th district general election, 2026
Party	Candidate	Votes	%
Democratic	Veleria Levy	24,127	100%
Total votes		24,127	100%
Democratic gain from Independent			

=== Districts 100-120 ===
==== District 100 ====
Incumbent Democrat Julia Greenfield has represented the 100th district since 2025.

North Carolina House of Representatives 100th district general election, 2026
Party	Candidate	Votes	%
Democratic	Julia Greenfield (incumbent)	22,461	100%
Total votes		22,461	100%
Democratic hold			

==== District 101 ====
Incumbent Democrat Carolyn Logan has represented the 101st district since 2019.

North Carolina House of Representatives 101st district general election, 2026
Party	Candidate	Votes	%
Democratic	Carolyn Logan (incumbent)	27,115	100%
Total votes		27,115	100%
Democratic hold			

==== District 102 ====
Incumbent Democrat Becky Carney has represented the 102nd district since 2003.

North Carolina House of Representatives 102nd district general election, 2026
Party	Candidate	Votes	%
Democratic	Becky Carney (incumbent)	32,017	100%
Total votes		32,017	100%
Democratic hold			

==== District 103 ====
Incumbent Democrat Laura Budd has represented the 103rd district since 2023.

North Carolina House of Representatives 103rd district general election, 2026
Party	Candidate	Votes	%
Democratic	Laura Budd (incumbent)	25,698	100%
Total votes		25,698	100%
Democratic hold			

==== District 104 ====
Incumbent Democrat Brandon Lofton has represented the 104th district since 2019.

North Carolina House of Representatives 104th district general election, 2026
Party	Candidate	Votes	%
Democratic	Brandon Lofton (incumbent)	24,956	64.99%
Republican	Trina Boyd	13,446	35.01%
Total votes		38,402	100%
Democratic hold			

==== District 105 ====
Incumbent Republican Tricia Cotham, who had represented the 105th district and its predecessors since 2023, lost re-election to Democrat Ken McCool.

North Carolina House of Representatives 105th district Republican primary election, 2026
Party	Candidate	Votes	%
Republican	Tricia Cotham (incumbent)	4,372	84.53%
Republican	Kelly VanHorn	800	15.47%
Total votes		5,172	100%

North Carolina House of Representatives 105th district general election, 2026
Party	Candidate	Votes	%
Democratic	Ken McCool	24,647	57.12%
Republican	Tricia Cotham (incumbent)	18,505	42.88%
Total votes		43,152	100%
Democratic gain from Republican			

==== District 106 ====
Incumbent Democrat turned Independent Carla Cunningham had represented the 106th district since 2013. Cunningham lost the Democratic nomination to Rodney Sadler. Sadler ran unopposed in the general election.

North Carolina House of Representatives 106th district Democratic primary election, 2026
Party	Candidate	Votes	%
Democratic	Rodney Sadler	7,727	69.95%
Democratic	Carla Cunningham (incumbent)	2,404	21.76%
Democratic	Vermanno Bowman	916	8.29%
Total votes		11,047	100%

North Carolina House of Representatives 106th district general election, 2026
Party	Candidate	Votes	%
Democratic	Rodney Sadler	33,346	100%
Total votes		33,346	100%
Democratic gain from Independent			

==== District 107 ====
Incumbent Democrat Aisha Dew has represented the 107th district since 2025.

North Carolina House of Representatives 107th district general election, 2026
Party	Candidate	Votes	%
Democratic	Aisha Dew (incumbent)	29,815	100%
Total votes		29,815	100%
Democratic hold			

==== District 108 ====
Incumbent Republican John Torbett has represented the 108th district since 2011.

North Carolina House of Representatives 108th district general election, 2026
Party	Candidate	Votes	%
Republican	John Torbett (incumbent)	16,868	54.02%
Democratic	Sydnie Hutchinson	14,357	45.98%
Total votes		31,225	100%
Republican hold			

==== District 109 ====
Incumbent Republican Donnie Loftis, who had represented the 109th district since 2021, lost re-election to Democrat Mark Carver.

North Carolina House of Representatives 109th district general election, 2026
Party	Candidate	Votes	%
Democratic	Mark Carver	18,843	51.68%
Republican	Donnie Loftis (incumbent)	17,619	48.32%
Total votes		36,462	100%
Democratic gain from Republican			

==== District 110 ====
Incumbent Republican Kelly Hastings had represented the 110th district since 2011. Hastings lost the Republican nomination to Caroline Eason, who went on to win the general election.

North Carolina House of Representatives 110th district Republican primary election, 2026
Party	Candidate	Votes	%
Republican	Caroline Eason	3,584	53.63%
Republican	Kelly Hastings (incumbent)	3,099	46.37%
Total votes		6,683	100%

North Carolina House of Representatives 110th district general election, 2026
Party	Candidate	Votes	%
Republican	Caroline Eason	16,757	57.97%
Democratic	Mary Silver	12,148	42.03%
Total votes		28,905	100%
Republican hold			

==== District 111 ====
Incumbent Republican Paul Scott has represented the 111th district since 2025.

North Carolina House of Representatives 111th district general election, 2026
Party	Candidate	Votes	%
Republican	Paul Scott (incumbent)	18,686	65.95%
Democratic	Jerry Blake	9,647	34.05%
Total votes		28,333	100%
Republican hold			

==== District 112 ====
Incumbent Democrat Jordan Lopez has represented the 112th district since 2025.

North Carolina House of Representatives 112th district general election, 2026
Party	Candidate	Votes	%
Democratic	Jordan Lopez (incumbent)	26,430	100%
Total votes		26,430	100%
Democratic hold			

==== District 113 ====
Incumbent Republican Jake Johnson has represented the 113th district since 2019.

North Carolina House of Representatives 113th district Republican primary election, 2026
Party	Candidate	Votes	%
Republican	Jake Johnson (incumbent)	7,341	61.04%
Republican	Mike Hager	4,685	38.96%
Total votes		12,026	100%

North Carolina House of Representatives 113th district general election, 2026
Party	Candidate	Votes	%
Republican	Jake Johnson (incumbent)	23,153	58.56%
Democratic	John Morgan	16,385	41.44%
Total votes		39,538	100%
Republican hold			

==== District 114 ====
Incumbent Democrat Eric Ager has represented the 114th district since 2023.

North Carolina House of Representatives 114th district general election, 2026
Party	Candidate	Votes	%
Democratic	Eric Ager (incumbent)	32,914	100%
Total votes		32,914	100%
Democratic hold			

==== District 115 ====
Incumbent Democrat Lindsey Prather has represented the 115th district since 2023.

North Carolina House of Representatives 115th district general election, 2026
Party	Candidate	Votes	%
Democratic	Lindsey Prather (incumbent)	24,475	60.00%
Republican	Anthony Penland	16,317	40.00%
Total votes		40,792	100%
Democratic hold			

==== District 116 ====
Incumbent Democrat Brian Turner has represented the 116th district since 2025.

North Carolina House of Representatives 116th district general election, 2026
Party	Candidate	Votes	%
Democratic	Brian Turner (incumbent)	38,886	100%
Total votes		38,886	100%
Democratic hold			

==== District 117 ====
Incumbent Republican Jennifer Balkcom has represented the 117th district since 2023. When Balkcom launched her 2026 campaign for North Carolina’s 11th Congressional District, Chelsea Walsh, chairwoman of the Henderson County GOP was chosen as the replacement nominee. Democrat Lynne Russo defeated Walsh in the general election.

North Carolina House of Representatives 117th district Republican primary election, 2026
Party	Candidate	Votes	%
Republican	Jennifer Balkcom (incumbent)	5,974	76.17%
Republican	Christopher Lamar Wilson	1,869	23.83%
Total votes		7,843	100%

North Carolina House of Representatives 117th district general election, 2026
Party	Candidate	Votes	%
Democratic	Lynne Russo	22,717	51.72%
Republican	Chelsea Walsh	21,203	48.28%
Total votes		43,920	100%
Democratic gain from Republican			

==== District 118 ====
Incumbent Republican Mark Pless had represented the 118th district since 2021. Pless lost the Republican nomination to Jimmy Rogers, who went on to win the general election.

North Carolina House of Representatives 118th district Republican primary election, 2026
Party	Candidate	Votes	%
Republican	Jimmy Rogers	4,965	54.71%
Republican	Mark Pless (incumbent)	4,110	45.29%
Total votes		9,075	100%

North Carolina House of Representatives 118th district general election, 2026
Party	Candidate	Votes	%
Republican	Jimmy Rogers	19,559	50.80%
Democratic	Danny Davis	18,943	49.20%
Total votes		38,502	100%
Republican hold			

==== District 119 ====
Incumbent Republican Mike Clampitt represented the 119th district from 2021 until his death on March 18, 2026. Republican Anna Ferguson was appointed to finish Clampitt's term. Ferguson ran for re-election for a full term, but she lost to Democrat Mark Burrows.

North Carolina House of Representatives 119th district Republican primary election, 2026
Party	Candidate	Votes	%
Republican	Mike Clampitt (incumbent)	4,508	56.72%
Republican	Anna Ferguson	2,988	37.59%
Republican	Mike Yow	452	5.69%
Total votes		7,948	100%

North Carolina House of Representatives 119th district general election, 2026
Party	Candidate	Votes	%
Democratic	Mark Burrows	19,617	52.42%
Republican	Anna Ferguson (incumbent)	17,806	47.58%
Total votes		37,423	100%
Democratic gain from Republican			

==== District 120 ====
Incumbent Republican Karl Gillespie has represented the 120th district since 2021.

North Carolina House of Representatives 120th district general election, 2026
Party	Candidate	Votes	%
Republican	Karl Gillespie (incumbent)	25,669	67.84%
Democratic	Caleb Brown	12,167	32.16%
Total votes		37,836	100%
Republican hold			

== See also ==
- 2026 North Carolina elections
- 2026 North Carolina Senate election
- List of North Carolina state legislatures
