= Amy Taylor North =

American politician

Member-elect of the North Carolina House of Representatives from the 74th district
- Assuming office January 1, 2027
- Succeeding: Jeff Zenger

Personal details
- Born: 1971 or 1972 (age 54–55) Texas, U.S.
- Party: Democratic
- Education: Texas Tech University (BA)
- Occupation: Small business owner

Military service
- Allegiance: United States
- Branch/service: United States Army

Amy Taylor North (born 1971 or 1972) is an American small business owner and politician who is a member-elect of the North Carolina House of Representatives from the 74th district. A Democrat, she defeated Republican incumbent Jeff Zenger in the 2026 election.

== Early life and career ==
North was born in Texas and earned a bachelor's degree from Texas Tech University in 1994. She is a small business owner and an Army veteran.

== Political career ==
North first ran for the 74th district in 2024, in a western Forsyth County seat that was not considered a likely Democratic pickup, and lost to Zenger by 3.6 percentage points. The 2026 rematch was forecast as the most competitive of the seven legislative races involving Forsyth County. North defeated Zenger with 23,443 votes (57.07 percent) to 17,638 (42.93 percent).

== Electoral history ==
=== 2026 ===
North Carolina House of Representatives 74th district general election, 2026
Party	Candidate	Votes	%
Democratic	Amy Taylor North	23,443	57.07%
Republican	Jeff Zenger (incumbent)	17,638	42.93%
Total votes		41,081	100%
Democratic gain from Republican			

=== 2024 ===
North Carolina House of Representatives 74th district Democratic primary election, 2024
Party	Candidate	Votes	%
Democratic	Amy Taylor North	4,954	79.74%
Democratic	Mack Wilder	1,259	20.26%
Total votes		6,213	100%

North Carolina House of Representatives 74th district general election, 2024
Party	Candidate	Votes	%
Republican	Jeff Zenger (incumbent)	26,908	51.82%
Democratic	Amy Taylor North	25,015	48.18%
Total votes		51,923	100%
Republican hold			

North Carolina House of Representatives
Preceded by Jeff Zenger	Member-elect of the North Carolina House of Representatives from the 74th district Taking office January 1, 2027	Succeeded by TBD
