= Jen Wiles =

American politician

Member-elect of the North Carolina House of Representatives from the 75th district
- Assuming office January 1, 2027
- Succeeding: Donny Lambeth

Personal details
- Party: Democratic
- Children: 2
- Occupation: Healthcare clinician

Jen Wiles is an American healthcare clinician and politician who is a member-elect of the North Carolina House of Representatives from the 75th district. A Democrat, she defeated Republican incumbent Donny Lambeth in the 2026 election.

== Career ==
Wiles is a resident of Winston-Salem. She is a healthcare clinician and mother of two, and has volunteered in public schools and with people experiencing homelessness.

== Political career ==
Wiles entered the race for the 75th district, which includes eastern Forsyth County, to keep the seat from going uncontested. Her platform included affordable health care, universal pre-K, and raising the minimum wage. She defeated Lambeth by 2,721 votes, or about 7.9 percentage points, in a district he had won by 13.9 points in 2024.

== Electoral history ==
=== 2026 ===
North Carolina House of Representatives 75th district general election, 2026
Party	Candidate	Votes	%
Democratic	Jen Wiles	18,503	53.97%
Republican	Donny Lambeth (incumbent)	15,782	46.03%
Total votes		34,285	100%
Democratic gain from Republican			

North Carolina House of Representatives
Preceded by Donny Lambeth	Member-elect of the North Carolina House of Representatives from the 75th district Taking office January 1, 2027	Succeeded by TBD
