= L'Bertice Solomon =

American politician

L'Bertrice Solomon

Member-elect of the North Carolina House of Representatives from the 26th district
- Assuming office January 1, 2027
- Succeeding: Donna McDowell White

Personal details
- Party: Democratic
- Occupation: Public health official, minister
- Website: Campaign website

L'Bertrice Solomon is an American public health professional, minister, and politician who is a member-elect of the North Carolina House of Representatives from the 26th district. A Democrat, she defeated longtime Republican incumbent Donna McDowell White in the 2026 election.

== Career ==
Solomon is a resident of Clayton and is chief public health officer for a community health organization. Her background includes work in hospital settings and community health outreach, and she is also a minister.

== Political career ==
Solomon entered the race for the 26th district in December 2025, centering her campaign on health care access, equity, and education. She defeated White with 21,655 votes (52.99 percent), a margin of 2,443 votes.

== Electoral history ==
=== 2026 ===
North Carolina House of Representatives 26th district general election, 2026
Party	Candidate	Votes	%
Democratic	L'Bertrice Solomon	21,655	52.99%
Republican	Donna McDowell White (incumbent)	19,212	47.01%
Total votes		40,867	100%
Democratic gain from Republican			

North Carolina House of Representatives
Preceded by Donna McDowell White	Member-elect of the North Carolina House of Representatives from the 26th district Taking office January 1, 2027	Succeeded by TBD
