= Patricia Smith (North Carolina politician) =

American politician from North Carolina

Member-elect of the North Carolina House of Representatives from the 23rd district
- Assuming office TBD
- Succeeding: Shelly Willingham

Personal details
- Party: Democratic

Patricia Smith is an American accountant and politician who is a member-elect to the North Carolina House of Representatives from the 23rd district. A Democrat, she defeated incumbent Shelly Willingham in the Democratic primary election in 2026.

== Political career ==
Smith ran for mayor of Williamston, North Carolina, in 2023. She placed third, behind winner Dean McCall and runner-up Jason Paul Steward respectively.

Smith defeated incumbent Democratic representative Shelly Willingham in the primary election in 2026.

== Electoral history ==
=== 2026 ===
North Carolina House of Representatives 23rd district Democratic primary election, 2026
Party	Candidate	Votes	%
Democratic	Patricia Smith	5,231	55.70%
Democratic	Shelly Willingham (incumbent)	4,161	44.30%
Total votes		9,392	100%

North Carolina House of Representatives 23rd district general election, 2026
Party	Candidate	Votes	%
Democratic	Patricia Smith		
Republican	Brent Roberson		
Total votes			100%

=== 2023 ===
Williamston mayor election, 2023
Candidate	Votes	%
Dean McCall	497	
Jason Paul Steward	217	
Patricia Smith	148	
Alonzo Brown	129	
Write-in	3	
Total votes	994	100.00
