= Lynne Russo =

American politician

Member-elect of the North Carolina House of Representatives from the 117th district
- Assuming office January 1, 2027
- Succeeding: Jennifer Balkcom

Personal details
- Born: 1970 or 1971 (age 55–56) Minnesota, U.S.
- Party: Democratic
- Education: University of Minnesota
- Occupation: Communications consultant
- Website: Campaign Website

Lynne Russo (born 1970 or 1971) is an American communications consultant and politician who is a member-elect of the North Carolina House of Representatives from the 117th district. A Democrat, she defeated Republican Chelsea Walsh in the 2026 election, flipping a Republican-held seat in Henderson County.

== Career ==
A native of Minnesota, Russo graduated from the University of Minnesota and has owned a communications consulting business for 23 years, working with nonprofit and education organizations. During her career she has worked with the Milken Foundation and other education and medical nonprofits. She lives in Hendersonville and was there when Hurricane Helene struck. After the storm she started a group to raise relief funds for victims.

== Political career ==
Russo launched her campaign for the 117th district in August 2025, citing dissatisfaction with the General Assembly's support for Helene relief. She initially challenged Republican incumbent Jennifer Balkcom. Balkcom later left the race to run for Congress, and Republicans chose Walsh as their replacement nominee. Russo won by 1,530 votes, with 22,710 votes (51.74 percent) to Walsh's 21,180 (48.26 percent).

== Electoral history ==
=== 2026 ===
North Carolina House of Representatives 117th district general election, 2026
Party	Candidate	Votes	%
Democratic	Lynne Russo	22,710	51.74%
Republican	Chelsea Walsh	21,180	48.26%
Total votes		43,890	100%
Democratic gain from Republican			

North Carolina House of Representatives
Preceded by Jennifer Balkcom	Member-elect of the North Carolina House of Representatives from the 117th district Taking office January 1, 2027	Succeeded by TBD
