= Mark Burrows (politician) =

American politician

Member-elect of the North Carolina House of Representatives from the 119th district
- Assuming office January 1, 2027
- Succeeding: Anna Ferguson

Personal details
- Party: Democratic
- Education: Wake Forest University (BA); Duke University
- Occupation: Economic development official

Mark Burrows is an American local government official and politician who is a member-elect of the North Carolina House of Representatives from the 119th district. A Democrat, he defeated Republican incumbent Anna Ferguson in the 2026 election.

== Career ==
Burrows earned a bachelor's degree from Wake Forest University in 1985 and a graduate degree from Duke University in 1987, and as of 2024 was a member of the American Institute of Certified Planners. A resident of Brevard, he worked as a planner in Transylvania County and has spent more than 31 years in local government.

== Political career ==
Burrows ran for the 119th district in 2024, losing to Republican Mike Clampitt with 44.6 percent of the vote to 55.4 percent. Ferguson was appointed to the seat in April 2026 after Clampitt's death. In the 2026 race, Burrows campaigned on fiscal transparency, healthy communities, conservation, and public school funding, and opposed a proposed constitutional amendment on local property tax rates. He won with 19,523 votes (52.41 percent) to Ferguson's 17,726 (47.59 percent), in a district that voted for Trump by 12.5 points in 2024.

== Electoral history ==
=== 2026 ===
North Carolina House of Representatives 119th district general election, 2026
Party	Candidate	Votes	%
Democratic	Mark Burrows	19,523	52.41%
Republican	Anna Ferguson (incumbent)	17,726	47.59%
Total votes		37,249	100%
Democratic gain from Republican			

=== 2024 ===
North Carolina House of Representatives 119th district general election, 2024
Party	Candidate	Votes	%
Republican	Mike Clampitt (incumbent)	26,871	55.39%
Democratic	Mark Burrows	21,641	44.61%
Total votes		48,512	100%
Republican hold			

North Carolina House of Representatives
Preceded by Anna Ferguson	Member-elect of the North Carolina House of Representatives from the 119th district Taking office January 1, 2027	Succeeded by TBD
