= Elma Hairston =

American politician

Member-elect of the North Carolina House of Representatives from the 59th district
- Assuming office January 1, 2027
- Succeeding: Alan Branson

Personal details
- Party: Democratic
- Occupation: Motivational speaker, author

Elma Hairston is an American motivational speaker, author, and politician who is a member-elect of the North Carolina House of Representatives from the 59th district. A Democrat, she defeated Republican incumbent Alan Branson in the 2026 election.

== Career ==
Hairston is a motivational speaker and author and a former president of the High Point chapter of the NAACP.

== Political career ==
Hairston was the Democratic candidate for the 59th district, which covers eastern and southern Guilford County, in 2026. The seat had been drawn to favor Republicans, and Branson had won it with 54 percent of the vote in 2024. Affordability was a focus of her campaign. She defeated Branson with 22,405 votes to his 20,812.

== Electoral history ==
=== 2026 ===
North Carolina House of Representatives 59th district Democratic primary election, 2026
Party	Candidate	Votes	%
Democratic	Elma Hairston	4,649	59.26%
Democratic	C. Bradley Hunt II	3,196	40.74%
Total votes		7,845	100%

North Carolina House of Representatives 59th district general election, 2026
Party	Candidate	Votes	%
Democratic	Elma Hairston	22,405	51.84%
Republican	Alan Branson (incumbent)	20,812	48.16%
Total votes		43,217	100%
Democratic gain from Republican			

North Carolina House of Representatives
Preceded by Alan Branson	Member-elect of the North Carolina House of Representatives from the 59th district Taking office January 1, 2027	Succeeded by TBD
