= LeVon Barnes =

American politician

Member-elect of the North Carolina House of Representatives from the 64th district
- Assuming office January 1, 2027
- Succeeding: Dennis Riddell

Personal details
- Born: November 13, 1982 (age 43) Staten Island, New York, U.S.
- Party: Democratic
- Spouse: Kelly Newsome
- Children: 1
- Education: Campbell University (BS); Prairie View A&M University (MEd)
- Occupation: Educator

LeVon Barnes (born November 13, 1982) is an American educator and politician who is a member-elect of the North Carolina House of Representatives from the 64th district. A Democrat, he defeated Republican incumbent Dennis Riddell in the 2026 election.

== Early life and career ==
Barnes was born in Staten Island, New York. He graduated from Curtis High School in 2000, earned a bachelor's degree in physical education from Campbell University in 2004, and earned a master's degree in health education from Prairie View A&M University in 2008. He works for Durham Public Schools and is a member of Alpha Phi Alpha and the North Carolina Association of Educators. He has worked as an educator for 24 years.

== Political career ==
Barnes has served as chair of the Democratic Party's 9th Congressional District in North Carolina since 2024. He first ran for the 64th House district that year. His 2026 priorities included restoring some powers of the governor limited by the General Assembly and raising the state's minimum wage. Barnes and fellow Democrat Ian Baltutis won both Alamance County House districts, giving their party both seats for the first time in at least 24 years. Barnes won with 52.73 percent of the vote.

== Electoral history ==
=== 2026 ===
North Carolina House of Representatives 64th district general election, 2026
Party	Candidate	Votes	%
Democratic	LeVon Barnes	18,261	52.73%
Republican	Dennis Riddell (incumbent)	16,373	47.27%
Total votes		34,634	100%
Democratic gain from Republican			

=== 2024 ===
North Carolina House of Representatives 64th district general election, 2024
Party	Candidate	Votes	%
Republican	Dennis Riddell (incumbent)	24,541	54.84%
Democratic	LeVon Barnes	20,212	45.16%
Total votes		44,753	100%
Republican hold			

North Carolina House of Representatives
Preceded by Dennis Riddell	Member-elect of the North Carolina House of Representatives from the 64th district Taking office January 1, 2027	Succeeded by TBD
