= Veleria Levy =

American politician from North Carolina

Member-elect of the North Carolina House of Representatives from the 99th district
- Assuming office TBD
- Succeeding: Nasif Majeed

Personal details
- Born: 1968 or 1969 (age 57–58)
- Party: Democratic
- Education: North Carolina A&T State University (BS); Wake Forest University School of Law (MLS)

Veleria M. Levy (born 1968 or 1969) is an American healthcare policy consultant and politician who is a member-elect to the North Carolina House of Representatives from the 99th district. A Democrat, she defeated incumbent Nasif Majeed in the Democratic primary election in 2026. She founded healthcare consulting firm HerHealth Consulting, LLC and serves as its president and CEO.

== Early life and career ==
Levy is the daughter of a U.S. Military veteran. She earned a Bachelor of Science degree in public relations and political science from North Carolina A&T State University and later earned a Master of Legal Studies in health care law and healthcare policy from Wake Forest University School of Law.

Levy currently works as president and CEO of HerHealth Consulting, which she founded. She previously served as executive director of the North Carolina AIDS Action Network. She previously worked as an account executive for Med Express and Avita Pharmacy in Salisbury, North Carolina.

=== Political involvement ===
Levy was a delegate to the 2012 Democratic National Convention. She was elected second vice chair of the North Carolina Democratic Party in 2015 and served in the role until 2017.

In 2016, Levy ran for one of two at-large seats on the Rowan County board of commissioners. Despite raising the most of all candidates with $10,140, she placed third behind incumbent Republican commissioners Craig Pierce and Mike Caskey.

Levy defeated incumbent Democratic representative Nasif Majeed in the primary election in 2026. Following his loss, Majeed left the party and began caucusing as an independent.

== Electoral history ==
=== 2026 ===
North Carolina House of Representatives 99th district Democratic primary election, 2026
Party	Candidate	Votes	%
Democratic	Veleria Levy	4,949	68.60%
Democratic	Nasif Majeed (incumbent)	1,889	26.19%
Democratic	Tucker Neal	376	5.21%
Total votes		7,214	100%

=== 2016 ===
Rowan County Board of Commissioners At-large general election, 2016
Party	Candidate	Votes	%
Republican	Mike Caskey (incumbent)	38,666	37.93%
Republican	Craig Pierce (incumbent)	31,318	30.72%
Democratic	Veleria M. Levy	20,275	19.89%
Libertarian	Mark Alan Lyerly	11,684	11.46%
Total votes		101,943	100%
Republican hold			
Republican hold			
