= Thomas Monks =

American politician

Member-elect of the North Carolina House of Representatives from the 73rd district
- Assuming office January 1, 2027
- Succeeding: Jonathan Almond

Personal details
- Born: Florida, U.S.
- Party: Democratic
- Education: Florida Gulf Coast University (BA)
- Occupation: Marketing coordinator

Thomas J. Monks is an American marketing professional and politician who is a member-elect of the North Carolina House of Representatives from the 73rd district. A Democrat, he defeated Republican incumbent Jonathan Almond in the 2026 election.

== Early life and career ==
Monks was born in Florida and raised in North Carolina, graduating from Sun Valley High School near Indian Trail. He studied communications in Florida and settled in Concord in 2015. He holds a bachelor's degree from Florida Gulf Coast University and is a marketing coordinator at UNC Charlotte.

== Political career ==
Monks became the sole Democratic nominee for the 73rd district after primary candidate Kim DeLaney died in January 2026. His top issues included public school funding, election integrity and voter access, disaster preparedness, and affordability. He defeated Almond with 53.80 percent of the vote.

== Electoral history ==
=== 2026 ===
North Carolina House of Representatives 73rd district general election, 2026
Party	Candidate	Votes	%
Democratic	Thomas Monks	17,333	53.80%
Republican	Jonathan Almond (incumbent)	14,884	46.20%
Total votes		32,217	100%
Democratic gain from Republican			

North Carolina House of Representatives
Preceded by Jonathan Almond	Member-elect of the North Carolina House of Representatives from the 73rd district Taking office January 1, 2027	Succeeded by TBD
