= Sam Davis III =

American politician

Member-elect of the North Carolina House of Representatives from the 5th district
- Assuming office January 1, 2027
- Succeeding: Bill Ward

Personal details
- Born: 1951 or 1952 (age 73–74) Elizabeth City, North Carolina, U.S.
- Party: Democratic
- Occupation: Real estate broker

Sam Davis III (born 1951 or 1952) is an American real estate broker and politician who is a member-elect of the North Carolina House of Representatives from the 5th district. A Democrat, he defeated two-term Republican incumbent Bill Ward in the 2026 election.

== Early life and career ==
Davis is a native of Elizabeth City, where he grew up around his father's hardware store and later raised his family. He owns a real estate brokerage. In his 20s he served as president of the local Jaycees.

== Political career ==
Davis has served on the Pasquotank County Board of Commissioners on and off for many years, and has served as a district director for the county commissioners' association. At the time of his 2026 campaign he held an at-large seat on the board.

In December 2025, Davis filed as the only Democratic candidate for the 5th district, which includes Camden, Gates, Hertford, and Pasquotank counties. He defeated Ward by 1,697 votes. A delay in reporting Pasquotank County's early votes had left Ward ahead until those ballots were counted. Davis is expected to give up his commissioner seat before joining the House, with the board appointing a replacement.

== Electoral history ==
=== 2026 ===
North Carolina House of Representatives 5th district general election, 2026
Party	Candidate	Votes	%
Democratic	Sam Davis III	16,082	52.78%
Republican	Bill Ward (incumbent)	14,385	47.22%
Total votes		30,467	100%
Democratic gain from Republican			

North Carolina House of Representatives
Preceded by Bill Ward	Member-elect of the North Carolina House of Representatives from the 5th district Taking office January 1, 2027	Succeeded by TBD
