= Winn Decker =

American politician

Member-elect of the North Carolina House of Representatives from the 37th district
- Assuming office January 1, 2027
- Succeeding: Erin Paré

Personal details
- Born: 1992 or 1993 (age 33–34)
- Party: Democratic
- Education: North Carolina State University (PhD)
- Occupation: Education policy strategist

Winn Decker (born 1992 or 1993) is an American education policy strategist and politician who is a member-elect of the North Carolina House of Representatives from the 37th district. A Democrat, he defeated Republican incumbent Erin Paré in the 2026 election.

== Career ==
Decker lives in Fuquay-Varina. He holds a Ph.D. in public administration from North Carolina State University and works for the Common App, the nonprofit college application platform.

== Political career ==
In his first run for office, Decker won the three-way Democratic primary for the 37th district in March 2026 with just over 50 percent of the vote, defeating law professor Marcus Gadson and information technology consultant Ralph Clements. His campaign focused on education and affordability. He defeated Paré in the general election with 54.72 percent of the vote.

== Electoral history ==
=== 2026 ===
North Carolina House of Representatives 37th district Democratic primary election, 2026
Party	Candidate	Votes	%
Democratic	Winn Decker	4,720	50.34%
Democratic	Marcus Gadson	3,568	38.05%
Democratic	Ralph Clements	1,088	11.60%
Total votes		9,376	100%

North Carolina House of Representatives 37th district general election, 2026
Party	Candidate	Votes	%
Democratic	Winn Decker	26,678	54.72%
Republican	Erin Pare	22,074	45.28%
Total votes		48,752	100%
Democratic gain from Republican			

North Carolina House of Representatives
Preceded by Erin Paré	Member-elect of the North Carolina House of Representatives from the 37th district Taking office January 1, 2027	Succeeded by TBD
