= Mark Carver =

American politician

Member-elect of the North Carolina House of Representatives from the 109th district
- Assuming office January 1, 2027
- Succeeding: Donnie Loftis

Personal details
- Born: 1957 or 1958 (age 68–69) Fayetteville, North Carolina, U.S.
- Party: Democratic
- Education: Methodist College (BS); North Carolina State University (MA)
- Occupation: History instructor

Mark D. Carver (born 1957 or 1958) is an American college instructor, former union leader, and politician who is a member-elect of the North Carolina House of Representatives from the 109th district. A Democrat, he defeated Republican incumbent Donnie Loftis in the 2026 election.

== Early life and career ==
Carver is a native of Fayetteville. He holds a bachelor's degree from Methodist College and a master's degree from North Carolina State University, and works as a history instructor. He spent 25 years at a subsidiary of Goodyear Tire and Rubber, where he was a union leader, and was elected a division chairman of a United Steelworkers local.

== Political career ==
In the race for the 109th district in Gaston County, Carver campaigned on the cost of living, lower taxes, and better pay for educators. He defeated Loftis with 51.62 percent of the vote to 48.38 percent.

== Electoral history ==
=== 2026 ===
North Carolina House of Representatives 109th district general election, 2026
Party	Candidate	Votes	%
Democratic	Mark Carver	18,775	51.62%
Republican	Donnie Loftis (incumbent)	17,598	48.38%
Total votes		36,373	100%
Democratic gain from Republican			

North Carolina House of Representatives
Preceded by Donnie Loftis	Member-elect of the North Carolina House of Representatives from the 109th district Taking office January 1, 2027	Succeeded by TBD
