= Rodney Sadler =

American politician

Member-elect of the North Carolina House of Representatives from the 106th district
- Assuming office January 2027
- Succeeding: Carla Cunningham

Personal details
- Born: 1967 (age 58–59)
- Party: Democratic
- Children: 1

Academic background
- Education: Howard University (BS, MDiv); Duke University (PhD)
- Thesis: Can a Cushite change his skin? An examination of race, ethnicity, and othering in the Hebrew Bible (2001)
- Doctoral advisor: Eric M. Meyers

Academic work
- Discipline: Biblical studies
- Institutions: Union Presbyterian Seminary

Rodney Sadler (born 1967) is an American priest, Biblical scholar, and politician. He became a professor at Union Presbyterian Seminary's Charlotte campus, as well as an ordained Baptist minister, and he wrote Can a Cushite Change His Skin? (2005) and co-authored The Genesis of Liberation (2016). He is active as an activist and community leader, and was part of the Moral Monday movement in 2013. He is the member-elect of the North Carolina House of Representatives from the 106th district, following his defeat of Carla Cunningham in the Democratic primary.

== Biography ==
=== Early life and education ===
Sadler was born in 1967. He was born to teenage parents who both married different people, and was raised by grandparents in Philadelphia. He was raised in a Baptist household in Philadelphia and attended Moorestown Friends School.

Sadler obtained a BS in Psychology and Philosophy from Howard University in 1989, and after a summer study at Hebrew University of Jerusalem in 1990, a Master of Divinity from Howard University School of Divinity in 1992 and a PhD in Hebrew Bible and Biblical Archaeology from Duke University in 2001. His doctoral dissertation Can a Cushite change his skin? An examination of race, ethnicity, and othering in the Hebrew Bible was supervised by Eric M. Meyers.

=== Academic and religious career ===
In 2002, Sadler started teaching at Union Presbyterian Seminary after they opened their Charlotte campus. He eventually became an associate professor at UPS, as well as director of their Center for Social Justice and Reconciliation.

Sadler's research is on the intersection between race and religion or politics. He wrote Can A Cushite Change His Skin: An Examination of Race, Ethnicity, and Othering in the Hebrew Bible (2005), following up on learning that the Old Testament referenced the Cushites' dark skin without racist language. and, alongside Emerson Powery, co-authored The Genesis of Liberation: Biblical Interpretation in the Antebellum Narratives of the Enslaved. He cites Cain Hope Felder and Gene Rice as inspirations.

Sadler has served as an ordained Baptist minister, including in interim capacities as a Charlotte pastor in Mount Carmel Baptist Church and Sardis Baptist Church. On being called to ministry during his youth, he told The Charlotte Observer: "I didn't want to, I felt led to. I wanted to be a rock-and-roll star. I was going to be the next Prince".

=== Political career ===
In May 2013, Sadler joined the Moral Monday movement at the General Assembly, where he was later arrested alongside hundreds of protesters over the next few months. He advocated on behalf of North Carolina NAACP to pressure the state government into expanding Medicaid. He credited a high school teacher who told him that "if you are not actively opposing an unjust law, you are passively accepting it" with his activism. He has also served on the North Carolina NAACP executive committee member and as co-chair of the Charlotte-Mecklenburg Schools Clergy Advisory Council and president of the Mecklenburg Metropolitan Interfaith Network board.

Sadler ran as a Democratic candidate for North Carolina's 106th House district in the 2026 North Carolina House of Representatives election, challenging incumbent Carla Cunningham. Cunningham had attracted Democratic backlash due to her views on Immigration and Customs Enforcement, including overriding a governor veto on the Criminal Illegal Alien Enforcement Act (the only Democrat to do so) and her subsequent floor speech stating that "all cultures are not equal" (which drew accusations of racism), and the challenge was known as a response to ICE's deployment by the second Trump administration. He was endorsed by Governor Josh Stein over Cunningham.

Sadler won the primary election in April, defeating Cunningham 69.9% to 21.8%. There were no Republican candidates for the district, and he won the general election unopposed in November.

=== Personal life ===
Sadler has a daughter with his wife Madeline McClenney-Sadler. A member of Mount Carmel Baptist Church, he "likes to quip that 'I'm not a Presbyterian but I play one on TV'". He was diagnosed with diabetes at age 20.

== Works ==
- Can a Cushite Change His Skin?: An Examination of Race, Ethnicity, and Othering in the Hebrew Bible (2005) (Note: Reviews of this book:)
- (with Emerson B. Powery) The Genesis of Liberation: Biblical Interpretation in the Antebellum Narratives of the Enslaved (2016) (Note: Reviews of this book:)
