= Janene Ackles =

American politician

Member-elect of the North Carolina House of Representatives from the 43rd district
- Assuming office January 1, 2027
- Succeeding: Diane Wheatley

Personal details
- Born: 1969 or 1970 (age 55–56)
- Party: Democratic
- Occupation: Nonprofit consultant, grant writer

Janene Ackles (born 1969 or 1970) is an American nonprofit consultant and politician who is a member-elect of the North Carolina House of Representatives from the 43rd district. A Democrat, she defeated Republican incumbent Diane Wheatley in the 2026 election.

== Career ==
Ackles is a nonprofit consultant and grant writer.

== Political career ==
Ackles first challenged Wheatley for the 43rd district seat in 2024, losing with 42.67 percent of the vote to Wheatley's 57.33 percent. Her 2026 campaign called for reforming the Opportunity Scholarship voucher program with income limits and more accountability for private schools receiving public money, and argued that rural and unincorporated parts of Cumberland County were left out of decisions affecting them.

Ackles defeated Wheatley with 15,814 votes (52.12 percent) to 14,530 (47.88 percent).

== Electoral history ==
=== 2026 ===
North Carolina House of Representatives 43rd district Democratic primary election, 2026
Party	Candidate	Votes	%
Democratic	Janene Ackles	3,913	67.03%
Democratic	Ronald Pittman	1,925	32.97%
Total votes		5,838	100%

North Carolina House of Representatives 43rd district general election, 2026
Party	Candidate	Votes	%
Democratic	Janene Ackles	15,814	52.12%
Republican	Diane Wheatley (incumbent)	14,530	47.88%
Total votes		30,344	100%
Democratic gain from Republican			

=== 2024 ===
North Carolina House of Representatives 43rd district general election, 2024
Party	Candidate	Votes	%
Republican	Diane Wheatley (incumbent)	24,753	57.33%
Democratic	Janene (Dublin) Ackles	18,422	42.67%
Total votes		43,175	100%
Republican hold			

North Carolina House of Representatives
Preceded by Diane Wheatley	Member-elect of the North Carolina House of Representatives from the 43rd district Taking office January 1, 2027	Succeeded by TBD
