= Ken McCool =

American politician from North Carolina

Member-elect of the North Carolina House of Representatives from the 105th district
- Assuming office January 1, 2027
- Succeeding: Tricia Cotham

Member of the Matthews Board of Commissioners
- In office February 24, 2020 – December 8, 2025
- Preceded by: Barbara Dement
- Succeeded by: Susan Chambers; Kerry Lamson; Jonathan Clayton; Jennefer Cross Garrity; Brian Hacker

Personal details
- Born: Kenneth John McCool; May 17, 1998 (age 28)
- Party: Democratic
- Occupation: Business owner

Kenneth John McCool (born May 17, 1998) is an American business owner and politician who is a member-elect of the North Carolina House of Representatives from the 105th district. A Democrat, he defeated Republican incumbent Tricia Cotham in the 2026 election.

== Career ==
McCool runs a father-and-son sports cards and collectibles store in Indian Trail.

== Political career ==
McCool was elected to the Matthews Board of Commissioners at age 21, and served three terms from 2020 to 2025, including a period as mayor pro tem. His interest in politics began with a presentation Cotham gave to his high school journalism class.

In the 2026 race for the 105th district, McCool focused on affordability, public schools, and bringing balance to the General Assembly, and was endorsed by the local Fraternal Order of Police lodge. Cotham had switched parties in 2023 and narrowly won reelection in 2024. McCool won with 57.12 percent of the vote; at 28, he will be among the youngest members of the North Carolina General Assembly.

== Electoral history ==
=== 2026 ===
North Carolina House of Representatives 105th district general election, 2026
Party	Candidate	Votes	%
Democratic	Ken McCool	24,647	57.12%
Republican	Tricia Cotham (incumbent)	18,505	42.88%
Total votes		43,152	100%
Democratic gain from Republican			

=== 2025 ===
Matthews Board of Commissioners election, 2025
Party	Candidate	Votes	%
Nonpartisan	Susan Chambers	4,681	13.13%
Nonpartisan	John Urban (incumbent)	4,253	11.93%
Nonpartisan	Kerry Lamson	3,924	11.01%
Nonpartisan	Jonathan Clayton	3,834	10.75%
Nonpartisan	Jennefer Cross Garrity	3,810	10.69%
Nonpartisan	Brian Hacker	3,778	10.60%
Nonpartisan	Gina Hoover (incumbent)	3,337	9.36%
Nonpartisan	Mark Tofano (incumbent)	3,199	8.97%
Nonpartisan	Jim Dedmon	2,315	6.49%
Nonpartisan	George Young	2,286	6.41%
Write-in		233	0.65%
Nonpartisan	Ken McCool (incumbent) (write-in)	5	0.01%
Total votes		35,655	100%

=== 2023 ===
Matthews Board of Commissioners election, 2023
Party	Candidate	Votes	%
Nonpartisan	Gina Hoover (incumbent)	2,429	10.39%
Nonpartisan	Mark Tofano (incumbent)	2,394	10.24%
Nonpartisan	Renee Garner (incumbent)	2,336	9.99%
Nonpartisan	Ken McCool (incumbent)	2,246	9.61%
Nonpartisan	Leon Threatt	2,110	9.02%
Nonpartisan	John Urban (incumbent)	2,051	8.77%
Nonpartisan	Jonathan Clayton	1,909	8.16%
Nonpartisan	Jeff Miller	1,767	7.56%
Nonpartisan	David Gaertner	1,714	7.33%
Nonpartisan	David Wieser	1,535	6.57%
Nonpartisan	George Young	1,519	6.50%
Nonpartisan	Sebastian Sadovsky	1,260	5.39%
Write-in		111	0.47%
Total votes		23,381	100%

=== 2021 ===
Matthews Board of Commissioners election, 2021
Party	Candidate	Votes	%
Nonpartisan	Ken McCool (incumbent)	1,670	14.79%
Nonpartisan	Renee Garner (incumbent)	1,650	14.62%
Nonpartisan	Larry Whitley (incumbent)	1,604	14.21%
Nonpartisan	John Urban (incumbent)	1,530	13.55%
Nonpartisan	Mark Tofano	1,435	12.71%
Nonpartisan	Gina Hoover	1,287	11.40%
Nonpartisan	Danielle Burnham	1,283	11.37%
Nonpartisan	Heather Spicer Laws	665	5.89%
Write-in		161	1.43%
Nonpartisan	Brandon Taylor (write-in)	4	0.04%
Total votes		11,289	100%

=== 2019 ===
Matthews Board of Commissioners election, 2019
Party	Candidate	Votes	%
Nonpartisan	Renee Garner	2,459	9.94%
Nonpartisan	Jeff Miller (incumbent)	2,428	9.82%
Nonpartisan	Barbara Dement (incumbent)	2,367	9.57%
Nonpartisan	Dave Bland	2,342	9.47%
Nonpartisan	Larry Whitley	2,342	9.47%
Nonpartisan	John Urban (incumbent)	2,303	9.31%
Nonpartisan	Ken McCool	2,290	9.26%
Nonpartisan	Mark Tofano	2,254	9.11%
Nonpartisan	Gina Hoover	1,990	8.05%
Nonpartisan	Ben Bash	1,983	8.02%
Nonpartisan	Allen Crosby	1,923	7.78%
Write-in		49	0.20%
Total votes		24,730	100%

North Carolina House of Representatives
Preceded by Tricia Cotham	Member-elect of the North Carolina House of Representatives from the 105th district Taking office January 1, 2027	Succeeded by TBD
