= Shelly Headen =

American politician

Member of the North Carolina House of Representatives from the 62nd district
- Member-elect
- Assumed office January 2027
- Preceded by: John Blust

Personal details
- Party: Democratic
- Education: Appalachian State University
- Website: Campaign website

Shelly Headen is an American politician. A member of the Democratic Party, she was elected to the North Carolina House of Representatives in 2026, representing the 62nd district. Headen unseated Republican John Blust in the 2026 election.

Headen graduated from Mountain Heritage High School in Burnsville, North Carolina, before earning her bachelor's degree from Appalachian State University in 1991.
