= Chris Bishopp =

American politician

Member-elect of the North Carolina House of Representatives from the 82nd district
- Assuming office January 1, 2027
- Succeeding: Brian Echevarria

Personal details
- Born: 1960 or 1961 (age 65–66)
- Party: Democratic
- Education: University of North Carolina at Chapel Hill
- Occupation: Air traffic controller (retired)
- Website: Campaign website

Military service
- Allegiance: United States
- Branch/service: United States Navy

Chris Bishopp (born 1960 or 1961) is an American retired air traffic controller, United States Navy veteran, and politician who is a member-elect of the North Carolina House of Representatives from the 82nd district. A Democrat, he defeated Republican incumbent Brian Echevarria in the 2026 election.

== Early life and career ==
Bishopp studied political science at the University of North Carolina at Chapel Hill on a Navy ROTC scholarship and served as an active-duty naval flight officer for seven years. He then worked as an air traffic controller for the Federal Aviation Administration for more than three decades, and was the legislative representative for the Greensboro tower.

== Political career ==
Bishopp ran for the 82nd district in Cabarrus County, citing school funding cuts, low teacher pay, restricted health care access, and gerrymandering. He called for revamping or repealing the Opportunity Scholarship program and for a moratorium on new for-profit charter schools. He defeated Echevarria with 55.98 percent of the vote.

== Electoral history ==
=== 2026 ===
North Carolina House of Representatives 82nd district general election, 2026
Party	Candidate	Votes	%
Democratic	Chris Bishopp	20,956	55.98%
Republican	Brian Echevarria (incumbent)	16,481	44.02%
Total votes		37,437	100%
Democratic gain from Republican			

North Carolina House of Representatives
Preceded by Brian Echevarria	Member-elect of the North Carolina House of Representatives from the 82nd district Taking office January 1, 2027	Succeeded by TBD
