= Wellie Jackson =

American politician

Member-elect of the North Carolina House of Representatives from the 22nd district
- Assuming office January 1, 2027
- Succeeding: William Brisson

Personal details
- Party: Republican
- Occupation: Farmer

Wellie Jackson is an American farmer and politician who is a member-elect of the North Carolina House of Representatives from the 22nd district. A Republican, he won the seat held by retiring Republican William Brisson without opposition in the 2026 election.

== Career ==
Jackson is a contract turkey grower and farmer for Butterball, and he grew the turkeys pardoned by President Donald Trump at the White House in 2019. He has also served for more than 20 years as a volunteer firefighter in Keener.

== Political career ==
Jackson defeated Jerol Kivett in the March 2026 Republican primary for the 22nd district. The Democratic nominee, Jimmy Melvin, withdrew, leaving Jackson as the only candidate on the general election ballot; he received 19,106 votes.

== Electoral history ==
=== 2026 ===
North Carolina House of Representatives 22nd district Republican primary election, 2026
Party	Candidate	Votes	%
Republican	Wellie Jackson	7,155	77.23%
Republican	Jerol Kivett	2,109	22.77%
Total votes		9,264	100%

North Carolina House of Representatives 22nd district general election, 2026
Party	Candidate	Votes	%
Republican	Wellie Jackson	19,106	100.00%
Total votes		19,106	100%
Republican hold			

North Carolina House of Representatives
Preceded by William Brisson	Member-elect of the North Carolina House of Representatives from the 22nd district Taking office January 1, 2027	Succeeded by TBD
