= Lorenza Wilkins =

American politician

Member-elect of the North Carolina House of Representatives from the 25th district
- Assuming office January 1, 2027
- Succeeding: Allen Chesser

Personal details
- Born: 1972 or 1973 (age 53–54) Lake Gaston, North Carolina, U.S.
- Party: Democratic
- Children: 4
- Education: Columbia Southern University (MBA, DBA)
- Occupation: Nonprofit executive
- Website: Campaign website

Lorenza M. Wilkins (born 1972 or 1973) is an American nonprofit executive and politician who is a member-elect of the North Carolina House of Representatives from the 25th district. A Democrat, he defeated Republican incumbent Allen Chesser in the 2026 election.

== Early life and career ==
Wilkins is a native of Lake Gaston, North Carolina, and has lived in Nash County for more than 27 years. He is the son of a Vietnam War veteran and a retired public school teacher, and formerly worked in the railroad industry. He holds master's and doctoral degrees in business administration from Columbia Southern University.

He has worked as an executive at a food-focused nonprofit, and has held other nonprofit roles and a position at CSX. He is married and has four children.

== Political career ==
In his first run for office, Wilkins narrowly lost the 25th district race to Chesser in 2024 in a three-way contest, finishing 461 votes behind. He ran again in 2026, facing Harris Walker in the Democratic primary. He defeated Chesser in the general election with 52.67 percent of the vote.

== Electoral history ==
=== 2026 ===
North Carolina House of Representatives 25th district Democratic primary election, 2026
Party	Candidate	Votes	%
Democratic	Lorenza Wilkins	4,964	57.07%
Democratic	Harris Walker	3,734	42.93%
Total votes		8,698	100%

North Carolina House of Representatives 25th district general election, 2026
Party	Candidate	Votes	%
Democratic	Lorenza Wilkins	20,420	52.67%
Republican	Allen Chesser (incumbent)	17,340	44.73%
Libertarian	Nick Taylor	1,010	2.61%
Total votes		38,770	100%
Democratic gain from Republican			

=== 2024 ===
North Carolina House of Representatives 25th district general election, 2024
Party	Candidate	Votes	%
Republican	Allen Chesser (incumbent)	23,868	48.80%
Democratic	Lorenza Wilkins	23,407	47.86%
Libertarian	Nick Taylor	1,630	3.33%
Total votes		48,905	100%
Republican hold			

North Carolina House of Representatives
Preceded by Allen Chesser	Member-elect of the North Carolina House of Representatives from the 25th district Taking office January 1, 2027	Succeeded by TBD
