= Seth Woodall =

American politician

Member-elect of the North Carolina House of Representatives from the 65th district
- Assuming office January 1, 2027
- Succeeding: Reece Pyrtle

Personal details
- Born: Eden, North Carolina, U.S.
- Party: Republican
- Spouse: Stephanie Woodall
- Children: 4
- Education: University of North Carolina at Greensboro; Regent University School of Law
- Occupation: Attorney, business owner
- Website: Campaign website

Seth Woodall is an American attorney and politician who is a member-elect of the North Carolina House of Representatives from the 65th district. A Republican, he defeated incumbent Reece Pyrtle in the 2026 Republican primary.

== Early life and career ==
Woodall was born in Winston Salem and raised in Eden. He attended Rockingham Community College, the University of North Carolina at Greensboro, and Regent University School of Law before returning to Eden to build his legal practice and other businesses. He and his wife, Stephanie, have four children.

== Political career ==
Woodall ran in the 2024 Republican primary for lieutenant governor, finishing with about 11 percent of the vote. In March 2026, he defeated Pyrtle in the Republican primary for the 65th House district. He defeated Democrat Gavin McGaughey in the general election with 63.22 percent of the vote.

== Electoral history ==
=== 2026 ===
North Carolina House of Representatives 65th district Republican primary election, 2026
Party	Candidate	Votes	%
Republican	Seth Woodall	7,670	57.52%
Republican	Reece Pyrtle (incumbent)	5,204	39.03%
Republican	Joseph Gibson III	460	3.45%
Total votes		13,334	100%

North Carolina House of Representatives 65th district general election, 2026
Party	Candidate	Votes	%
Republican	Seth Woodall	21,413	63.22%
Democratic	Gavin McGaughey	12,456	36.78%
Total votes		33,869	100%
Republican hold			

=== 2024 ===
North Carolina lieutenant governor Republican primary election, 2024
Party	Candidate	Votes	%
Republican	Hal Weatherman	181,818	19.59%
Republican	Jim O'Neill	147,042	15.84%
Republican	Deanna Ballard	138,822	14.96%
Republican	Seth Woodall	102,492	11.04%
Republican	Sam Page	94,810	10.22%
Republican	Allen Mashburn	83,550	9.00%
Republican	Jeffrey Elmore	79,883	8.61%
Republican	Peter Boykin	32,126	3.46%
Republican	Rivera Douthit	23,398	2.52%
Republican	Ernest T. Reeves	22,760	2.45%
Republican	Marlenis Hernandez Novoa	21,404	2.31%
Total votes		928,105	100.0%

North Carolina House of Representatives
Preceded by Reece Pyrtle	Member-elect of the North Carolina House of Representatives from the 65th district Taking office January 1, 2027	Succeeded by TBD
