= Charlie Wallin =

American politician

Member-elect of the North Carolina House of Representatives from the 93rd district
- Assuming office January 2027
- Succeeding: Ray Pickett

Personal details
- Party: Democratic

Charlie Wallin is an American politician. A member of the Democratic Party, he is the member-elect for the 93rd district of the North Carolina House of Representatives.
