= Clancy Baucom =

American politician

Member-elect of the North Carolina House of Representatives from the 55th district
- Assuming office January 1, 2027
- Succeeding: Mark Brody

Personal details
- Born: Union County, North Carolina, U.S.
- Party: Republican
- Spouse: Kim Baucom
- Children: 3
- Education: North Carolina State University (AS)
- Occupation: Nursery owner
- Website: Campaign website

Clancy Baucom is an American nursery owner and politician who is a member-elect of the North Carolina House of Representatives from the 55th district. A Republican, he has served on the Union County Board of Commissioners since 2024.

== Early life and career ==
A lifelong Union County resident, Baucom graduated from Piedmont High School and earned an associate degree from North Carolina State University. He owns a 200-acre wholesale nursery in Marshville. He and his wife, Kim, have three adult daughters.

== Political career ==
Baucom was appointed to the Union County Board of Commissioners on March 18, 2024, and is serving the remainder of the term of his late cousin through December 2026.

In August 2025, Baucom announced his campaign for the 55th district seat held by retiring Republican Mark Brody, with the endorsement of the entire county commission. Agriculture was among his top priorities. He ran against John Powell and Richard Miller in the Republican primary. He defeated Democrat John Kirkpatrick IV in the general election with 55.81 percent of the vote.

== Electoral history ==
=== 2026 ===
North Carolina House of Representatives 55th district Republican primary election, 2026
Party	Candidate	Votes	%
Republican	Clancy Baucom	4,516	79.19%
Republican	John Powell	792	13.89%
Republican	Richard Miller	395	6.93%
Total votes		5,703	100%

North Carolina House of Representatives 55th district general election, 2026
Party	Candidate	Votes	%
Republican	Clancy Baucom	15,907	55.81%
Democratic	John J. Kirkpatrick IV	12,594	44.19%
Total votes		28,501	100%
Republican hold			

North Carolina House of Representatives
Preceded by Mark Brody	Member-elect of the North Carolina House of Representatives from the 55th district Taking office January 1, 2027	Succeeded by TBD
