= Nasif Majeed =

American politician

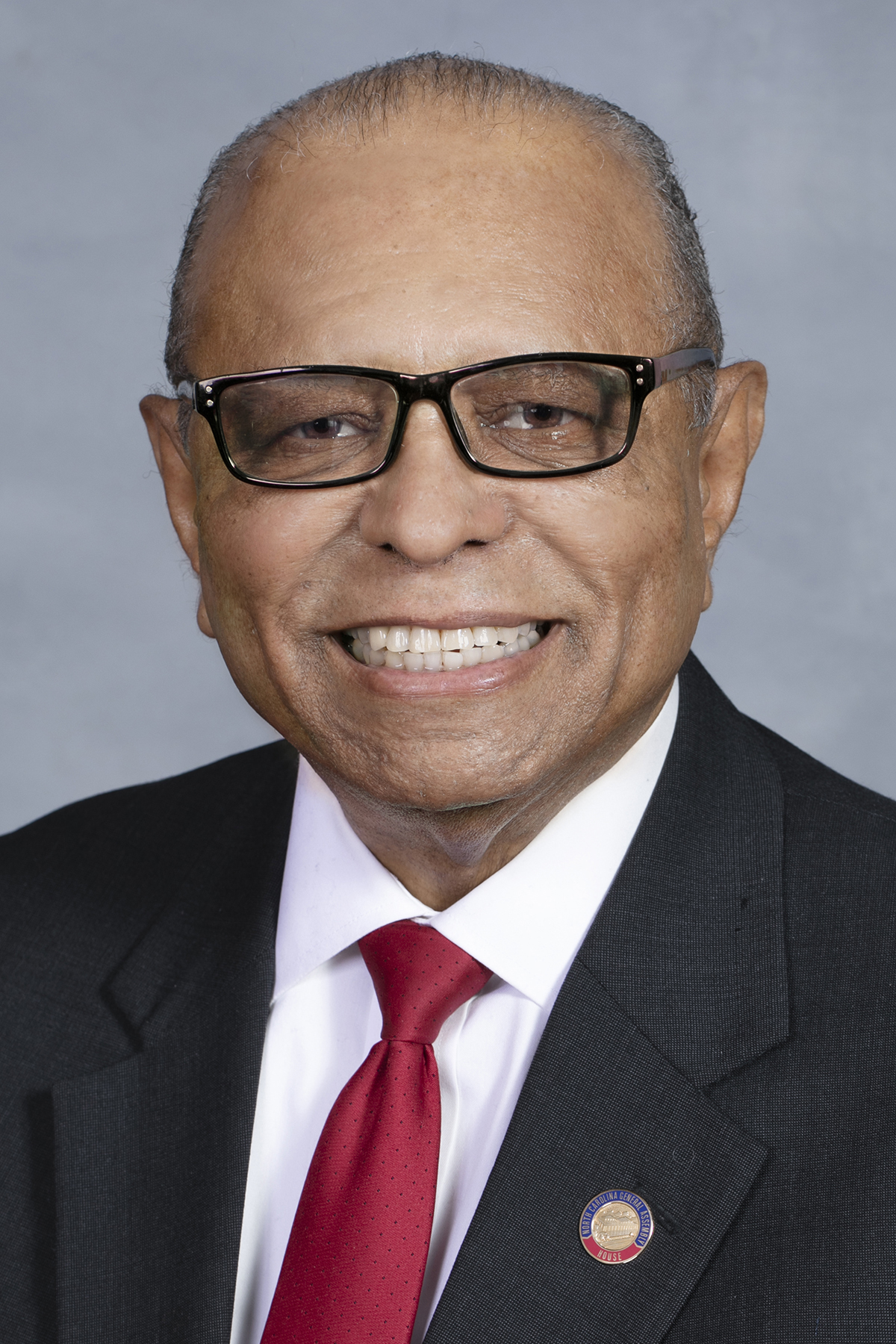
- Official portrait, 2019

Member of the North Carolina House of Representatives from the 99th district
- Incumbent
- Assumed office January 1, 2019
- Preceded by: Rodney Moore

Member of the Charlotte City Council from the 4th district
- In office December 2, 1991 – December 6, 1999
- Succeeded by: Malcolm Graham

Personal details
- Born: Nasif Rashad Majeed; September 27, 1945 (age 80) Raleigh, North Carolina, U.S.
- Party: Democratic (before 2026); Independent (2026–present)
- Education: University of Florida (AA); North Carolina A&T State University (BS, MS)

Military service
- Branch/service: United States Air Force
- Battles/wars: Vietnam War

Nasif Rashad Majeed (born September 27, 1945) is an unaffiliated (formerly Democratic) member of the North Carolina House of Representatives. He has represented the 99th district since 2019. He ran for re-election in 2026, but lost in the Democratic primary to Veleria Levy and disaffiliated from the party the following month.

== Career ==
Majeed is a graduate of North Carolina A&T State University, earning a BS in Business Administration and a Masters in Agricultural Education.

He flew combat missions as a B-52 pilot over North Vietnam during the Vietnam War. Majeed is a decorated United States Air Force combat pilot. He is the recipient of the North Carolina Department of Military and Veterans Affairs, African American Veterans Lineage Medal of Distinction. He was a Captain and Aircraft Commander of a B-52 Strategic Bomber, flying over 120 combat missions over North Vietnam.

He later was a pilot with Piedmont Airlines, now American Airlines. In 1975, Majeed served as the Director of Aviation for the World Community of Islam in the West under the leadership of Imam Warith Deen Mohammed in Chicago, Illinois. As President of the West Charlotte Merchants Association and the Plaza Eastway Partners Coalition of Neighborhoods, he spearheaded the creation of two major community based building projects in Charlotte. The West Charlotfe Business Incubator and the $40 million dollar Eastway Regional Recreation Center.

Majeed owned and operated a Burger King franchise in Charlotte. He is the former Chairman of the nonprofit political organization the American Coalition for Good Government. Majeed served fourteen years as a Clinical Chaplain for the North Carolina Department of Corrections and is an Associate Imam at Masjid Ash-Shaheed in Charlotte.

Majeed served as a member of the Charlotte City Council from 1991 to 1999.

In 2016, Majeed challenged incumbent Joyce Waddell for the 40th district of the North Carolina Senate.

== North Carolina House of Representatives ==
In 2018, Majeed won the general election for a seat in the North Carolina House of Representatives. He secured eighty-two percent of the vote while his closest rival, Republican Joshua Niday, secured eighteen percent.

=== Tenure ===
In July 2025, Majeed voted with Republicans to override Governor Josh Stein’s veto of House Bill 805, titled "Prevent Sexual Exploitation/Women and Minors." The override passed the North Carolina House by a vote of 72–48 and the Senate by 30–19, with Majeed being the only Democrat to support the override in the House.

The legislation, which initially passed unanimously before being amended in the Senate, includes provisions restricting the use of state funds for gender-affirming medical care for incarcerated individuals, allowing parents to exempt students from certain classroom materials on religious grounds, and requiring school districts to create searchable databases of library holdings. The bill also includes language defining sex-based terms in state law and permitting individuals who received gender transition procedures to pursue legal action within a ten-year window.

Majeed stated that his decision to support the override was driven by personal moral considerations, saying he “had some moral issues” and felt compelled to vote accordingly. His vote drew criticism from Democratic colleagues, including Senate Democratic Leader Sydney Batch, who warned that supporting the measure could alienate constituents. Advocacy groups and Democratic lawmakers argued that the bill disproportionately affected LGBTQ+ individuals and students, while supporters described it as necessary to protect parental rights and clarify sex-based distinctions in law.

The vote prompted protests at the General Assembly and public debate across the state. Supporters, including representatives of conservative advocacy organizations, praised the bill as safeguarding children and parental authority, while opponents characterized it as part of a broader pattern of legislation targeting LGBTQ+ communities and public education.

== Personal life ==
Majeed is Muslim.

== Electoral history ==
=== 2026 ===
North Carolina House of Representatives 99th district Democratic primary election, 2026
Party	Candidate	Votes	%
Democratic	Veleria Levy	4,966	68.56%
Democratic	Nasif Majeed (incumbent)	1,896	26.18%
Democratic	Tucker Neal	381	5.26%
Total votes		7,243	100%

=== 2024 ===
North Carolina House of Representatives 99th district general election, 2020
Party	Candidate	Votes	%
Democratic	Nasif Majeed (incumbent)	27,772	86.40%
Libertarian	Rob Yates	4,373	13.60%
Total votes		32,145	100%
Democratic hold			

=== 2020 ===
North Carolina House of Representatives 99th district general election, 2020
Party	Candidate	Votes	%
Democratic	Nasif Majeed (incumbent)	28,226	64.57%
Republican	Russell Rowe	15,486	35.43%
Total votes		43,712	100%
Democratic hold			

=== 2018 ===
North Carolina House of Representatives 99th district Democratic primary election, 2018
Party	Candidate	Votes	%
Democratic	Nasif Majeed	3,010	57.27%
Democratic	Priscilla "PJ" Johnson	1,187	22.58%
Democratic	Rodney Moore (incumbent)	879	16.72%
Democratic	Jackson Pethal	180	3.42%
Total votes		5,256	100%

North Carolina House of Representatives 99th district general election, 2018
Party	Candidate	Votes	%
Democratic	Nasif Majeed	21,915	82.35%
Republican	Joshua Niday	4,696	17.65%
Total votes		26,611	100%
Democratic hold			
