= Ian Baltutis =

American politician from North Carolina

Member-elect of the North Carolina House of Representatives from the 63rd district
- Assuming office January 1, 2027
- Succeeding: Stephen Ross

Member of the Burlington City Council
- Incumbent
- Assumed office December 2, 2025
- Preceded by: Harold Owen; Ronnie Wall

Mayor of Burlington
- In office December 1, 2015 – December 7, 2021
- Preceded by: Ronnie Wall
- Succeeded by: Jim Butler

Personal details
- Party: Democratic
- Education: Elon University; University of North Carolina at Chapel Hill

Ian Baltutis is an American politician. A member of the Democratic Party, he is the member-elect for the 63rd district of the North Carolina House of Representatives. He previously served as mayor of Burlington, North Carolina from 2015 to 2021. He was elected to the North Carolina House of Representatives in the 2026 elections.

== Electoral history ==
=== 2026 ===
North Carolina House of Representatives 63rd district general election, 2026
Party	Candidate	Votes	%
Democratic	Ian Baltutis	16,575	50.44%
Republican	Ryan Moffitt	16,289	49.56%
Total votes		32,864	100%
Democratic gain from Republican			

=== 2025 ===
Burlington City Council election, 2025
Party	Candidate	Votes	%
Nonpartisan	Ian Baltutis	3,956	27.78%
Nonpartisan	Jeffrey Smythe	3,619	25.41%
Nonpartisan	Donna Vanhook	3,322	23.33%
Nonpartisan	Harold Owen (incumbent)	3,310	23.24%
Write-in		35	0.25%
Total votes		14,242	100%

=== 2021 ===
Burlington mayoral election, 2021
Party	Candidate	Votes	%
Nonpartisan	Jim Butler	4,463	57.71%
Nonpartisan	Ian Baltutis (incumbent)	3,246	41.97%
Write-in		25	0.32%
Total votes		7,734	100%

=== 2019 ===
Burlington mayoral election, 2019
Party	Candidate	Votes	%
Nonpartisan	Ian Baltutis (incumbent)	2,359	66.53%
Nonpartisan	Joey Cook Sr.	1,175	33.14%
Write-in		12	0.34%
Total votes		3,546	100%

=== 2017 ===
Burlington mayoral election, 2017
Party	Candidate	Votes	%
Nonpartisan	Ian Baltutis (incumbent)	2,739	55.33%
Nonpartisan	Celo Faucette	2,192	44.28%
Write-in		19	0.38%
Total votes		4,950	100%

=== 2015 ===
Burlington mayoral election, 2015
Party	Candidate	Votes	%
Nonpartisan	Ian Baltutis	2,148	54.95%
Nonpartisan	Jim Butler	1,748	44.72%
Write-in		13	0.33%
Total votes		3,909	100%

=== 2014 ===
North Carolina House of Representatives 63rd district general election, 2014
Party	Candidate	Votes	%
Republican	Stephen Ross (incumbent)	13,041	57.01%
Democratic	Ian Baltutis	9,834	42.99%
Total votes		22,875	100%
Republican hold			

=== 2013 ===
Burlington mayoral election, 2013
Party	Candidate	Votes	%
Nonpartisan	Ronnie Wall (incumbent)	2,604	64.63%
Nonpartisan	Ian Baltutis	1,414	35.10%
Write-in		11	0.27%
Total votes		4,029	100%

North Carolina House of Representatives
Preceded by Stephen Ross	Member of the North Carolina House of Representatives from the 63rd district Assuming Office 2027	Succeeded by TBD
