= Caroline Eason =

American politician

Caroline Eason Rhoten

Member-elect of the North Carolina House of Representatives from the 110th district
- Assuming office January 1, 2027
- Succeeding: Kelly Hastings

Personal details
- Born: 2000 or 2001 (age 25–26)
- Party: Republican
- Education: University of North Carolina at Chapel Hill (PharmD)
- Occupation: Pharmacist

Caroline Eason Rhoten (born 2000 or 2001) is an American pharmacist and politician who is a member-elect of the North Carolina House of Representatives from the 110th district. A Republican, she defeated eight-term incumbent Kelly Hastings in the 2026 Republican primary.

== Early life and career ==
Eason grew up in Lawndale. She is a graduate of the UNC Eshelman School of Pharmacy and a third-generation independent community pharmacist. She works at her family's independent pharmacy chain. She is a Baptist.

== Political career ==
In her first run for office, Eason defeated Hastings in the March 2026 Republican primary for the 110th district, a result WSOC-TV described as one of the biggest upsets of the primary. She defeated Democrat Mary Silver in the general election with 58.03 percent of the vote.

== Electoral history ==
=== 2026 ===
North Carolina House of Representatives 110th district Republican primary election, 2026
Party	Candidate	Votes	%
Republican	Caroline Eason	3,584	53.63%
Republican	Kelly Hastings (incumbent)	3,099	46.37%
Total votes		6,683	100%

North Carolina House of Representatives 110th district general election, 2026
Party	Candidate	Votes	%
Republican	Caroline Eason	16,704	58.03%
Democratic	Mary Silver	12,081	41.97%
Total votes		28,785	100%
Republican hold			

North Carolina House of Representatives
Preceded by Kelly Hastings	Member-elect of the North Carolina House of Representatives from the 110th district Taking office January 1, 2027	Succeeded by TBD
