= Jimmy Rogers (politician) =

American politician

Member-elect of the North Carolina House of Representatives from the 118th district
- Assuming office January 1, 2027
- Succeeding: Mark Pless

Personal details
- Born: Haywood County, North Carolina, U.S.
- Party: Republican
- Education: Appalachian State University
- Occupation: Business owner

James M. (Jimmy) Rogers is an American business owner and politician who is a member-elect of the North Carolina House of Representatives from the 118th district. A Republican, he defeated three-term incumbent Mark Pless in the 2026 Republican primary.

== Early life and career ==
A Haywood County native, Rogers graduated from Pisgah High School and Appalachian State University, and has spent more than 40 years running his family's tractor business.

== Political career ==
Rogers has served on the Haywood County school board since 2000. In the March 2026 Republican primary for the 118th district, he defeated Pless by 855 votes. He campaigned on a promise not to micromanage municipalities through local bills. He defeated Democrat Danny Davis, a former judge, in the general election with 50.79 percent of the vote.

== Electoral history ==
=== 2026 ===
North Carolina House of Representatives 118th district Republican primary election, 2026
Party	Candidate	Votes	%
Republican	Jimmy Rogers	4,965	54.71%
Republican	Mark Pless (incumbent)	4,110	45.29%
Total votes		9,075	100%

North Carolina House of Representatives 118th district general election, 2026
Party	Candidate	Votes	%
Republican	Jimmy Rogers	19,559	50.80%
Democratic	Danny E. Davis	18,943	49.20%
Total votes		38,445	100%
Republican hold			

North Carolina House of Representatives
Preceded by Mark Pless	Member-elect of the North Carolina House of Representatives from the 118th district Taking office January 1, 2027	Succeeded by TBD
