= April Montgomery =

American politician

Member-elect of the North Carolina House of Representatives from the 51st district
- Assuming office January 1, 2027
- Succeeding: John Sauls

Personal details
- Born: Florida, U.S.
- Party: Independent
- Spouse: David Montgomery
- Children: 3
- Education: Florida State University (BA); University of Florida (MA)
- Occupation: Business executive
- Website: Campaign website

April Montgomery is an American business executive and politician who is a member-elect of the North Carolina House of Representatives from the 51st district. An independent, she defeated Republican Charles Taylor in the 2026 election for the seat held by retiring Republican John Sauls.

== Early life and career ==
Montgomery was born in Florida. She earned a bachelor's degree in history from Florida State University and a master's degree in urban and regional planning from the University of Florida. She moved to North Carolina in 1999 and has been registered as an unaffiliated voter since. She married her husband, David, in 2000, and they moved to Sanford in 2003. They have three sons.

Montgomery is chief development officer at a Chapel Hill-based energy storage company and co-owns a firm with her husband that restores historic commercial buildings. She founded a sustainability consultancy, which she sold to a national environmental firm in 2019. She has served on local economic development and environmental boards.

== Political career ==
Montgomery announced her unaffiliated candidacy for the 51st district in November 2025. In April 2026, the North Carolina State Board of Elections certified 2,826 petition signatures, qualifying her for the ballot, and she faced Republican Charles Taylor, a Sanford city council member; the Democratic candidate had withdrawn. She opposes public funding of private school vouchers and supports preserving local governments' ability to manage growth.

Montgomery won with 13,919 votes (50.70 percent) to Taylor's 13,537 (49.30 percent).

== Electoral history ==
=== 2026 ===
North Carolina House of Representatives 51st district general election, 2026
Party	Candidate	Votes	%
Independent	April Montgomery	13,919	50.70%
Republican	Charles M. Taylor	13,537	49.30%
Total votes		27,456	100%
Independent gain from Republican			

North Carolina House of Representatives
Preceded by John Sauls	Member-elect of the North Carolina House of Representatives from the 51st district Taking office January 1, 2027	Succeeded by TBD
