= Greg Edds =

American politician

Member-elect of the North Carolina House of Representatives from the 76th district
- Assuming office January 1, 2027
- Succeeding: Harry Warren

Personal details
- Party: Republican
- Spouse: Kim Edds
- Children: 3
- Occupation: Insurance agent

Greg Edds is an American insurance agent and politician who is a member-elect of the North Carolina House of Representatives from the 76th district. A Republican, he is chair of the Rowan County Board of Commissioners.

== Career ==
Edds began working for State Farm as a college intern in the early 1980s and later worked at its regional office in Winter Haven, Florida. He moved to Salisbury in 1995 to open his own agency. He chaired the local chamber of commerce board in 2012.

== Political career ==
Edds was elected to the Rowan County Commission in November 2014, in his first run for public office, and was chosen by fellow commissioners as chairman. He is the longest-serving chairman in county history. He is also a past chairman of the Rowan County Republican Party. As a commissioner, he has faced scrutiny over the board's role in allowing an AI data center in the county; the board later passed a one-year moratorium on future data center development.

In 2026, Edds ran for the 76th House district seat vacated by Republican Harry Warren, and defeated Democrat Scott Huffman with 16,091 votes, or about 53.18 percent.

== Electoral history ==
=== 2026 ===
North Carolina House of Representatives 76th district general election, 2026
| Party | Candidate | Votes | % |
|---|---|---|---|
| Republican | Greg Edds | 16,091 | 53.18% |
| Democratic | Scott Huffman | 14,166 | 46.82% |
| Total votes | | 30,257 | 100% |
| Republican hold | | | |

North Carolina House of Representatives
| Preceded by Harry Warren | Member-elect of the North Carolina House of Representatives from the 76th district Taking office January 1, 2027 | Succeeded by TBD |
