= Evonne Hopkins =

American politician

Member-elect of the North Carolina House of Representatives from the 35th district
- Assuming office January 1, 2027
- Succeeding: Mike Schietzelt

Personal details
- Born: 1975 or 1976 (age 50–51)
- Party: Democratic
- Children: 2
- Education: Rollins College (BA); University of San Francisco (JD, MBA)
- Occupation: Attorney

Evonne S. Hopkins (born 1975 or 1976) is an American attorney and politician who is a member-elect of the North Carolina House of Representatives from the 35th district. A Democrat, she defeated Republican incumbent Mike Schietzelt in a 2026 rematch.

== Career ==
Hopkins earned a bachelor's degree from Rollins College and a J.D. and M.B.A. from the University of San Francisco, and moved to the 35th district in 2005. A board-certified family law specialist, she owns a law practice. She received that certification in 2015. She is a mother of two.

== Political career ==
Hopkins first ran for the 35th district in 2024, losing the open seat to Schietzelt by 1,820 votes. In the 2026 rematch, she campaigned on public school funding, infrastructure, and housing affordability. In September 2026, her campaign drew scrutiny after she said at a candidate forum that she had used data from Flock license plate cameras to catch people cheating on their spouses in her legal work. The North Carolina House Democratic Caucus defended her, noting that the cameras are not exclusively operated by law enforcement.

Hopkins won with 25,607 votes (54.95 percent) to Schietzelt's 20,994 (45.05 percent).

== Electoral history ==
=== 2026 ===
North Carolina House of Representatives 35th district general election, 2026
Party	Candidate	Votes	%
Democratic	Evonne Hopkins	25,607	54.95%
Republican	Mike Schietzelt (incumbent)	20,994	45.05%
Total votes		46,601	100%
Democratic gain from Republican			

=== 2024 ===
North Carolina House of Representatives 35th district general election, 2024
Party	Candidate	Votes	%
Republican	Mike Schietzelt	28,651	50.27%
Democratic	Evonne Hopkins	26,831	47.08%
Libertarian	Michael Oakes	1,513	2.65%
Total votes		56,995	100%
Republican gain from Democratic			

North Carolina House of Representatives
Preceded by Mike Schietzelt	Member-elect of the North Carolina House of Representatives from the 35th district Taking office January 1, 2027	Succeeded by TBD
