= Darren Armstrong =

American politician

Member-elect of the North Carolina House of Representatives from the 79th district
- Assuming office January 1, 2027
- Succeeding: Keith Kidwell

Personal details
- Born: 1971 or 1972 (age 53–54) Hyde County, North Carolina, U.S.
- Party: Republican
- Spouse: Dawn Armstrong
- Children: 3
- Education: North Carolina State University (AS)
- Occupation: Farmer, business owner

Darren Armstrong (born 1971 or 1972) is an American farmer, business owner, and politician who is a member-elect of the North Carolina House of Representatives from the 79th district.

== Early life and career ==
Armstrong was raised in Hyde County and lived there until 2020, when he and his family bought a business in Beaufort County, just east of Belhaven. A lifelong farmer, he and his family run a seed conditioning business. He and his wife, Dawn, have three sons. He earned an associate degree in agricultural business from the North Carolina State University Agricultural Institute.

Armstrong is a past chair of the U.S. Grains Council and of North Carolina's corn growers association, and is a trustee of Beaufort County Community College.

== Political career ==
Armstrong announced his campaign for the 79th district in December 2025. His campaign focused on agricultural and small-business issues, and he defeated incumbent Keith Kidwell in the March 2026 primary. With no Democrat running, he faced no opponent in the general election.

== Electoral history ==
=== 2026 ===
North Carolina House of Representatives 79th district Republican primary election, 2026
| Party | Candidate | Votes | % |
|---|---|---|---|
| Republican | Darren Armstrong | 7,447 | 52.27% |
| Republican | Keith Kidwell (incumbent) | 6,799 | 47.73% |
| Total votes | | 14,246 | 100% |

North Carolina House of Representatives 79th district general election, 2026
| Party | Candidate | Votes | % |
|---|---|---|---|
| Republican | Darren Armstrong | 26,370 | 100.00% |
| Total votes | | 26,370 | 100% |
| Republican hold | | | |

North Carolina House of Representatives
| Preceded by Keith Kidwell | Member-elect of the North Carolina House of Representatives from the 79th district Taking office January 1, 2027 | Succeeded by TBD |
