= Jeff Zenger =

American politician

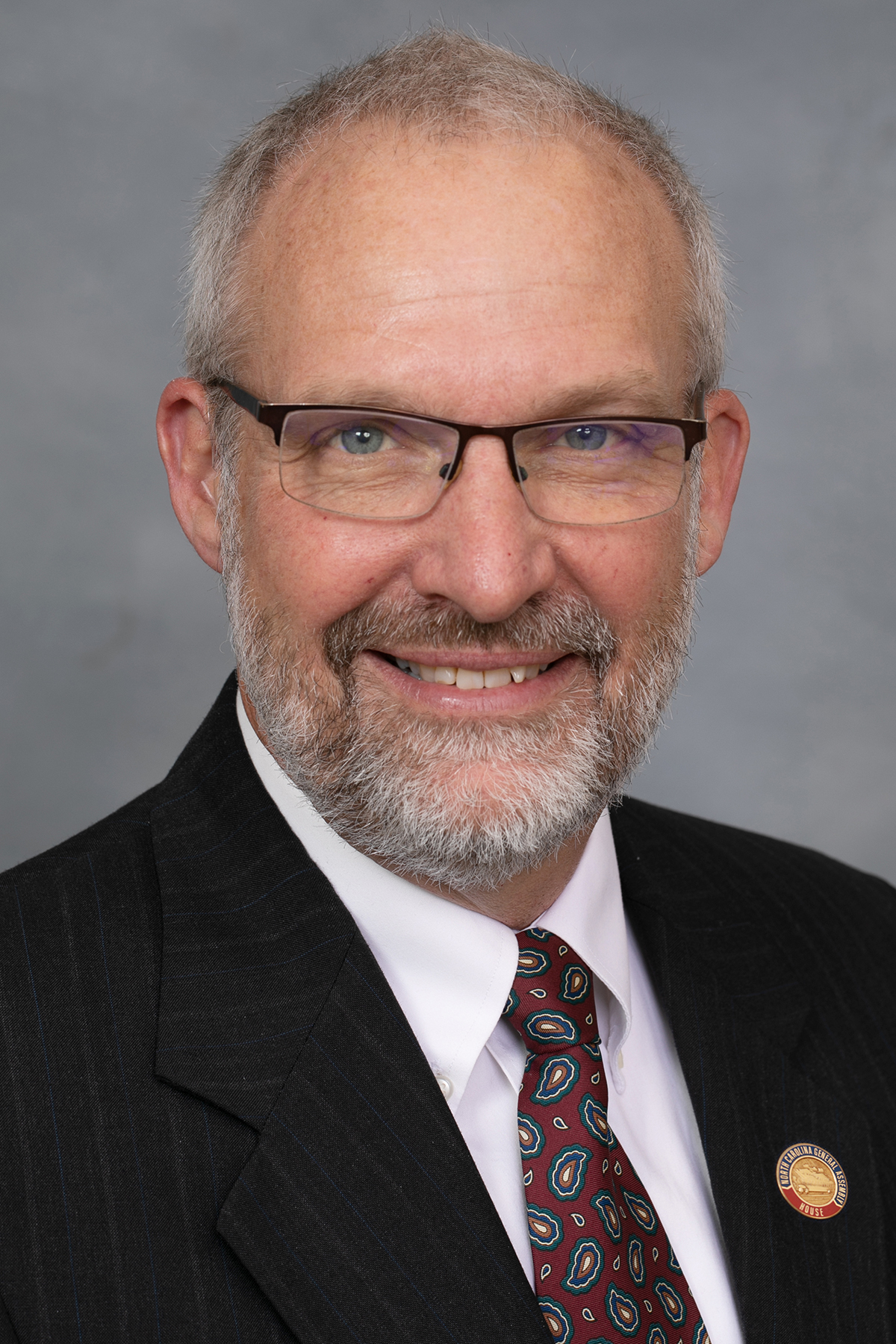

Member of the North Carolina House of Representatives from the 74th district
- Incumbent
- Assumed office January 1, 2021
- Preceded by: Wes Schollander

Personal details
- Born: Jeffrey Alan Zenger
- Party: Republican
- Spouse: Julie
- Children: 4
- Education: Towson University
- Occupation: General contractor and Developer
- Website: Official website

Jeff Zenger is a Republican member of the North Carolina House of Representatives who has represented the 74th district (including parts of Forsyth County) since 2021. He lost his 2026 reelection bid to Amy Taylor North.

== Committee assignments ==
=== 2021-2022 session ===
- Banking
- Election Law and Campaign Finance Reform
- Finance (Vice Chair)
- Judiciary 4
- Regulatory Reform
- State Personnel

== Electoral history ==
North Carolina House of Representatives 74th district general election, 2020
Party	Candidate	Votes	%
Republican	Jeff Zenger	27,843	51.19%
Democratic	Dan Besse	26,550	48.81%
Total votes		54,393	100%
Republican hold			

North Carolina House of Representatives
Preceded by Wes Schollander	Member of the North Carolina House of Representatives from the 74th district 2021–present	Incumbent
