= North Carolina General Assembly of 2023–24 =

156th North Carolina General Assembly 2023–24
←	2021–22	2025–26	→
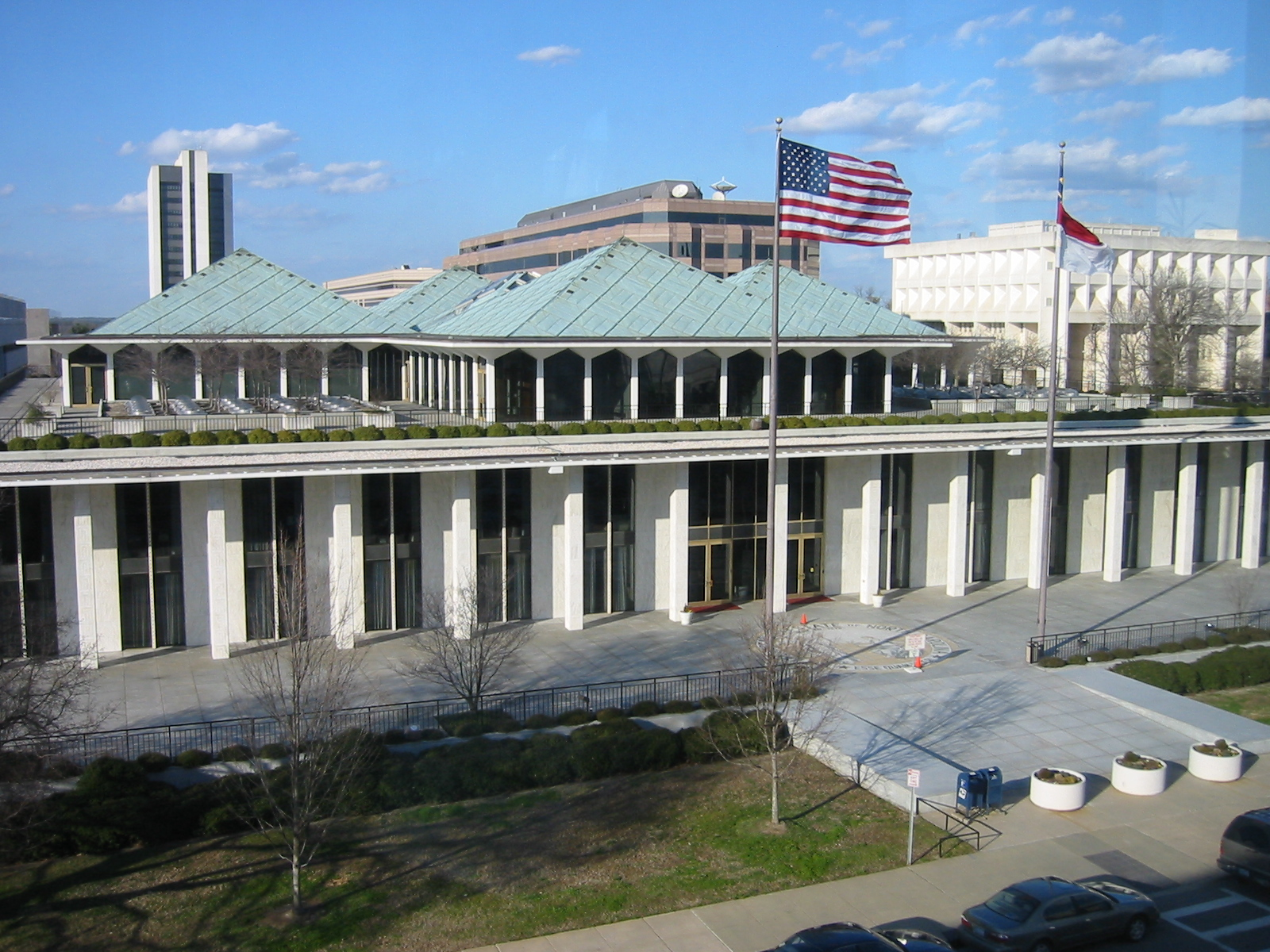
- North Carolina Legislative Building

Overview
- Legislative body: North Carolina General Assembly
- Jurisdiction: North Carolina, United States
- Meeting place: North Carolina State Legislative Building
- Term: 2023–24
- Election: November 8, 2022
- Website: www.ncleg.net

North Carolina Senate
- Members: 50 senators
- President pro tempore of the Senate: Phil Berger
- Majority Leader: Paul Newton
- Minority Leader: Dan Blue
- Party control: Republican Party

North Carolina House of Representatives
- Members: 120 representatives
- Speaker of the House: Tim Moore
- Majority Leader: John Bell
- Minority Leader: Robert Reives
- Party control: Republican Party

The North Carolina General Assembly 2023–24 session is the state legislature that first convened in January 2023 and will conclude in December 2024. Members of the North Carolina Senate and the North Carolina House of Representatives were elected in November 2022.

== House of Representatives ==
The House of Representatives leadership and members are listed below.

=== House leadership ===
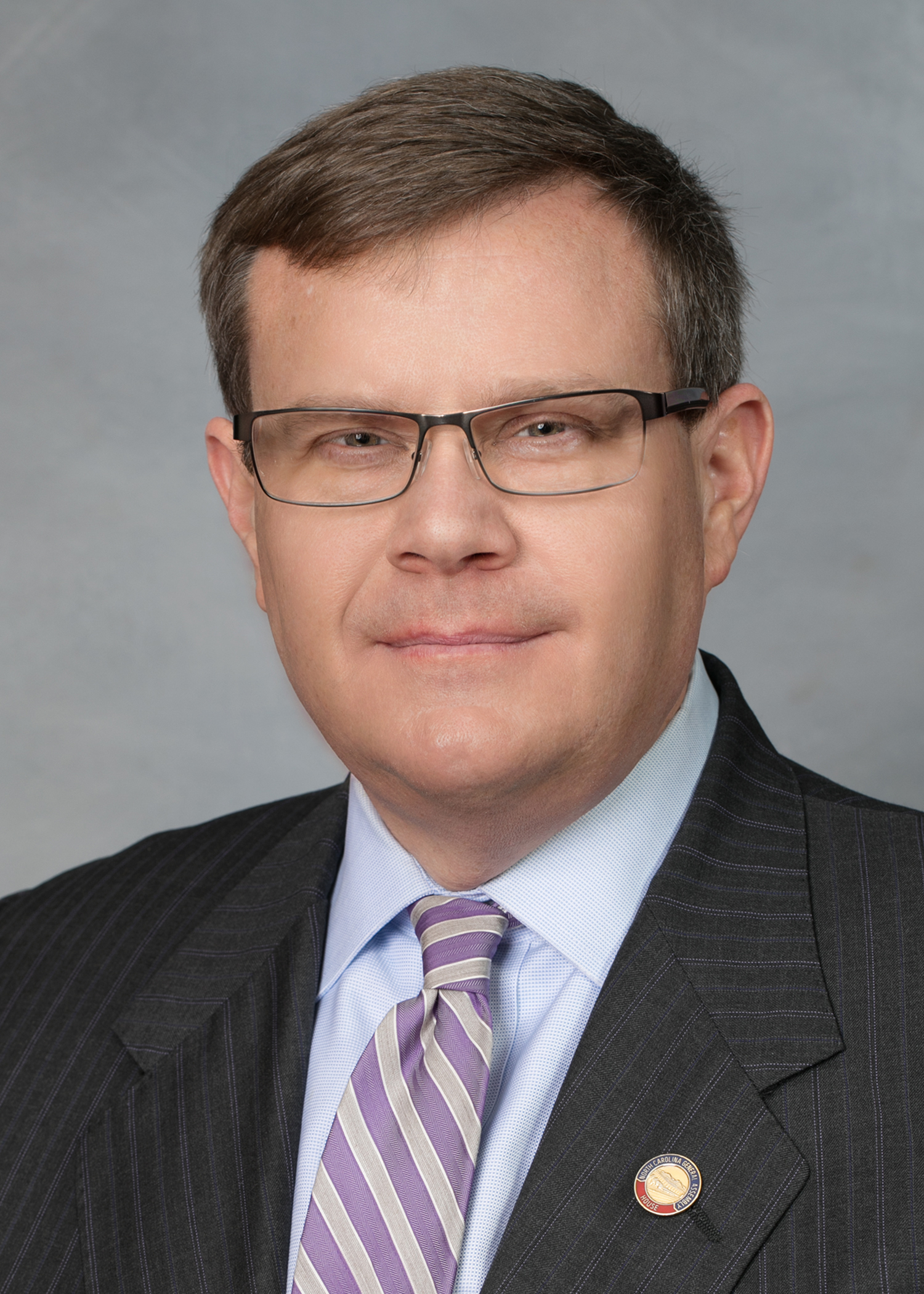
Speaker Tim Moore

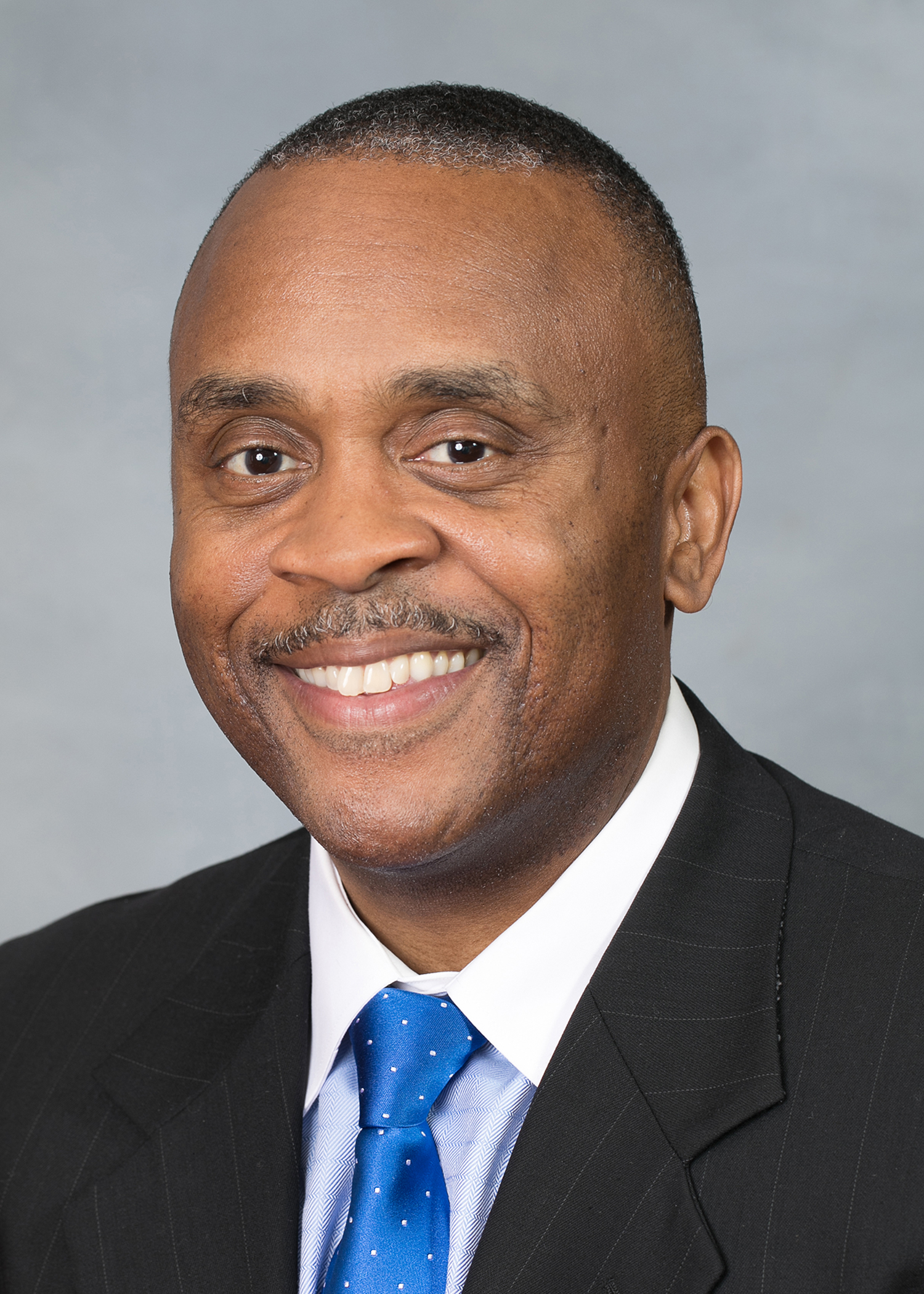
Minority Leader Robert Reives

North Carolina House officers
Position	Name	Party
Speaker Pro Tempore	Sarah Stevens	Republican
Majority Leader	John Bell	Republican
Deputy Majority Leader	Brenden Jones	Republican
Majority Whip	Jon Hardister	Republican
Deputy Majority Whips	Kristin Baker	Republican
Deputy Majority Whips	Karl Gillespie	Republican
Deputy Majority Whips	Jake Johnson	Republican
Deputy Majority Whips	Keith Kidwell	Republican
Deputy Majority Whips	Jeffrey McNeely	Republican
Deputy Majority Whips	Steve Tyson	Republican
Deputy Minority Leader	Ashton Clemmons	Democratic
Minority Whips	Terry Brown	Democratic
Minority Whips	Marcia Morey	Democratic
Minority Whips	Amos Quick	Democratic

=== House members ===
Current House districts and party affiliation Republican Party Democratic Party

The following table shows the district, party, counties represented, and date first elected of members of the House of Representatives. The representatives were elected in new districts passed by the General Assembly in 2022 (House Bill 980 of the 2021–2022 session) to account for population changes following the 2020 census.

District	Representative	Image	Party	Residence	Counties represented	First elected
1st	Ed Goodwin		Republican	Edenton	Currituck, Dare (part), Tyrrell, Washington, Chowan, Perquimans	2018
2nd	Ray Jeffers		Democratic	Roxboro	Person, Durham (part)	2022
3rd	Steve Tyson		Republican	New Bern	Craven (part)	2020
4th	Jimmy Dixon		Republican	Mount Olive	Duplin, Wayne (part)	2010
5th	Bill Ward		Republican	Elizabeth City	Hertford, Gates, Pasquotank, Camden	2022
6th	Joe Pike		Republican	Sanford	Harnett (part)	2022
7th	Matthew Winslow		Republican	Youngsville	Franklin, Granville (part)	2020
8th	Gloristine Brown		Democratic	Bethel	Pitt (part)	2022
9th	Tim Reeder		Republican	Ayden	Pitt (part)	2022
10th	John Bell		Republican	Goldsboro	Wayne (part)	2012
11th	Allison Dahle		Democratic	Raleigh	Wake (part)	2018
12th	Chris Humphrey		Republican	La Grange	Greene, Lenoir, Jones	2018
13th	Celeste Cairns		Republican	Emerald Isle	Carteret, Craven (part)	2022
14th	George Cleveland		Republican	Jacksonville	Onslow (part)	2004
15th	Phil Shepard		Republican	Jacksonville	Onslow (part)	2010
16th	Carson Smith		Republican	Hampstead	Pender, Onslow (part)	2018
17th	Frank Iler		Republican	Shallotte	Brunswick (part)	2009↑
18th	Deb Butler		Democratic	Wilmington	New Hanover (part)	2017↑
19th	Charlie Miller		Republican	Southport	Brunswick (part), New Hanover (part)	2020
20th	Ted Davis Jr.		Republican	Wilmington	New Hanover (part)	2012↑
21st	Ya Liu		Democratic	Cary	Wake (part)	2022
22nd	William Brisson		Republican	Dublin	Bladen, Sampson	2006
23rd	Shelly Willingham		Democratic	Rocky Mount	Edgecombe, Martin, Bertie	2014
24th	Ken Fontenot		Republican	Wilson	Wilson, Nash (part)	2022
25th	Allen Chesser		Republican	Middlesex	Nash (part)	2022
26th	Donna McDowell White		Republican	Clayton	Johnston (part)	2016
27th	Michael Wray		Democratic	Gaston	Warren, Halifax, Northampton	2004
28th	Larry Strickland		Republican	Pine Level	Johnston (part)	2016
29th	Vernetta Alston		Democratic	Durham	Durham (part)	2020↑
30th	Marcia Morey		Democratic	Durham	Durham (part)	2017↑
31st	Zack Forde-Hawkins		Democratic	Durham	Durham (part)	2018
32nd	Frank Sossamon		Republican	Henderson	Vance, Granville (part)	2022
33rd	Rosa Gill		Democratic	Raleigh	Wake (part)	2009↑
34th	Tim Longest		Democratic	Raleigh	Wake (part)	2022
35th	Terence Everitt		Democratic	Wake Forest	Wake (part)	2018
36th	Julie von Haefen		Democratic	Apex	Wake (part)	2018
37th	Erin Paré		Republican	Holly Springs	Wake (part)	2020
38th	Abe Jones		Democratic	Raleigh	Wake (part)	2020
39th	James Roberson		Democratic	Knightdale	Wake (part)	2021↑
40th	Joe John		Democratic	Raleigh	Wake (part)	2016
41st	Maria Cervania		Democratic	Cary	Wake (part)	2022
42nd	Marvin Lucas		Democratic	Spring Lake	Cumberland (part)	2000
43rd	Diane Wheatley		Republican	Linden	Cumberland (part)	2020
44th	Charles Smith		Democratic	Fayetteville	Cumberland (part)	2022
45th	Frances Jackson		Democratic	Fayetteville	Cumberland (part)	2022
46th	Brenden Jones		Republican	Tabor City	Columbus, Robeson (part)	2016
47th	Jarrod Lowery		Republican	Pembroke	Robeson (part)	2022
48th	Garland Pierce		Democratic	Wagram	Hoke, Scotland	2004
49th	Cynthia Ball		Democratic	Raleigh	Wake (part)	2016
50th	Renee Price		Democratic	Hillsborough	Caswell, Orange (part)	2022
51st	John Sauls		Republican	Sanford	Lee, Moore (part)	2016
52nd	Ben Moss		Republican	Rockingham	Richmond, Moore (part)	2020
53rd	Howard Penny Jr.		Republican	Coats	Harnett (part), Johnston (part)	2020↑
54th	Robert Reives		Democratic	Goldston	Chatham, Randolph (part)	2014↑
55th	Mark Brody		Republican	Monroe	Anson, Union (part)	2012
56th	Allen Buansi		Democratic	Chapel Hill	Orange (part)	2022↑
57th	Ashton Clemmons		Democratic	Greensboro	Guilford (part)	2018
58th	Amos Quick		Democratic	Greensboro	Guilford (part)	2016
59th	Jon Hardister		Republican	Whitsett	Guilford (part)	2012
60th	Cecil Brockman		Democratic	High Point	Guilford (part)	2014
61st	Pricey Harrison		Democratic	Greensboro	Guilford (part)	2004
62nd	John Faircloth		Republican	High Point	Guilford (part)	2010
63rd	Stephen Ross		Republican	Burlington	Alamance (part)	2022 (2012–2020)
64th	Dennis Riddell		Republican	Snow Camp	Alamance (part)	2012
65th	Reece Pyrtle		Republican	Stoneville	Rockingham	2021
66th	Sarah Crawford		Democratic	Raleigh	Wake (part)	2022
67th	Wayne Sasser		Republican	Albemarle	Stanly, Montgomery	2018
68th	David Willis		Republican	Waxhaw	Union (part)	2020
69th	Dean Arp		Republican	Monroe	Union (part)	2012
70th	Brian Biggs		Republican	Trinity	Randolph (part)	2022
71st	Kanika Brown		Democratic	Winston-Salem	Forsyth (part)	2022
72nd	Amber Baker		Democratic	Winston-Salem	Forsyth (part)	2020
73rd	Diamond Staton-Williams		Democratic	Harrisburg	Cabarrus (part)	2022
74th	Jeff Zenger		Republican	Lewisville	Forsyth (part)	2020
75th	Donny Lambeth		Republican	Winston-Salem	Forsyth (part)	2012
76th	Harry Warren		Republican	Salisbury	Rowan (part)	2010
77th	Julia C. Howard		Republican	Mocksville	Yadkin, Davie, Rowan (part)	1988
78th	Neal Jackson		Republican	Robbins	Moore (part), Randolph (part)	2022
79th	Keith Kidwell		Republican	Chocowinity	Dare (part), Hyde, Beaufort, Pamlico	2018
80th	Sam Watford		Republican	Thomasville	Davidson (part)	2020 (2014-2018)
81st	Larry Potts		Republican	Lexington	Davidson (part)	2016
82nd	Kristin Baker		Republican	Concord	Cabarrus (part)	2020↑
83rd	Kevin Crutchfield		Republican	Midland	Cabarrus (part), Rowan (part)	2022
84th	Jeffrey McNeely		Republican	Stony Point	Iredell (part)	2019↑
85th	Dudley Greene		Republican	Marion	Avery, Mitchell, Yancey, McDowell (part)	2020
86th	Hugh Blackwell		Republican	Valdese	Burke	2008
87th	Destin Hall		Republican	Granite Falls	Caldwell, Watauga (part)	2016
88th	Mary Belk		Democratic	Charlotte	Mecklenburg (part)	2016
89th	Mitchell Setzer		Republican	Catawba	Catawba (part), Iredell (part)	1998
90th	Sarah Stevens		Republican	Mount Airy	Surry, Wilkes (part)	2008
91st	Kyle Hall		Republican	King	Stokes, Forsyth (part)	2016
92nd	Terry Brown		Democratic	Charlotte	Mecklenburg (part)	2020
93rd	Ray Pickett		Republican	Blowing Rock	Alleghany, Ashe, Watauga (part)	2020
94th	Jeffrey Elmore		Republican	North Wilkesboro	Alexander, Wilkes (part)	2012
95th	Grey Mills		Republican	Mooresville	Iredell (part)	2020 (2008-2012)
96th	Jay Adams		Republican	Hickory	Catawba (part)	2014
97th	Jason Saine		Republican	Lincolnton	Lincoln	2011↑
98th	John Bradford		Republican	Cornelius	Mecklenburg (part)	2020 (2014-2018)
99th	Nasif Majeed		Democratic	Charlotte	Mecklenburg (part)	2018
100th	John Autry		Democratic	Charlotte	Mecklenburg (part)	2016
101st	Carolyn Logan		Democratic	Charlotte	Mecklenburg (part)	2018
102nd	Becky Carney		Democratic	Charlotte	Mecklenburg (part)	2002
103rd	Laura Budd		Democratic	Matthews	Mecklenburg (part)	2022
104th	Brandon Lofton		Democratic	Charlotte	Mecklenburg (part)	2018
105th	Wesley Harris		Democratic	Charlotte	Mecklenburg (part)	2018
106th	Carla Cunningham		Democratic	Charlotte	Mecklenburg (part)	2012
107th	Bobby Drakeford		Democratic	Charlotte	Mecklenburg (part)	2024↑
108th	John Torbett		Republican	Stanley	Gaston (part)	2010
109th	Donnie Loftis		Republican	Gastonia	Gaston (part)	2021↑
110th	Kelly Hastings		Republican	Cherryville	Gaston (part), Cleveland (part)	2010
111th	Tim Moore		Republican	Kings Mountain	Cleveland (part), Rutherford (part)	2002
112th	Tricia Cotham		Republican	Mint Hill	Mecklenburg (part)	2022 (2007-2017)
113th	Jake Johnson		Republican	Saluda	Henderson (part), Polk, Rutherford (part), McDowell (part)	2019↑
114th	Eric Ager		Democratic	Fairview	Buncombe (part)	2022
115th	Lindsey Prather		Democratic	Enka	Buncombe (part)	2022
116th	Caleb Rudow		Democratic	Asheville	Buncombe (part)	2022
117th	Jennifer Balkcom		Republican	Hendersonville	Henderson (part)	2022
118th	Mark Pless		Republican	Canton	Madison, Haywood	2020
119th	Mike Clampitt		Republican	Bryson City	Transylvania, Jackson, Swain	2020 (2016-2018)
120th	Karl Gillespie		Republican	Franklin	Macon, Graham, Cherokee, Clay	2020

Source: NC General Assembly official site

- ↑: Member was first appointed to office.
- Cotham served as a Democrat before her defection on April 5, 2023.

== Senate ==
The North Carolina Senate leadership and members are listed below.

=== Senate leadership ===
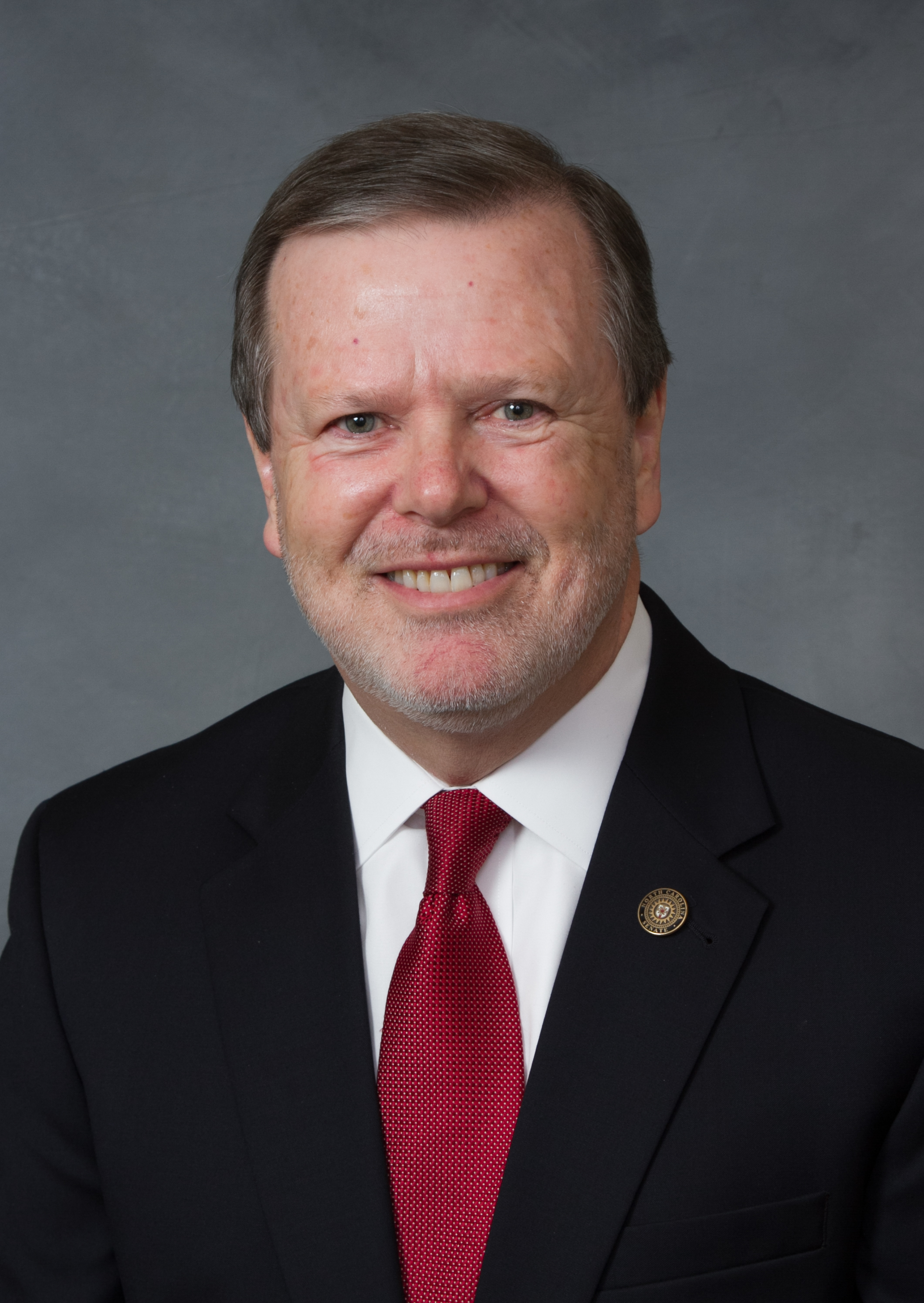
President Pro Tempore Phil Berger

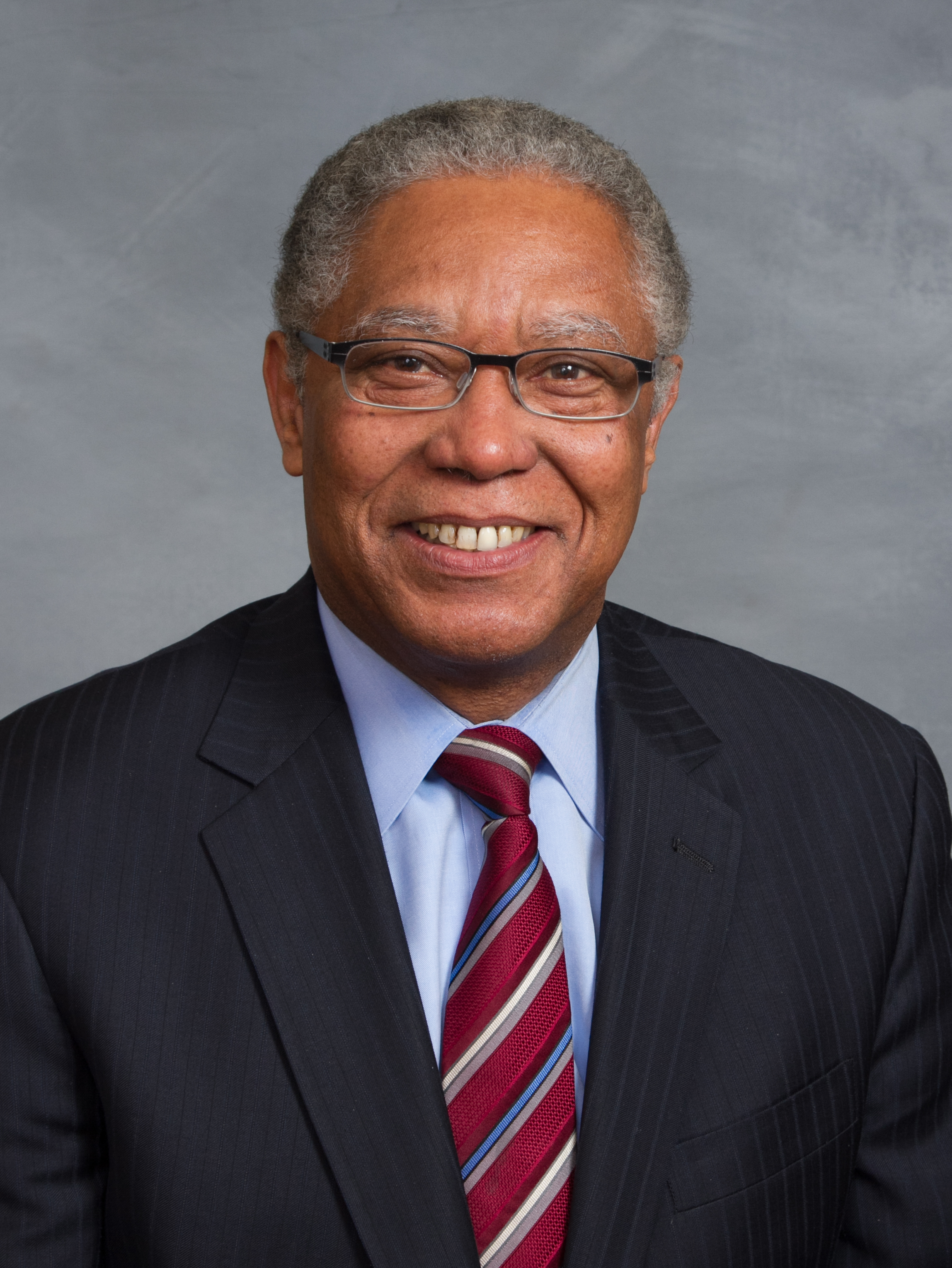
Minority Leader Dan Blue

North Carolina Senate officers
Position	Name	Party
President Pro Tempore	Phil Berger	Republican
Deputy President Pro Tempore	Ralph Hise	Republican
Majority Leader	Paul Newton	Republican
Majority Whip	Tom McInnis	Republican
Majority Whip	Jim Perry	Republican
Joint Majority Caucus Leader	Carl Ford	Republican
Minority Whip	Jay Chaudhuri	Democratic
Minority Caucus Secretary	Julie Mayfield	Democratic

=== Members of the Senate ===
Current House districts and party affiliation Republican Party Democratic Party

The district, party, home residence, counties represented, and date first elected is listed below for the members of the Senate.. The representatives were elected in new districts passed by the General Assembly in 2022 (Senate Bill 744 of the 2021–2022 session) to account for population changes following the 2020 census.

District	Senator	Image	Party	Residence	Counties represented	First elected
1st	Norman W. Sanderson		Republican	Minnesott Beach	Pasquotank, Perquimans, Chowan, Washington, Dare, Hyde, Pamlico, Carteret	2012
2nd	Jim Perry		Republican	Kinston	Lenoir, Craven, Beaufort	2019↑
3rd	Bobby Hanig		Republican	Powells Point	Warren, Northampton, Halifax, Martin, Bertie, Hertford, Gates, Camden, Currituck, Tyrrell	2022↑
4th	Buck Newton		Republican	Wilson	Wilson, Wayne, Greene	2022 (2010–2016)
5th	Kandie Smith		Democratic	Greenville	Edgecombe, Pitt	2022
6th	Michael Lazzara		Republican	Jacksonville	Onslow	2020
7th	Michael Lee		Republican	Wilmington	New Hanover (part)	2020 (2014–2018)
8th	Bill Rabon		Republican	Southport	Columbus, Brunswick, New Hanover (part)	2010
9th	Brent Jackson		Republican	Autryville	Bladen, Sampson (part), Pender, Duplin, Jones	2010
10th	Benton Sawrey		Republican	Clayton	Johnston	2022
11th	Lisa Stone Barnes		Republican	Spring Hope	Vance, Franklin, Nash	2020
12th	Jim Burgin		Republican	Angier	Lee, Harnett, Sampson (part)	2018
13th	Lisa Grafstein		Democratic	Raleigh	Wake (part)	2022
14th	Dan Blue		Democratic	Raleigh	Wake (part)	2009↑
15th	Jay Chaudhuri		Democratic	Raleigh	Wake (part)	2016↑
16th	Gale Adcock		Democratic	Cary	Wake (part)	2022
17th	Sydney Batch		Democratic	Apex	Wake (part)	2021↑
18th	Mary Wills Bode		Democratic	Oxford	Granville, Wake (part)	2022
19th	Val Applewhite		Democratic	Fayetteville	Cumberland (part)	2022
20th	Natalie Murdock		Democratic	Durham	Chatham, Durham (part)	2020↑
21st	Tom McInnis		Republican	Pinehurst	Moore, Cumberland (part)	2014
22nd	Mike Woodard		Democratic	Durham	Durham (part)	2012
23rd	Graig Meyer		Democratic	Hillsborough	Caswell, Person, Orange	2022
24th	Danny Britt		Republican	Lumberton	Hoke, Scotland, Robeson	2016
25th	Amy Galey		Republican	Burlington	Alamance, Randolph (part)	2020
26th	Phil Berger		Republican	Eden	Rockingham, Guilford (part)	2000
27th	Michael Garrett		Democratic	Greensboro	Guilford (part)	2018
28th	Gladys A. Robinson		Democratic	Greensboro	Guilford (part)	2010
29th	Dave Craven		Republican	Asheboro	Randolph (part), Montgomery, Richmond, Anson, Union (part)	2020↑
30th	Steve Jarvis		Republican	Lexington	Davie, Davidson	2020
31st	Joyce Krawiec		Republican	Kernersville	Stokes, Forsyth (part)	2014↑
32nd	Paul A. Lowe Jr.		Democratic	Winston-Salem	Forsyth (part)	2015↑
33rd	Carl Ford		Republican	China Grove	Rowan, Stanly	2018
34th	Paul Newton		Republican	Mount Pleasant	Cabarrus (part)	2016
35th	Todd Johnson		Republican	Monroe	Cabarrus (part), Union (part)	2018
36th	Eddie Settle		Republican	Elkin	Alexander, Wilkes, Surry, Yadkin	2022
37th	Vickie Sawyer		Republican	Mooresville	Iredell, Mecklenburg (part)	2018↑
38th	Mujtaba Mohammed		Democratic	Charlotte	Mecklenburg (part)	2018
39th	DeAndrea Salvador		Democratic	Charlotte	Mecklenburg (part)	2020
40th	Joyce Waddell		Democratic	Charlotte	Mecklenburg (part)	2014
41st	Natasha Marcus		Democratic	Davidson	Mecklenburg (part)	2018
42nd	Rachel Hunt		Democratic	Charlotte	Mecklenburg (part)	2022
43rd	Brad Overcash		Republican	Belmont	Gaston (part)	2022
44th	Ted Alexander		Republican	Shelby	Cleveland, Lincoln, Gaston (part)	2018
45th	Dean Proctor		Republican	Hickory	Catawba, Caldwell (part)	2020↑
46th	Warren Daniel		Republican	Morganton	Burke, McDowell, Buncombe (part)	2010
47th	Ralph Hise		Republican	Spruce Pine	Alleghany, Ashe, Watauga, Caldwell (part), Avery, Mitchell, Yancey, Madison, Haywood (part)	2010
48th	Tim Moffitt		Republican	Hendersonville	Henderson, Polk, Rutherford	2022
49th	Julie Mayfield		Democratic	Asheville	Buncombe (part)	2020
50th	Kevin Corbin		Republican	Franklin	Haywood (part), Transylvania, Jackson, Swain, Macon, Graham, Cherokee, Clay	2020

- ↑: Member was originally appointed to fill the remainder of an unexpired term.

=== Senate legislative activity ===
The North Carolina Senate in May 2024, in a 30–15 vote, approved a bill banning all public wearing of masks for health reasons; the bill was only supported by Senate Republicans and only opposed by Senate Democrats.

== See also ==
- 2022 North Carolina House of Representatives election
- 2022 North Carolina Senate election
- List of North Carolina state legislatures
