= Ashton Clemmons =

American politician

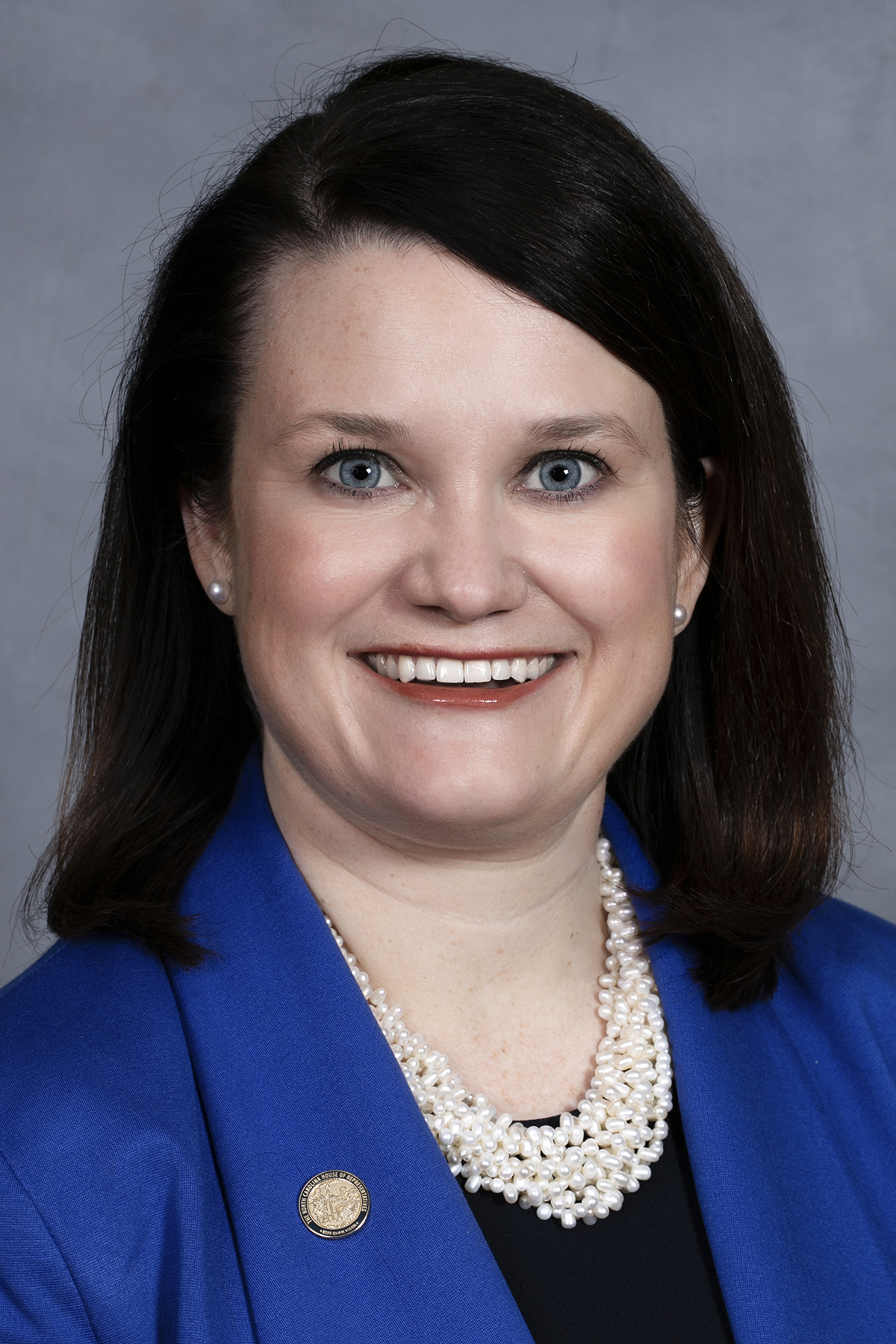

Deputy Minority Leader of the North Carolina House of Representatives
- In office January 1, 2023 – August 5, 2024
- Leader: Robert Reives
- Preceded by: Gale Adcock
- Succeeded by: Cynthia Ball

Member of the North Carolina House of Representatives from the 57th district
- In office January 1, 2019 – August 5, 2024
- Preceded by: Constituency established
- Succeeded by: Tracy Clark

Personal details
- Born: September 2, 1983 (age 42) Alamance County, North Carolina, U.S.
- Party: Democratic
- Spouse: Bryan
- Children: 3
- Education: University of North Carolina, Chapel Hill (BA); Harvard University (MA); University of North Carolina, Greensboro (PhD)
- Occupation: Education consultant
- Website: Campaign website

Ashton Wheeler Clemmons (born September 2, 1983) is a former Democratic member of the North Carolina House of Representatives. Clemmons represented the 57th district (including constituents in north-central Guilford County) from 2019 to 2024. She also served as the Deputy Minority Leader from 2023 to 2024.

== Education and career ==
Clemmons was born in Alamance County, North Carolina. She earned her bachelor's degree from the University of North Carolina at Chapel Hill, her master's in school leadership from Harvard University, and her doctorate of education from the University of North Carolina at Greensboro. She has worked as a school principal in Rockingham and Guilford counties and as assistant superintendent of the Thomasville City Schools. She lives in Greensboro, North Carolina.

Clemmons won the election on November 6, 2018 from the platform of Democratic Party. She secured sixty-eight percent of the vote while her closest rival Republican Troy Lawson secured thirty-three percent. She was re-elected in 2020 and 2022. At the start of the 2023-2024 Session, Clemmons was selected to be the Deputy Minority Leader.

Clemmons resigned from the North Carolina House in August 2024 in order to take a position in the University of North Carolina system.

== Committee assignments ==
=== 2023-2024 session ===
- Commerce
- Education - Community Colleges
- Education - K-12
- Finance
- Rules, Calendar, and Operations of the House

=== 2021-2022 session ===
- Commerce
- Education - Community Colleges
- Education - K-12
- Finance
- Marine Resources and Aqua Culture

=== 2019-2020 session ===
- Commerce
- Education - K-12
- Education - Universities
- Finance

== Electoral history ==
=== 2022 ===
North Carolina House of Representatives 57th district general election, 2022
Party	Candidate	Votes	%
Democratic	Ashton Clemmons (incumbent)	20,186	55.07%
Republican	Michelle C. Bardsley	16,467	44.93%
Total votes		36,653	100%
Democratic hold			

=== 2020 ===
North Carolina House of Representatives 57th district general election, 2020
Party	Candidate	Votes	%
Democratic	Ashton Clemmons (incumbent)	31,138	68.34%
Republican	Chris Meadows	14,427	31.66%
Total votes		45,565	100%
Democratic hold			

=== 2018 ===
North Carolina House of Representatives 57th district general election, 2018
Party	Candidate	Votes	%
Democratic	Ashton Clemmons	22,443	67.57%
Republican	Troy Lawson	10,773	32.43%
Total votes		33,216	100%
Democratic win (new seat)			

North Carolina House of Representatives
Preceded by Pricey Harrison	Member of the North Carolina House of Representatives from the 57th district 2019–2024	Succeeded by Tracy Clark
Political offices
Preceded by Gale Adcock	Deputy Minority Leader of the North Carolina House of Representatives; 2023–2024	Succeeded by Cynthia Ball
