= Tracy Clark =

Tracy Clark may refer to:

- Tracy Clark (politician)
- Tracy Clark (author)
- Tracy Clark (90210)
- Tracy Clark (cyclist)
