= Laura I. Wiley =

American politician from North Carolina

Laura Wiley
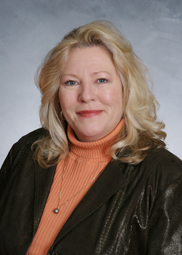
- Official portrait, 2007

Member of the North Carolina House of Representatives from the 61st district
- In office January 1, 2005 – January 1, 2011
- Preceded by: Steve Wood
- Succeeded by: John Faircloth

Personal details
- Born: Laura Ives Twentynine Palms, California, U.S.
- Party: Republican
- Spouse: Bruce C. Wiley
- Children: 2
- Education: University of Tennessee (BS)

Laura Ives Wiley is a former member of the High Point, North Carolina city council, a former member of the North Carolina House of Representatives, and a former member of the University of North Carolina Board of Governors. A Republican, she represented the state's 61st legislative district, which at the time encompassed southwestern Guilford County, a majority of the city of High Point, the town of Jamestown, and the unincorporated area of Sedgefield. She was first elected to the North Carolina General Assembly in 2004 after defeating eight-term Republican incumbent Steve Wood in a primary election. Wiley won an uncontested race in 2006, and defeated primary challenger George Ragsdale in 2008. She chose not to run for re-election in 2010 and is now retired from elected public office. She remained active in political and community activities, having served on the War Memorial Foundation Board of Directors, the High Point Housing Authority Board of Commissioners, and the Senior Resources of Guilford Board of Directors. In March 2013 she was appointed by the North Carolina House of Representatives to serve a four-year term on the Board of Governors of the University of North Carolina system. In September 2016, she was named to The Order of the Long Leaf Pine, which is among the most prestigious awards presented by the Governor of North Carolina. The Order of the Long Leaf Pine is presented to individuals who have a proven record of extraordinary service to the state.

Wiley had previously served on the High Point City Council since 2002, and before that was an active volunteer for both the High Point and Guilford County Republican Parties. She previously served on the North Carolina Republican Party's Executive Committee and on the North Carolina 6th U.S. Congressional District Committee. She is a retired educator who worked in Ohio and Tennessee schools prior to moving to North Carolina in 1997. Born in Twenty-Nine Palms, CA, she is the daughter of a career United States Marine Corps officer. She is a graduate of the University of Tennessee with a B.S. in Education. She is married to Bruce C. Wiley, a retired business executive, and together they resided in High Point. They have two adult children, Adam & Andrew.

== Electoral history ==
=== 2008 ===
North Carolina House of Representative 61st district Republican primary election, 2008
Party	Candidate	Votes	%
Republican	Laura Wiley (incumbent)	3,702	51.80%
Republican	George Ragsdale	3,445	48.20%
Total votes		7,147	100%

North Carolina House of Representatives 61st district general election, 2008
Party	Candidate	Votes	%
Republican	Laura Wiley (incumbent)	26,777	100%
Total votes		26,777	100%
Republican hold			

=== 2006 ===
North Carolina House of Representatives 61st district general election, 2006
Party	Candidate	Votes	%
Republican	Laura Wiley (incumbent)	12,342	100%
Total votes		12,342	100%
Republican hold			

=== 2004 ===
North Carolina House of Representative 61st district Republican primary election, 2004
Party	Candidate	Votes	%
Republican	Laura Wiley	2,515	51.48%
Republican	Steve Wood (incumbent)	2,370	48.52%
Total votes		4,885	100%

North Carolina House of Representatives 61st district general election, 2004
Party	Candidate	Votes	%
Republican	Laura Wiley	25,490	100%
Total votes		25,490	100%
Republican hold			

North Carolina House of Representatives
Preceded by Steve Wood	Member of the North Carolina House of Representatives from the 61st district 2005–2011	Succeeded by John Faircloth
