= John Faircloth =

American politician (born 1939)

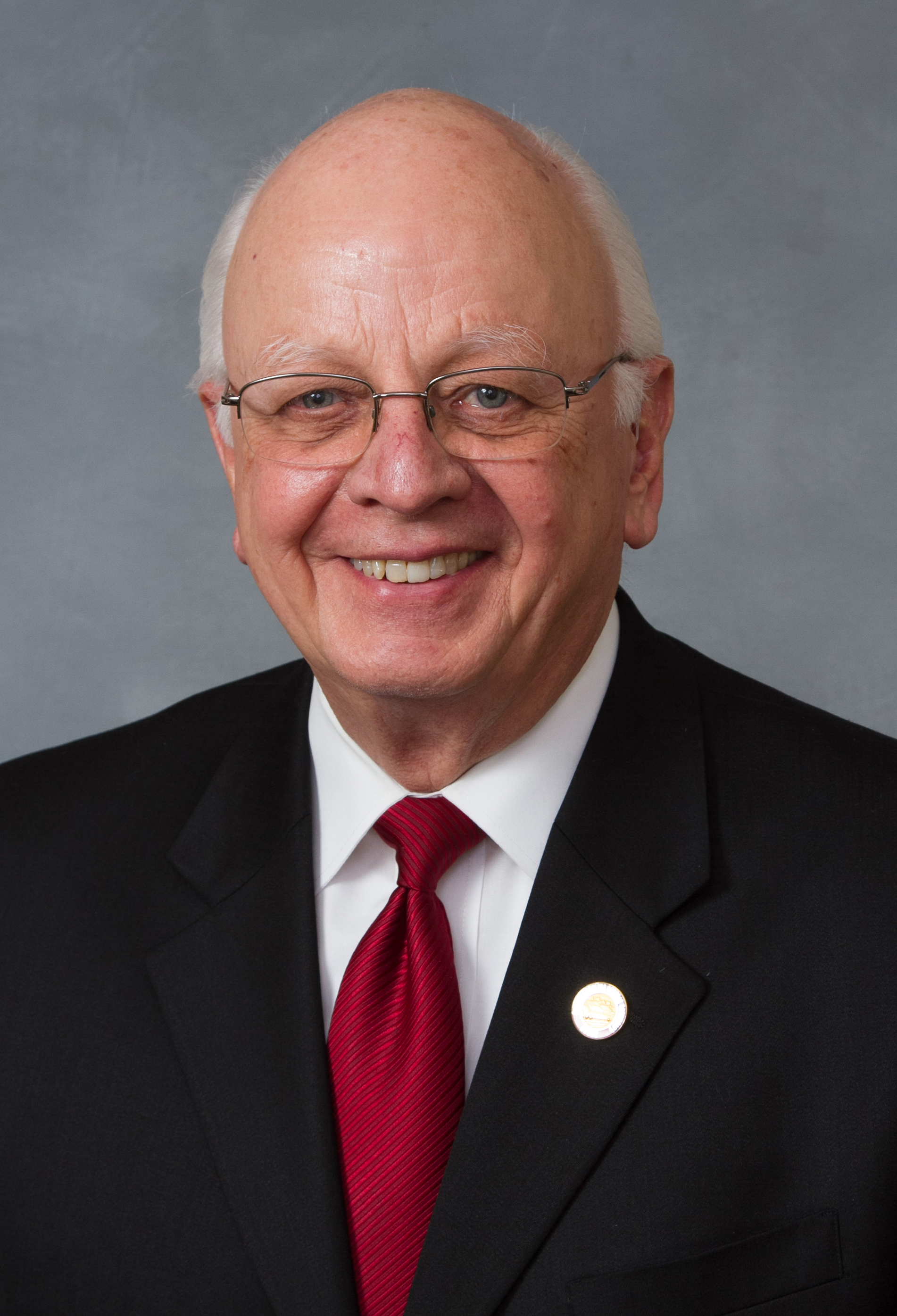
- Official portrait, 2013

Member of the North Carolina House of Representatives
- In office January 1, 2011 – September 6, 2024
- Preceded by: Laura Wiley
- Succeeded by: John Blust
- Constituency: 61st district (2011–2019); 62nd district (2019–2024)

Personal details
- Born: Joseph Aubrey Faircloth Jr. February 16, 1939 (age 87) Greensboro, North Carolina, U.S.
- Party: Republican
- Spouse: Linda
- Children: 3
- Education: Guilford College (AA, BS); University of North Carolina at Greensboro (MA)
- Occupation: Police officer, Real Estate broker
- Website: http://www.johnfaircloth62.com

Joseph Aubrey "John" Faircloth Jr. (born February 19, 1939) is a former Republican member of the North Carolina House of Representatives. He represented the 62nd district (and its preceding 61st district) from 2011 to 2024. The district covers parts of western Guilford County.

Faircloth has a bachelor's degree from Guilford College a master's degree from the University of North Carolina at Greensboro and has also studied at the University of North Carolina at Chapel Hill and the University of Louisville. Faircloth spent his career as a police officer. He was police chief of Salisbury, North Carolina from 1975 to 1976 and of High Point, North Carolina from 1976 to 1992. Since 1992 he has worked as a real estate agent. Faircloth was first elected to the General Assembly in 2010.

== Political career ==
Faircloth represented HD61 from 2011 to 2019 and HD62 since 2019. In 2010 "Faircloth's top three issues are protecting a free-market economy from excessive government control and influence, providing good public safety, and strengthening public education." Faircloth defeated Democrat Brandon Gray in the 2020 election.

== Political positions ==
Faircloth was a primary sponsor of H937, which allowed permit holders to carry concealed firearms inside bars and restaurants that serve alcohol and to keep firearms locked in their car when parked on college or public school campuses. H937 allowed concealed handgun permit holders to keep their "firearms locked in their car when parked on college or public school campuses." Faircloth said the college provision "merely makes legal something that already happens" and "let's don't fool ourselves, there are guns on our campuses." Faircloth on concealed carry holders consuming alcohol at a bar or restaurant: "It's a very overblown concern." Faircloth was also a sponsor of H405, which "would allow prosecutors and judges with concealed-carry permits to bring handguns into courthouses." In 2013, Faircloth sponsored a bill that would have allowed juveniles 15 years of age or older who committed high level felonies to be tried in superior court. The age was originally set at 13, but Faircloth raised it after stakeholder input.

Faircloth resigned from the North Carolina House in September 2024. His vacant seat was filled by John Blust.

== Committee assignments ==
=== 2023–2024 session ===
- Appropriations (Chair)
- Appropriations – Justice and Public Safety (Vice Chair)
- Election Law and Campaign Finance Reform
- Local Government
- Judiciary III
- Transportation

=== 2021–2022 session ===
- Appropriations (Chair)
- Appropriations – Justice and Public Safety (Vice Chair)
- Election Law and Campaign Finance Reform
- Local Government
- Judiciary III
- Transportation

=== 2019–2020 session ===
- Appropriations (Chair)
- Appropriations – Justice and Public Safety (Vice Chair)
- Election Law and Campaign Finance Reform
- State and Local Government
- Judiciary
- Transportation

=== 2017–2018 session ===
- Appropriations (Chair)
- Ethics (Chair)
- Judiciary II (Vice Chair)
- Elections and Ethics Law
- Transportation
- State Personnel

=== 2015–2016 session ===
- Appropriations (Vice Chair)
- Appropriations – Justice and Public Safety (Chair)
- Ethics (Chair)
- Judiciary II (Vice Chair)
- Elections
- Local Government
- Transportation

=== 2013–2014 session ===
- Appropriations (Vice Chair)
- Judiciary
- Elections
- Government
- Transportation

=== 2011–2012 session ===
- Appropriations
- Judiciary
- Elections
- Government
- Transportation

== Electoral history ==
=== 2022 ===
North Carolina House of Representatives 62nd district general election, 2022
Party	Candidate	Votes	%
Republican	John Faircloth (incumbent)	20,404	52.16%
Democratic	Brandon Gray	18,717	47.84%
Total votes		39,121	100%
Republican hold			

=== 2020 ===
North Carolina House of Representatives 62nd district general election, 2020
Party	Candidate	Votes	%
Republican	John Faircloth (incumbent)	30,735	57.41%
Democratic	Brandon Gray	22,801	42.59%
Total votes		53,536	100%
Republican hold			

=== 2018 ===
North Carolina House of Representatives 62nd district general election, 2018
Party	Candidate	Votes	%
Republican	John Faircloth (incumbent)	22,568	57.29%
Democratic	Martha R. Shafer	16,823	42.71%
Total votes		39,391	100%
Republican hold			

=== 2016 ===
North Carolina House of Representatives 61st district general election, 2016
Party	Candidate	Votes	%
Republican	John Faircloth (incumbent)	31,767	100%
Total votes		31,767	100%
Republican hold			

=== 2014 ===
North Carolina House of Representatives 61st district general election, 2014
Party	Candidate	Votes	%
Republican	John Faircloth (incumbent)	19,030	67.17%
Democratic	Ron Weatherford	9,303	32.83%
Total votes		28,333	100%
Republican hold			

=== 2012 ===
North Carolina House of Representatives 61st district general election, 2012
Party	Candidate	Votes	%
Republican	John Faircloth (incumbent)	26,465	63.84%
Democratic	Ron Weatherford	14,988	36.16%
Total votes		41,453	100%
Republican hold			

=== 2010 ===
North Carolina House of Representatives 61st district Republican primary election, 2010
Party	Candidate	Votes	%
Republican	John Faircloth	1,783	42.60%
Republican	Paul Norcross	1,050	25.09%
Republican	Georgia Nixon-Roney	716	17.11%
Republican	Gerald T. Grubb	636	15.20%
Total votes		4,185	100%

North Carolina House of Representatives 61st district general election, 2010
Party	Candidate	Votes	%
Republican	John Faircloth	18,035	100%
Total votes		18,035	100%
Republican hold			

North Carolina House of Representatives
Preceded by Laura Wiley	Member of the North Carolina House of Representatives from the 61st district 2011–2019	Succeeded by Pricey Harrison
Preceded by John Blust	Member of the North Carolina House of Representatives from the 62nd district 2019–2024	Succeeded by John Blust
