= Jon Hardister =

American politician (born 1982)

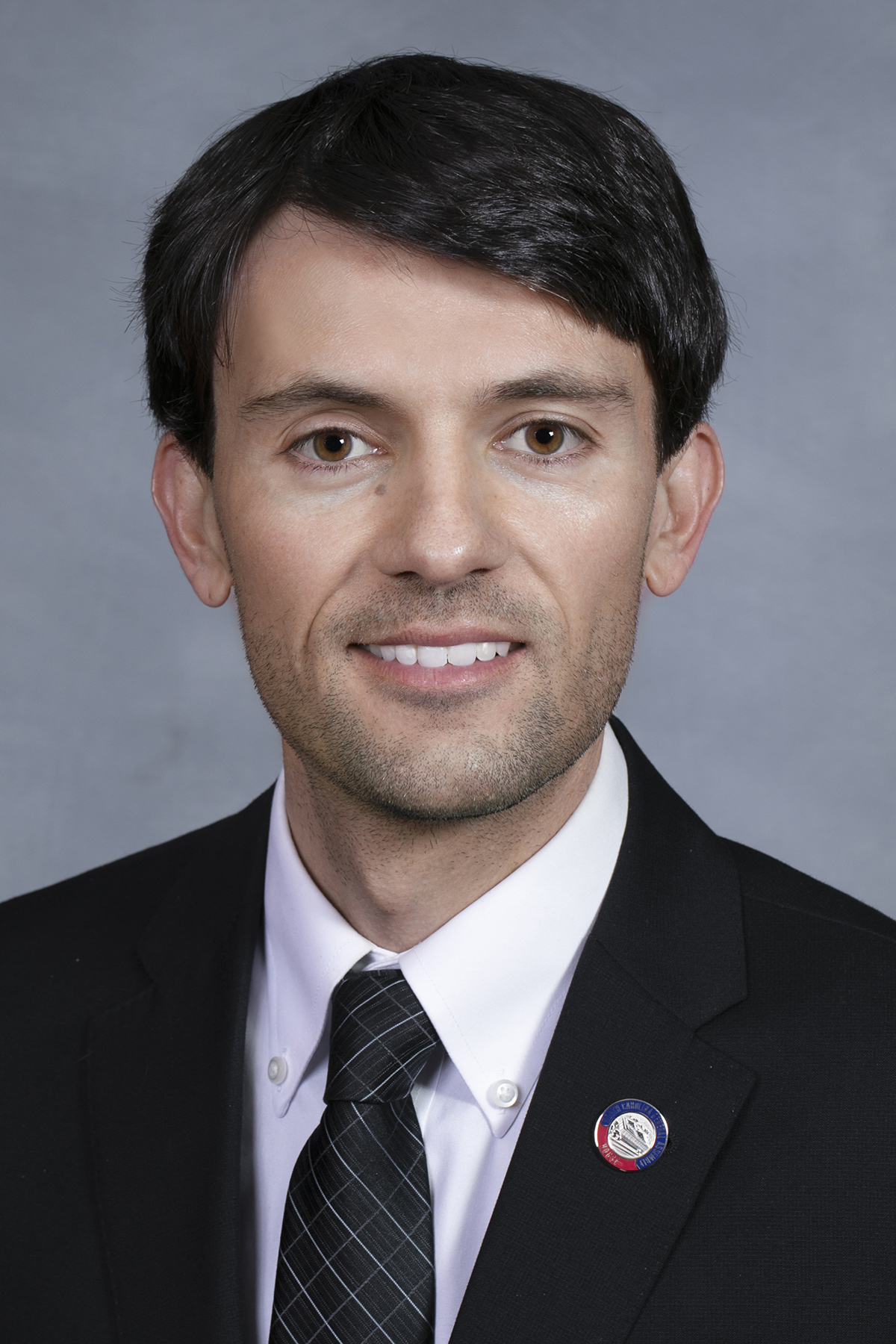

Member of the North Carolina House of Representatives from the 59th district
- In office January 1, 2013 – April 8, 2024
- Preceded by: Constituency established
- Succeeded by: Alan Branson

Personal details
- Born: Jonathan Yates Hardister; October 29, 1982 (age 43) Greensboro, North Carolina, U.S.
- Party: Republican
- Education: Greensboro College (BA)

Jonathan Yates Hardister (born October 29, 1982) is a former Republican member of the North Carolina House of Representatives. He represented the 59th district (including constituents in eastern Guilford County) from 2013 to 2024.

He resigned from the chamber in April 2024 in order to seek employment in the private sector. At the time of his resignation, he was serving as the deputy Majority Whip. Hardister's vacant seat was filled by Alan Branson.

Following his retirement from political office, Hardister partnered with Sebastian King to form the government affairs firm Elevation Strategies.

Hardister is a Greensboro, NC native and graduated from Grimsley High School and Greensboro College.

== Committee assignments ==
=== 2021-2022 session ===
- Appropriations (Vice Chair)
- Appropriations - Education (Chair)
- Education - Universities (Chair)
- Alcoholic Beverage Control (Vice Chair)
- UNC BOG Nominations (Vice Chair)
- Judiciary II
- Redistricting
- Rules, Calendar, and Operations of the House

=== 2019-2020 session ===
- Appropriations (Vice Chair)
- Appropriations - Capital (Chair)
- Education - K-12
- Alcoholic Beverage Control (Vice Chair)
- Banking (Vice Chair)
- Election Law and Campaign Finance Reform
- Rules, Calendar, and Operations of the House

=== 2017-2018 session ===
- Appropriations (Vice Chair)
- Appropriations - Capital (Chair)
- Appropriations - Information Technology
- Education - K-12
- Alcoholic Beverage Control (Vice Chair)
- Banking (Vice Chair)
- Elections and Ethics Law
- Rules, Calendar, and Operations of the House

=== 2015-2016 session ===
- Appropriations
- Appropriations - Capital (Chair)
- Education - K-12
- Alcoholic Beverage Control (Chair)
- Banking
- Elections
- Judiciary I
- Transportation

=== 2013-2014 session ===
- Banking (Vice Chair)
- Education
- Agriculture
- Finance
- Judiciary

== Electoral history ==
=== 2020 ===
North Carolina House of Representatives 59th district Republican primary election, 2020
Party	Candidate	Votes	%
Republican	Jon Hardister (incumbent)	5,644	79.88%
Republican	Allen Chappell	1,422	20.12%
Total votes		7,066	100%

North Carolina House of Representatives 59th district general election, 2020
Party	Candidate	Votes	%
Republican	Jon Hardister (incumbent)	28,474	52.26%
Democratic	Nicole Quick	26,016	47.74%
Total votes		54,500	100%
Republican hold			

=== 2018 ===
North Carolina House of Representatives 59th district Republican primary election, 2018
Party	Candidate	Votes	%
Republican	Jon Hardister (incumbent)	2,692	68.83%
Republican	Mark McDaniel	1,013	25.90%
Republican	Karen C. Albright	206	5.27%
Total votes		3,911	100%

North Carolina House of Representatives 59th district general election, 2018
Party	Candidate	Votes	%
Republican	Jon Hardister (incumbent)	22,119	56.65%
Democratic	Steven A. Buccini	16,924	43.35%
Total votes		39,043	100%
Republican hold			

=== 2016 ===
North Carolina House of Representatives 58th district general election, 2016
Party	Candidate	Votes	%
Republican	Jon Hardister (incumbent)	28,980	60.32%
Democratic	Scott A. Jones	19,060	39.68%
Total votes		48,040	100%
Republican hold			

=== 2014 ===
North Carolina House of Representatives 58th district general election, 2014
Party	Candidate	Votes	%
Republican	Jon Hardister (incumbent)	19,784	60.20%
Democratic	Scott Jones	11,925	36.29%
Libertarian	Paul Meinhart	1,155	3.51%
Total votes		32,864	100%
Republican hold			

=== 2012 ===
North Carolina House of Representatives 59th district Republican primary election, 2012
Party	Candidate	Votes	%
Republican	Jon Hardister	6,737	57.97%
Republican	Sharon Kasica	3,538	30.44%
Republican	Timothy Cook	1,347	11.59%
Total votes		11,622	100%

North Carolina House of Representatives 59th district general election, 2012
Party	Candidate	Votes	%
Republican	Jon Hardister	32,872	100%
Total votes		32,872	100%
Republican win (new seat)			

=== 2010 ===
North Carolina House of Representatives 57th district Republican primary election, 2010
Party	Candidate	Votes	%
Republican	Jon Hardister	1,645	72.31%
Republican	Wendell H. Sawyer	630	27.69%
Total votes		2,275	100%

North Carolina House of Representatives 57th district general election, 2010
Party	Candidate	Votes	%
Democratic	Pricey Harrison (incumbent)	10,664	55.69%
Republican	Jon Hardister	8,485	44.31%
Total votes		19,149	100%
Democratic hold			

North Carolina House of Representatives
Preceded by Maggie Jeffus	Member of the North Carolina House of Representatives from the 59th district 2013–2024	Succeeded by Alan Branson
