= North Carolina's 89th House district =

American legislative district

North Carolina's 89th State House of Representatives district
Representative
Mitchell Setzer; R–Catawba
- Demographics: 78% White; 7% Black; 8% Hispanic; 3% Asian; 3% Multiracial
- Population (2024): 88,652

North Carolina's 89th House district is one of 120 districts in the North Carolina House of Representatives. It has been represented by Republican Mitchell Setzer since 2003.

== Geography ==
Since 2023, the district has included parts of Catawba and Iredell counties. The district overlaps with the 37th and 45th Senate districts.

== District officeholders ==
=== Multi-member district ===
Representative	Party	Dates	Notes	Representative	Party	Dates	Notes	Counties
District created January 1, 1993.
Mary Jarrell (High Point)	Democratic	January 1, 1993 – January 1, 1995	Redistricted from the 28th district. Lost re-election.	Maggie Jeffus (Greensboro)	Democratic	January 1, 1993 – January 1, 1995	Redistricted from the 27th district. Lost re-election.	1993–2003; Part of Guilford County.
John A. Cocklereece (Greensboro)	Republican	January 1, 1995 – January 1, 1997	Lost re-election.	Joanne Sharpe (Greensboro)	Republican	January 1, 1995 – January 1, 1997	Lost re-election.	1993–2003; Part of Guilford County.
Mary Jarrell (High Point)	Democratic	January 1, 1997 – January 1, 2003	Redistricted to the 61st district and retired.	Maggie Jeffus (Greensboro)	Democratic	January 1, 1997 – January 1, 2003	Redistricted to the 59th district.	1993–2003; Part of Guilford County.

=== Single-member district ===
Representative	Party	Dates	Notes	Counties
Mitchell Setzer (Catawba)	Republican	January 1, 2003 – Present	Redistricted from the 43rd district.	2003–2005; Part of Catawba County.
Mitchell Setzer (Catawba)	Republican	January 1, 2003 – Present	Redistricted from the 43rd district.	2005–2013; Parts of Catawba and Iredell counties.
Mitchell Setzer (Catawba)	Republican	January 1, 2003 – Present	Redistricted from the 43rd district.	2013–2023; Part of Catawba County.
Mitchell Setzer (Catawba)	Republican	January 1, 2003 – Present	Redistricted from the 43rd district.	2023–Present; Parts of Catawba and Iredell counties.

== Election results ==
=== 2026 ===
North Carolina House of Representatives 89th district Republican primary election, 2026
Party	Candidate	Votes	%
Republican	Mitchell Setzer (incumbent)	8,022	86.18%
Republican	Lisa Deaton Koperski	1,286	13.82%
Total votes		9,308	100%

North Carolina House of Representatives 89th district general election, 2026
Party	Candidate	Votes	%
Republican	Mitchell Setzer (incumbent)		
Democratic	Robert (Spider) Thompson		
Total votes			100%

=== 2024 ===
North Carolina House of Representatives 89th district general election, 2024
Party	Candidate	Votes	%
Republican	Mitchell Setzer (incumbent)	38,122	75.99%
Democratic	Greg Cranford	12,044	24.01%
Total votes		50,166	100%
Republican hold			

=== 2022 ===
North Carolina House of Representatives 89th district Republican primary election, 2022
Party	Candidate	Votes	%
Republican	Mitchell Setzer (incumbent)	5,516	57.19%
Republican	Kelli Weaver Moore	3,016	31.27%
Republican	Benjamin Devine	1,113	11.54%
Total votes		9,645	100%

North Carolina House of Representatives 89th district general election, 2022
Party	Candidate	Votes	%
Republican	Mitchell Setzer (incumbent)	27,255	100%
Total votes		27,255	100%
Republican hold			

=== 2020 ===
North Carolina House of Representatives 89th district general election, 2020
Party	Candidate	Votes	%
Republican	Mitchell Setzer (incumbent)	31,044	74.35%
Democratic	Greg Cranford	10,711	25.65%
Total votes		41,755	100%
Republican hold			

=== 2018 ===
North Carolina House of Representatives 89th district general election, 2018
Party	Candidate	Votes	%
Republican	Mitchell Setzer (incumbent)	18,959	72.25%
Democratic	Greg Cranford	7,281	27.75%
Total votes		26,240	100%
Republican hold			

=== 2016 ===
North Carolina House of Representatives 89th district general election, 2016
Party	Candidate	Votes	%
Republican	Mitchell Setzer (incumbent)	28,409	100%
Total votes		28,409	100%
Republican hold			

=== 2014 ===
North Carolina House of Representatives 89th district general election, 2014
Party	Candidate	Votes	%
Republican	Mitchell Setzer (incumbent)	16,616	100%
Total votes		16,616	100%
Republican hold			

=== 2012 ===
North Carolina House of Representatives 89th district general election, 2012
Party	Candidate	Votes	%
Republican	Mitchell Setzer (incumbent)	25,735	100%
Total votes		25,735	100%
Republican hold			

=== 2010 ===
North Carolina House of Representatives 89th district general election, 2010
Party	Candidate	Votes	%
Republican	Mitchell Setzer (incumbent)	16,119	100%
Total votes		16,119	100%
Republican hold			

=== 2008 ===
North Carolina House of Representatives 89th district general election, 2008
Party	Candidate	Votes	%
Republican	Mitchell Setzer (incumbent)	25,176	100%
Total votes		25,176	100%
Republican hold			

=== 2006 ===
North Carolina House of Representatives 89th district general election, 2006
Party	Candidate	Votes	%
Republican	Mitchell Setzer (incumbent)	11,301	100%
Total votes		11,301	100%
Republican hold			

=== 2004 ===
North Carolina House of Representatives 89th district general election, 2004
Party	Candidate	Votes	%
Republican	Mitchell Setzer (incumbent)	20,460	100%
Total votes		20,460	100%
Republican hold			

=== 2002 ===
North Carolina House of Representatives 89th district general election, 2002
Party	Candidate	Votes	%
Republican	Mitchell Setzer (incumbent)	12,912	85.97%
Libertarian	Barry Woodfin	2,107	14.03%
Total votes		15,019	100%
Republican hold			

=== 2000 ===
North Carolina House of Representatives 89th district general election, 2000
Party	Candidate	Votes	%
Democratic	Mary Jarrell (incumbent)	25,799	30.29%
Democratic	Maggie Jeffus (incumbent)	24,246	28.46%
Republican	Joanne Sharpe	17,187	20.18%
Republican	Dottie Salerno	16,307	19.14%
Libertarian	Thomas A. "Tom" Bailey	1,642	1.93%
Total votes		85,181	100%
Democratic hold			
Democratic hold			
