= Ya Liu =

American politician

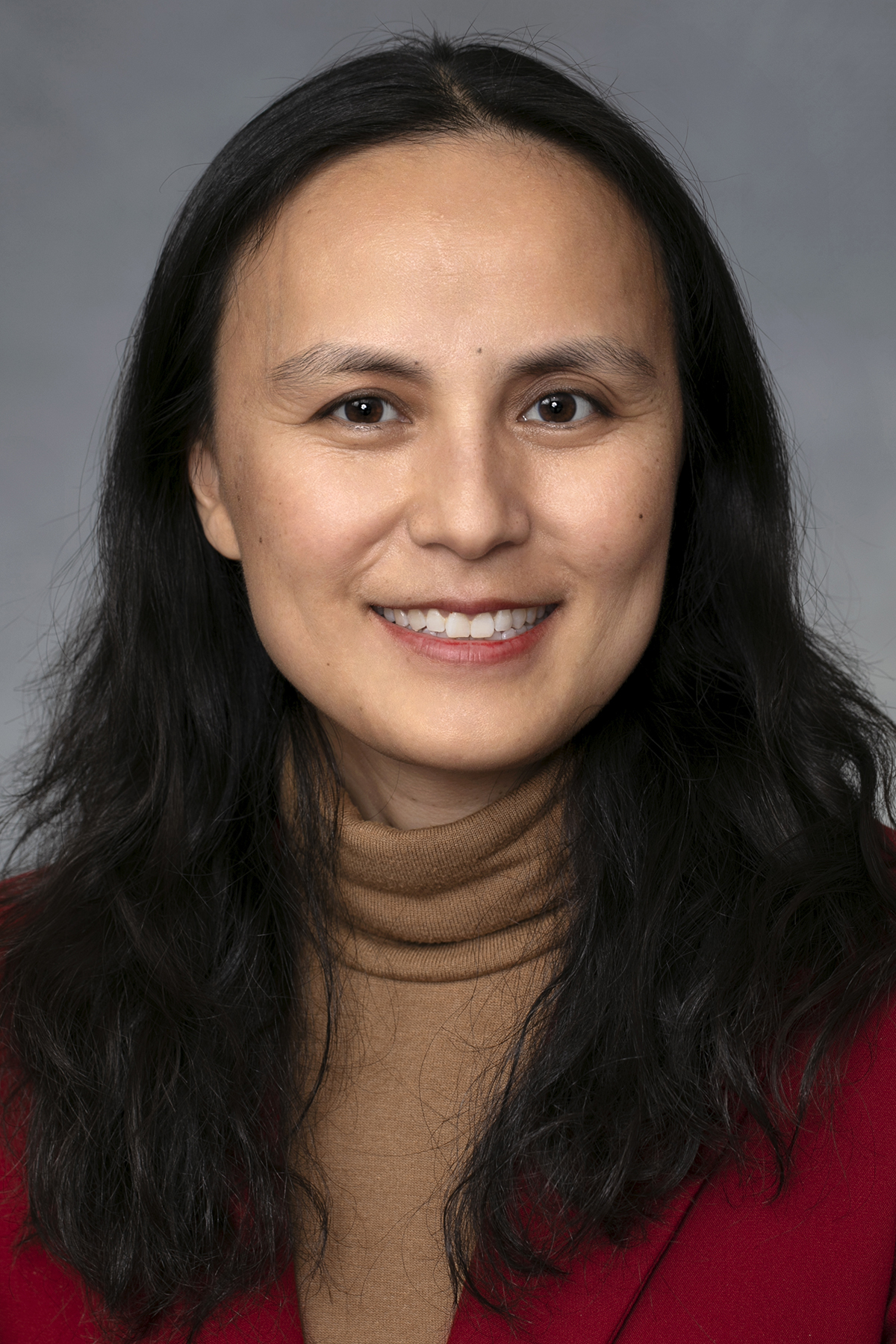
- Official portrait, 2023

Minority Whip of the North Carolina House of Representatives
- Incumbent
- Assumed office January 1, 2025 Serving with Gloristine Brown and Amos Quick
- Leader: Robert T. Reives, II
- Preceded by: Terry M. Brown Jr. Marcia Morey

Member of the North Carolina House of Representatives from the 21st district
- Incumbent
- Assumed office January 1, 2023
- Preceded by: Constituency established

Member of the Cary Town Council from District D
- In office December 12, 2019 – January 1, 2023
- Preceded by: Ken George
- Succeeded by: Ryan Eades

Personal details
- Born: Guangya Liu; 1980 or 1981 (age 45–46) Henan, China
- Party: Democratic
- Children: 3
- Education: Nankai University; North Carolina State University (PhD); North Carolina Central University (JD)
- Occupation: Attorney & small business owner
- Website: Official website

Chinese name
- Traditional Chinese: 劉廣亞
- Simplified Chinese: 刘广亚
Transcriptions
Standard Mandarin
- Hanyu Pinyin: Liú Guǎngyà

Guangya Liu (born 1980–1981; Chinese: 刘广亚) is an American politician currently serving as a member of the North Carolina House of Representatives, representing the 21st district (including portions of western Wake County) since 2023. A Democrat, Liu previously served on the Cary Town Council from 2019 to 2023. During her term, Liu was investigated and later suspended for 2 years for mismanagement of financial trust accounts by the North Carolina Bar. The suspension was stayed for two years for monitoring.

== Biography ==
Born in Henan, China, Liu graduated from Nankai University majoring in sociology and immigrated to the United States in 2003 to finish her education. She settled in Cary, North Carolina, where she married and has three children with her husband. Liu is a board member of the Chinese-American Friendship Association of North Carolina.

In 2021 Liu was investigated and later suspended for 2 years for mismanagement of financial trust accounts by the North Carolina Bar. The suspension was stayed for two years for monitoring.

== Electoral history ==
North Carolina House of Representatives 21st district general election, 2022
Party	Candidate	Votes	%
Democratic	Ya Liu	18,857	67.69%
Republican	Gerard Falzon	8,342	29.95%
Libertarian	Joshua Morris	658	2.36%
Total votes		27,857	100%
Democratic win (new seat)			

=== 2019 ===
Cary Town Council district D general election, 2019
Candidate	Votes	%
Ya Liu	3,523	57.49%
Ken George (incumbent)	2,237	36.50%
Beth Friedrich	365	5.96%
Write-in	3	0.05%
Total votes	6,128	100%

== Committee assignments ==
=== 2023-2024 session ===
- Appropriations
- Appropriations - Health and Human Services
- Banking
- Families, Children, and Aging Policy
- Health

North Carolina House of Representatives
Preceded by Raymond Smith Jr.	Member of the North Carolina House of Representatives from the 21st district 2023–Present	Incumbent
