= Alan Branson =

American politician

Jerry "Alan" Branson
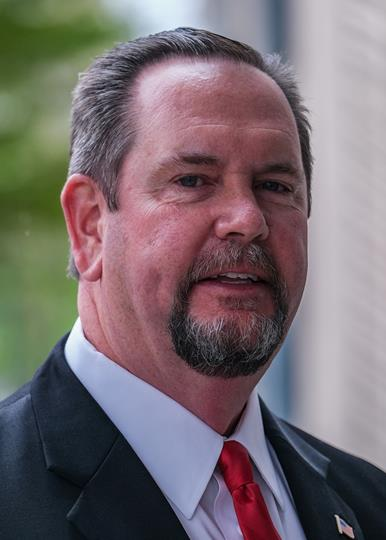

Member of the North Carolina House of Representatives from the 59th district
- Incumbent
- Assumed office April 24, 2024
- Preceded by: Jon Hardister

Personal details
- Born: December 9, 1966 (age 59)
- Party: Republican

Jerry "Alan" Branson (born December 9, 1966) is a Republican member of the North Carolina House of Representatives. He was appointed to his seat after his predecessor, Jon Hardister, resigned. He owns a family trucking company. He is a Methodist.

== Electoral history ==
Branson ran to be county commissioner for Guilford County, North Carolina, in 2020 and 2022 and lost both times, though he had served eight years previously. He won the Republican primary to represent the 59th district in the upcoming 2024 North Carolina House of Representatives election against Democratic candidate Tanneshia Dukes.

North Carolina House of Representatives
Preceded by Jon Hardister	Member of the North Carolina House of Representatives from the 59th district 2024-Present	Incumbent
