= North Carolina's 57th House district =

American legislative district

North Carolina's 57th State House of Representatives district
Representative
Tracy Clark; D–Greensboro
- Demographics: 43% White; 38% Black; 9% Hispanic; 5% Asian; 1% Other; 5% Multiracial
- Population (2024): 91,856

North Carolina's 57th House district is one of 120 districts in the North Carolina House of Representatives. It is currently represented by Democrat Tracy Clark, who was appointed by the Guilford County Democratic Party following Ashton Clemmons's resignation on August 5, 2024.

== Geography ==
Since 2003, the district has included part of Guilford County. The district overlaps with the 26th and 28th Senate districts.

Representative	Party	Dates	Notes	Counties
District created January 1, 1985.
LeRoy Page Spoon Jr. (Charlotte)	Republican	January 1, 1985 – January 1, 1987	Redistricted from the 36th district.	1985–2003; Part of Mecklenburg County.
Harry Clinton Grimmer (Charlotte)	Republican	January 1, 1987 – January 1, 1993		1985–2003; Part of Mecklenburg County.
Connie Wilson (Charlotte)	Republican	January 1, 1993 – January 1, 2003	Redistricted to the 104th district.	1985–2003; Part of Mecklenburg County.
Joanne Bowie (Greensboro)	Republican	January 1, 2003 – January 1, 2005	Redistricted from the 29th district. Lost re-election.	2003–Present; Parts of Guilford County.
Pricey Harrison (Greensboro)	Democratic	January 1, 2005 – January 1, 2019	Redistricted to the 61st district.	2003–Present; Parts of Guilford County.
Ashton Clemmons (Greensboro)	Democratic	January 1, 2019 – August 5, 2024	Resigned.	2003–Present; Parts of Guilford County.
Vacant		August 5, 2024 – August 6, 2024		2003–Present; Parts of Guilford County.
Tracy Clark (Greensboro)	Democratic	August 6, 2024 – Present	Appointed to finish Clemmons's term.	2003–Present; Parts of Guilford County.

== Election results ==
=== 2024 ===
North Carolina House of Representatives 57th district general election, 2024
Party	Candidate	Votes	%
Democratic	Tracy Clark (incumbent)	31,986	68.14%
Republican	Janice Davis	14,955	31.86%
Total votes		46,941	100%
Democratic hold			

=== 2022 ===
North Carolina House of Representatives 57th district general election, 2022
Party	Candidate	Votes	%
Democratic	Ashton Clemmons (incumbent)	20,186	55.07%
Republican	Michelle C. Bardsley	16,467	44.93%
Total votes		36,653	100%
Democratic hold			

=== 2020 ===
North Carolina House of Representatives 57th district general election, 2020
Party	Candidate	Votes	%
Democratic	Ashton Clemmons (incumbent)	31,138	68.34%
Republican	Chris Meadows	14,427	31.66%
Total votes		45,565	100%
Democratic hold			

=== 2018 ===
North Carolina House of Representatives 57th district general election, 2018
Party	Candidate	Votes	%
Democratic	Ashton Clemmons	22,443	67.57%
Republican	Troy Lawson	10,773	32.43%
Total votes		33,216	100%
Democratic win (new seat)			

=== 2016 ===
North Carolina House of Representatives 57th district general election, 2016
Party	Candidate	Votes	%
Democratic	Pricey Harrison (incumbent)	31,518	100%
Total votes		31,518	100%
Democratic hold			

=== 2014 ===
North Carolina House of Representatives 57th district Democratic primary election, 2014
Party	Candidate	Votes	%
Democratic	Pricey Harrison (incumbent)	3,837	68.55%
Democratic	Jim Kee	1,760	31.45%
Total votes		5,597	100%

North Carolina House of Representatives 57th district general election, 2014
Party	Candidate	Votes	%
Democratic	Pricey Harrison (incumbent)	17,577	100%
Total votes		17,577	100%
Democratic hold			

=== 2012 ===
North Carolina House of Representatives 57th district general election, 2012
Party	Candidate	Votes	%
Democratic	Pricey Harrison (incumbent)	32,020	100%
Total votes		32,020	100%
Democratic hold			

=== 2010 ===
North Carolina House of Representatives 57th district Republican primary election, 2010
Party	Candidate	Votes	%
Republican	Jon Hardister	1,645	72.31%
Republican	Wendell H. Sawyer	630	27.69%
Total votes		2,275	100%

North Carolina House of Representatives 57th district general election, 2010
Party	Candidate	Votes	%
Democratic	Pricey Harrison (incumbent)	10,664	55.69%
Republican	Jon Hardister	8,485	44.31%
Total votes		19,149	100%
Democratic hold			

=== 2008 ===
North Carolina House of Representatives 57th district general election, 2008
Party	Candidate	Votes	%
Democratic	Pricey Harrison (incumbent)	25,769	100%
Total votes		25,769	100%
Democratic hold			

=== 2006 ===
North Carolina House of Representatives 57th district Republican primary election, 2006
Party	Candidate	Votes	%
Republican	Ron Styers	528	64.47%
Republican	Joseph W. Rahenkamp Sr.	291	35.53%
Total votes		819	100%

North Carolina House of Representatives 57th district general election, 2006
Party	Candidate	Votes	%
Democratic	Pricey Harrison (incumbent)	9,897	63.05%
Republican	Ron Styers	5,799	36.95%
Total votes		15,696	100%
Democratic hold			

=== 2004 ===
North Carolina House of Representatives 57th district general election, 2004
Party	Candidate	Votes	%
Democratic	Pricey Harrison	16,606	56.65%
Republican	Joanne Bowie (incumbent)	12,707	43.35%
Total votes		29,313	100%
Democratic gain from Republican			

=== 2002 ===
North Carolina House of Representatives 57th district general election, 2002
Party	Candidate	Votes	%
Republican	Joanne Bowie (incumbent)	20,388	84.41%
Libertarian	Walter Sperko	3,766	15.59%
Total votes		24,154	100%
Republican hold			

=== 2000 ===
North Carolina House of Representatives 57th district general election, 2000
Party	Candidate	Votes	%
Republican	Connie Wilson (incumbent)	23,278	100%
Total votes		23,278	100%
Republican hold			
