= Tracy Clark (politician) =

American politician

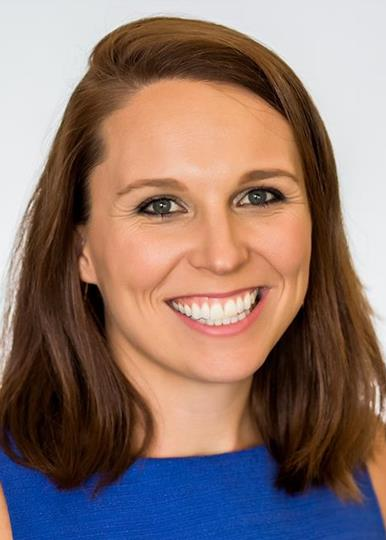

Member of the North Carolina House of Representatives from the 57th district
- Incumbent
- Assumed office August 6, 2024
- Preceded by: Ashton Clemmons

Personal details
- Party: Democratic

Tracy Clark is an American politician. She serves as a Democratic member for the 57th district of the North Carolina House of Representatives.
