= Pricey Harrison =

American politician

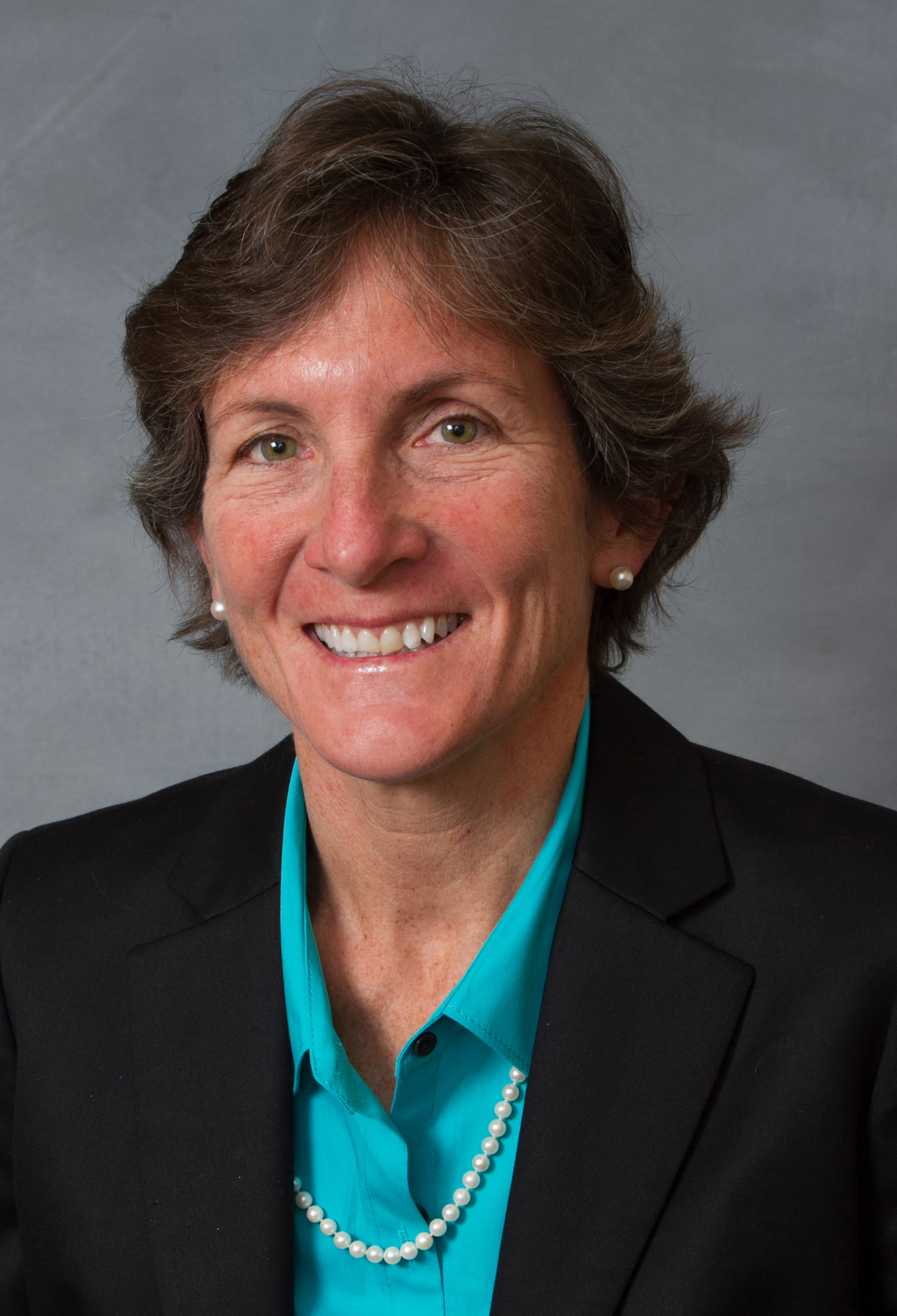

Member of the North Carolina House of Representatives
- Incumbent
- Assumed office January 1, 2005
- Preceded by: Joanne Bowie
- Constituency: 57th District (2005–2019); 61st District (2019–present)

Personal details
- Born: August 31, 1958 (age 67)
- Party: Democratic
- Education: Duke University (BA); University of North Carolina, Chapel Hill (JD)
- Profession: Attorney
- Website: Campaign website

Mary Price Harrison (born August 31, 1958) is an American attorney and politician from North Carolina. Harrison is a Democratic member of the North Carolina House of Representatives, having first been elected in 2004. She has represented the 61st District (and the preceding 57th District), including constituents in central Guilford County, since 2005.

== Early life and career ==
Raised in Greensboro, North Carolina, Harrison earned a bachelor's degree from Duke University and a Juris Doctor from the University of North Carolina at Chapel Hill. Prior to joining the NC House of Representatives, she worked as a civil litigator and communications law attorney. A noted civic leader, she has served as President of the Julian Price Family Foundation, and in leadership with the NC Environmental Defense Fund and the Piedmont Land Conservancy.

Harrison was first elected to the North Carolina House of Representatives in 2004. She has been recognized as a leader on environmental issues, clean energy, and green jobs, receiving commendation for her work as Vice Chair of the legislative committees on the Environment and Judiciary. In 2025, Harrison introduced legislation to prohibit the commercial farming of octopuses, citing animal rights and environmental concerns. She's a member of the Progressive House Caucus.

== Committee assignments ==
=== 2021-2022 session ===
- Appropriations
- Appropriations - Agriculture and Natural and Economic Resources
- Environment (Vice Chair)
- Election Law and Campaign Finance Reform
- Energy and Public Utilities
- Judiciary I
- Marine Resources and Aqua Culture
- Redistricting

=== 2019-2020 session ===
- Appropriations
- Appropriations - Agriculture and Natural and Economic Resources
- Environment (Vice Chair)
- Election Law and Campaign Finance Reform
- Energy and Public Utilities
- Judiciary
- Redistricting

=== 2017-2018 session ===
- Appropriations
- Appropriations - Agriculture and Natural and Economic Resources
- Environment (Vice Chair)
- Elections and Ethics Law
- Energy and Public Utilities
- Judiciary II
- Alcoholic Beverage Control
- Regulatory Reform

=== 2015-2016 session ===
- Appropriations
- Appropriations - Agriculture and Natural and Economic Resources
- Environment (Vice Chair)
- Judiciary III (Vice Chair)
- Elections
- Public Utilities
- Regulatory Reform

=== 2013-2014 session ===
- Appropriations
- Environment
- Elections
- Public Utilities
- Judiciary

=== 2011-2012 session ===
- Appropriations
- Environment
- Elections
- Public Utilities
- Judiciary

=== 2009-2010 session ===
- Appropriations
- Environment and Natural Resources
- Election Law and Campaign Finance Reform
- Public Utilities
- Energy and Energy Efficiency
- Judiciary I
- Marine Resources and Aquaculture
- Ethics

== Electoral history ==
=== 2024 ===
North Carolina House of Representatives 61st district general election, 2024
Party	Candidate	Votes	%
Democratic	Pricey Harrison (incumbent)	33,804	78.87%
Republican	Crystal Davis	9,058	21.13%
Total votes		42,862	100%
Democratic hold			

=== 2022 ===
North Carolina House of Representatives 61st district general election, 2022
Party	Candidate	Votes	%
Democratic	Pricey Harrison (incumbent)	19,862	100%
Total votes		19,862	100%
Democratic hold			

=== 2020 ===
North Carolina House of Representatives 61st district general election, 2020
Party	Candidate	Votes	%
Democratic	Pricey Harrison (incumbent)	33,983	100%
Total votes		33,983	100%
Democratic hold			

=== 2018 ===
North Carolina House of Representatives 61st district general election, 2018
Party	Candidate	Votes	%
Democratic	Pricey Harrison (incumbent)	25,469	73.30%
Republican	Alissa Batts	9,275	26.70%
Total votes		34,744	100%
Democratic hold			

=== 2016 ===
North Carolina House of Representatives 57th district general election, 2016
Party	Candidate	Votes	%
Democratic	Pricey Harrison (incumbent)	31,518	100%
Total votes		31,518	100%
Democratic hold			

=== 2014 ===
North Carolina House of Representatives 57th district Democratic primary election, 2014
Party	Candidate	Votes	%
Democratic	Pricey Harrison (incumbent)	3,837	68.55%
Democratic	Jim Kee	1,760	31.45%
Total votes		5,597	100%

North Carolina House of Representatives 57th district general election, 2014
Party	Candidate	Votes	%
Democratic	Pricey Harrison (incumbent)	17,577	100%
Total votes		17,577	100%
Democratic hold			

=== 2012 ===
North Carolina House of Representatives 57th district general election, 2012
Party	Candidate	Votes	%
Democratic	Pricey Harrison (incumbent)	32,020	100%
Total votes		32,020	100%
Democratic hold			

=== 2010 ===
North Carolina House of Representatives 57th district general election, 2010
Party	Candidate	Votes	%
Democratic	Pricey Harrison (incumbent)	10,664	55.69%
Republican	Jon Hardister	8,485	44.31%
Total votes		19,149	100%
Democratic hold			

=== 2008 ===
North Carolina House of Representatives 57th district general election, 2008
Party	Candidate	Votes	%
Democratic	Pricey Harrison (incumbent)	25,769	100%
Total votes		25,769	100%
Democratic hold			

=== 2006 ===
North Carolina House of Representatives 57th district general election, 2006
Party	Candidate	Votes	%
Democratic	Pricey Harrison (incumbent)	9,897	63.05%
Republican	Ron Styers	5,799	36.95%
Total votes		15,696	100%
Democratic hold			

=== 2004 ===
North Carolina House of Representatives 57th district general election, 2004
Party	Candidate	Votes	%
Democratic	Pricey Harrison	16,606	56.65%
Republican	Joanne Bowie (incumbent)	12,707	43.35%
Total votes		29,313	100%
Democratic gain from Republican			

North Carolina House of Representatives
Preceded by Joanne Bowie	Member of the North Carolina House of Representatives from the 57th district 2005–2019	Succeeded by Ashton Clemmons
Preceded by John Faircloth	Member of the North Carolina House of Representatives from the 61st district 2019–present	Incumbent
