= Mitchell S. Setzer =

American politician

Mitchell Setzer
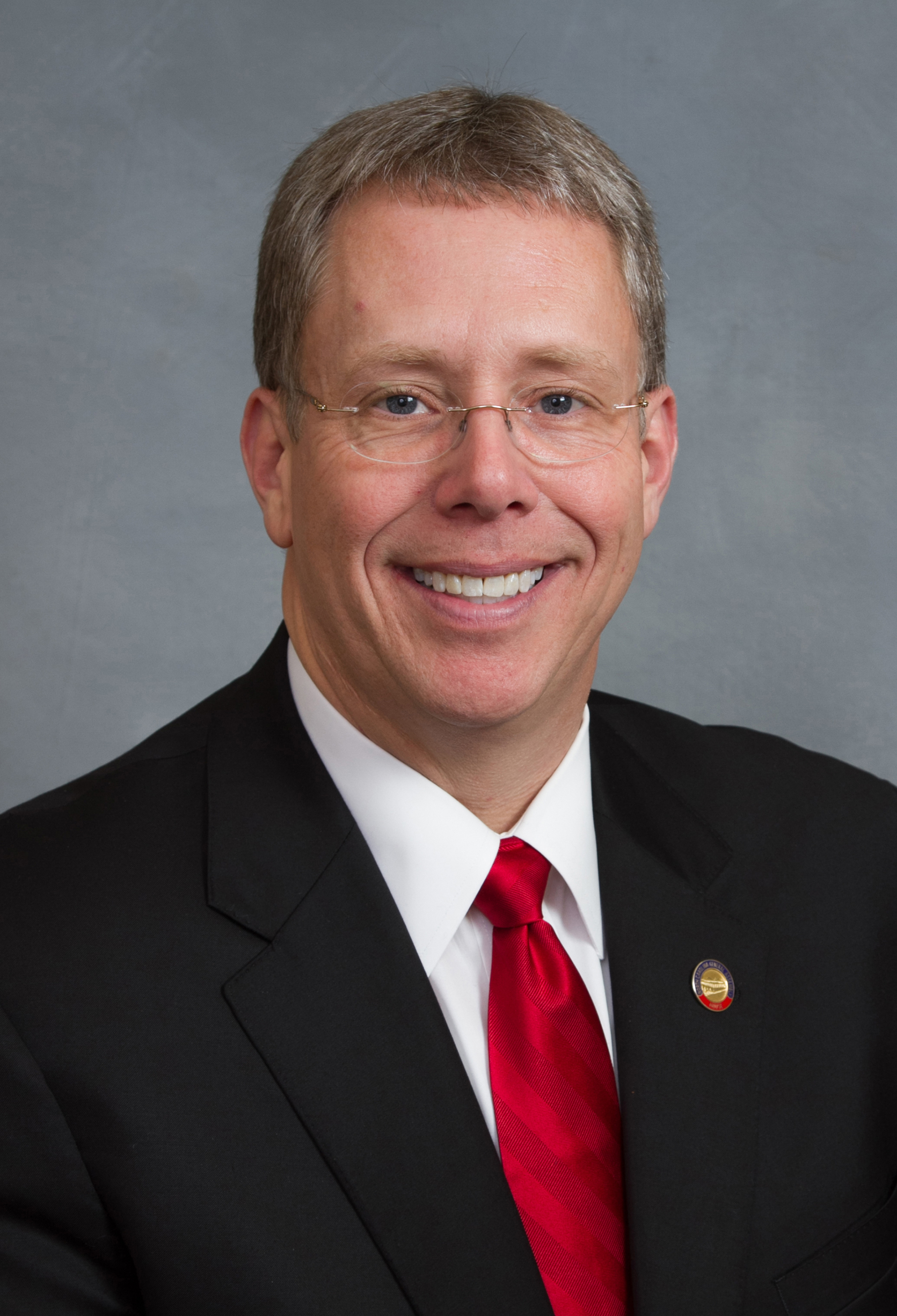

Speaker pro tempore of the North Carolina House of Representatives
- Incumbent
- Assumed office January 8, 2025
- Preceded by: Sarah Stevens

Member of the North Carolina House of Representatives
- Incumbent
- Assumed office January 1, 1999
- Preceded by: Robert Brawley
- Constituency: 43rd district (1999–2003); 89th district (2003–present)

Personal details
- Born: Mitchell Smith Setzer; March 12, 1965 (age 61) Catawba, North Carolina, U.S.
- Party: Republican
- Education: Lees-McRae College (attended); University of North Carolina, Greensboro (BA)
- Website: State House website

Mitchell Smith Setzer (born March 12th, 1965) is a Republican member of the North Carolina General Assembly representing the state's eighty-ninth House district, including constituents in Catawba county. Setzer was born in and resides in Catawba, North Carolina. A sales professional, and executive vice president of his family's company, Smith Setzer and Son, a pipe company based out of the town of Catawba, he is currently serving in the North Carolina State House.

== Committee assignments ==
=== 2025–2026 Session ===
- Energy and Public Utilities
- Ethics
- Finance
- Select Committee on Helene Recovery
- Insurance

=== 2023–2024 Session ===
- Energy and Public Utilities
- Ethics (Vice Chair)
- Finance (Senior Chair)
- Health
- Insurance (Chair)
- Local Government
- UNC BOG Nominations

=== 2021–2022 Session ===
- Insurance (Chair)
- Finance (Senior Chair)
- Ethics (Vice Chair)
- Energy and Public Utilities
- Local Government
- Health
- UNC Board of Governors Nominations

=== 2019–2020 Session ===
- Insurance (Chair)
- Finance (Senior Chair)
- Ethics (Vice Chair)
- Energy and Public Utilities
- State and Local Government
- Health

=== 2017–2018 Session ===
- Appropriations
- Appropriations - Justice and Public Safety
- Insurance (Chair)
- Finance (Chair)
- Ethics
- Health
- State and Local Government II
- Banking
- Judiciary IV

=== 2015–2016 Session ===
- Insurance (Chair)
- Finance (Chair)
- Ethics
- Health
- Local Government
- Judiciary IV
- Aging

=== 2013–2014 Session ===
- Finance (Vice Chair)
- Ethics (Vice Chair)
- Government
- Banking
- Commerce and Job Development

=== 2011–2012 Session ===
- Finance (Chair)
- Insurance (Vice Chair)
- Ethics
- Government
- Banking
- Commerce and Job Development
- Public Utilities

=== 2009–2010 Session ===
- Insurance
- Ethics
- Finance
- Financial Institutions
- Rules

== Electoral history ==
=== 2024 ===
North Carolina House of Representatives 89th district general election, 2024
Party	Candidate	Votes	%
Republican	Mitchell Setzer (incumbent)	38,122	75.99%
Democratic	Greg Cranford	12,044	24.01%
Total votes		50,166	100%
Republican hold			

=== 2022 ===
North Carolina House of Representatives 89th district Republican primary election, 2022
Party	Candidate	Votes	%
Republican	Mitchell Setzer (incumbent)	5,516	57.19%
Republican	Kelli Weaver Moore	3,016	31.27%
Republican	Benjamin Devine	1,113	11.54%
Total votes		9,645	100%

North Carolina House of Representatives 89th district general election, 2022
Party	Candidate	Votes	%
Republican	Mitchell Setzer (incumbent)	27,255	100%
Total votes		27,255	100%
Republican hold			

=== 2020 ===
North Carolina House of Representatives 89th district general election, 2020
Party	Candidate	Votes	%
Republican	Mitchell Setzer (incumbent)	31,044	74.35%
Democratic	Greg Cranford	10,711	25.65%
Total votes		41,755	100%
Republican hold			

=== 2018 ===
North Carolina House of Representatives 89th district general election, 2018
Party	Candidate	Votes	%
Republican	Mitchell Setzer (incumbent)	18,959	72.25%
Democratic	Greg Cranford	7,281	27.75%
Total votes		26,240	100%
Republican hold			

=== 2016 ===
North Carolina House of Representatives 89th district general election, 2016
Party	Candidate	Votes	%
Republican	Mitchell Setzer (incumbent)	28,409	100%
Total votes		28,409	100%
Republican hold			

=== 2014 ===
North Carolina House of Representatives 89th district general election, 2014
Party	Candidate	Votes	%
Republican	Mitchell Setzer (incumbent)	16,616	100%
Total votes		16,616	100%
Republican hold			

=== 2012 ===
North Carolina House of Representatives 89th district general election, 2012
Party	Candidate	Votes	%
Republican	Mitchell Setzer (incumbent)	25,735	100%
Total votes		25,735	100%
Republican hold			

=== 2010 ===
North Carolina House of Representatives 89th district general election, 2010
Party	Candidate	Votes	%
Republican	Mitchell Setzer (incumbent)	16,119	100%
Total votes		16,119	100%
Republican hold			

=== 2008 ===
North Carolina House of Representatives 89th district general election, 2008
Party	Candidate	Votes	%
Republican	Mitchell Setzer (incumbent)	25,176	100%
Total votes		25,176	100%
Republican hold			

=== 2006 ===
North Carolina House of Representatives 89th district general election, 2006
Party	Candidate	Votes	%
Republican	Mitchell Setzer (incumbent)	11,301	100%
Total votes		11,301	100%
Republican hold			

=== 2004 ===
North Carolina House of Representatives 89th district general election, 2004
Party	Candidate	Votes	%
Republican	Mitchell Setzer (incumbent)	20,460	100%
Total votes		20,460	100%
Republican hold			

=== 2002 ===
North Carolina House of Representatives 89th district general election, 2002
Party	Candidate	Votes	%
Republican	Mitchell Setzer (incumbent)	12,912	85.97%
Libertarian	Barry Woodfin	2,107	14.03%
Total votes		15,019	100%
Republican hold			

=== 2000 ===
North Carolina House of Representatives 43rd district general election, 2000
Party	Candidate	Votes	%
Republican	Mitchell Setzer (incumbent)	23,886	100%
Total votes		23,886	100%
Republican hold			

North Carolina House of Representatives
Preceded by Sarah Stevens	Speaker pro tempore of the North Carolina House of Representatives; 2025–present	Incumbent
