= North Carolina's 61st House district =

American legislative district

North Carolina's 61st State House of Representatives district
Representative
Pricey Harrison; D–Greensboro
- Demographics: 43% White; 40% Black; 10% Hispanic; 2% Asian; 4% Multiracial
- Population (2024): 91,515

North Carolina's 61st House district is one of 120 districts in the North Carolina House of Representatives. It has been represented by Democrat Pricey Harrison since 2019.

== Geography ==
Since 2003, the district has included part of Guilford County. The district overlaps with the 27th and 28th Senate districts.

== District officeholders ==
Representative	Party	Dates	Notes	Counties
District created January 1, 1985.
Casper Holroyd (Raleigh)	Democratic	January 1, 1985 – January 1, 1989		1985–2003; Part of Wake County.
Art Pope (Raleigh)	Republican	January 1, 1989 – January 1, 1993	Retired to run for Lieutenant Governor.	1985–2003; Part of Wake County.
Brad Miller (Raleigh)	Democratic	January 1, 1993 – January 1, 1995	Lost re-election.	1985–2003; Part of Wake County.
Chuck Neely (Raleigh)	Republican	January 1, 1995 – April 7, 1999	Resigned.	1985–2003; Part of Wake County.
Vacant		April 7, 1999 – April 13, 1999		1985–2003; Part of Wake County.
Art Pope (Raleigh)	Republican	April 13, 1999 – January 1, 2003	Appointed to finish Neely's term. Redistricted to the 34th district and retired.	1985–2003; Part of Wake County.
Steve Wood (High Point)	Republican	January 1, 2003 – January 1, 2005	Lost re-nomination.	2003–Present; Parts of Guilford County.
Laura Wiley (High Point)	Republican	January 1, 2005 – January 1, 2011	Retired.	2003–Present; Parts of Guilford County.
John Faircloth (High Point)	Republican	January 1, 2011 – January 1, 2019	Redistricted to the 62nd district.	2003–Present; Parts of Guilford County.
Pricey Harrison (Greensboro)	Democratic	January 1, 2019 – Present	Redistricted from the 57th district.	2003–Present; Parts of Guilford County.

== Election results ==
=== 2024 ===
North Carolina House of Representatives 61st district general election, 2024
Party	Candidate	Votes	%
Democratic	Pricey Harrison (incumbent)	33,804	78.87%
Republican	Crystal Davis	9,058	21.13%
Total votes		42,862	100%
Democratic hold			

=== 2022 ===
North Carolina House of Representatives 61st district general election, 2022
Party	Candidate	Votes	%
Democratic	Pricey Harrison (incumbent)	19,862	100%
Total votes		19,862	100%
Democratic hold			

=== 2020 ===
North Carolina House of Representatives 61st district general election, 2020
Party	Candidate	Votes	%
Democratic	Pricey Harrison (incumbent)	33,983	100%
Total votes		33,983	100%
Democratic hold			

=== 2018 ===
North Carolina House of Representatives 61st district general election, 2018
Party	Candidate	Votes	%
Democratic	Pricey Harrison (incumbent)	25,469	73.30%
Republican	Alissa Batts	9,275	26.70%
Total votes		34,744	100%
Democratic hold			

=== 2016 ===
North Carolina House of Representatives 61st district general election, 2016
Party	Candidate	Votes	%
Republican	John Faircloth (incumbent)	31,767	100%
Total votes		31,767	100%
Republican hold			

=== 2014 ===
North Carolina House of Representatives 61st district general election, 2014
Party	Candidate	Votes	%
Republican	John Faircloth (incumbent)	19,030	67.17%
Democratic	Ron Weatherford	9,303	32.83%
Total votes		28,333	100%
Republican hold			

=== 2012 ===
North Carolina House of Representatives 61st district general election, 2012
Party	Candidate	Votes	%
Republican	John Faircloth (incumbent)	26,465	63.84%
Democratic	Ron Weatherford	14,988	36.16%
Total votes		41,453	100%
Republican hold			

=== 2010 ===
North Carolina House of Representatives 61st district Republican primary election, 2010
Party	Candidate	Votes	%
Republican	John Faircloth	1,783	42.60%
Republican	Paul Norcross	1,050	25.09%
Republican	Georgia Nixon-Roney	716	17.11%
Republican	Gerald T. Grubb	636	15.20%
Total votes		4,185	100%

North Carolina House of Representatives 61st district general election, 2010
Party	Candidate	Votes	%
Republican	John Faircloth	18,035	100%
Total votes		18,035	100%
Republican hold			

=== 2008 ===
North Carolina House of Representative 61st district Republican primary election, 2008
Party	Candidate	Votes	%
Republican	Laura Wiley (incumbent)	3,702	51.80%
Republican	George Ragsdale	3,445	48.20%
Total votes		7,147	100%

North Carolina House of Representatives 61st district general election, 2008
Party	Candidate	Votes	%
Republican	Laura Wiley (incumbent)	26,777	100%
Total votes		26,777	100%
Republican hold			

=== 2006 ===
North Carolina House of Representatives 61st district general election, 2006
Party	Candidate	Votes	%
Republican	Laura Wiley (incumbent)	12,342	100%
Total votes		12,342	100%
Republican hold			

=== 2004 ===
North Carolina House of Representative 61st district Republican primary election, 2004
Party	Candidate	Votes	%
Republican	Laura Wiley	2,515	51.48%
Republican	Steve Wood (incumbent)	2,370	48.52%
Total votes		4,885	100%

North Carolina House of Representatives 61st district general election, 2004
Party	Candidate	Votes	%
Republican	Laura Wiley	25,490	100%
Total votes		25,490	100%
Republican hold			

=== 2002 ===
North Carolina House of Representative 61st district Republican primary election, 2002
Party	Candidate	Votes	%
Republican	Steve Wood	1,522	32.99%
Republican	M. Christopher Whitley	1,230	26.66%
Republican	Robert L. "Bob" Fowler	1,101	23.87%
Republican	Sam Spagnola	760	16.48%
Total votes		4,613	100%

North Carolina House of Representative 61st district general election, 2002
Party	Candidate	Votes	%
Republican	Steve Wood	16,769	79.16%
Libertarian	Jennifer Schulz Medlock	4,415	20.84%
Total votes		21,184	100%
Republican gain from Democratic			

=== 2000 ===
North Carolina House of Representatives 61st district general election, 2000
Party	Candidate	Votes	%
Republican	Art Pope (incumbent)	14,810	50.98%
Democratic	Jack Nichols	14,243	49.02%
Total votes		29,053	100%
Republican hold			
