= Robert T. Reives II =

American politician

Robert Reives
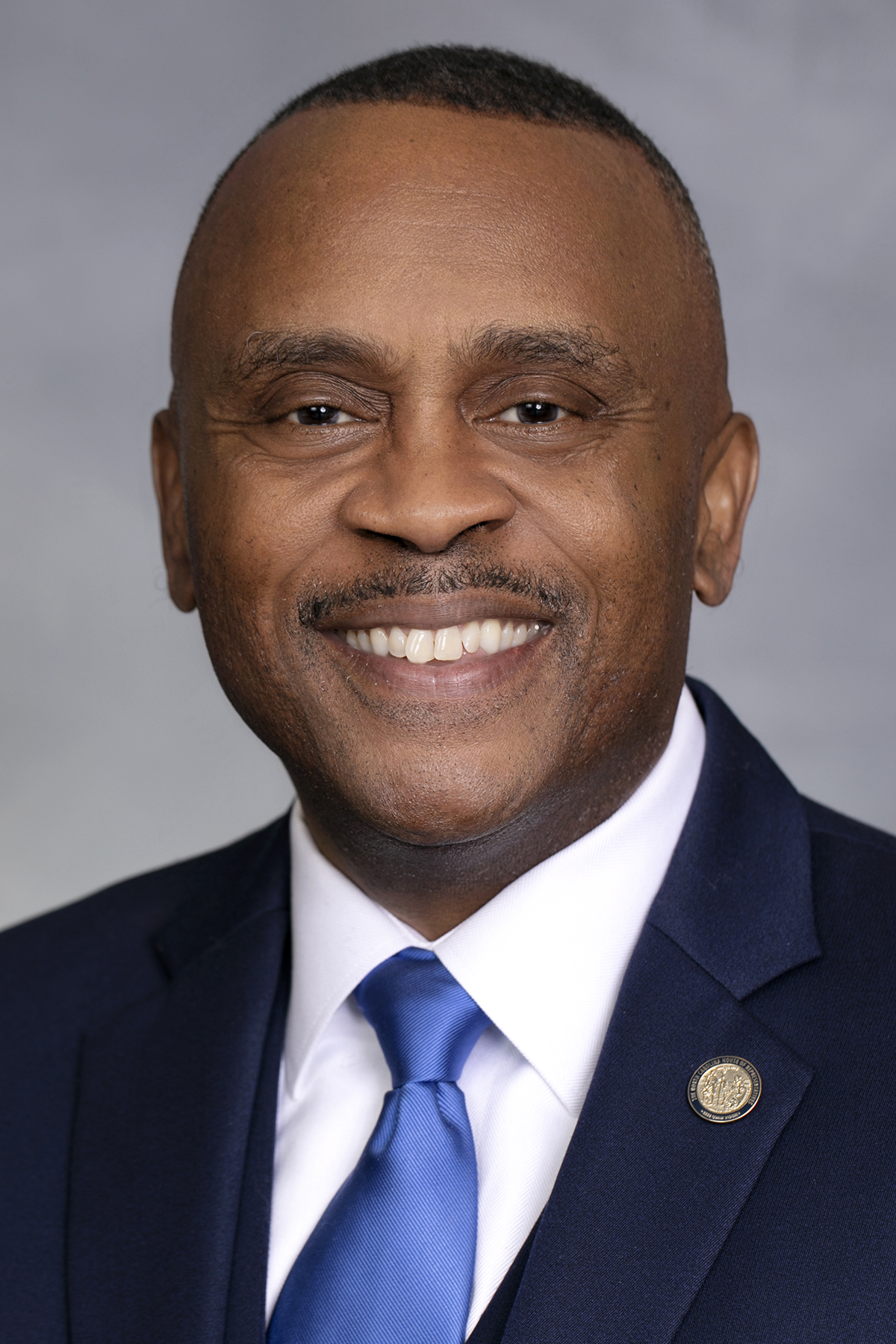
- Official portrait, 2023

Minority Leader of the North Carolina House of Representatives
- Incumbent
- Assumed office January 1, 2021
- Preceded by: Darren Jackson

Member of the North Carolina House of Representatives from the 54th district
- Incumbent
- Assumed office January 29, 2014
- Preceded by: Deb McManus

Personal details
- Born: Robert Tyrone Reives II; September 24, 1970 (age 56)
- Party: Democratic
- Spouse: Cynthia
- Children: 2
- Education: University of North Carolina, Chapel Hill (BS, JD)
- Website: State House website

Robert Tyrone Reives II (born September 24, 1970) is an American politician and attorney from North Carolina. Reives was first appointed to the North Carolina House of Representatives in January 2014 and he has subsequently been re-elected seven times, most recently in 2026.

As a Democrat, he represents the 54th district, which includes all of Chatham County and parts of Randolph County (formerly all of Chatham County and part of Lee County or Durham County).

In December 2020, Reives was elected by his peers as the House Democratic leader. Due to his party gaining a majority in the House in the 2026 election, Reives is widely expected to become the next Speaker of the North Carolina House of Representatives.

== Early life ==
Robert Reives grew up and attended schools in Sanford, North Carolina. He attended Lee County High School where he was a member of student government and was also a part of the marching band. He graduated in the class of 1988 and went on to attend undergrad at the University of North Carolina at Chapel Hill. He graduated in the class of 1992 and went on to get his Juris Doctor from the University of North Carolina at Chapel Hill School of Law in 1995.

== Committee assignments ==
=== 2023–2024 Session ===
- Appropriations
- Appropriations - Justice and Public Safety
- Federal Relations and American Indian Affairs
- Marine Resources and Aquaculture
- Redistricting
- Rules, Calendar, and Operations of the House

=== 2021–2022 Session ===
- Appropriations
- Appropriations - Justice and Public Safety
- Agriculture
- Judiciary II
- Redistricting
- Rules, Calendar, and Operations of the House

=== 2019–2020 Session ===
- Appropriations
- Appropriations - Justice and Public Safety
- Agriculture
- Judiciary
- Redistricting
- Rules, Calendar, and Operations of the House
- Education - Community Colleges

=== 2017–2018 Session ===
- Agriculture
- Judiciary III (Vice Chair)
- Rules, Calendar, and Operations of the House
- Education - Community Colleges (Vice Chair)
- Finance

=== 2015–2016 Session ===
- Agriculture
- Judiciary II
- Rules, Calendar, and Operations of the House
- Education - Community Colleges (Vice-Chair)
- Finance
- Homeland Security, Military, and Veterans Affairs

== Electoral history ==
=== 2024 ===
North Carolina House of Representatives 54th district general election, 2024
Party	Candidate	Votes	%
Democratic	Robert Reives (incumbent)	29,910	54.76%
Republican	Joe Godfrey	24,714	45.24%
Total votes		54,624	100%
Democratic hold			

=== 2022 ===
North Carolina House of Representatives 54th district general election, 2022
Party	Candidate	Votes	%
Democratic	Robert Reives (incumbent)	23,105	55.29%
Republican	Walter Petty	18,684	44.71%
Total votes		41,789	100%
Democratic hold			

=== 2020 ===
North Carolina House of Representatives 54th district general election, 2020
Party	Candidate	Votes	%
Democratic	Robert Reives (incumbent)	37,825	61.22%
Republican	George T. Gilson Jr.	23,957	38.78%
Total votes		61,782	100%
Democratic hold			

=== 2018 ===
North Carolina House of Representatives 54th district general election, 2018
Party	Candidate	Votes	%
Democratic	Robert Reives (incumbent)	29,664	63.27%
Republican	Jay Stobbs	17,219	36.73%
Total votes		46,883	100%
Democratic hold			

=== 2016 ===
North Carolina House of Representatives 54th district general election, 2016
Party	Candidate	Votes	%
Democratic	Robert Reives (incumbent)	24,773	57.20%
Republican	Wesley Seawell	18,534	42.80%
Total votes		43,307	100%
Democratic hold			

=== 2014 ===
North Carolina House of Representatives 54th district Democratic primary election, 2014
Party	Candidate	Votes	%
Democratic	Robert Reives (incumbent)	5,739	68.35%
Democratic	Barry E. Burns	2,657	31.65%
Total votes		8,396	100%

North Carolina House of Representatives 54th district general election, 2014
Party	Candidate	Votes	%
Democratic	Robert Reives (incumbent)	16,875	56.19%
Republican	Andy Wilkie	13,156	43.81%
Total votes		30,031	100%
Democratic hold			

North Carolina House of Representatives
Preceded by Darren Jackson	Minority Leader of the North Carolina House of Representatives; 2021–present	Incumbent
