= 2014 North Carolina House of Representatives election =

- November 4, 2014

All 120 seats in the North Carolina House of Representatives 61 seats needed for a majority
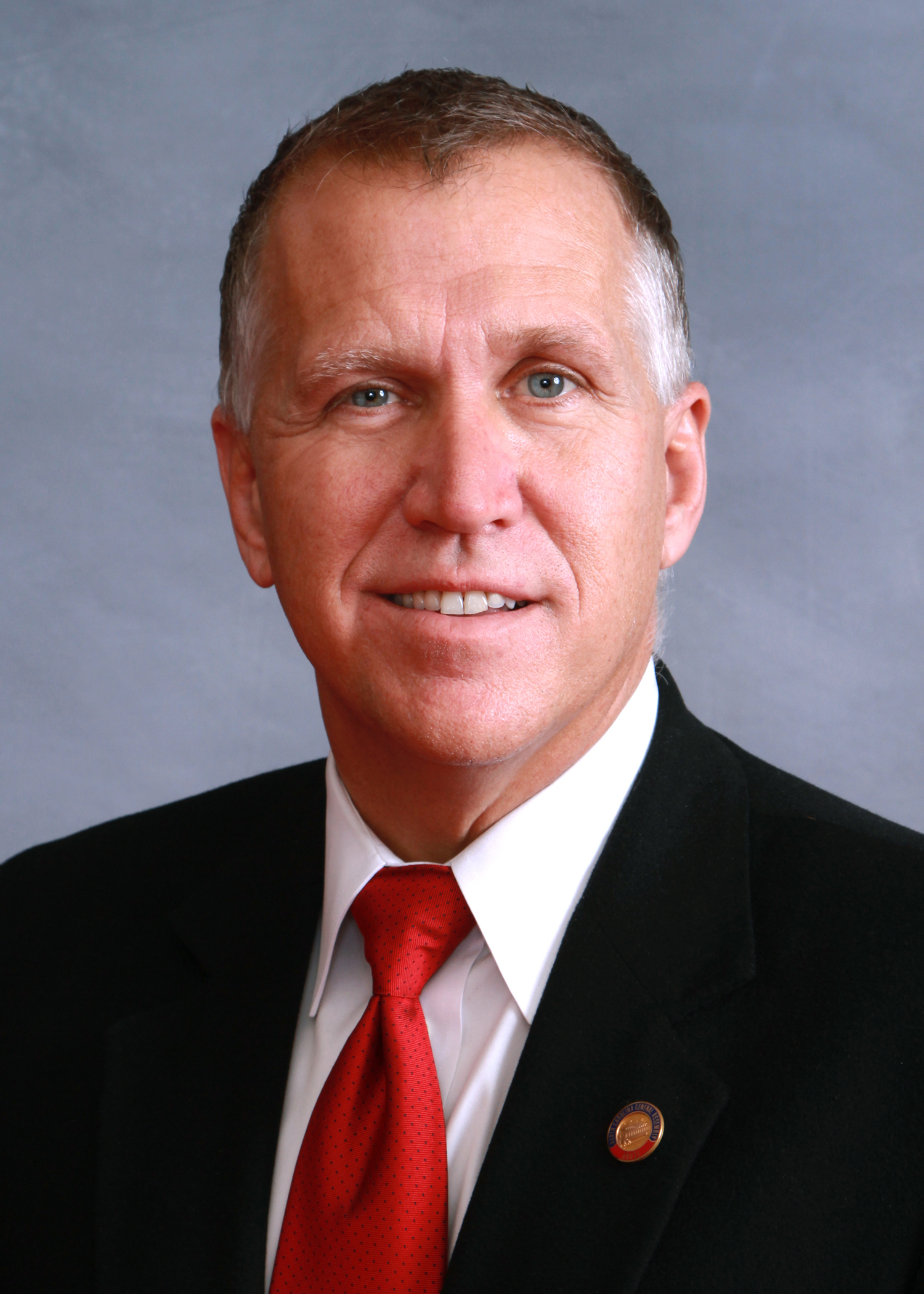

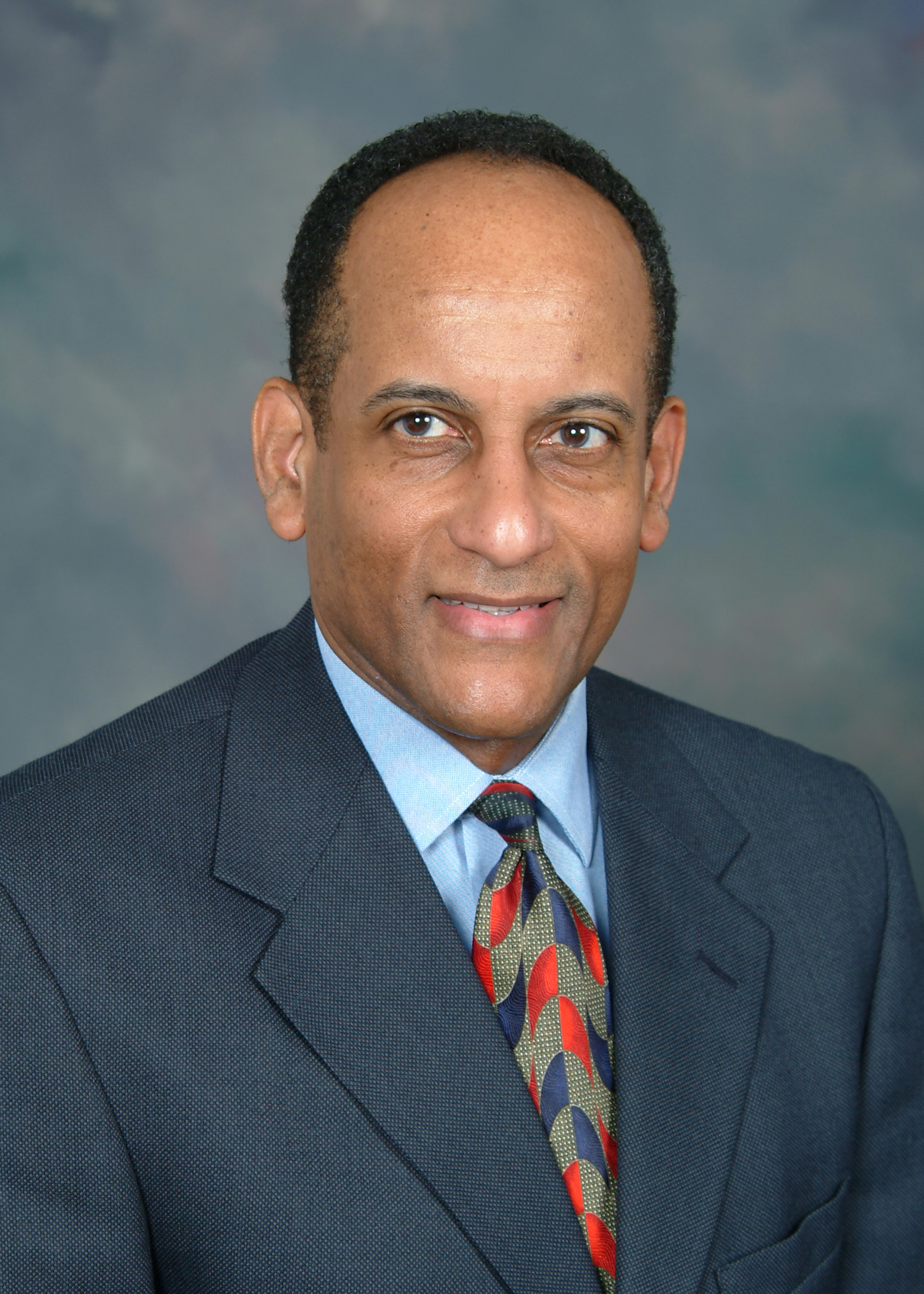
	Majority party	Minority party
Leader	Thom Tillis (retired)	Larry Hall
Party	Republican	Democratic
Leader since	January 26, 2011	January 1, 2013
Leader's seat	98th - Cornelius	29th - Durham
Last election	77	43
Seats won	74	46
Seat change	▼3	▲3
- Results: Democratic hold Democratic gain Republican hold Republican gain
Speaker before election
Thom Tillis
Republican
Elected Speaker
Tim Moore
Republican

An election was held on November 4, 2014, to elect all 120 members to North Carolina's House of Representatives. The election coincided with elections for other offices, including U.S. Senate, U.S. House of Representatives, and state senate. The primary election was held on May 6, 2014.

== Results summary ==
District	Incumbent	Party	Elected	Party
1st	Bob Steinburg	Rep	Bob Steinburg	Rep
2nd	Winkie Wilkins†	Dem	Larry Yarborough	Rep
3rd	Michael Speciale	Rep	Michael Speciale	Rep
4th	Jimmy Dixon	Rep	Jimmy Dixon	Rep
5th	Annie Mobley	Dem	Howard Hunter III	Dem
6th	Paul Tine	Dem	Paul Tine	Dem
7th	Bobbie Richardson	Dem	Bobbie Richardson	Dem
8th	Susan Martin	Rep	Susan Martin	Rep
9th	Brian Brown	Rep	Brian Brown	Rep
10th	John Bell	Rep	John Bell	Rep
11th	Duane Hall	Dem	Duane Hall	Dem
12th	George Graham	Dem	George Graham	Dem
13th	Pat McElraft	Rep	Pat McElraft	Rep
14th	George Cleveland	Rep	George Cleveland	Rep
15th	Phil Shepard	Rep	Phil Shepard	Rep
16th	Chris Millis	Rep	Chris Millis	Rep
17th	Frank Iler	Rep	Frank Iler	Rep
18th	Susi Hamilton	Dem	Susi Hamilton	Dem
19th	Ted Davis Jr.	Rep	Ted Davis Jr.	Rep
20th	Rick Catlin	Rep	Rick Catlin	Rep
21st	Larry Bell	Dem	Larry Bell	Dem
22nd	William Brisson	Dem	William Brisson	Dem
23rd	Joe Tolson†	Dem	Shelly Willingham	Dem
24th	Jean Farmer-Butterfield	Dem	Jean Farmer-Butterfield	Dem
25th	Jeff Collins	Rep	Jeff Collins	Rep
26th	Leo Daughtry	Rep	Leo Daughtry	Rep
27th	Michael Wray	Dem	Michael Wray	Dem
28th	James Langdon Jr.	Rep	James Langdon Jr.	Rep
29th	Larry Hall	Dem	Larry Hall	Dem
30th	Paul Luebke	Dem	Paul Luebke	Dem
31st	Mickey Michaux	Dem	Mickey Michaux	Dem
32nd	Nathan Baskerville	Dem	Nathan Baskerville	Dem
33rd	Rosa Gill	Dem	Rosa Gill	Dem
34th	Grier Martin	Dem	Grier Martin	Dem
35th	Chris Malone	Rep	Chris Malone	Rep
36th	Nelson Dollar	Rep	Nelson Dollar	Rep
37th	Paul Stam	Rep	Paul Stam	Rep
38th	Yvonne Lewis Holley	Dem	Yvonne Lewis Holley	Dem
39th	Darren Jackson	Dem	Darren Jackson	Dem
40th	Marilyn Avila	Rep	Marilyn Avila	Rep
41st	Tom Murry	Rep	Gale Adcock	Dem
42nd	Marvin Lucas	Dem	Marvin Lucas	Dem
43rd	Elmer Floyd	Dem	Elmer Floyd	Dem
44th	Rick Glazier	Dem	Rick Glazier	Dem
45th	John Szoka	Rep	John Szoka	Rep
46th	Ken Waddell	Dem	Ken Waddell	Dem
47th	Charles Graham	Dem	Charles Graham	Dem
48th	Garland Pierce	Dem	Garland Pierce	Dem
49th	Gary Pendleton	Rep	Gary Pendleton	Rep
50th	Graig Meyer	Dem	Graig Meyer	Dem
51st	Mike Stone	Rep	Brad Salmon	Dem
52nd	Jamie Boles	Rep	Jamie Boles	Rep
53rd	David Lewis	Rep	David Lewis	Rep
54th	Robert Reives	Dem	Robert Reives	Dem
55th	Mark Brody	Rep	Mark Brody	Rep
56th	Verla Insko	Dem	Verla Insko	Dem
57th	Pricey Harrison	Dem	Pricey Harrison	Dem
58th	Alma Adams†	Dem	Ralph Johnson	Dem
59th	Jon Hardister	Rep	Jon Hardister	Rep
60th	Marcus Brandon†	Dem	Cecil Brockman	Dem
61st	John Faircloth	Rep	John Faircloth	Rep
62nd	John Blust	Rep	John Blust	Rep
63rd	Stephen Ross	Rep	Stephen Ross	Rep
64th	Dennis Riddell	Rep	Dennis Riddell	Rep
65th	Bert Jones	Rep	Bert Jones	Rep
66th	Ken Goodman	Dem	Ken Goodman	Dem
67th	Justin Burr	Rep	Justin Burr	Rep
68th	Craig Horn	Rep	Craig Horn	Rep
69th	Dean Arp	Rep	Dean Arp	Rep
70th	Pat Hurley	Rep	Pat Hurley	Rep
71st	Evelyn Terry	Dem	Evelyn Terry	Dem
72nd	Ed Hanes	Dem	Ed Hanes	Dem
73rd	Mark Hollo†	Rep	Lee Zachary	Rep
74th	Debra Conrad	Rep	Debra Conrad	Rep
75th	Donny Lambeth	Rep	Donny Lambeth	Rep
76th	Carl Ford	Rep	Carl Ford	Rep
77th	Harry Warren	Rep	Harry Warren	Rep
78th	Allen McNeill	Rep	Allen McNeill	Rep
79th	Julia Craven Howard	Rep	Julia Craven Howard	Rep
80th	Roger Younts	Rep	Sam Watford	Rep
81st	Rayne Brown	Rep	Rayne Brown	Rep
82nd	Larry Pittman	Rep	Larry Pittman	Rep
83rd	Linda Johnson	Rep	Linda Johnson	Rep
84th	Rena Turner	Rep	Rena Turner	Rep
85th	Josh Dobson	Rep	Josh Dobson	Rep
86th	Hugh Blackwell	Rep	Hugh Blackwell	Rep
87th	Edgar Starnes	Rep	Edgar Starnes	Rep
88th	Rob Bryan	Rep	Rob Bryan	Rep
89th	Mitchell Setzer	Rep	Mitchell Setzer	Rep
90th	Sarah Stevens	Rep	Sarah Stevens	Rep
91st	Bryan Holloway	Rep	Bryan Holloway	Rep
92nd	Charles Jeter	Rep	Charles Jeter	Rep
93rd	Jonathan Jordan	Rep	Jonathan Jordan	Rep
94th	Jeffrey Elmore	Rep	Jeffrey Elmore	Rep
95th	Robert Brawley	Rep	John Fraley	Rep
96th	Andy Wells†	Rep	Jay Adams	Rep
97th	Jason Saine	Rep	Jason Saine	Rep
98th	Thom Tillis†	Rep	John Bradford	Rep
99th	Rodney Moore	Dem	Rodney Moore	Dem
100th	Tricia Cotham	Dem	Tricia Cotham	Dem
101st	Beverly Earle	Dem	Beverly Earle	Dem
102nd	Becky Carney	Dem	Becky Carney	Dem
103rd	Bill Brawley	Rep	Bill Brawley	Rep
104th	Ruth Samuelson†	Rep	Dan Bishop	Rep
105th	Jacqueline Schaffer	Rep	Jacqueline Schaffer	Rep
106th	Carla Cunningham	Dem	Carla Cunningham	Dem
107th	Kelly Alexander	Dem	Kelly Alexander	Dem
108th	John Torbett	Rep	John Torbett	Rep
109th	Dana Bumgardner	Rep	Dana Bumgardner	Rep
110th	Kelly Hastings	Rep	Kelly Hastings	Rep
111th	Tim Moore	Rep	Tim Moore	Rep
112th	Mike Hager	Rep	Mike Hager	Rep
113th	Chris Whitmire	Rep	Chris Whitmire	Rep
114th	Susan Fisher	Dem	Susan Fisher	Dem
115th	Nathan Ramsey	Rep	John Ager	Dem
116th	Tim Moffitt	Rep	Brian Turner	Dem
117th	Chuck McGrady	Rep	Chuck McGrady	Rep
118th	Michele Presnell	Rep	Michele Presnell	Rep
119th	Joe Sam Queen	Dem	Joe Sam Queen	Dem
120th	Roger West	Rep	Roger West	Rep

† - Incumbent not seeking re-election

=== Incumbents defeated in primary election ===
- Robert Brawley (R-District 95), defeated by John Fraley (R)

=== Incumbents defeated in general election ===
- Tom Murry (R-District 41), defeated by Gale Adcock (D)
- Mike Stone (R-District 51), defeated by Brad Salmon (D)
- Nathan Ramsey (R-District 115), defeated by John Ager (D)
- Tim Moffitt (R-District 116), defeated by Brian Turner (D)

=== Open seats that changed parties ===
- Winkie Wilkins (D-District 2) didn't seek re-election, seat won by Larry Yarborough (R)

== Predictions ==
Source	Ranking	As of
Governing	Likely R	October 20, 2014

== Detailed results ==
=== Districts 1-19 ===
==== District 1 ====
Incumbent Republican Bob Steinburg has represented the 1st District since 2013.

North Carolina House of Representatives 1st district general election, 2014
Party	Candidate	Votes	%
Republican	Bob Steinburg (incumbent)	15,713	60.91%
Democratic	Garry W. Meiggs	10,082	39.09%
Total votes		25,795	100%
Republican hold			

==== District 2 ====
Incumbent Democrat Winkie Wilkins has represented the 2nd district and its predecessors since 2005. Winkins didn't seek re-election and was succeeded by Republican Larry Yarborough.

North Carolina House of Representatives 2nd district general election, 2014
Party	Candidate	Votes	%
Republican	Larry Yarborough	13,423	56.68%
Democratic	Ray Jeffers	10,259	43.32%
Total votes		23,682	100%
Republican gain from Democratic			

==== District 3 ====
Incumbent Republican Michael Speciale has represented the 3rd district since 2013.

North Carolina House of Representatives 3rd district general election, 2014
Party	Candidate	Votes	%
Republican	Michael Speciale (incumbent)	14,584	58.09%
Democratic	Whit Whitley	10,524	41.91%
Total votes		25,108	100%
Republican hold			

==== District 4 ====
Incumbent Republican Jimmy Dixon has represented the 4th district since 2011.

North Carolina House of Representatives 4th district general election, 2014
Party	Candidate	Votes	%
Republican	Jimmy Dixon (incumbent)	15,933	100%
Total votes		15,933	100%
Republican hold			

==== District 5 ====
Incumbent Democrat Annie Mobley has represented the 5th district since 2007. Mobley lost re-nomination to fellow Democrat Howard Hunter III.

North Carolina House of Representatives 5th district general election, 2014
Party	Candidate	Votes	%
Democratic	Howard Hunter III	14,430	68.55%
Republican	Sidney Pierce III	6,620	31.45%
Total votes		21,050	100%
Democratic hold			

==== District 6 ====
Incumbent Democrat Paul Tine has represented the 6th district since 2013.

North Carolina House of Representatives 6th district general election, 2014
Party	Candidate	Votes	%
Democratic	Paul Tine (incumbent)	16,523	53.57%
Republican	Mattie Lawson	14,319	46.43%
Total votes		30,842	100%
Democratic hold			

==== District 7 ====
Incumbent Democrat Bobbie Richardson has represented the 7th district since 2013.

North Carolina House of Representatives 7th district general election, 2014
Party	Candidate	Votes	%
Democratic	Bobbie Richardson (incumbent)	18,628	100%
Total votes		18,628	100%
Democratic hold			

==== District 8 ====
Incumbent Republican Susan Martin has represented the 8th district since 2013.

North Carolina House of Representatives 8th district general election, 2014
Party	Candidate	Votes	%
Republican	Susan Martin (incumbent)	17,035	60.80%
Democratic	Bobi Gregory	10,981	39.20%
Total votes		28,016	100%
Republican hold			

==== District 9 ====
Incumbent Republican Brian Brown has represented the 9th district since 2013.

North Carolina House of representatives 9th district general election, 2014
Party	Candidate	Votes	%
Republican	Brian Brown (incumbent)	13,474	60.07%
Democratic	Uriah Ward	8,957	39.93%
Total votes		22,431	100%
Republican hold			

==== District 10 ====
Incumbent Republican John Bell has represented the 10th district since 2013.

North Carolina House of Representatives 10th district general election, 2014
Party	Candidate	Votes	%
Republican	John Bell (incumbent)	19,577	100%
Total votes		19,577	100%
Republican hold			

==== District 11 ====
Incumbent Democrat Duane Hall has represented the 11th district since 2013.

North Carolina House of Representatives 11th district general election, 2014
Party	Candidate	Votes	%
Democratic	Duane Hall (incumbent)	14,799	61.49%
Republican	Ray Martin	9,268	38.51%
Total votes		24,067	100%
Democratic hold			

==== District 12 ====
Incumbent Democrat George Graham has represented the 12th district since 2013.

North Carolina House of Representatives 12th district general election, 2014
Party	Candidate	Votes	%
Democratic	George Graham (incumbent)	16,301	100%
Total votes		16,301	100%
Democratic hold			

==== District 13 ====
Incumbent Republican Pat McElraft has represented the 13th district since 2007.

North Carolina House of Representatives 13th district general election, 2014
Party	Candidate	Votes	%
Republican	Pat McElraft (incumbent)	19,946	69.73%
Democratic	Jim Nolan	8,659	30.27%
Total votes		28,605	100%
Republican hold			

==== District 14 ====
Incumbent Republican George Cleveland has represented the 14th district since 2005.

North Carolina House of Representatives 14th district general election, 2014
Party	Candidate	Votes	%
Republican	George Cleveland (incumbent)	10,740	100%
Total votes		10,740	100%
Republican hold			

==== District 15 ====
Incumbent Republican Phil Shepard has represented the 15th district since 2011.

North Carolina House of Representatives 15th district general election, 2014
Party	Candidate	Votes	%
Republican	Phil Shepard (incumbent)	8,221	100%
Total votes		8,221	100%
Republican hold			

==== District 16 ====
Incumbent Republican Chris Millis has represented the 16th district since 2013.

North Carolina House of Representatives 16th district general election, 2014
Party	Candidate	Votes	%
Republican	Chris Millis (incumbent)	14,049	66.46%
Democratic	Steve Unger	7,091	33.54%
Total votes		21,140	100%
Republican hold			

==== District 17 ====
Incumbent Republican Frank Iler has represented the 17th district since 2009.

North Carolina House of representatives 17th district general election, 2014
Party	Candidate	Votes	%
Republican	Frank Iler (incumbent)	20,945	67.14%
Democratic	Charles Warren	10,251	32.86%
Total votes		31,196	100%
Republican hold			

==== District 18 ====
Incumbent Democrat Susi Hamilton has represented the 18th district since 2011.

North Carolina House of Representatives 18th district general election, 2014
Party	Candidate	Votes	%
Democratic	Susi Hamilton (incumbent)	14,786	100%
Total votes		14,786	100%
Democratic hold			

==== District 19 ====
Incumbent Republican Ted Davis Jr. has represented the 19th district since 2012.

North Carolina House of Representatives 19th district general election, 2014
Party	Candidate	Votes	%
Republican	Ted Davis Jr. (incumbent)	18,467	100%
Total votes		18,467	100%
Republican hold			

=== Districts 20-39 ===
==== District 20 ====
Incumbent Republican Rick Catlin has represented the 20th district since 2013.

North Carolina House of representavives 20th district general election, 2014
Party	Candidate	Votes	%
Republican	Rick Catlin (incumbent)	16,844	62.16%
Democratic	Betsy Jordan	10,252	37.84%
Total votes		27,096	100%
Republican hold			

==== District 21 ====
Incumbent Democrat Larry Bell has represented the 21st district since 2001.

North Carolina House of Representatives 21st district general election, 2014
Party	Candidate	Votes	%
Democratic	Larry Bell (incumbent)	15,937	100%
Total votes		15,937	100%
Democratic hold			

==== District 22 ====
Incumbent Democrat William Brisson has represented the 22nd district since 2007.

North Carolina House of Representatives 22nd district general election, 2014
Party	Candidate	Votes	%
Democratic	William Brisson (incumbent)	12,208	51.99%
Republican	Ken Smith	11,274	48.01%
Total votes		23,482	100%
Democratic hold			

==== District 23 ====
Incumbent Democrat Joe Tolson has represented the 23rd district and its predecessors since 1997. Tolson didn't seek re-election and was succeeded by Democrat Shelly Willingham.

North Carolina House of Representatives 23rd district general election, 2014
Party	Candidate	Votes	%
Democratic	Shelly Willingham	18,660	100%
Total votes		18,660	100%
Democratic hold			

==== District 24 ====
Incumbent Democrat Jean Farmer-Butterfield has represented the 24th district since 2003.

North Carolina House of Representatives 24th district general election, 2014
Party	Candidate	Votes	%
Democratic	Jean Farmer-Butterfield (incumbent)	15,427	100%
Total votes		15,427	100%
Democratic hold			

==== District 25 ====
Incumbent Republican Jeff Collins has represented the 25th district since 2011.

North CarolinaHouse of Representatives 25th district general election, 2014
Party	Candidate	Votes	%
Republican	Jeff Collins (incumbent)	19,163	68.07%
Democratic	Charles M. Johnson	8,990	31.93%
Total votes		28,156	100%
Republican hold			

==== District 26 ====
Incumbent Republican Leo Daughtry has represented the 26th district and its predecessors since 1993.

North Carolina House of Representatives 26th district general election, 2014
Party	Candidate	Votes	%
Republican	Leo Daughtry (incumbent)	18,754	100%
Total votes		18,754	100%
Republican hold			

==== District 27 ====
Incumbent Democrat Michael Wray has represented the 27th district since 2005.

North Carolina House of Representatives 27th district general election, 2014
Party	Candidate	Votes	%
Democratic	Michael Wray (incumbent)	17,446	100%
Total votes		17,446	100%
Democratic hold			

==== District 28 ====
Incumbent Republican James Langdon Jr. has represented the 28th district since 2005.

North Carolina House of Representatives 28th district general election, 2014
Party	Candidate	Votes	%
Republican	James Langdon Jr. (incumbent)	17,487	100%
Total votes		17,487	100%
Republican hold			

==== District 29 ====
Incumbent Democratic Minority Leader Larry Hall has represented the 29th district since 2006.

North Carolina House of Representatives 29th district general election, 2014
Party	Candidate	Votes	%
Democratic	Larry Hall (incumbent)	22,667	100%
Total votes		22,667	100%
Democratic hold			

==== District 30 ====
Incumbent Democrat Paul Luebke has represented the 30th district and its predecessors since 1991.

North Carolina House of Representatives 30th district general election, 2014
Party	Candidate	Votes	%
Democratic	Paul Luebke (incumbent)	23,535	100%
Total votes		23,535	100%
Democratic hold			

==== District 31 ====
Incumbent Democrat Mickey Michaux has represented the 31st district and its predecessors since 1983.

North Carolina House of Representatives 31st district general election, 2014
Party	Candidate	Votes	%
Democratic	Mickey Michaux (incumbent)	20,745	88.18%
Republican	Todd Conrad	2,780	11.82%
Total votes		23,525	100%
Democratic hold			

==== District 32 ====
Incumbent Democrat Nathan Baskerville has represented the 32nd district since 2013.

North Carolina House of Representatives 32nd district general election, 2014
Party	Candidate	Votes	%
Democratic	Nathan Baskerville (incumbent)	19,931	100%
Total votes		19,931	100%
Democratic hold			

==== District 33 ====
Incumbent Democrat Rosa Gill has represented the 33rd district since 2009.

North Carolina House of Representatives 33rd district general election, 2014
Party	Candidate	Votes	%
Democratic	Rosa Gill (incumbent)	18,552	87.27%
Republican	Perry Whitlock	2,707	12.73%
Total votes		21,259	100%
Democratic hold			

==== District 34 ====
Incumbent Democrat Grier Martin has represented the 34th district since 2013.

North Carolina House of Representatives 34th district general election, 2014
Party	Candidate	Votes	%
Democratic	Grier Martin (incumbent)	22,929	100%
Total votes		22,929	100%
Democratic hold			

==== District 35 ====
Incumbent Democrat Chris Malone has represented the 35th district since 2013.

North Carolina House of Representatives 35th district general election, 2014
Party	Candidate	Votes	%
Republican	Chris Malone (incumbent)	15,891	56.30%
Democratic	Brian Mountcastle	12,336	43.70%
Total votes		28,227	100%
Republican hold			

==== District 36 ====
Incumbent Republican Nelson Dollar has represented the 36th district since 2005.

North Carolina House of Representatives 36th district general election, 2014
Party	Candidate	Votes	%
Republican	Nelson Dollar (incumbent)	19,159	54.34%
Democratic	Lisa Baker	16,097	45.66%
Total votes		35,256	100%
Republican hold			

==== District 37 ====
Incumbent Republican Paul Stam has represented the 37th district since 2003.

North Carolina House of Representatives 37th district general election, 2014
Party	Candidate	Votes	%
Republican	Paul Stam (incumbent)	20,972	100%
Total votes		20,972	100%
Republican hold			

==== District 38 ====
Incumbent Democrat Yvonne Lewis Holley has represented the 38th district since 2013.

North Carolina House of Representatives 38th district general election, 2014
Party	Candidate	Votes	%
Democratic	Yvonne Lewis Holley (incumbent)	17,883	79.90%
Republican	Joe Thompson	4,498	20.10%
Total votes		22,381	100%
Democratic hold			

==== District 39 ====
Incumbent Democrat Darren Jackson has represented the 39th district since 2009.

North Carolina House of Representatives 39th district general election, 2014
Party	Candidate	Votes	%
Democratic	Darren Jackson (incumbent)	18,823	100%
Total votes		18,823	100%
Democratic hold			

=== Districts 40-59 ===
==== District 40 ====
Incumbent Republican Marilyn Avila has represented the 40th district since 2007.

North Carolina House of Representatives 40th district general election, 2014
Party	Candidate	Votes	%
Republican	Marilyn Avila (incumbent)	16,120	54.30%
Democratic	Margaret E. Broadwell	13,567	45.70%
Total votes		29,687	100%
Republican hold			

==== District 41 ====
Incumbent Republican Tom Murry has represented the 41st district since 2011. Murry was defeated for re-election by Democrat Gale Adcock.

North Carolina House of Representatives 41st district general election, 2014
Party	Candidate	Votes	%
Democratic	Gale Adcock	15,160	51.32%
Republican	Tom Murry (incumbent)	14,383	48.68%
Total votes		29,543	100%
Democratic gain from Republican			

==== District 42 ====
Incumbent Democrat Marvin Lucas has represented the 42nd district since 2001.

North Carolina House of Representatives 42nd district general election, 2014
Party	Candidate	Votes	%
Democratic	Marvin Lucas (incumbent)	13,708	100%
Total votes		13,708	100%
Democratic hold			

==== District 43 ====
Incumbent Democrat Elmer Floyd has represented the 43rd district since 2009.

North Carolina House of Representatives 43rd district general election, 2014
Party	Candidate	Votes	%
Democratic	Elmer Floyd (incumbent)	15,955	100%
Total votes		15,955	100%
Democratic hold			

==== District 44 ====
Incumbent Democrat Rick Glazier has represented the 44th district since 2003.

North Carolina House of Representatives 44th district general election, 2014
Party	Candidate	Votes	%
Democratic	Rick Glazier (incumbent)	10,171	52.51%
Republican	Richard Button	9,200	47.49%
Total votes		19,371	100%
Democratic hold			

==== District 45 ====
Incumbent Republican John Szoka has represented the 45th district since 2013.

North Carolina House of Representatives 45th district general election, 2014
Party	Candidate	Votes	%
Republican	John Szoka (incumbent)	12,813	100%
Total votes		12,813	100%
Republican hold			

==== District 46 ====
Incumbent Democrat Ken Waddell has represented the 46th district since 2013.

North Carolina House of Representatives 46th district general election, 2014
Party	Candidate	Votes	%
Democratic	Ken Waddell (incumbent)	11,551	53.42%
Republican	Brenden Jones	10,073	46.58%
Total votes		21,624	100%
Democratic hold			

==== District 47 ====
Incumbent Democrat Charles Graham has represented the 47th district since 2011.

North Carolina House of Representatives 47th district general election, 2014
Party	Candidate	Votes	%
Democratic	Charles Graham (incumbent)	9,978	100%
Total votes		9,978	100%
Democratic hold			

==== District 48 ====
Incumbent Democrat Garland Pierce has represented the 48th district since 2005.

North Carolina House of Representatives 48th district general election, 2014
Party	Candidate	Votes	%
Democratic	Garland Pierce (incumbent)	16,119	100%
Total votes		16,119	100%
Democratic hold			

==== District 49 ====
Incumbent Republican Gary Pendleton has represented the 49th district since his appointment on August 19, 2014. Pendleton is seeking his first full term.

North Carolina House of Representatives 49th district general election, 2014
Party	Candidate	Votes	%
Republican	Gary Pendleton (incumbent)	20,588	51.63%
Democratic	Kim Hanchette	19,290	48.37%
Total votes		39,878	100%
Republican hold			

==== District 50 ====
Incumbent Democrat Graig Meyer has represented the 50th district since his appointment in October 2013. Meyer was elected to his first full term.

North Carolina House of Represesntatives 50th district general election, 2014
Party	Candidate	Votes	%
Democratic	Graig Meyer (incumbent)	18,574	57.16%
Republican	Rod Chaney	13,920	42.84%
Total votes		32,494	100%
Democratic hold			

==== District 51 ====
Incumbent Republican Mike Stone has represented the 51st district since 2011. Stone lost re-election to Democrat Brad Salmon.

North Carolina House of Representatives 51st district general election, 2014
Party	Candidate	Votes	%
Democratic	Brad Salmon	10,755	53.94%
Republican	Mike Stone (incumbent)	9,182	46.06%
Total votes		19,937	100%
Democratic gain from Republican			

==== District 52 ====
Incumbent Republican Jamie Boles has represented the 52nd district since 2009.

North Carolina House of Representatives 52nd district general election, 2014
Party	Candidate	Votes	%
Republican	Jamie Boles (incumbent)	21,751	100%
Total votes		21,751	100%
Republican hold			

==== District 53 ====
Incumbent Republican David Lewis has represented the 53rd district since 2003.

North Carolina House of Representatives 53rd district general election, 2014
Party	Candidate	Votes	%
Republican	David Lewis (incumbent)	10,966	55.74%
Democratic	Susan Byerly	8,707	44.26%
Total votes		19,673	100%
Republican hold			

==== District 54 ====
Incumbent Democrat Robert Reives has represented the 54th district since 2014.

North Carolina House of Representatives 54th district general election, 2014
Party	Candidate	Votes	%
Democratic	Robert Reives (incumbent)	16,875	56.19%
Republican	Andy Wilkie	13,156	43.81%
Total votes		30,031	100%
Democratic hold			

==== District 55 ====
Incumbent Republican Mark Brody has represented the 55th district since 2014.

North Carolina House of Representatives 55th district general election, 2014
Party	Candidate	Votes	%
Republican	Mark Brody (incumbent)	12,484	58.94%
Democratic	Kim Hargett	8,698	41.06%
Total votes		21,182	100%
Republican hold			

==== District 56 ====
Incumbent Democrat Verla Insko has represented the 56th district since 1997.

North Carolina House of Representatives 56th district general election, 2014
Party	Candidate	Votes	%
Democratic	Verla Insko (incumbent)	25,601	81.19%
Republican	David (Dave) Pratt Carter	5,932	18.81%
Total votes		31,533	100%
Democratic hold			

==== District 57 ====
Incumbent Democrat Pricey Harrison has represented the 57th district since 2005.

North Carolina House of Representatives 57th district general election, 2014
Party	Candidate	Votes	%
Democratic	Pricey Harrison (incumbent)	17,577	100%
Total votes		17,577	100%
Democratic hold			

==== District 58 ====
Incumbent Democrat Alma Adams has represented the 58th district and its predecessors since 1994. Adams ran for the U.S House. Democrat Ralph Johnson won the open seat.

North Carolina House of Representatives 58th district general election, 2014
Party	Candidate	Votes	%
Democratic	Ralph Johnson	18,108	100%
Total votes		18,108	100%
Democratic hold			

==== District 59 ====
Incumbent Republican Jon Hardister has represented the 59th district since 2013.

North Carolina House of Representatives 58th district general election, 2014
Party	Candidate	Votes	%
Republican	Jon Hardister (incumbent)	19,784	60.20%
Democratic	Scott Jones	11,925	36.29%
Libertarian	Paul Meinhart	1,155	3.51%
Total votes		32,864	100%
Republican hold			

=== Districts 60-79 ===
==== District 60 ====
Incumbent Democrat Marcus Brandon has represented the 60th district since 2011. Brandon ran for the U.S House and fellow Democrat Cecil Brockman was elected to succeed him.

North Carolina House of Representatives 58th district general election, 2014
Party	Candidate	Votes	%
Democratic	Cecil Brockman	13,373	100%
Total votes		13,373	100%
Democratic hold			

==== District 61 ====
Incumbent Republican John Faircloth has represented the 61st District since 2011.

North Carolina House of Representatives 61st district general election, 2014
Party	Candidate	Votes	%
Republican	John Faircloth (incumbent)	19,030	67.17%
Democratic	Ron Weatherford	9,303	32.83%
Total votes		28,333	100%
Republican hold			

==== District 62 ====
Incumbent Republican John Blust has represented the 62nd District since 2001.

North Carolina House of Representatives 62nd district general election, 2014
Party	Candidate	Votes	%
Republican	John Blust (incumbent)	18,841	62.09%
Democratic	Sal Leone	11,504	37.91%
Total votes		30,345	100%
Republican hold			

==== District 63 ====
Incumbent Republican Stephen Ross has represented the 63rd District since 2013.

North Carolina House of Representatives 63rd district general election, 2014
Party	Candidate	Votes	%
Republican	Stephen Ross (incumbent)	13,041	57.01%
Democratic	Ian Baltutis	9,834	42.99%
Total votes		22,875	100%
Republican hold			

==== District 64 ====
Incumbent Republican Dennis Riddell has represented the 64th District since 2013.

North Carolina House of Representatives 64th district general election, 2014
Party	Candidate	Votes	%
Republican	Dennis Riddell (incumbent)	13,346	100%
Total votes		13,346	100%
Republican hold			

==== District 65 ====
Incumbent Republican Bert Jones has represented the 65th District since 2011.

North Carolina House of Representatives 65th district general election, 2014
Party	Candidate	Votes	%
Republican	Bert Jones (incumbent)	15,808	65.26%
Democratic	Elretha Perkins	8,416	34.74%
Total votes		24,224	100%
Republican hold			

==== District 66 ====
Incumbent Democrat Ken Goodman has represented the 66th District since 2011.

North Carolina House of Representatives 66th district general election, 2014
Party	Candidate	Votes	%
Democratic	Ken Goodman (incumbent)	14,697	100%
Total votes		14,697	100%
Democratic hold			

==== District 67 ====
Incumbent Republican Justin Burr has represented the 67th District since 2009.

North Carolina House of Representatives 67th district general election, 2014
Party	Candidate	Votes	%
Republican	Justin Burr (incumbent)	15,094	59.28%
Democratic	Nalin Mehta	10,367	40.72%
Total votes		25,461	100%
Republican hold			

==== District 68 ====
Incumbent Republican Craig Horn has represented the 68th District since 2011.

North Carolina House of Representatives 68th district general election, 2014
Party	Candidate	Votes	%
Republican	Craig Horn (incumbent)	16,430	100%
Total votes		16,430	100%
Republican hold			

==== District 69 ====
Incumbent Republican Dean Arp has represented the 69th District since 2013.

North Carolina House of Representatives 69th district general election, 2014
Party	Candidate	Votes	%
Republican	Dean Arp (incumbent)	13,973	100%
Total votes		13,973	100%
Republican hold			

==== District 70 ====
Incumbent Republican Pat Hurley has represented the 70th District since 2007.

North Carolina House of Representatives 70th district general election, 2014
Party	Candidate	Votes	%
Republican	Pat Hurley (incumbent)	15,508	100%
Total votes		15,508	100%
Republican hold			

==== District 71 ====
Incumbent Democrat Evelyn Terry has represented the 71st District since 2013.

North Carolina House of Representatives 71st district general election, 2014
Party	Candidate	Votes	%
Democratic	Evelyn Terry (incumbent)	12,536	76.63%
Republican	Kris A. McCann	3,824	23.37%
Total votes		16,360	100%
Democratic hold			

==== District 72 ====
Incumbent Democrat Ed Hanes has represented the 72nd District since 2013.

North Carolina House of Representatives 72nd district general election, 2014
Party	Candidate	Votes	%
Democratic	Ed Hanes (incumbent)	17,274	100%
Total votes		17,274	100%
Democratic hold			

==== District 73 ====
Incumbent Republican Mark Hollo has represented the 73rd District and its predecessors since 2011. Hollo didn't seek re-election and Republican Lee Zachary won the open seat.

North Carolina House of Representatives 73rd district general election, 2014
Party	Candidate	Votes	%
Republican	Lee Zachary	19,650	100%
Total votes		19,650	100%
Republican hold			

==== District 74 ====
Incumbent Republican Debra Conrad has represented the 74th District since 2013.

North Carolina House of Representatives 74th district general election, 2014
Party	Candidate	Votes	%
Republican	Debra Conrad (incumbent)	17,654	63.04%
Democratic	Mary Dickinson	10,351	36.96%
Total votes		28,005	100%
Republican hold			

==== District 75 ====
Incumbent Republican Donny Lambeth has represented the 75th District since 2013.

North Carolina House of Representatives 75th district general election, 2014
Party	Candidate	Votes	%
Republican	Donny Lambeth (incumbent)	16,616	62.77%
Democratic	David Gordon	9,857	37.23%
Total votes		26,473	100%
Republican hold			

==== District 76 ====
Incumbent Republican Carl Ford has represented the 76th District since 2013.

North Carolina House of Representatives 76th district general election, 2014
Party	Candidate	Votes	%
Republican	Carl Ford (incumbent)	16,947	100%
Total votes		16,947	100%
Republican hold			

==== District 77 ====
Incumbent Republican Harry Warren has represented the 77th District since 2011.

North Carolina House of Representatives 77th district general election, 2014
Party	Candidate	Votes	%
Republican	Harry Warren (incumbent)	16,888	100%
Total votes		16,888	100%
Republican hold			

==== District 78 ====
Incumbent Republican Allen McNeill has represented the 78th District since 2012.

North Carolina House of Representatives 78th district general election, 2014
Party	Candidate	Votes	%
Republican	Allen McNeill (incumbent)	17,102	100%
Total votes		17,102	100%
Republican hold			

==== District 79 ====
Incumbent Republican Julia Craven Howard has represented the 79th District and its predecessors since 1989.

North Carolina House of Representatives 79th district general election, 2014
Party	Candidate	Votes	%
Republican	Julia Craven Howard (incumbent)	18,448	70.25%
Democratic	Cristina Victoria Vazquez	7,811	29.75%
Total votes		26,259	100%
Republican hold			

=== Districts 80-99 ===
==== District 80 ====
Incumbent Republican Roger Younts has represented the 80th District since his appointment July 2013. Younts lost re-nomination to fellow Republican Sam Watford. Watford won the general election.

North Carolina House of Representatives 80th district general election, 2014
Party	Candidate	Votes	%
Republican	Sam Watford	16,459	100%
Total votes		16,459	100%
Republican hold			

==== District 81 ====
Incumbent Republican Rayne Brown has represented the 81st District since 2011.

North Carolina House of Representatives 81st district general election, 2014
Party	Candidate	Votes	%
Republican	Rayne Brown (incumbent)	15,090	100%
Total votes		15,090	100%
Republican hold			

==== District 82 ====
Incumbent Republican Larry Pittman has represented the 82nd District since 2011.

North Carolina House of Representatives 82nd district general election, 2014
Party	Candidate	Votes	%
Republican	Larry Pittman (incumbent)	13,818	59.50%
Democratic	Earle H. Schecter	9,404	40.50%
Total votes		23,222	100%
Republican hold			

==== District 83 ====
Incumbent Republican Linda Johnson has represented the 83rd District and its predecessors since 2001.

North Carolina House of Representatives 83rd district general election, 2014
Party	Candidate	Votes	%
Republican	Linda Johnson (incumbent)	15,334	100%
Total votes		15,334	100%
Republican hold			

==== District 84 ====
Incumbent Republican Rena Turner has represented the 84th District since 2013.

North Carolina House of Representatives 84th district general election, 2014
Party	Candidate	Votes	%
Republican	Rena Turner (incumbent)	17,136	69.59%
Democratic	Gene Mitchell Mahaffey	7,487	30.41%
Total votes		24,623	100%
Republican hold			

==== District 85 ====
Incumbent Republican Josh Dobson has represented the 85th District since 2013.

North Carolina House of Representatives 85th district general election, 2014
Party	Candidate	Votes	%
Republican	Josh Dobson (incumbent)	15,467	74.88%
Democratic	JR Edwards	5,188	25.12%
Total votes		20,655	100%
Republican hold			

==== District 86 ====
Incumbent Republican Hugh Blackwell has represented the 86th District since 2009.

North Carolina House of Representatives 86th district general election, 2014
Party	Candidate	Votes	%
Republican	Hugh Blackwell (incumbent)	13,970	63.80%
Democratic	Jim Cates	7,926	36.20%
Total votes		21,896	100%
Republican hold			

==== District 87 ====
Incumbent Republican Edgar Starnes has represented the 87th District and its predecessors since 1997.

North Carolina House of Representatives 87th district general election, 2014
Party	Candidate	Votes	%
Republican	Edgar Starnes (incumbent)	16,148	100%
Total votes		16,148	100%
Republican hold			

==== District 88 ====
Incumbent Republican Rob Bryan has represented the 88th District since 2013.

North Carolina House of Representatives 88th district general election, 2014
Party	Candidate	Votes	%
Republican	Rob Bryan (incumbent)	14,644	55.37%
Democratic	Margie Storch	11,805	44.63%
Total votes		26,449	100%
Republican hold			

==== District 89 ====
Incumbent Republican Mitchell Setzer has represented the 89th District and its predecessors since 1999.

North Carolina House of Representatives 89th district general election, 2014
Party	Candidate	Votes	%
Republican	Mitchell Setzer (incumbent)	16,616	100%
Total votes		16,616	100%
Republican hold			

==== District 90 ====
Incumbent Republican Sarah Stevens has represented the 90th District since 2009.

North Carolina House of Representatives 90th district general election, 2014
Party	Candidate	Votes	%
Republican	Sarah Stevens (incumbent)	13,440	68.25%
Democratic	John Worth Wiles	6,251	31.75%
Total votes		19,691	100%
Republican hold			

==== District 91 ====
Incumbent Republican Bryan Holloway has represented the 91st District since 2005.

North Carolina House of Representatives 91st district general election, 2014
Party	Candidate	Votes	%
Republican	Bryan Holloway (incumbent)	18,443	100%
Total votes		18,443	100%
Republican hold			

==== District 92 ====
Incumbent Republican Charles Jeter has represented the 92nd District since 2013.

North Carolina House of Representatives 92nd district general election, 2014
Party	Candidate	Votes	%
Republican	Charles Jeter (incumbent)	11,757	52.54%
Democratic	Robin Bradford	10,621	47.46%
Total votes		22,378	100%
Republican hold			

==== District 93 ====
Incumbent Republican Jonathan Jordan has represented the 93rd District since 2011.

North Carolina House of Representatives 93rd district general election, 2014
Party	Candidate	Votes	%
Republican	Jonathan Jordan (incumbent)	13,886	53.08%
Democratic	Sue Counts	12,274	46.92%
Total votes		26,160	100%
Republican hold			

==== District 94 ====
Incumbent Republican Jeffrey Elmore has represented the 94th District since 2013.

North Carolina House of Representatives 94th district general election, 2014
Party	Candidate	Votes	%
Republican	Jeffrey Elmore (incumbent)	16,357	100%
Total votes		16,357	100%
Republican hold			

==== District 95 ====
Incumbent Republican Robert Brawley has represented the 95th District since 2013. Brawley lost re-nomination to fellow Republican John Fraley.

North Carolina House of Representatives 95th district general election, 2014
Party	Candidate	Votes	%
Republican	John Fraley	18,451	100%
Total votes		18,451	100%
Republican hold			

==== District 96 ====
Incumbent Republican Andy Wells has represented the 96th District since 2013. Wells ran for the State Senate. Republican Jay Adams won the open seat.

North Carolina House of Representatives 96th district general election, 2014
Party	Candidate	Votes	%
Republican	Jay Adams	14,771	67.24%
Democratic	Cliff Moone	7,196	32.76%
Total votes		21,967	100%
Republican hold			

==== District 97 ====
Incumbent Republican Jason Saine has represented the 97th District since 2011.

North Carolina House of Representatives 97th district general election, 2014
Party	Candidate	Votes	%
Republican	Jason Saine (incumbent)	16,604	70.65%
Democratic	Rosemary B. Hubbard	6,898	29.35%
Total votes		23,502	100%
Republican hold			

==== District 98 ====
Incumbent Republican Speaker of the House Thom Tillis has represented the 98th District since 2007. Tillis ran for the U.S. Senate. Republican John Bradford won the open seat.

North Carolina House of Representatives 98th district general election, 2014
Party	Candidate	Votes	%
Republican	John Bradford	14,558	54.98%
Democratic	Natasha Marcus	11,922	45.02%
Total votes		26,480	100%
Republican hold			

==== District 99 ====
Incumbent DemocratRodney Moore has represented the 99th District since 2011.

North Carolina House of Representatives 99th district general election, 2014
Party	Candidate	Votes	%
Democratic	Rodney Moore (incumbent)	15,189	100%
Total votes		15,189	100%
Democratic hold			

=== Districts 100-120 ===
==== District 100 ====
Incumbent Democrat Tricia Cotham has represented the 100th District since 2007.

North Carolina House of Representatives 100th district general election, 2014
Party	Candidate	Votes	%
Democratic	Tricia Cotham (incumbent)	12,707	100%
Total votes		12,707	100%
Democratic hold			

==== District 101 ====
Incumbent Democrat Beverly Earle has represented the 101st District and its predecessors since 1995.

North Carolina House of Representatives 101st district general election, 2014
Party	Candidate	Votes	%
Democratic	Beverly Earle (incumbent)	15,339	100%
Total votes		15,339	100%
Democratic hold			

==== District 102 ====
Incumbent Democrat Becky Carney has represented the 102nd District since 2003.

North Carolina House of Representatives 102nd district general election, 2014
Party	Candidate	Votes	%
Democratic	Becky Carney (incumbent)	12,938	100%
Total votes		12,938	100%
Democratic hold			

==== District 103 ====
Incumbent Republican Bill Brawley has represented the 103rd District since 2011.

North Carolina House of Representatives 103rd district general election, 2014
Party	Candidate	Votes	%
Republican	Bill Brawley (incumbent)	15,641	100%
Total votes		15,641	100%
Republican hold			

==== District 104 ====
Incumbent Republican Ruth Samuelson has represented the 104th District since 2007. Samuelson didn't seek re-election and Republican Dan Bishop won the open seat.

North Carolina House of Representatives 104th district general election, 2014
Party	Candidate	Votes	%
Republican	Dan Bishop	18,576	74.78%
Libertarian	Eric Cable	6,266	25.22%
Total votes		24,842	100%
Republican hold			

==== District 105 ====
Incumbent Republican Jacqueline Schaffer has represented the 105th District since 2013.

North Carolina House of Representatives 105th district general election, 2014
Party	Candidate	Votes	%
Republican	Jacqueline Schaffer (incumbent)	15,270	100%
Total votes		15,270	100%
Republican hold			

==== District 106 ====
Incumbent Democrat Carla Cunningham has represented the 106th District since 2013.

North Carolina House of Representatives 106th district general election, 2014
Party	Candidate	Votes	%
Democratic	Carla Cunningham (incumbent)	12,942	86.64%
Republican	Trey Lowe	1,996	13.36%
Total votes		14,938	100%
Democratic hold			

==== District 107 ====
Incumbent Democrat Kelly Alexander has represented the 107th District since 2009.

North Carolina House of Representatives 107th district general election, 2014
Party	Candidate	Votes	%
Democratic	Kelly Alexander (incumbent)	18,049	100%
Total votes		18,049	100%
Democratic hold			

==== District 108 ====
Incumbent Republican John Torbett has represented the 108th District since 2011.

North Carolina House of Representatives 108th district general election, 2014
Party	Candidate	Votes	%
Republican	John Torbett (incumbent)	13,766	100%
Total votes		13,766	100%
Republican hold			

==== District 109 ====
Incumbent Republican Dana Bumgardner has represented the 109th District since 2013.

North Carolina House of Representatives 109th district general election, 2014
Party	Candidate	Votes	%
Republican	Dana Bumgardner (incumbent)	14,221	100%
Total votes		14,221	100%
Republican hold			

==== District 110 ====
Incumbent Republican Kelly Hastings has represented the 110th District since 2011.

North Carolina House of Representatives 110th district general election, 2014
Party	Candidate	Votes	%
Republican	Kelly Hastings (incumbent)	14,394	100%
Total votes		14,394	100%
Republican hold			

==== District 111 ====
Incumbent Republican Tim Moore has represented the 111th District since 2003.

North Carolina House of Representatives 110th district general election, 2014
Party	Candidate	Votes	%
Republican	Tim Moore (incumbent)	15,338	100%
Total votes		15,338	100%
Republican hold			

==== District 112 ====
Incumbent Republican Mike Hager has represented the 112th District since 2011.

North Carolina House of Representatives 112th district general election, 2014
Party	Candidate	Votes	%
Republican	Mike Hager (incumbent)	12,722	58.58%
Democratic	Lisa Harris Bralley	8,997	41.42%
Total votes		21,719	100%
Republican hold			

==== District 113 ====
Incumbent Republican Chris Whitmire has represented the 113th District since 2013.

North Carolina House of Representatives 113th district general election, 2014
Party	Candidate	Votes	%
Republican	Chris Whitmire (incumbent)	19,594	63.26%
Democratic	Norm Bossert	11,379	36.74%
Total votes		30,973	100%
Republican hold			

==== District 114 ====
Incumbent Democrat Susan Fisher has represented the 114th District since 2004.

North Carolina House of Representatives 114th district general election, 2014
Party	Candidate	Votes	%
Democratic	Susan Fisher (incumbent)	24,402	100%
Total votes		24,402	100%
Democratic hold			

==== District 115 ====
Incumbent Republican Nathan Ramsey has represented the 115th District since 2013. Ramsey lost re-election to Democrat John Ager.

North Carolina House of Representatives 115th district general election, 2014
Party	Candidate	Votes	%
Democratic	John Ager	15,523	50.81%
Republican	Nathan Ramsey (incumbent)	15,027	49.19%
Total votes		30,550	100%
Democratic gain from Republican			

==== District 116 ====
Incumbent Republican Tim Moffitt has represented the 116th District since 2011. Moffitt lost re-election to Democrat Brian Turner.

North Carolina House of Representatives 116th district general election, 2014
Party	Candidate	Votes	%
Democratic	Brian Turner	13,298	51.91%
Republican	Tim Moffitt (incumbent)	12,321	48.09%
Total votes		25,619	100%
Democratic gain from Republican			

==== District 117 ====
Incumbent Republican Chuck McGrady has represented the 117th District since 2011.

North Carolina House of Representatives 117th district general election, 2014
Party	Candidate	Votes	%
Republican	Chuck McGrady (incumbent)	17,292	74.76%
Libertarian	Shelby Mood	5,838	25.24%
Total votes		23,130	100%
Republican hold			

==== District 118 ====
Incumbent Republican Michele Presnell has represented the 118th District since 2013.

North Carolina House of Representatives 118th district general election, 2014
Party	Candidate	Votes	%
Republican	Michele Presnell (incumbent)	13,858	51.27%
Democratic	Dean Hicks	13,169	48.73%
Total votes		27,027	100%
Republican hold			

==== District 119 ====
Incumbent Democrat Joe Sam Queen has represented the 119th District since 2013.

North Carolina House of Representatives 119th district general election, 2014
Party	Candidate	Votes	%
Democratic	Joe Sam Queen (incumbent)	11,777	52.58%
Republican	Mike Clampitt	10,623	47.42%
Total votes		22,400	100%
Democratic hold			

==== District 120 ====
Incumbent Republican Roger West has represented the 120th District and its predecessors since 2000.

North Carolina House of Representatives 120th district general election, 2014
Party	Candidate	Votes	%
Republican	Roger West (incumbent)	22,496	100%
Total votes		22,496	100%
Republican hold			

== See also ==
- List of North Carolina state legislatures
