= Timothy L. Spear =

American politician from North Carolina

Representative Timothy Spear
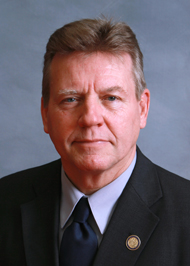
- Spear in 2011

Member of the North Carolina House of Representatives from the 2nd district
- In office January 27, 2006 – January 1, 2013
- Preceded by: Bill Culpepper
- Succeeded by: Paul Tine (Redistricting)

Personal details
- Party: Democratic
- Spouse: Judy
- Occupation: Clerk of Superior Court, retired

Timothy L. "Tim" Spear was a Democratic member of the North Carolina General Assembly, representing the state's second House district, including constituents in Chowan, Dare, Gates, Perquimans and Tyrrell counties. He was originally appointed to the position in January 2006 to replace William T. Culpepper III who had resigned.

== Recent Electoral History ==
North Carolina House District 2 General Election 2010
Party	Candidate	Votes	%
Democratic	Timothy L. (Tim) Spear	12,733	54.88
Republican	Bob Steinburg	10,467	45.12
Majority		2266	9.77%
Total votes		23,200	100.00

North Carolina House of Representatives
Preceded by Bill Culpepper	Member of the North Carolina House of Representatives from the 2nd district 2006–2013	Succeeded by Winkie Wilkins
