= Phillip D. Frye =

American politician from North Carolina

Representative Phillip Frye
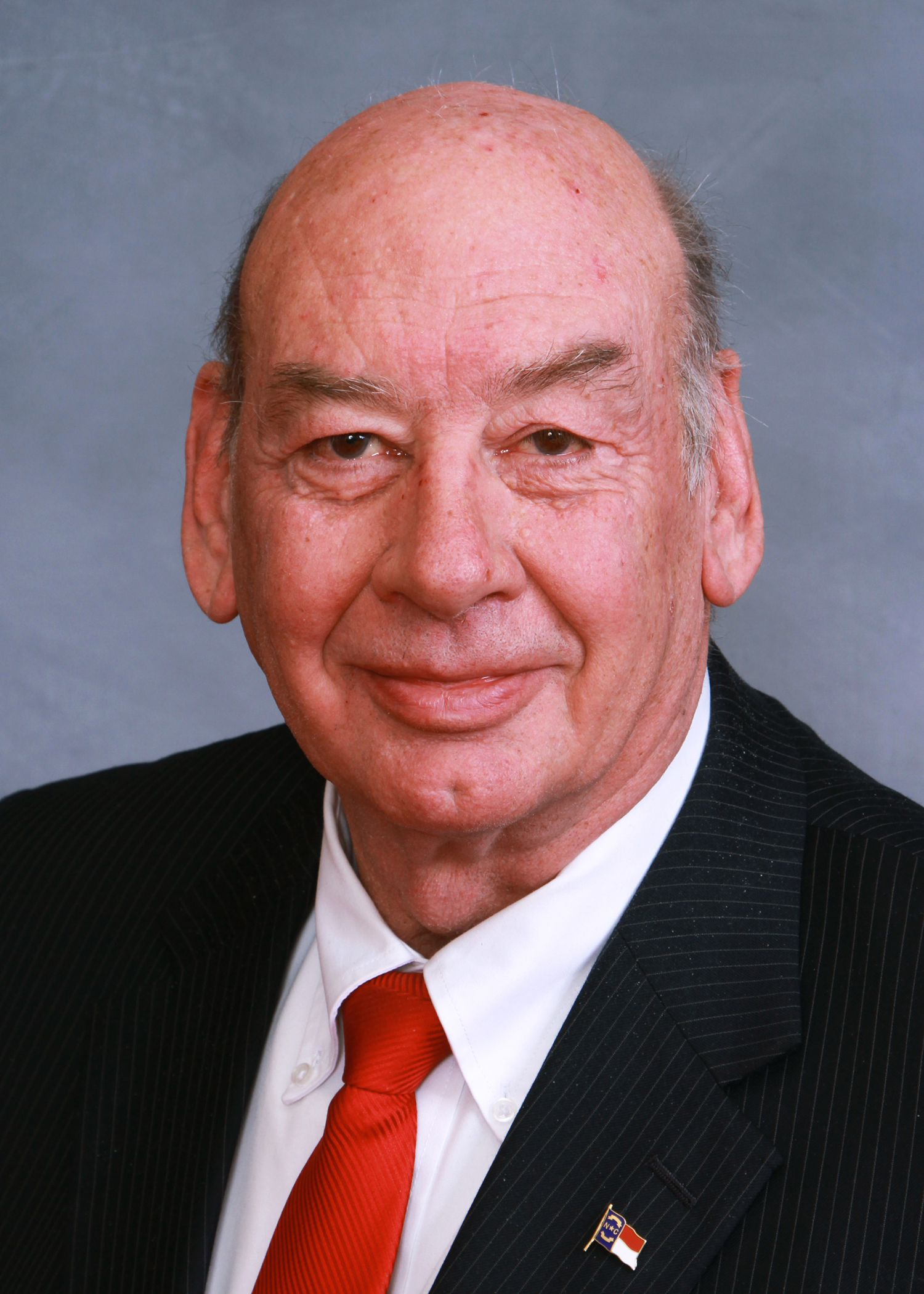

Member of the North Carolina House of Representatives from the 84th district
- In office January 1, 2003 – January 1, 2013
- Preceded by: Charles Buchanan; Gregory Thompson (Redistricting)
- Succeeded by: Mitch Gillespie (Redistricting)

Personal details
- Party: Republican
- Occupation: Business Owner – Frye Auto Interiors
- NCGA Website Project Vote Smart

Phillip Dean Frye was a Republican member of the North Carolina General Assembly representing the state's eighty-fourth House district, including constituents in Avery, Caldwell, Mitchell, and Yancey counties. A business owner from Spruce Pine, North Carolina, Frye served in his first state House term during the 2003–2004 session and his fifth and final term in the 2011–2012 session. He announced in 2011 that he would not run again in 2012 after the legislature passed a redistricting bill that put him in the same district with Rep. Mitch Gillespie.

In December 2007, Frye pleaded guilty to driving while impaired after being arrested on Christmas Eve.

== Electoral history ==
=== 2010 ===
North Carolina House of Representatives 84th district general election, 2010
| Party | Candidate | Votes | % |
|---|---|---|---|
| Republican | Phillip Frye (incumbent) | 15,393 | 100% |
| Total votes | | 15,393 | 100% |
| Republican hold | | | |

=== 2008 ===
North Carolina House of Representatives 84th district general election, 2008
| Party | Candidate | Votes | % |
|---|---|---|---|
| Republican | Phillip Frye (incumbent) | 20,412 | 100% |
| Total votes | | 20,412 | 100% |
| Republican hold | | | |

=== 2006 ===
North Carolina House of Representatives 84th district Republican primary election, 2006
| Party | Candidate | Votes | % |
|---|---|---|---|
| Republican | Phillip Frye (incumbent) | 6,731 | 66.81% |
| Republican | Charles Monroe Buchanan | 3,344 | 33.19% |
| Total votes | | 10,075 | 100% |

North Carolina House of Representatives 84th district general election, 2006
| Party | Candidate | Votes | % |
|---|---|---|---|
| Republican | Phillip Frye (incumbent) | 13,150 | 100% |
| Total votes | | 13,150 | 100% |
| Republican hold | | | |

=== 2004 ===
North Carolina House of Representatives 84th district Republican primary election, 2004
| Party | Candidate | Votes | % |
|---|---|---|---|
| Republican | Phillip Frye (incumbent) | 3,951 | 53.87% |
| Republican | Charles M. Buchanan | 3,383 | 46.13% |
| Total votes | | 7,334 | 100% |

North Carolina House of Representatives 84th district general election, 2004
| Party | Candidate | Votes | % |
|---|---|---|---|
| Republican | Phillip Frye (incumbent) | 20,718 | 87.05% |
| Libertarian | C. Barry Williams | 3,082 | 12.95% |
| Total votes | | 23,800 | 100% |
| Republican hold | | | |

=== 2002 ===
North Carolina House of Representatives 84th district Republican primary election, 2002
| Party | Candidate | Votes | % |
|---|---|---|---|
| Republican | Phillip Frye | 6,103 | 56.86% |
| Republican | Charles "Monroe" Buchanan (incumbent) | 4,630 | 43.14% |
| Total votes | | 10,733 | 100% |

North Carolina House of Representatives 84th district general election, 2002
| Party | Candidate | Votes | % |
|---|---|---|---|
| Republican | Phillip Frye | 14,422 | 84.14% |
| Libertarian | Jeff Young | 2,719 | 15.86% |
| Total votes | | 17,141 | 100% |
| Republican hold | | | |

North Carolina House of Representatives
| Preceded by Michael Decker | Member of the North Carolina House of Representatives from the 84th district 2003–2013 | Succeeded by Rena Turner |
