= Jeffrey McNeely =

American politician

Jeffrey C. McNeely
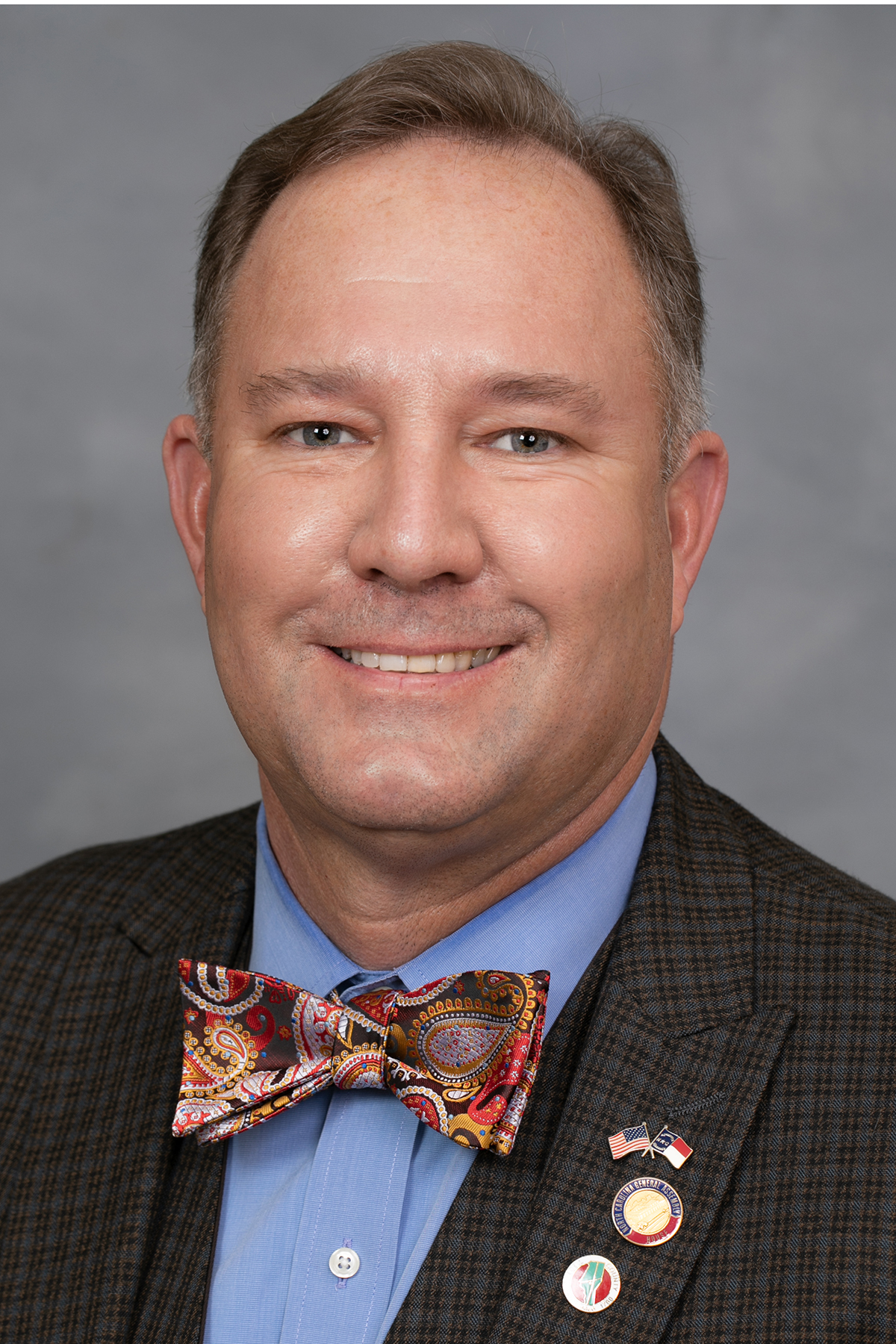

Member of the North Carolina House of Representatives from the 84th district
- Incumbent
- Assumed office July 5, 2019
- Preceded by: Rena Turner

Personal details
- Born: Jeffrey Carrol McNeely; June 12, 1964 (age 62)
- Party: Republican
- Education: North Carolina State University
- Occupation: Business owner
- Website: Official website

Jeffrey Carrol McNeely (born 1964) is a Republican member of the North Carolina House of Representatives who has represented the 84th district (including parts of Iredell County) since 2019. McNeely inherited his family's feed milling company in Statesville and lives on property that he says "was given to my family from King James in 1670." McNeely graduated from West Iredell High School and North Carolina State University. He spent 16 years on the Iredell County Planning Board. He was appointed to the North Carolina House to replace Rena Turner in 2019.

== Political career ==
=== Committee assignments ===
==== 2025–2026 session ====
- Agriculture and Environment (Chair)
- Transportation (Chair)
- Appropriations
- Appropriations - Agriculture and Natural and Economic Resources (Vice Chair)
- Select Committee on Helene Recovery
- Select Committee on North Carolina's Transportation Future (Vice Chair)
- Select Committee on Oversight and Reform
- Oversight

==== 2023–2024 session ====
- Agriculture (Chair)
- Transportation (Chair)
- Appropriations
- Appropriations - Agriculture and Natural and Economic Resources
- Environment

==== 2021–2022 session ====
- Agriculture (Chair)
- Education - K-12
- Appropriations
- Appropriations - Agriculture and Natural and Economic Resources
- Judiciary IV

==== 2019–2020 session ====
- Agriculture
- Education - K-12
- Appropriations
- Appropriations - Justice and Public Safety
- Judiciary

=== Controversies ===
In 2023, while debating an education bill, McNeely asked a black colleague whether his success in education would have been possible if he "wasn't an athlete or a minority"

=== Electoral history ===
==== 2024 ====
North Carolina House of Representatives 84th district Republican primary election, 2024
Party	Candidate	Votes	%
Republican	Jeffrey McNeely (incumbent)	6,775	55.24%
Republican	John (Doug) Gallina	5,490	44.76%
Total votes		12,265	100%

North Carolina House of Representatives 84th district general election, 2024
Party	Candidate	Votes	%
Republican	Jeffrey McNeely (incumbent)	31,180	68.17%
Democratic	Chris Gilbert	13,424	29.35%
Independent	Lisa Mozer (write-in)	788	1.72%
Write-in		346	0.76%
Total votes		45,738	100%
Republican hold			

==== 2022 ====
North Carolina House of Representatives 84th district general election, 2022
Party	Candidate	Votes	%
Republican	Jeffrey McNeely (incumbent)	22,931	100%
Total votes		22,931	100%
Republican hold			

==== 2020 ====
North Carolina House of Representatives 84th district general election, 2020
Party	Candidate	Votes	%
Republican	Jeffrey McNeely (incumbent)	29,630	69.12%
Democratic	Gayle Wesley Harris	13,235	30.88%
Total votes		42,865	100%
Republican hold			

North Carolina House of Representatives
Preceded by Rena Turner	Member of the North Carolina House of Representatives from the 84th district 2019–present	Incumbent
