= Larry Yarborough =

American politician (born 1962)

Representative Larry Yarborough

Member of the North Carolina House of Representatives from the 2nd district
- In office January 1, 2015 – January 1, 2023
- Preceded by: Winkie Wilkins
- Succeeded by: Ray Jeffers

Personal details
- Born: Lawrence Emile Yarborough Jr. February 26, 1962 (age 64) Pass Christian, Mississippi, U.S.
- Party: Republican
- Spouse: Dr. Kimberly Yarborough
- Children: 3
- Education: Tulane University (BS)
- Occupation: Businessman

Lawrence Emile Yarborough Jr. (born February 26, 1962) is a former Republican member of the North Carolina House of Representatives who represented the state's 2nd district, including constituents in Granville and Person counties from 2015 to 2023. A businessman from Roxboro, North Carolina, Yarborough was elected to his first term in 2014.

== North Carolina General Assembly ==
Yarborough served on the Person County Board of Commissioners from 2004 to 2008. In 2010, Yarborough announced he would challenge Winkie Wilkins for the district 55 seat in the NC House, though he later withdrew from the race. In 2014 he ran for the seat again (this time renumbered as the 2nd district) and defeated Democrat Ray Jeffers in the 2014 November general election. Yarborough serves on eight North Carolina House Select Committees including Agriculture, Alcoholic Beverage Control, Appropriations, Agriculture and Natural and Economic Resources, Commerce and Job Development, Environment, Health, and Transportation. He is also a member of the Environmental Review Commission.

In November 2015, Rep, Yarborough was appointed to serve on the Environmental Review Commission. He was also appointed to serve as an advisory member on the Joint Legislative Oversight Committee on General Government and Joint Legislative Transportation Oversight Committee.

== Electoral history ==
=== 2022 ===
North Carolina House of Representatives 2nd district general election, 2022
Party	Candidate	Votes	%
Democratic	Ray Jeffers	19,692	54.57%
Republican	Larry Yarborough (incumbent)	15,674	43.44%
Libertarian	Gavin Bell	718	1.99%
Total votes		36,084	100%
Democratic gain from Republican			

=== 2020 ===
North Carolina House of Representatives 2nd district general election, 2020
Party	Candidate	Votes	%
Republican	Larry Yarborough (incumbent)	25,928	60.40%
Democratic	Cindy Deporter	17,000	39.60%
Total votes		42,928	100%
Republican hold			

=== 2018 ===
North Carolina House of Representatives 2nd district Republican primary election, 2018
Party	Candidate	Votes	%
Republican	Larry Yarborough (incumbent)	1,519	81.67%
Republican	Jim McIlroy	341	18.33%
Total votes		1,860	100%

North Carolina House of Representatives 2nd district general election, 2018
Party	Candidate	Votes	%
Republican	Larry Yarborough (incumbent)	16,124	55.31%
Democratic	Darryl D. Moss	13,026	44.69%
Total votes		29,150	100%
Republican hold			

=== 2016 ===
North Carolina House of Representatives 2nd district general election, 2016
Party	Candidate	Votes	%
Republican	Larry Yarborough (incumbent)	22,760	60.64%
Democratic	Joe Parrish	14,775	39.36%
Total votes		37,535	100%
Republican hold			

=== 2014 ===
North Carolina House of Representatives 2nd district Republican primary election, 2014
Party	Candidate	Votes	%
Republican	Larry Yarborough	1,755	66.83%
Republican	Sandra Hendrick Berry	483	18.39%
Republican	Jon Greg Bass	388	14.78%
Total votes		2,626	100%

North Carolina House of Representatives 2nd district general election, 2014
Party	Candidate	Votes	%
Republican	Larry Yarborough	13,423	56.68%
Democratic	Ray Jeffers	10,259	43.32%
Total votes		23,682	100%
Republican gain from Democratic			

== Committee assignments ==
=== 2021-2022 Session ===
- Appropriations
- Appropriations - Agriculture and Natural and Economic Resources (Vice Chair)
- Environment (Chair)
- Wildlife Resources (Chair)
- Regulatory Reform (Vice Chair)
- Agriculture
- Ethics
- Marine Resources and Aqua Culture

=== 2019-2020 Session ===
- Appropriations
- Appropriations - Agriculture and Natural and Economic Resources (Vice Chair)
- Environment (Chair)
- Regulatory Reform (Chair)
- Wildlife Resources (Vice Chair)
- Agriculture
- Alcoholic Beverage Control
- Ethics

=== 2017-2018 Session ===
- Appropriations
- Appropriations - Agriculture and Natural and Economic Resources
- Environment (Chair)
- Regulatory Reform (Vice Chair)
- Agriculture
- Alcoholic Beverage Control
- Health

=== 2015-2016 Session ===
- Appropriations
- Appropriations - Agriculture and Natural and Economic Resources
- Agriculture (Vice Chair)
- Alcoholic Beverage Control
- Commerce and Job Development
- Environment
- Health
- Transportation

North Carolina House of Representatives
Preceded by Winkie Wilkins	Member of the North Carolina House of Representatives from the 2nd district 2015–2023	Succeeded by Ray Jeffers
