= William T. Culpepper III =

American politician

William Thomas Culpepper III (born January 23, 1947) was a Democratic member of the North Carolina House of Representatives representing the second district, including constituents in Chowan, Dare, Gates, Perquimans and Tyrrell counties from 1993 to 2006. A lawyer from Edenton, North Carolina, Culpepper was the Chairman of the House Rules Committee from 1999 until 2005. Regarded as the greatest and most powerful Rules Chairman of all time, Culpepper will be remembered as the main architect of the co-speakership (Jim Black and Richard Morgan) in 2003 and the driving force behind passage of the state's education lottery in 2005.

Culpepper resigned from the legislature in 2006 when he was appointed by Governor Mike Easley to North Carolina's Utilities Commission. In 2015, he became General Counsel for the N.C. Office of Administrative Hearings.

A graduate of Hampden–Sydney College and Wake Forest University School of Law, Culpepper was a third generation member of the North Carolina House of Representatives. He is the father of two sons, William T. Culpepper, IV, an attorney in Charlotte, and W. Gardner Culpepper. He has one grandchild, William T. Culpepper, V.

North Carolina House of Representatives
Preceded by Raymond Thompson	Member of the North Carolina House of Representatives from the 86th district 1993–2003	Succeeded by Walt Church
Preceded by Zeno Edwards	Member of the North Carolina House of Representatives from the 2nd district 2003–2006	Succeeded by Timothy Spear
