= Walter G. Church Sr. =

American politician

Walter G. Church
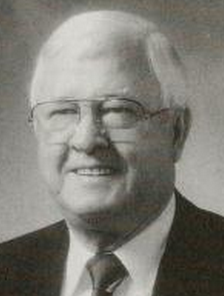

Member of the North Carolina House of Representatives
- In office January 27, 1993 – January 28, 2009
- Preceded by: Ray Charles Fletcher
- Succeeded by: Hugh Blackwell
- Constituency: 47th District (1993-2003); 86th District (2003-2009)

Personal details
- Born: June 30, 1927 Caldwell County, North Carolina, U.S.
- Died: October 1, 2012 (aged 85) Valdese, North Carolina, U.S.
- Party: Democratic
- Education: University of Wisconsin
- Profession: banker

Walter Greene Church Sr. (June 30, 1927 – October 1, 2012) was a Democratic member of the North Carolina House of Representatives who represented the state's 86th district, including constituents in Burke County. A banker from Valdese, North Carolina, Church served seven terms in the state House. In November 2008, Church was narrowly defeated by Republican Hugh Blackwell, denying him an eighth term. His son, Walter G. Church, Jr., won the May 4, 2010 Democratic primary to run to regain his father's former seat, but lost in the Fall to State Rep. Hugh A. Blackwell-R. He died in 2012.

== Electoral history ==
=== 2008 ===
North Carolina House of Representatives 86th district general election, 2008
Party	Candidate	Votes	%
Republican	Hugh Blackwell	14,140	51.61%
Democratic	Walt Church (incumbent)	13,259	48.39%
Total votes		27,399	100%
Republican gain from Democratic			

=== 2006 ===
North Carolina House of Representatives 86th district general election, 2006
Party	Candidate	Votes	%
Democratic	Walt Church (incumbent)	8,369	51.50%
Republican	Hugh Blackwell	7,883	48.50%
Total votes		16,252	100%
Democratic hold			

=== 2004 ===
North Carolina House of Representatives 86th district general election, 2004
Party	Candidate	Votes	%
Democratic	Walt Church (incumbent)	16,029	100%
Total votes		16,029	100%
Democratic hold			

=== 2002 ===
North Carolina House of Representatives 86th district general election, 2002
Party	Candidate	Votes	%
Democratic	Walt Church (incumbent)	11,586	59.10%
Republican	Earl A. Cook	8,019	40.90%
Total votes		19,605	100%
Democratic hold			

=== 2000 ===
North Carolina House of Representatives 47th district general election, 2000
Party	Candidate	Votes	%
Democratic	Walt Church (incumbent)	12,102	58.55%
Republican	Earl A. Cook	8,567	41.45%
Total votes		20,669	100%
Democratic hold			

North Carolina House of Representatives
Preceded by Ray Charles Fletcher	Member of the North Carolina House of Representatives from the 47th district 1993-2003	Succeeded by Ronnie Sutton
Preceded by Bill Culpepper	Member of the North Carolina House of Representatives from the 86th district 2003-2009	Succeeded by Hugh Blackwell
