= North Carolina's 55th House district =

American legislative district

North Carolina's 55th State House of Representatives district
Representative
Mark Brody; R–Monroe
- Demographics: 52% White; 24% Black; 18% Hispanic; 1% Asian; 4% Multiracial
- Population (2024): 86,268

North Carolina's 55th House district is one of 120 districts in the North Carolina House of Representatives. It has been represented by Republican Mark Brody since 2013.

== Geography ==
Since 2013, the district has included all of Anson County, as well as part of Union County. The district overlaps with the 29th and 35th Senate districts.

== District officeholders since 1985 ==
Representative	Party	Dates	Notes	Counties
District created January 1, 1985.
C. Ivan Mothershead (Charlotte)	Republican	January 1, 1985 – January 1, 1989		1985–2003; Part of Mecklenburg County.
David Balmer (Charlotte)	Republican	January 1, 1989 – January 1, 1995		1985–2003; Part of Mecklenburg County.
Ed McMahan (Charlotte)	Republican	January 1, 1995 – January 1, 2003	Redistricted to the 105th district.	1985–2003; Part of Mecklenburg County.
Gordon Allen (Roxboro)	Democratic	January 1, 2003 – January 1, 2005	Redistricted from the 22nd district. Retired.	2003–2005; All of Person County. Part of Orange County.
Winkie Wilkins (Roxboro)	Democratic	January 1, 2005 – January 1, 2013	Redistricted to the 2nd district.	2005–2013; All of Person County. Part of Durham County.
Mark Brody (Monroe)	Republican	January 1, 2013 – Present	Retiring.	2013–Present; All of Anson County. Part of Union County.

== Election results ==
=== 2026 ===
North Carolina House of Representatives 55th district Republican primary election, 2026
Party	Candidate	Votes	%
Republican	Clancy Baucom	4,516	79.19%
Republican	John Powell	792	13.89%
Republican	Richard Miller	395	6.93%
Total votes		5,703	100%

North Carolina House of Representatives 55th district general election, 2026
Party	Candidate	Votes	%
Republican	Clancy Baucom		
Democratic	John Kirkpatrick IV		
Total votes			100%

=== 2024 ===
North Carolina House of Representatives 55th district Republican primary election, 2024
Party	Candidate	Votes	%
Republican	Mark Brody (incumbent)	6,094	81.93%
Republican	Richard Miller	917	12.33%
Republican	Arthur McDonald	427	5.74%
Total votes		7,438	100%

North Carolina House of Representatives 55th district general election, 2024
Party	Candidate	Votes	%
Republican	Mark Brody (incumbent)	24,474	63.00%
Democratic	Judy Little	14,373	37.00%
Total votes		38,847	100%
Republican hold			

=== 2022 ===
North Carolina House of Representatives 55th district Republican primary election, 2022
Party	Candidate	Votes	%
Republican	Mark Brody (incumbent)	4,740	84.46%
Republican	Brandon Smith	872	15.54%
Total votes		5,612	100%

North Carolina House of Representatives 55th district general election, 2022
Party	Candidate	Votes	%
Republican	Mark Brody (incumbent)	18,930	100%
Total votes		18,930	100%
Republican hold			

=== 2020 ===
North Carolina House of Representatives 55th district general election, 2020
Party	Candidate	Votes	%
Republican	Mark Brody (incumbent)	20,800	58.32%
Democratic	Gloria Harrington Overcash	14,865	41.68%
Total votes		35,665	100%
Republican hold			

=== 2018 ===
North Carolina House of Representatives 55th district general election, 2018
Party	Candidate	Votes	%
Republican	Mark Brody (incumbent)	18,412	65.29%
Democratic	Frank Deese	9,790	34.71%
Total votes		28,202	100%
Republican hold			

=== 2016 ===
North Carolina House of Representatives 55th district general election, 2016
Party	Candidate	Votes	%
Republican	Mark Brody (incumbent)	20,901	60.37%
Democratic	Kim Hargett	13,719	39.63%
Total votes		34,620	100%
Republican hold			

=== 2014 ===
North Carolina House of Representatives 55th district general election, 2014
Party	Candidate	Votes	%
Republican	Mark Brody (incumbent)	12,484	58.94%
Democratic	Kim Hargett	8,698	41.06%
Total votes		21,182	100%
Republican hold			

=== 2012 ===
North Carolina House of Representatives 55th district Republican primary election, 2012
Party	Candidate	Votes	%
Republican	Mark Brody	3,892	47.60%
Republican	Richard Johnson	3,830	46.84%
Republican	John L. Barker	455	5.56%
Total votes		8,177	100%

North Carolina House of Representatives 55th district general election, 2012
Party	Candidate	Votes	%
Republican	Mark Brody	18,962	56.60%
Democratic	Dale Nelson	14,540	43.40%
Total votes		33,502	100%
Republican gain from Democratic			

=== 2010 ===
North Carolina House of Representatives 55th district Democratic primary election, 2010
Party	Candidate	Votes	%
Democratic	Winkie Wilkins (incumbent)	4,876	60.03%
Democratic	Fred Foster Jr.	2,899	35.69%
Democratic	R. Miles Standish	348	4.28%
Total votes		8,123	100%

North Carolina House of Representatives 55th district general election, 2010
Party	Candidate	Votes	%
Democratic	Winkie Wilkins (incumbent)	16,619	100%
Total votes		16,619	100%
Democratic hold			

=== 2008 ===
North Carolina House of Representatives 55th district general election, 2008
Party	Candidate	Votes	%
Democratic	Winkie Wilkins (incumbent)	27,774	100%
Total votes		27,774	100%
Democratic hold			

=== 2006 ===
North Carolina House of Representatives 55th district general election, 2006
Party	Candidate	Votes	%
Democratic	Winkie Wilkins (incumbent)	14,319	100%
Total votes		14,319	100%
Democratic hold			

=== 2004 ===
North Carolina House of Representatives 55th district general election, 2004
Party	Candidate	Votes	%
Democratic	Winkie Wilkins	22,524	88.91%
Libertarian	Tom Rose	2,810	11.09%
Total votes		25,334	100%
Democratic hold			

=== 2002 ===
North Carolina House of Representatives 55th district Democratic primary election, 2002
Party	Candidate	Votes	%
Democratic	Gordon Allen (incumbent)	5,805	63.12%
Democratic	Kenneth Rothrock	3,392	36.88%
Total votes		9,197	100%

North Carolina House of Representatives 55th district general election, 2002
Party	Candidate	Votes	%
Democratic	Gordon Allen (incumbent)	11,712	55.40%
Republican	Kathy Hartkopf	9,427	44.60%
Total votes		21,139	100%
Democratic hold			

=== 2000 ===
North Carolina House of Representatives 55th district general election, 2000
Party	Candidate	Votes	%
Republican	Ed McMahan (incumbent)	17,422	100%
Total votes		17,422	100%
Republican hold			
