= North Carolina's 84th House district =

American legislative district

North Carolina's 84th State House of Representatives district
Representative
Jeffrey McNeely; R–Stony Point
- Demographics: 69% White; 14% Black; 12% Hispanic; 1% Asian; 1% Other; 4% Multiracial
- Population (2024): 92,077

North Carolina's 84th House district is one of 120 districts in the North Carolina House of Representatives. It has been represented by Republican Jeffrey McNeely since 2019.

== Geography ==
Since 2013, the district has included part of Iredell County. The district overlaps with the 37th Senate district.

== District officeholders ==
Representative	Party	Dates	Notes	Counties
District created January 1, 1993.
Michael Decker (Walkertown)	Republican	January 1, 1993 – January 1, 2003	Redistricted from the 29th district. Redistricted to the 94th district.	1993–2003; Parts of Forsyth and Guilford counties.
Phillip Frye (Spruce Pine)	Republican	January 1, 2003 – January 1, 2013	Redistricted to the 85th district and retired.	2003–2005; All of Mitchell and Avery counties. Part of Caldwell County.
Phillip Frye (Spruce Pine)	Republican	January 1, 2003 – January 1, 2013	Redistricted to the 85th district and retired.	2005–2013; All of Mitchell and Avery counties. Parts of Caldwell and Yancey counties.
Rena Turner (Olin)	Republican	January 1, 2013 – June 27, 2019	Resigned.	2013–Present; Part of Iredell County.
Vacant		June 27, 2019 – July 5, 2019		2013–Present; Part of Iredell County.
Jeffrey McNeely (Stony Point)	Republican	July 5, 2019 – Present	Appointed to finish Turner's term.	2013–Present; Part of Iredell County.

== Election results ==
=== 2024 ===
North Carolina House of Representatives 84th district Republican primary election, 2024
Party	Candidate	Votes	%
Republican	Jeffrey McNeely (incumbent)	6,775	55.24%
Republican	John (Doug) Gallina	5,490	44.76%
Total votes		12,265	100%

North Carolina House of Representatives 84th district general election, 2024
Party	Candidate	Votes	%
Republican	Jeffrey McNeely (incumbent)	31,180	68.17%
Democratic	Chris Gilbert	13,424	29.35%
Independent	Lisa Mozer (write-in)	788	1.72%
Write-in		346	0.76%
Total votes		45,738	100%
Republican hold			

=== 2022 ===
North Carolina House of Representatives 84th district general election, 2022
Party	Candidate	Votes	%
Republican	Jeffrey McNeely (incumbent)	22,931	100%
Total votes		22,931	100%
Republican hold			

=== 2020 ===
North Carolina House of Representatives 84th district general election, 2020
Party	Candidate	Votes	%
Republican	Jeffrey McNeely (incumbent)	29,630	69.12%
Democratic	Gayle Wesley Harris	13,235	30.88%
Total votes		42,865	100%
Republican hold			

=== 2018 ===
North Carolina House of Representatives 84th district general election, 2018
Party	Candidate	Votes	%
Republican	Rena Turner (incumbent)	20,483	68.90%
Democratic	Allen R. Edwards	9,246	31.10%
Total votes		29,729	100%
Republican hold			

=== 2016 ===
North Carolina House of Representatives 84th district Republican primary election, 2016
Party	Candidate	Votes	%
Republican	Rena Turner (incumbent)	7,841	63.77%
Republican	Kirk Sherrill	4,454	36.23%
Total votes		12,295	100%

North Carolina House of Representatives 84th district general election, 2016
Party	Candidate	Votes	%
Republican	Rena Turner (incumbent)	25,414	69.29%
Democratic	John Wayne Kahl	11,266	30.71%
Total votes		36,680	100%
Republican hold			

=== 2014 ===
North Carolina House of Representatives 84th district Republican primary election, 2014
Party	Candidate	Votes	%
Republican	Rena Turner (incumbent)	5,889	65.47%
Republican	Jay White	2,191	24.36%
Republican	Kirk Sherrill	915	10.17%
Total votes		8,995	100%

North Carolina House of Representatives 84th district general election, 2014
Party	Candidate	Votes	%
Republican	Rena Turner (incumbent)	17,136	69.59%
Democratic	Gene Mitchell Mahaffey	7,487	30.41%
Total votes		24,623	100%
Republican hold			

=== 2012 ===
North Carolina House of Representatives 84th district Republican primary election, 2012
Party	Candidate	Votes	%
Republican	Rena Turner	5,250	46.66%
Republican	Frank Mitchell	4,505	40.04%
Republican	Kirk Sherrill	1,497	13.30%
Total votes		11,252	100%

North Carolina House of Representatives 84th district general election, 2012
Party	Candidate	Votes	%
Republican	Rena Turner	23,284	65.27%
Democratic	Gene Mitchell Mahaffey	12,388	34.73%
Total votes		35,672	100%
Republican win (new seat)			

=== 2010 ===
North Carolina House of Representatives 84th district general election, 2010
Party	Candidate	Votes	%
Republican	Phillip Frye (incumbent)	15,393	100%
Total votes		15,393	100%
Republican hold			

=== 2008 ===
North Carolina House of Representatives 84th district general election, 2008
Party	Candidate	Votes	%
Republican	Phillip Frye (incumbent)	20,412	100%
Total votes		20,412	100%
Republican hold			

=== 2006 ===
North Carolina House of Representatives 84th district Republican primary election, 2006
Party	Candidate	Votes	%
Republican	Phillip Frye (incumbent)	6,731	66.81%
Republican	Charles Monroe Buchanan	3,344	33.19%
Total votes		10,075	100%

North Carolina House of Representatives 84th district general election, 2006
Party	Candidate	Votes	%
Republican	Phillip Frye (incumbent)	13,150	100%
Total votes		13,150	100%
Republican hold			

=== 2004 ===
North Carolina House of Representatives 84th district Republican primary election, 2004
Party	Candidate	Votes	%
Republican	Phillip Frye (incumbent)	3,951	53.87%
Republican	Charles M. Buchanan	3,383	46.13%
Total votes		7,334	100%

North Carolina House of Representatives 84th district general election, 2004
Party	Candidate	Votes	%
Republican	Phillip Frye (incumbent)	20,718	87.05%
Libertarian	C. Barry Williams	3,082	12.95%
Total votes		23,800	100%
Republican hold			

=== 2002 ===
North Carolina House of Representatives 84th district Republican primary election, 2002
Party	Candidate	Votes	%
Republican	Phillip Frye	6,103	56.86%
Republican	Charles "Monroe" Buchanan (incumbent)	4,630	43.14%
Total votes		10,733	100%

North Carolina House of Representatives 84th district general election, 2002
Party	Candidate	Votes	%
Republican	Phillip Frye	14,422	84.14%
Libertarian	Jeff Young	2,719	15.86%
Total votes		17,141	100%
Republican hold			

=== 2000 ===
North Carolina House of Representatives 84th district Democratic primary election, 2000
Party	Candidate	Votes	%
Democratic	Joseph M. Coltrane Jr.	1,719	59.67%
Democratic	David Rowe	1,162	40.33%
Total votes		2,881	100%

North Carolina House of Representatives 84th district general election, 2000
Party	Candidate	Votes	%
Republican	Michael Decker (incumbent)	18,708	65.00%
Democratic	Joseph M. Coltrane Jr.	10,074	35.00%
Total votes		28,782	100%
Republican hold			
