= North Carolina's 2nd House district =

American legislative district

North Carolina's 2nd State House of Representatives district
Representative
Ray Jeffers; D–Roxboro
- Demographics: 55% White; 29% Black; 10% Hispanic; 2% Asian; 4% Multiracial
- Population (2024): 89,100

North Carolina's 2nd House district is one of 120 districts in the North Carolina House of Representatives. It has been represented by Democrat Ray Jeffers since 2023.

== Geography ==
Since 2023, the district has included all of Person County, as well as part of Durham County. The district overlaps with the 22nd and 23rd Senate districts.

== District officeholders ==
=== Multi-member district ===
Representative	Party	Dates	Notes	Representative	Party	Dates	Notes	Counties
District created January 1, 1967.
Bill Roberson Jr. (Washington)	Democratic	January 1, 1967 – January 1, 1973	Redistricted to the single-member district.	Archie Burrus (Manteo)	Democratic	January 1, 1967 – January 1, 1973		1967–1973; All of Beaufort, Washington, Tyrrell, Hyde, and Dare counties.

=== Single-member district ===
Representative	Party	Dates	Notes	Counties
Bill Roberson Jr. (Washington)	Democratic	January 1, 1973 – January 1, 1975	Redistricted from the multi-member district.	1973–1983; All of Beaufort and Hyde counties.
Howard Chapin (Washington)	Democratic	January 1, 1975 – January 1, 1993		1973–1983; All of Beaufort and Hyde counties.
Howard Chapin (Washington)	Democratic	January 1, 1975 – January 1, 1993		1983–1993; All of Beaufort and Hyde counties. Part of Washington County.
Zeno Edwards (Washington)	Republican	January 1, 1993 – January 1, 1997		1993–2003; All of Beaufort and Hyde counties. Parts of Pitt and Craven counties.
Edwin Hardy (Washington)	Republican	January 1, 1997 – January 1, 1999		1993–2003; All of Beaufort and Hyde counties. Parts of Pitt and Craven counties.
Zeno Edwards (Washington)	Democratic	January 1, 1999 – January 1, 2003	Redistricted to the 6th district and retired.	1993–2003; All of Beaufort and Hyde counties. Parts of Pitt and Craven counties.
Bill Culpepper (Edenton)	Democratic	January 1, 2003 – January 3, 2006	Redistricted from the 86th district. Resigned.	2003–2005; All of Dare, Tyrrell, Perquimans, and Chowan counties. Part of Gates County.
Bill Culpepper (Edenton)	Democratic	January 1, 2003 – January 3, 2006	Redistricted from the 86th district. Resigned.	2005–2013; All of Dare, Hyde, Washington, and Chowan counties.
Vacant		January 3, 2006 – January 27, 2006		2005–2013; All of Dare, Hyde, Washington, and Chowan counties.
Timothy Spear (Creswell)	Democratic	January 27, 2006 – January 1, 2013	Appointed to finish Culpepper's term. Redistricted to the 6th district and retired.	2005–2013; All of Dare, Hyde, Washington, and Chowan counties.
Winkie Wilkins (Roxboro)	Democratic	January 1, 2013 – January 1, 2015	Redistricted from the 55th district. Retired.	2013–2023; All of Person County. Part of Granville County.
Larry Yarborough (Roxboro)	Republican	January 1, 2015 – January 1, 2023	Lost re-election.	2013–2023; All of Person County. Part of Granville County.
Ray Jeffers (Roxboro)	Democratic	January 1, 2023 – Present		2023–Present; All of Person County. Part of Durham County.

== Election results ==
=== 2024 ===
North Carolina House of Representatives 2nd district general election, 2024
Party	Candidate	Votes	%
Democratic	Ray Jeffers (incumbent)	28,332	57.58%
Republican	Jason Chambers	20,874	42.42%
Total votes		49,206	100%
Democratic hold			

=== 2022 ===
North Carolina House of Representatives 2nd district general election, 2022
Party	Candidate	Votes	%
Democratic	Ray Jeffers	19,692	54.57%
Republican	Larry Yarborough (incumbent)	15,674	43.44%
Libertarian	Gavin Bell	718	1.99%
Total votes		36,084	100%
Democratic gain from Republican			

=== 2020 ===
North Carolina House of Representatives 2nd district general election, 2020
Party	Candidate	Votes	%
Republican	Larry Yarborough (incumbent)	25,928	60.40%
Democratic	Cindy Deporter	17,000	39.60%
Total votes		42,928	100%
Republican hold			

=== 2018 ===
North Carolina House of Representatives 2nd district Democratic primary election, 2018
Party	Candidate	Votes	%
Democratic	Darryl D. Moss	3,658	70.70%
Democratic	Dora P. Bullock	1,516	29.30%
Total votes		5,174	100%

North Carolina House of Representatives 2nd district Republican primary election, 2018
Party	Candidate	Votes	%
Republican	Larry Yarborough (incumbent)	1,519	81.67%
Republican	Jim McIlroy	341	18.33%
Total votes		1,860	100%

North Carolina House of Representatives 2nd district general election, 2018
Party	Candidate	Votes	%
Republican	Larry Yarborough (incumbent)	16,124	55.31%
Democratic	Darryl D. Moss	13,026	44.69%
Total votes		29,150	100%
Republican hold			

=== 2016 ===
North Carolina House of Representatives 2nd district general election, 2016
Party	Candidate	Votes	%
Republican	Larry Yarborough (incumbent)	22,760	60.64%
Democratic	Joe Parrish	14,775	39.36%
Total votes		37,535	100%
Republican hold			

=== 2014 ===
North Carolina House of Representatives 2nd district Democratic primary election, 2014
Party	Candidate	Votes	%
Democratic	Ray Jeffers	2,862	43.82%
Democratic	Dalton L. Huff	1,887	28.89%
Democratic	Brent Groce	1,782	27.29%
Total votes		6,531	100%

North Carolina House of Representatives 2nd district Republican primary election, 2014
Party	Candidate	Votes	%
Republican	Larry Yarborough	1,755	66.83%
Republican	Sandra Hendrick Berry	483	18.39%
Republican	Jon Greg Bass	388	14.78%
Total votes		2,626	100%

North Carolina House of Representatives 2nd district general election, 2014
Party	Candidate	Votes	%
Republican	Larry Yarborough	13,423	56.68%
Democratic	Ray Jeffers	10,259	43.32%
Total votes		23,682	100%
Republican gain from Democratic			

=== 2012 ===
North Carolina House of Representatives 2nd district Democratic primary election, 2012
Party	Candidate	Votes	%
Democratic	Winkie Wilkins (incumbent)	6,000	55.72%
Democratic	Jim Crawford (incumbent)	3,977	36.93%
Democratic	Jason Jenkins	791	7.35%
Total votes		10,768	100%

North Carolina House of Representatives 2nd district Republican primary election, 2012
Party	Candidate	Votes	%
Republican	Timothy Karan	2,821	58.89%
Republican	Jon Gregory Bass	1,969	41.11%
Total votes		4,790	100%

North Carolina House of Representatives 2nd district general election, 2012
Party	Candidate	Votes	%
Democratic	Winkie Wilkins (incumbent)	20,398	56.68%
Republican	Timothy Karan	15,587	43.32%
Total votes		35,985	100%
Democratic hold			

=== 2010 ===
North Carolina House of Representatives 2nd district general election, 2010
Party	Candidate	Votes	%
Democratic	Timothy Spear (incumbent)	12,733	54.88%
Republican	Bob Steinburg	10,467	45.12%
Total votes		23,200	100%
Democratic hold			

=== 2008 ===
North Carolina House of Representatives 2nd district general election, 2008
Party	Candidate	Votes	%
Democratic	Timothy Spear (incumbent)	20,705	63.30%
Republican	Chris East	11,152	34.09%
Libertarian	Jesse Mignogna	852	2.60%
Total votes		32,709	100%
Democratic hold			

=== 2006 ===
North Carolina House of Representatives 2nd district general election, 2006
Party	Candidate	Votes	%
Democratic	Timothy Spear (incumbent)	12,193	68.73%
Republican	Daniel M. Beall	5,547	31.27%
Total votes		17,740	100%
Democratic hold			

=== 2004 ===
North Carolina House of Representatives 2nd district general election, 2004
Party	Candidate	Votes	%
Democratic	Bill Culpepper (incumbent)	16,949	61.51%
Republican	Daniel M. Beall	10,607	38.49%
Total votes		27,556	100%
Democratic hold			

=== 2002 ===
North Carolina House of Representatives 2nd district general election, 2002
Party	Candidate	Votes	%
Democratic	Bill Culpepper (incumbent)	11,867	63.45%
Republican	Daniel M. Beall	6,837	36.55%
Total votes		18,704	100%
Democratic hold			

=== 2000 ===
North Carolina House of Representatives 2nd district general election, 2000
Party	Candidate	Votes	%
Democratic	Zeno Edwards (incumbent)	12,843	54.85%
Republican	Stan Deatherage	10,570	45.15%
Total votes		23,413	100%
Democratic hold			
