= Mark Brody =

American politician

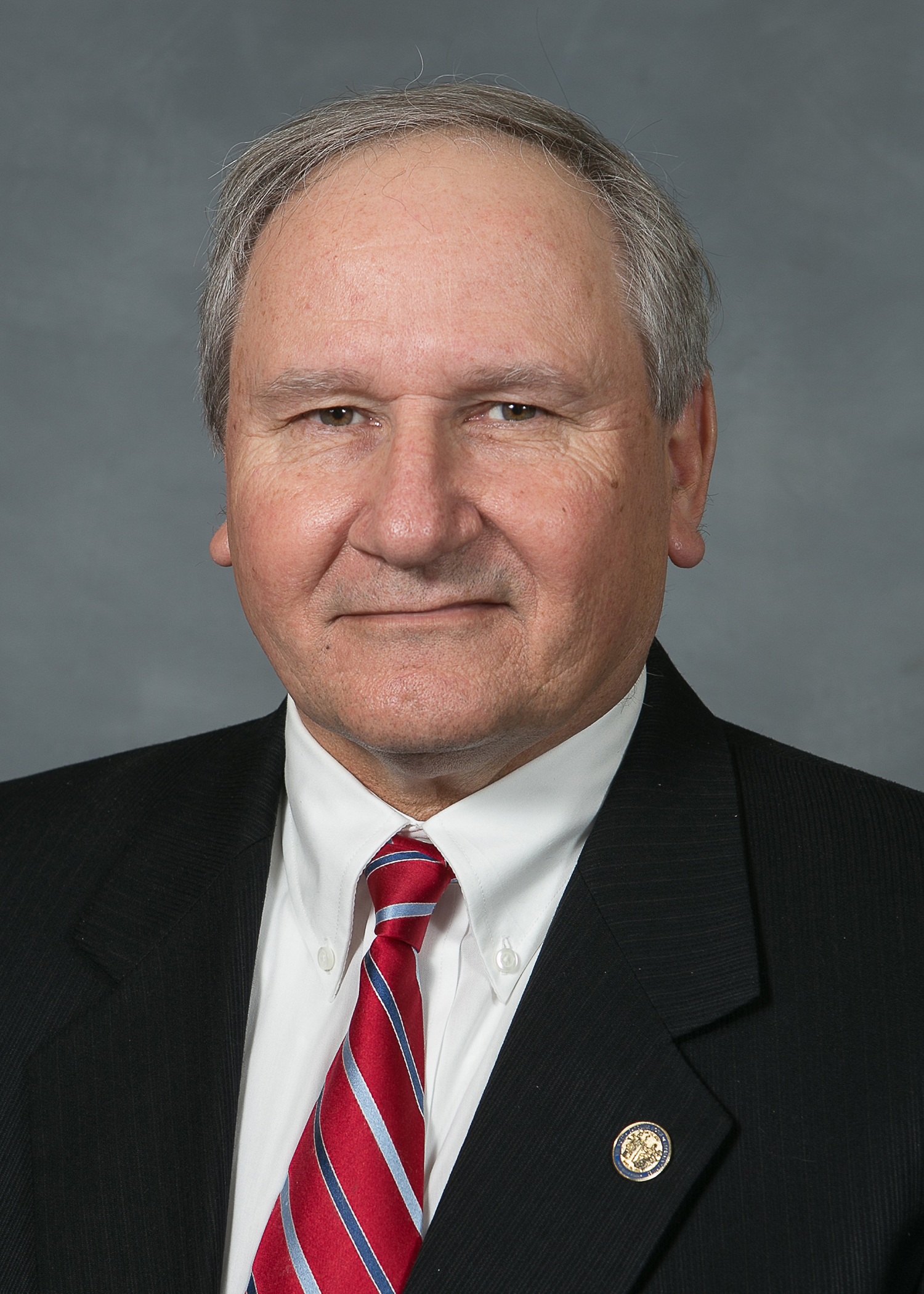

Member of the North Carolina House of Representatives from the 55th district
- Incumbent
- Assumed office January 1, 2013
- Preceded by: Frank McGuirt (redistricting)

Personal details
- Born: Mark Allen Brody; December 6, 1951 (age 74) Milwaukee, Wisconsin, U.S.
- Party: Republican
- Spouse: Lisa
- Children: 3
- Education: Concordia University Wisconsin (BA)
- Occupation: General contractor

Mark Allen Brody (born December 6, 1951) is a Wisconsin-born Republican member of the North Carolina House of Representatives. He has represented the 55th district (including constituents in Anson and Union counties) since 2013.

== Life and career ==
In 1996, Brody received his Bachelor of Arts at Concordia University Wisconsin, a private Christian university in Mequon, Wisconsin. Brody serves on the board of Union Day School in Waxhaw, North Carolina, a charter school launched in 2016 to serve K–3 students. The school is a tuition-free, publicly funded school run by an independent board. Brody is a formerly licensed general contractor who has built homes in Union, Mecklenburg, and Gaston counties. He faced several civil suits in a decade that alleged he failed to pay for materials or services rendered, according to an WSOC-TV news report in 2012; Brody claimed the allegations were politically motivated. He is sometimes cited as having served in the United States Navy Reserve from 1985 to 1993. His father served in the military (World War II), as did his grandfather, Joseph L. Brodowski (original surname to Brody).

== Political positions ==
On May 11, 2018, on his Facebook page, Brody called public school teachers in Union County, North Carolina, and North Carolina "Teacher Union thugs" in relation the 2018 North Carolina teachers' rally planned in Raleigh. Teachers' unions are illegal in the state of North Carolina. Brody defended the statement in a later interview with WBTV, saying that use of the "thug" phrase was about national unions. "When you pull the curtain away and see who’s pulling the levers on this, it’s the national teacher union and those are the ones I was referring to," he said. He also said he wasn't trying to say anything negative about local teachers.

== Committee assignments ==
=== 2021-2022 session ===
- Appropriations
- Appropriations - Education
- Local Government - Land Use, Planning and Development (Chair)
- Education - Community Colleges (Vice Chair)
- Agriculture
- Regulatory Reform
- Wildlife Resources

=== 2019-2020 session ===
- Regulatory Reform (Chair)
- Education - Community Colleges (Vice Chair)
- Agriculture
- Wildlife Resources
- Education - K-12
- Finance

=== 2017-2018 session ===
- Appropriations
- Appropriations - General Government
- Education - Community Colleges (Chair)
- Agriculture (Chair)
- Commerce and Job Development
- Education - Universities
- State and Local Government I

=== 2015-2016 session ===
- Appropriations
- Appropriations - General Government (Vice Chair)
- Education - Community Colleges (Chair)
- Agriculture (Chair)
- Regulatory Reform
- Commerce and Job Development
- Education - Universities
- Elections

=== 2013-2014 session ===
- Appropriations
- Agriculture
- Commerce and Job Development
- Government
- Health and Human Services

== Electoral history ==
=== 2020 ===
North Carolina House of Representatives 55th district general election, 2020
Party	Candidate	Votes	%
Republican	Mark Brody (incumbent)	20,800	58.32%
Democratic	Gloria Harrington Overcash	14,865	41.68%
Total votes		35,665	100%
Republican hold			

=== 2018 ===
North Carolina House of Representatives 55th district general election, 2018
Party	Candidate	Votes	%
Republican	Mark Brody (incumbent)	18,412	65.29%
Democratic	Frank Deese	9,790	34.71%
Total votes		28,202	100%
Republican hold			

=== 2016 ===
North Carolina House of Representatives 55th district general election, 2016
Party	Candidate	Votes	%
Republican	Mark Brody (incumbent)	20,901	60.37%
Democratic	Kim Hargett	13,719	39.63%
Total votes		34,620	100%
Republican hold			

=== 2014 ===
North Carolina House of Representatives 55th district general election, 2014
Party	Candidate	Votes	%
Republican	Mark Brody (incumbent)	12,484	58.94%
Democratic	Kim Hargett	8,698	41.06%
Total votes		21,182	100%
Republican hold			

=== 2012 ===
North Carolina House of Representatives 55th district Republican primary election, 2012
Party	Candidate	Votes	%
Republican	Mark Brody	3,892	47.60%
Republican	Richard Johnson	3,830	46.84%
Republican	John L. Barker	455	5.56%
Total votes		8,177	100%

North Carolina House of Representatives 55th district general election, 2012
Party	Candidate	Votes	%
Republican	Mark Brody	18,962	56.60%
Democratic	Dale Nelson	14,540	43.40%
Total votes		33,502	100%
Republican gain from Democratic			

=== 2008 ===
North Carolina House of Representatives 103rd district general election, 2008
Party	Candidate	Votes	%
Republican	Jim Gulley (incumbent)	20,798	69.37%
Unaffiliated	Mark Brody	9,184	30.63%
Total votes		29,982	100%
Republican hold			

North Carolina House of Representatives
Preceded by Winkie Wilkins	Member of the North Carolina House of Representatives from the 55th district 2013-Present	Incumbent
