= Hugh Blackwell =

American politician

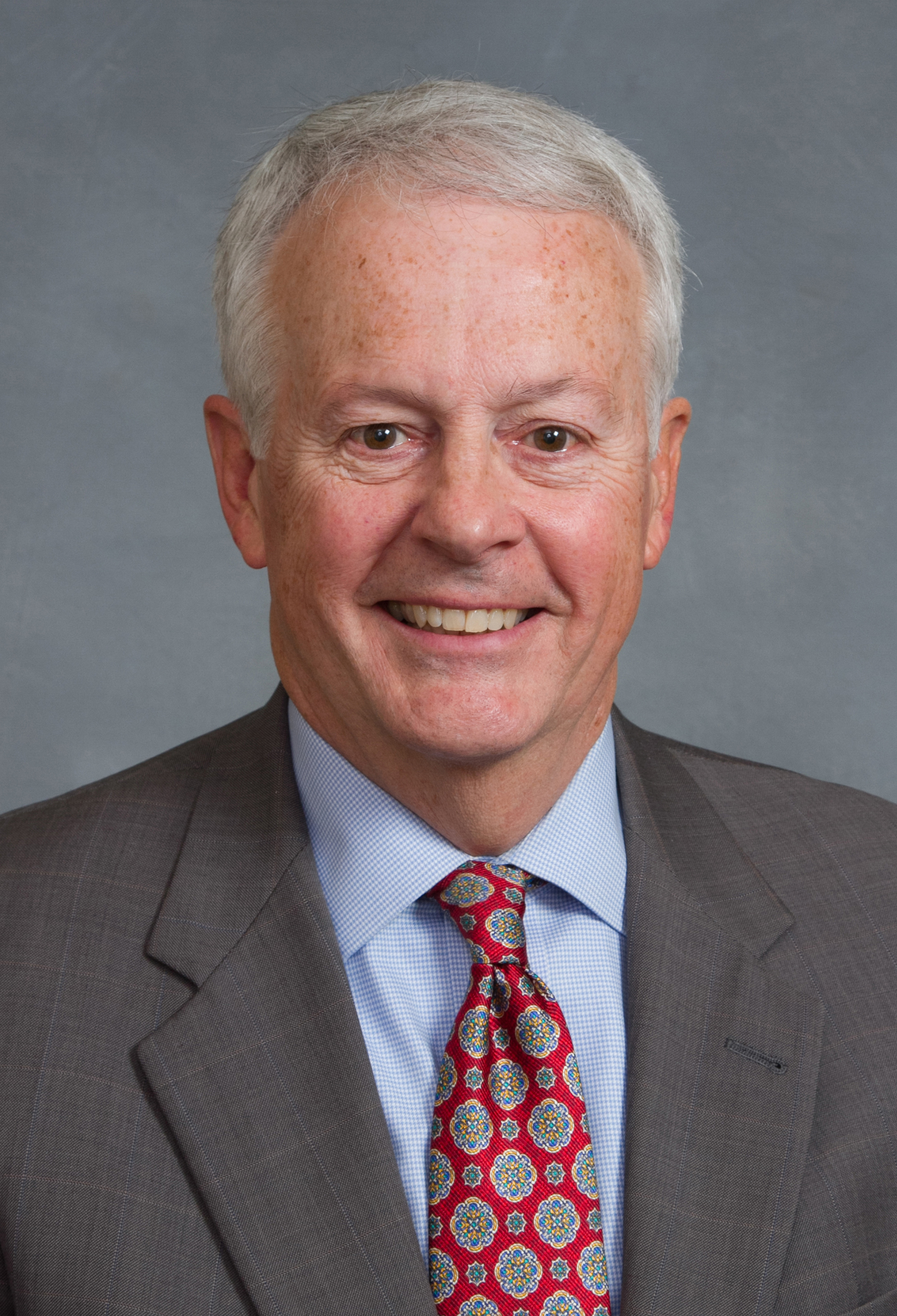

Member of the North Carolina House of Representatives from the 86th district
- Incumbent
- Assumed office January 28, 2009
- Preceded by: Walt Church

Personal details
- Born: Hugh Allen Blackwell; July 14, 1944 (age 82)
- Party: Republican
- Occupation: Attorney

Military service
- Branch/service: United States Army Reserve

Hugh Allen Blackwell (born July 14, 1944) is an American politician in Burke County, North Carolina. Blackwell is a member in the North Carolina House of Representatives, District 86, which covers half of Burke County. A Harvard Law School graduate, Hugh Blackwell is a partner in a law practice based in Valdese. Blackwell is a board of trustees member for Western Piedmont Community College in Morganton. He also served as a member on the Burke County School Board before pursuing a political career in state government.

== Honors ==
In 2018, Blackwell was listed as a Champion of the Family in the NC Values Coalition Scorecard.

== Electoral history ==
=== 2020 ===
North Carolina House of Representatives 86th district general election, 2020
Party	Candidate	Votes	%
Republican	Hugh Blackwell (incumbent)	27,154	69.88%
Democratic	Cecelia Surratt	11,705	30.12%
Total votes		38,859	100%
Republican hold			

=== 2018 ===
North Carolina House of Representatives 86th district general election, 2018
Party	Candidate	Votes	%
Republican	Hugh Blackwell (incumbent)	16,412	64.48%
Democratic	Tim Barnsback	9,039	35.52%
Total votes		25,451	100%
Republican hold			

=== 2016 ===
North Carolina House of Representatives 86th district general election, 2016
Party	Candidate	Votes	%
Republican	Hugh Blackwell (incumbent)	21,226	62.44%
Democratic	Tim Barnsback	12,766	37.56%
Total votes		33,992	100%
Republican hold			

=== 2014 ===
North Carolina House of Representatives 86th district Republican primary election, 2014
Party	Candidate	Votes	%
Republican	Hugh Blackwell (incumbent)	3,197	81.58%
Republican	A. Bradley Scott	722	18.42%
Total votes		3,919	100%

North Carolina House of Representatives 86th district general election, 2014
Party	Candidate	Votes	%
Republican	Hugh Blackwell (incumbent)	13,970	63.80%
Democratic	Jim Cates	7,926	36.20%
Total votes		21,896	100%
Republican hold			

=== 2012 ===
North Carolina House of Representatives 86th district general election, 2012
Party	Candidate	Votes	%
Republican	Hugh Blackwell (incumbent)	19,537	60.82%
Democratic	Jim Cates	12,584	39.18%
Total votes		32,121	100%
Republican hold			

=== 2010 ===
North Carolina House of Representatives 86th district general election, 2010
Party	Candidate	Votes	%
Republican	Hugh Blackwell (incumbent)	10,429	61.93%
Democratic	Walter Church Jr.	6,412	38.07%
Total votes		16,841	100%
Republican hold			

=== 2008 ===
North Carolina House of Representatives 86th district general election, 2008
Party	Candidate	Votes	%
Republican	Hugh Blackwell	14,140	51.61%
Democratic	Walt Church (incumbent)	13,259	48.39%
Total votes		27,399	100%
Republican gain from Democratic			

=== 2006 ===
North Carolina House of Representatives 86th district general election, 2006
Party	Candidate	Votes	%
Democratic	Walt Church (incumbent)	8,369	51.50%
Republican	Hugh Blackwell	7,883	48.50%
Total votes		16,252	100%
Democratic hold			

North Carolina House of Representatives
Preceded by Walt Church	Member of the North Carolina House of Representatives from the 86th district 2009–present	Incumbent
