= Ray Jeffers =

American politician

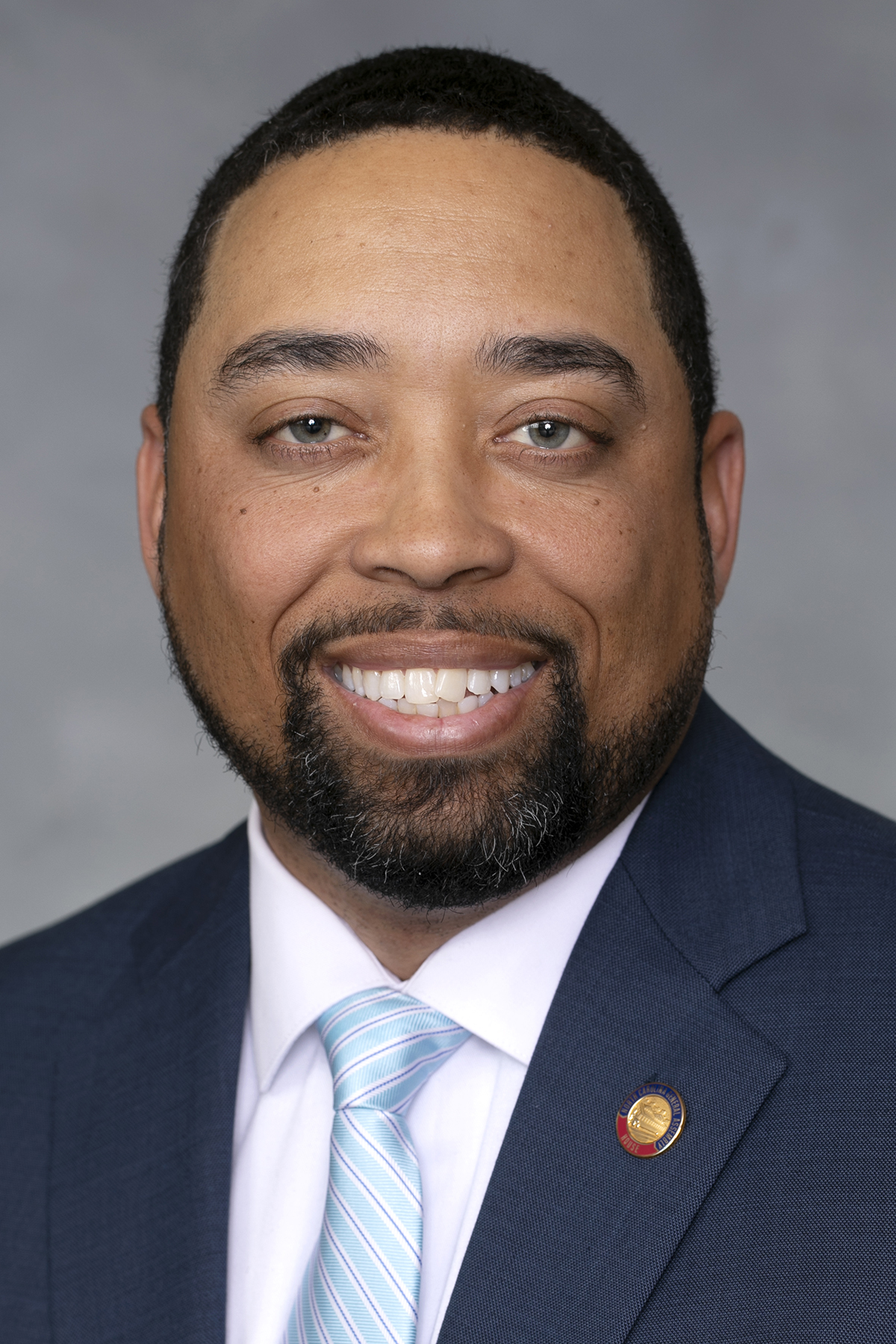
- Jeffers in 2023

Member of the North Carolina House of Representatives from the 2nd district
- Incumbent
- Assumed office January 1, 2023
- Preceded by: Larry Yarborough

Personal details
- Born: Brannon Ray Jeffers
- Party: Democratic
- Education: North Carolina Agricultural & Technical State University
- Occupation: Non-profit organization
- Website: Official website

Brannon Ray Jeffers an American politician who is a Democratic member of the North Carolina House of Representatives, representing the 2nd district (including all of Person County, as well as part of Durham County) since 2023. Jeffers previously served on the Person County Board of Commissioners from 2008 to 2020.

== Committee assignments ==
=== 2023-2024 session ===
- Appropriations
- Appropriations - Agriculture and Natural and Economic Resources
- Agriculture
- Local Government
- State Government

== Electoral history ==
=== 2022 ===
North Carolina House of Representatives 2nd district general election, 2022
Party	Candidate	Votes	%
Democratic	Ray Jeffers	19,692	54.57%
Republican	Larry Yarborough (incumbent)	15,674	43.44%
Libertarian	Gavin Bell	718	1.99%
Total votes		36,084	100%
Democratic gain from Republican			

=== 2020 ===
Person County Board of Commissioners general election, 2020
Party	Candidate	Votes	%
Republican	Gordon A. Powell (incumbent)	12,795	24.77%
Republican	Charlie Palmer	10,867	21.04%
Republican	Derrick Sims	10,614	20.55%
Democratic	Ray Jeffers (incumbent)	9,801	18.98%
Democratic	Cindy Martin	7,574	14.66%
Total votes		51,651	100%
Republican hold			
Republican gain from Democratic			
Republican gain from Democratic			

=== 2016 ===
Person County Board of Commissioners general election, 2016
Party	Candidate	Votes	%
Republican	Gordon A. Powell	10,876	22.87%
Democratic	Jimmy B. Clayton (incumbent)	10,214	21.48%
Democratic	Ray Jeffers (incumbent)	9,672	20.34%
Republican	David Newell Sr. (incumbent)	9,129	19.20%
Democratic	Donald Long	7,667	16.12%
Total votes		47,558	100%
Republican hold			
Democratic hold			
Democratic hold			

=== 2014 ===
North Carolina House of Representatives 2nd district Democratic primary election, 2014
Party	Candidate	Votes	%
Democratic	Ray Jeffers	2,862	43.82%
Democratic	Dalton L. Huff	1,887	28.89%
Democratic	Brent Groce	1,782	27.29%
Total votes		6,531	100%

North Carolina House of Representatives 2nd district general election, 2014
Party	Candidate	Votes	%
Republican	Larry Yarborough	13,423	56.68%
Democratic	Ray Jeffers	10,259	43.32%
Total votes		23,682	100%
Republican gain from Democratic			

=== 2012 ===
Person County Board of Commissioners general election, 2012
Party	Candidate	Votes	%
Democratic	Jimmy B. Clayton (incumbent)	10,718	26.88%
Democratic	Ray Jeffers (incumbent)	9,820	24.63%
Democratic	David Newell Sr.	9,754	24.46%
Republican	Larry Yarborough	9,579	24.02%
Total votes		39,871	100%
Democratic hold			
Democratic hold			
Democratic gain from Republican			

=== 2008 ===
Person County Board of Commissioners general election, 2008
Party	Candidate	Votes	%
Democratic	Jimmy B. Clayton	9,557	20.36%
Democratic	Ray Jeffers	7,460	15.90%
Republican	Sam Kennington	7,344	15.65%
Republican	Larry Yarborough (incumbent)	7,327	15.61%
Democratic	Samuel H. Winstead	6,754	14.39%
Republican	Gerry O"Neil	4,481	9.55%
Independent	Frances Blalock	4,006	8.54%
Total votes		46,929	100%

North Carolina House of Representatives
Preceded by Larry Yarborough	Member of the North Carolina House of Representatives from the 2nd district 2023–Present	Incumbent
