= North Carolina's 86th House district =

American legislative district

North Carolina's 86th State House of Representatives district
Representative
Hugh Blackwell; R–Valdese
- Demographics: 79% White; 6% Black; 8% Hispanic; 4% Asian; 3% Multiracial
- Population (2024): 87,795

North Carolina's 86th House district is one of 120 districts in the North Carolina House of Representatives. It has been represented by Republican Hugh Blackwell since 2009.

== Geography ==
Since 2023, the district has included all of Burke County. The district overlaps with the 46th Senate district.

== District officeholders ==
Representative	Party	Dates	Notes	Counties
District created January 1, 1993.
Raymond Thompson (Edenton)	Democratic	January 1, 1993 – April 23, 1993	Redistricted from the 1st district. Died.	1993–2003; All of Dare, Tyrrell, and Chowan counties Parts of Washington and Perquimans counties.
Vacant		April 23, 1993 – May 5, 1993		1993–2003; All of Dare, Tyrrell, and Chowan counties Parts of Washington and Perquimans counties.
Bill Culpepper (Edenton)	Democratic	May 5, 1993 – January 1, 2003	Appointed to finish Thompson's term. Redistricted to the 2nd district.	1993–2003; All of Dare, Tyrrell, and Chowan counties Parts of Washington and Perquimans counties.
Walt Church (Valdese)	Democratic	January 1, 2003 – January 1, 2009	Redistricted from the 47th district. Lost re-election.	2003–2023; Part of Burke County.
Hugh Blackwell (Valdese)	Republican	January 1, 2009 – Present		2003–2023; Part of Burke County.
Hugh Blackwell (Valdese)	Republican	January 1, 2009 – Present		2023–Present; All of Burke County.

== Election results ==
=== 2024 ===
North Carolina House of Representatives 86th district general election, 2024
Party	Candidate	Votes	%
Republican	Hugh Blackwell (incumbent)	32,134	72.05%
Democratic	Gena Singleton	12,467	27.95%
Total votes		44,601	100%
Republican hold			

=== 2022 ===
North Carolina House of Representatives 86th district general election, 2022
Party	Candidate	Votes	%
Republican	Hugh Blackwell (incumbent)	23,945	100%
Total votes		23,945	100%
Republican hold			

=== 2020 ===
North Carolina House of Representatives 86th district general election, 2020
Party	Candidate	Votes	%
Republican	Hugh Blackwell (incumbent)	27,154	69.88%
Democratic	Cecelia Surratt	11,705	30.12%
Total votes		38,859	100%
Republican hold			

=== 2018 ===
North Carolina House of Representatives 86th district Democratic primary election, 2018
Party	Candidate	Votes	%
Democratic	Tim Barnsback	1,318	76.72%
Democratic	Robert Griner	400	23.28%
Total votes		1,718	100%

North Carolina House of Representatives 86th district general election, 2018
Party	Candidate	Votes	%
Republican	Hugh Blackwell (incumbent)	16,412	64.48%
Democratic	Tim Barnsback	9,039	35.52%
Total votes		25,451	100%
Republican hold			

=== 2016 ===
North Carolina House of Representatives 86th district general election, 2016
Party	Candidate	Votes	%
Republican	Hugh Blackwell (incumbent)	21,226	62.44%
Democratic	Tim Barnsback	12,766	37.56%
Total votes		33,992	100%
Republican hold			

=== 2014 ===
North Carolina House of Representatives 86th district Republican primary election, 2014
Party	Candidate	Votes	%
Republican	Hugh Blackwell (incumbent)	3,197	81.58%
Republican	A. Bradley Scott	722	18.42%
Total votes		3,919	100%

North Carolina House of Representatives 86th district general election, 2014
Party	Candidate	Votes	%
Republican	Hugh Blackwell (incumbent)	13,970	63.80%
Democratic	Jim Cates	7,926	36.20%
Total votes		21,896	100%
Republican hold			

=== 2012 ===
North Carolina House of Representatives 86th district Democratic primary election, 2012
Party	Candidate	Votes	%
Democratic	Jim Cates	2,953	46.75%
Democratic	Dan DeHart	2,568	40.66%
Democratic	J. Pascal	795	12.59%
Total votes		6,316	100%

North Carolina House of Representatives 86th district general election, 2012
Party	Candidate	Votes	%
Republican	Hugh Blackwell (incumbent)	19,537	60.82%
Democratic	Jim Cates	12,584	39.18%
Total votes		32,121	100%
Republican hold			

=== 2010 ===
North Carolina House of Representatives 86th district Democratic primary election, 2010
Party	Candidate	Votes	%
Democratic	Walter Church Jr.	904	52.87%
Democratic	Jim Cates	806	47.13%
Total votes		1,710	100%

North Carolina House of Representatives 86th district general election, 2010
Party	Candidate	Votes	%
Republican	Hugh Blackwell (incumbent)	10,429	61.93%
Democratic	Walter Church Jr.	6,412	38.07%
Total votes		16,841	100%
Republican hold			

=== 2008 ===
North Carolina House of Representatives 86th district general election, 2008
Party	Candidate	Votes	%
Republican	Hugh Blackwell	14,140	51.61%
Democratic	Walt Church (incumbent)	13,259	48.39%
Total votes		27,399	100%
Republican gain from Democratic			

=== 2006 ===
North Carolina House of Representatives 86th district general election, 2006
Party	Candidate	Votes	%
Democratic	Walt Church (incumbent)	8,369	51.50%
Republican	Hugh Blackwell	7,883	48.50%
Total votes		16,252	100%
Democratic hold			

=== 2004 ===
North Carolina House of Representatives 86th district general election, 2004
Party	Candidate	Votes	%
Democratic	Walt Church (incumbent)	16,029	100%
Total votes		16,029	100%
Democratic hold			

=== 2002 ===
North Carolina House of Representatives 86th district general election, 2002
Party	Candidate	Votes	%
Democratic	Walt Church (incumbent)	11,586	59.10%
Republican	Earl A. Cook	8,019	40.90%
Total votes		19,605	100%
Democratic hold			

=== 2000 ===
North Carolina House of Representatives 86th district Democratic primary election, 2000
Party	Candidate	Votes	%
Democratic	Bill Culpepper (incumbent)	5,846	74.01%
Democratic	Charles H. Ward	2,053	25.99%
Total votes		7,899	100%

North Carolina House of Representatives 86th district general election, 2000
Party	Candidate	Votes	%
Democratic	Bill Culpepper (incumbent)	14,527	58.62%
Republican	Cheryl Boyd	10,255	41.38%
Total votes		24,782	100%
Democratic hold			
