= Rena Turner =

Rena W. Turner

Member of the North Carolina House of Representatives from the 84th district
- In office January 1, 2013 – June 27, 2019
- Preceded by: Constituency established
- Succeeded by: Jeffrey McNeely

Personal details
- Party: Republican
- Education: Lenoir-Rhyne University

Rena W. Turner is an American politician and teacher from Olin, North Carolina. She served as the Iredell County Clerk of Superior Court and as a member of the North Carolina House of Representatives.

== Political career ==
Turner represented North Carolina's 84th House district (covering part of Iredell County) from 2013 until she resigned on June 27, 2019.

=== Committee Assignments ===
==== 2017–2018 Session ====
- Aging (Chair)
- Judiciary I (Vice Chair)
- Appropriations (Vice Chair)
- Appropriations - Justice and Public Safety (Chair)
- Agriculture (Vice Chair)
- Education - K-12
- State Personnel
- Transportation

==== 2015–2016 Session ====
- Aging (Chair)
- Judiciary III (Vice Chair)
- Appropriations
- Appropriations - Justice and Public Safety
- Agriculture
- Education - K-12
- State Personnel
- Transportation

==== 2013–2014 Session ====
- Judiciary
- Agriculture
- Education
- State Personnel
- Government

=== Electoral History ===
==== 2018 ====
North Carolina House of Representatives 84th district general election, 2018
Party	Candidate	Votes	%
Republican	Rena Turner (incumbent)	20,483	68.90%
Democratic	Allen R. Edwards	9,246	31.10%
Total votes		29,729	100%
Republican hold			

==== 2016 ====
North Carolina House of Representatives 84th district Republican primary election, 2016
Party	Candidate	Votes	%
Republican	Rena Turner (incumbent)	7,841	63.77%
Republican	Kirk Sherrill	4,454	36.23%

North Carolina House of Representatives 84th district general election, 2016
Party	Candidate	Votes	%
Republican	Rena Turner (incumbent)	25,414	69.29%
Democratic	John Wayne Kahl	11,266	30.71%
Total votes		36,680	100%
Republican hold			

==== 2014 ====
North Carolina House of Representatives 84th district Republican primary election, 2014
Party	Candidate	Votes	%
Republican	Rena Turner (incumbent)	5,889	65.47%
Republican	Jay White	2,191	24.36%
Republican	Kirk Sherrill	915	10.17%

North Carolina House of Representatives 84th district general election, 2014
Party	Candidate	Votes	%
Republican	Rena Turner (incumbent)	17,136	69.59%
Democratic	Gene Mitchell Mahaffey	7,487	30.41%
Total votes		24,623	100%
Republican hold			

==== 2012 ====
North Carolina House of Representatives 84th district Republican primary election, 2012
Party	Candidate	Votes	%
Republican	Rena Turner	5,250	46.66%
Republican	Frank Mitchell	4,505	40.04%
Republican	Kirk Sherrill	1,497	13.30%
Total votes		11,252	100%

North Carolina House of Representatives 84th district general election, 2012
Party	Candidate	Votes	%
Republican	Rena Turner	23,284	65.27%
Democratic	Gene Mitchell Mahaffey	12,388	34.73%
Total votes		35,672	100%
Republican win (new seat)			

==== 2010 ====
Iredell County Clerk of Superior Court general election, 2010
Party	Candidate	Votes	%
Republican	Rena Turner (incumbent)	30,183	71.26%
Democratic	Erin Mendaloff-Green	12,174	28.74%
Total votes		42,357	100%
Republican hold			

==== 2006 ====
Iredell County Clerk of Superior Court general election, 2006
Party	Candidate	Votes	%
Republican	Rena Turner (incumbent)	21,412	100%
Total votes		21,412	100%
Republican hold			

North Carolina House of Representatives
Preceded by Phillip Frye	Member of the North Carolina House of Representatives from the 84th district 2013–2019	Succeeded by Jeffrey McNeely
