= Winkie Wilkins =

American politician from North Carolina

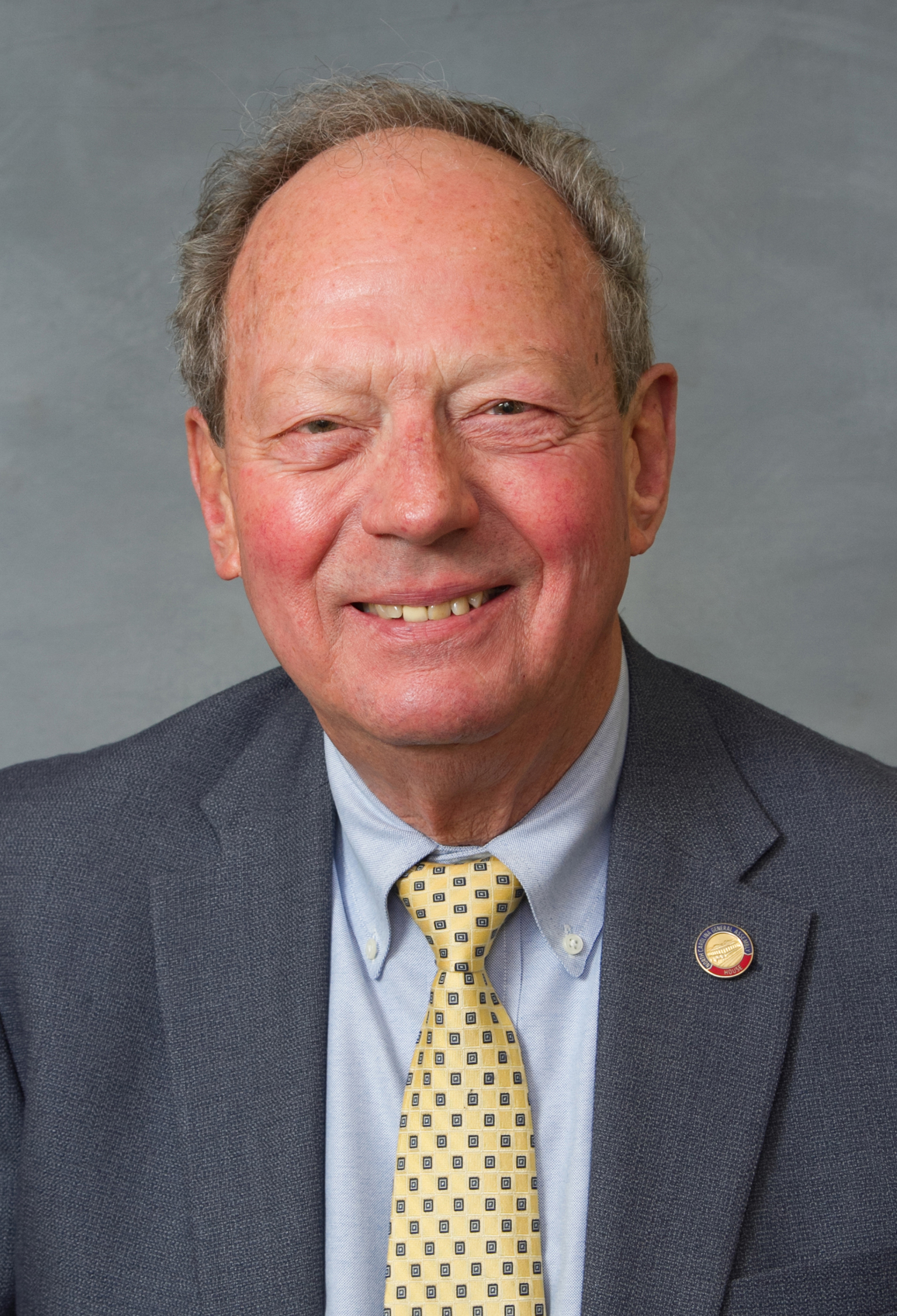

Member of the North Carolina House of Representatives
- In office January 1, 2005 – January 1, 2015
- Preceded by: Gordon Allen
- Succeeded by: Larry Yarborough
- Constituency: 55th District (2005–2013); 2nd District (2013–2015)

Personal details
- Born: January 31, 1941 (age 85) Roxboro, North Carolina, U.S.
- Party: Democratic
- Education: University of North Carolina
- Profession: Newspaper editor

W. A. "Winkie" Wilkins is a former Democratic member of the North Carolina General Assembly. He represented the 2nd House District (including constituents in Granville and Person counties) from January 2013 until December 2014. Citing his health, Wilkins announced in 2014 that he would not seek another term in the legislature.

Previously, before legislative redistricting, Wilkins represented the 55th House district from 2004 through 2012. That district included constituents in Durham and Person counties.

== Electoral history ==
=== 2012 ===
North Carolina House of Representatives 2nd district Democratic primary election, 2012
Party	Candidate	Votes	%
Democratic	Winkie Wilkins (incumbent)	6,000	55.72%
Democratic	Jim Crawford (incumbent)	3,977	36.93%
Democratic	Jason Jenkins	791	7.35%
Total votes		10,768	100%

North Carolina House of Representatives 2nd district general election, 2012
Party	Candidate	Votes	%
Democratic	Winkie Wilkins (incumbent)	20,398	56.68%
Republican	Timothy Karan	15,587	43.32%
Total votes		35,985	100%
Democratic hold			

=== 2010 ===
North Carolina House of Representatives 55th district Democratic primary election, 2010
Party	Candidate	Votes	%
Democratic	Winkie Wilkins (incumbent)	4,876	60.03%
Democratic	Fred Foster Jr.	2,899	35.69%
Democratic	R. Miles Standish	348	4.28%
Total votes		8,123	100%

North Carolina House of Representatives 55th district general election, 2010
Party	Candidate	Votes	%
Democratic	Winkie Wilkins (incumbent)	16,619	100%
Total votes		16,619	100%
Democratic hold			

=== 2008 ===
North Carolina House of Representatives 55th district general election, 2008
Party	Candidate	Votes	%
Democratic	Winkie Wilkins (incumbent)	27,774	100%
Total votes		27,774	100%
Democratic hold			

=== 2006 ===
North Carolina House of Representatives 55th district general election, 2006
Party	Candidate	Votes	%
Democratic	Winkie Wilkins (incumbent)	14,319	100%
Total votes		14,319	100%
Democratic hold			

=== 2004 ===
North Carolina House of Representatives 55th district general election, 2004
Party	Candidate	Votes	%
Democratic	Winkie Wilkins	22,524	88.91%
Libertarian	Tom Rose	2,810	11.09%
Total votes		25,334	100%
Democratic hold			

North Carolina House of Representatives
Preceded by Gordon Allen	Member of the North Carolina House of Representatives from the 55th district 2005–2013	Succeeded by Mark Brody
Preceded by Timothy Spear	Member of the North Carolina House of Representatives from the 2nd district 2013–2015	Succeeded by Larry Yarborough
