= 2020 North Carolina House of Representatives election =

North Carolina state election

- November 3, 2020

All 120 seats in the North Carolina House of Representatives 61 seats needed for a majority
- Turnout: 75.35% ▲22.37%
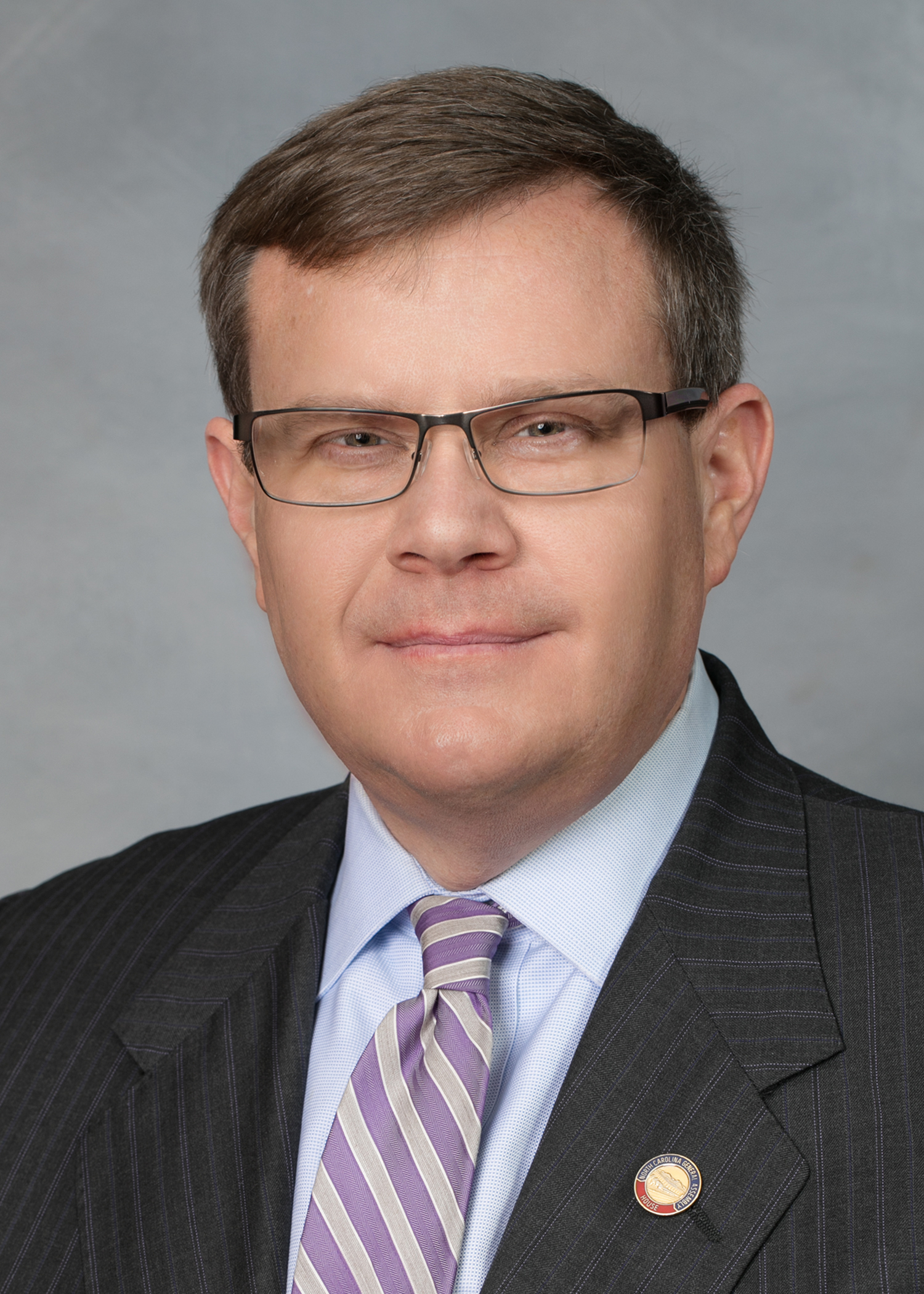

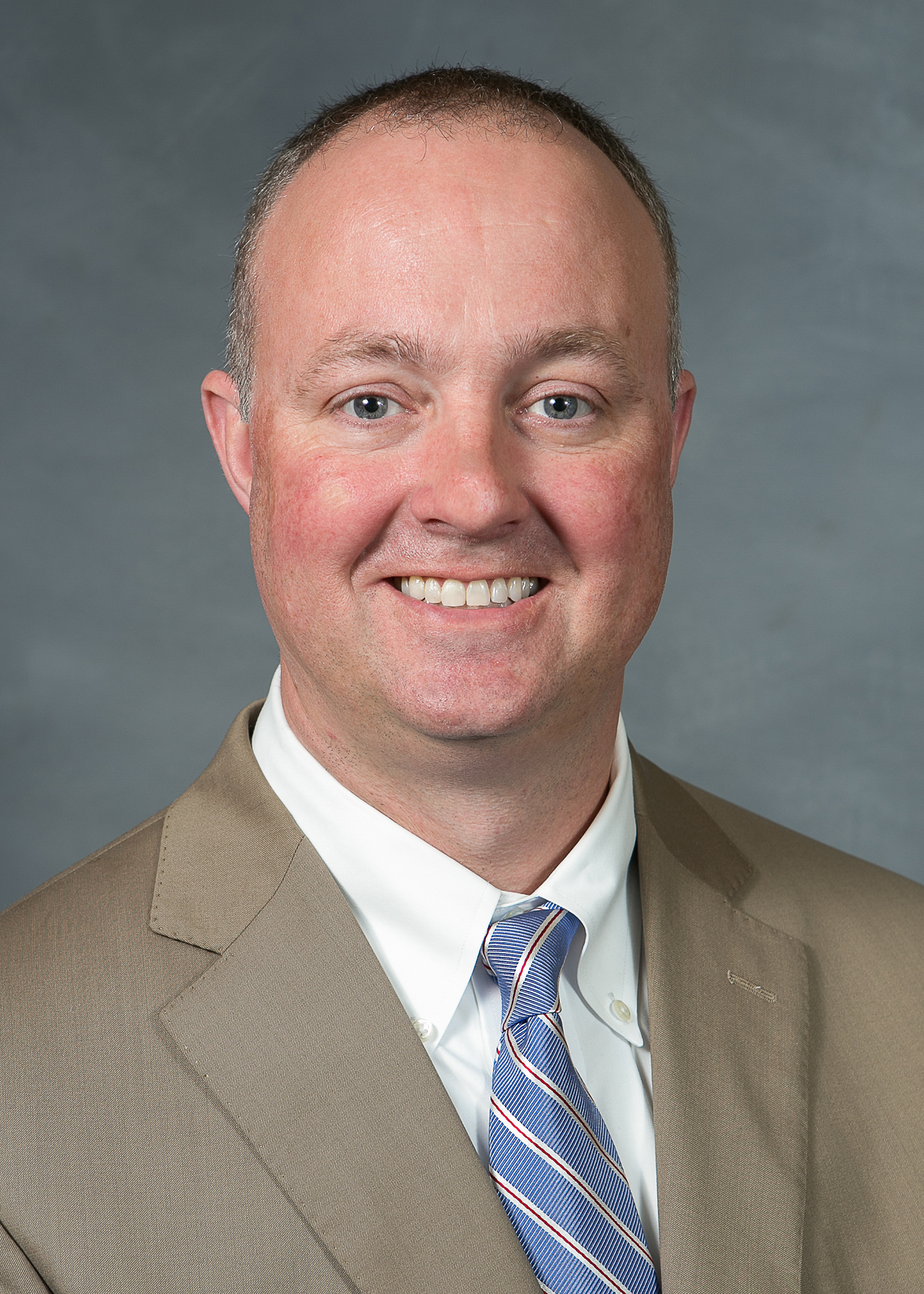
	Majority party	Minority party
Leader	Tim Moore	Darren Jackson
Party	Republican	Democratic
Leader since	January 14, 2015	January 11, 2017
Leader's seat	111th – Kings Mountain	39th – Raleigh
Last election	65 seats, 48.18%	55 seats, 50.54%
Seats after	69	51
Seat change	▲4	▼4
Popular vote	2,632,672	2,583,773
Percentage	49.99%	49.06%
Swing	▲1.81%	▼1.48%
- Republican hold Republican gain Democratic hold Democratic gain Republicans: 40-50% 50–60% 60–70% 70–80% >90% Democrats: 40–50% 50–60% 60-70% 70–80% 80–90% >90% Republicans: 40-50% 50-60% 60-70% 70-80% 80-90% 90-100% Democrats: 50-60% 60-70% 70-80% 80-90% 90-100%
Speaker before election
Tim Moore
Republican
Elected Speaker
Tim Moore
Republican

An election was held on November 3, 2020 to elect all 120 members to North Carolina's House of Representatives. The election coincided with the elections for other offices, including the Presidency, U.S Senate, Governor, U.S. House of Representatives, and state senate. The primary election was held on March 3, 2020 with a run-off on June 23, 2020.

== Background ==
In October 2020, The Washington Post identified this state election, along with the concurrent North Carolina Senate election, as one of eight whose outcomes could affect partisan balance during post-census redistricting. New districts are being used in this election.

== Predictions ==
Source	Ranking	As of
The Cook Political Report	Lean R	October 21, 2020

== Results summary ==
District	Incumbent	Party	Elected	Party
1st	Ed Goodwin	Rep	Ed Goodwin	Rep
2nd	Larry Yarborough	Rep	Larry Yarborough	Rep
3rd	Michael Speciale†	Rep	Steve Tyson	Rep
4th	Jimmy Dixon	Rep	Jimmy Dixon	Rep
5th	Howard Hunter III	Dem	Howard Hunter III	Dem
6th	Bobby Hanig	Rep	Bobby Hanig	Rep
7th	Lisa Stone Barnes†	Rep	Matthew Winslow	Rep
8th	Kandie Smith	Dem	Kandie Smith	Dem
9th	Perrin Jones	Rep	Brian Farkas	Dem
10th	John Bell	Rep	John Bell	Rep
11th	Allison Dahle	Dem	Allison Dahle	Dem
12th	Chris Humphrey	Rep	Chris Humphrey	Rep
13th	Pat McElraft	Rep	Pat McElraft	Rep
14th	George Cleveland	Rep	George Cleveland	Rep
15th	Phil Shepard	Rep	Phil Shepard	Rep
16th	Carson Smith	Rep	Carson Smith	Rep
17th	Frank Iler	Rep	Frank Iler	Rep
18th	Deb Butler	Dem	Deb Butler	Dem
19th	New Seat		Charlie Miller	Rep
20th	Ted Davis Jr. (Note: Redistricted from the 19th district.)	Rep	Ted Davis Jr.	Rep
20th	Holly Grange†	Rep	Ted Davis Jr.	Rep
21st	Raymond Smith Jr.	Dem	Raymond Smith Jr.	Dem
22nd	William Brisson	Rep	William Brisson	Rep
23rd	Shelly Willingham	Dem	Shelly Willingham	Dem
24th	Linda Cooper-Suggs	Dem	Linda Cooper-Suggs	Dem
25th	James Gailliard	Dem	James Gailliard	Dem
26th	Donna McDowell White	Rep	Donna McDowell White	Rep
27th	Michael Wray	Dem	Michael Wray	Dem
28th	Larry Strickland	Rep	Larry Strickland	Rep
29th	Vernetta Alston	Dem	Vernetta Alston	Dem
30th	Marcia Morey	Dem	Marcia Morey	Dem
31st	Zack Forde-Hawkins	Dem	Zack Forde-Hawkins	Dem
32nd	Terry Garrison	Dem	Terry Garrison	Dem
33rd	Rosa Gill	Dem	Rosa Gill	Dem
34th	Grier Martin	Dem	Grier Martin	Dem
35th	Terence Everitt	Dem	Terence Everitt	Dem
36th	Julie von Haefen	Dem	Julie von Haefen	Dem
37th	Sydney Batch	Dem	Erin Paré	Rep
38th	Yvonne Lewis Holley†	Dem	Abe Jones	Dem
39th	Darren Jackson	Dem	Darren Jackson	Dem
40th	Joe John	Dem	Joe John	Dem
41st	Gale Adcock	Dem	Gale Adcock	Dem
42nd	Marvin Lucas	Dem	Marvin Lucas	Dem
43rd	Elmer Floyd	Dem	Diane Wheatley	Rep
44th	Billy Richardson	Dem	Billy Richardson	Dem
45th	John Szoka	Rep	John Szoka	Rep
46th	Brenden Jones	Rep	Brenden Jones	Rep
47th	Charles Graham	Dem	Charles Graham	Dem
48th	Garland Pierce	Dem	Garland Pierce	Dem
49th	Cynthia Ball	Dem	Cynthia Ball	Dem
50th	Graig Meyer	Dem	Graig Meyer	Dem
51st	John Sauls	Rep	John Sauls	Rep
52nd	Jamie Boles	Rep	Jamie Boles	Rep
53rd	Howard Penny Jr.	Rep	Howard Penny Jr.	Rep
54th	Robert Reives	Dem	Robert Reives	Dem
55th	Mark Brody	Rep	Mark Brody	Rep
56th	Verla Insko	Dem	Verla Insko	Dem
57th	Ashton Clemmons	Dem	Ashton Clemmons	Dem
58th	Amos Quick	Dem	Amos Quick	Dem
59th	Jon Hardister	Rep	Jon Hardister	Rep
60th	Cecil Brockman	Dem	Cecil Brockman	Dem
61st	Pricey Harrison	Dem	Pricey Harrison	Dem
62nd	John Faircloth	Rep	John Faircloth	Rep
63rd	Stephen Ross	Rep	Ricky Hurtado	Dem
64th	Dennis Riddell	Rep	Dennis Riddell	Rep
65th	Jerry Carter	Rep	Jerry Carter	Rep
66th	Scott Brewer	Dem	Ben Moss	Rep
67th	Wayne Sasser	Rep	Wayne Sasser	Rep
68th	Craig Horn†	Rep	David Willis	Rep
69th	Dean Arp	Rep	Dean Arp	Rep
70th	Pat Hurley	Rep	Pat Hurley	Rep
71st	Evelyn Terry	Dem	Evelyn Terry	Dem
72nd	Derwin Montgomery†	Dem	Amber Baker	Dem
73rd	Lee Zachary	Rep	Lee Zachary	Rep
74th	Wes Schollander†	Rep	Jeff Zenger	Rep
75th	Donny Lambeth	Rep	Donny Lambeth	Rep
76th	Harry Warren	Rep	Harry Warren	Rep
77th	Julia Craven Howard	Rep	Julia Craven Howard	Rep
78th	Allen McNeill	Rep	Allen McNeill	Rep
79th	Keith Kidwell	Rep	Keith Kidwell	Rep
80th	Steve Jarvis†	Rep	Sam Watford	Rep
81st	Larry Potts	Rep	Larry Potts	Rep
82nd	Kristin Baker	Rep	Kristin Baker	Rep
83rd	Larry Pittman	Rep	Larry Pittman	Rep
84th	Jeffrey McNeely	Rep	Jeffrey McNeely	Rep
85th	Josh Dobson†	Rep	Dudley Greene	Rep
86th	Hugh Blackwell	Rep	Hugh Blackwell	Rep
87th	Destin Hall	Rep	Destin Hall	Rep
88th	Mary Belk	Dem	Mary Belk	Dem
89th	Mitchell Setzer	Rep	Mitchell Setzer	Rep
90th	Sarah Stevens	Rep	Sarah Stevens	Rep
91st	Kyle Hall	Rep	Kyle Hall	Rep
92nd	Chaz Beasley†	Dem	Terry Brown	Dem
93rd	Carl Ray Russell	Dem	Ray Pickett	Rep
94th	Jeffrey Elmore	Rep	Jeffrey Elmore	Rep
95th	John Fraley†	Rep	Grey Mills	Rep
96th	Jay Adams	Rep	Jay Adams	Rep
97th	Jason Saine	Rep	Jason Saine	Rep
98th	Christy Clark	Dem	John Bradford	Rep
99th	Nasif Majeed	Dem	Nasif Majeed	Dem
100th	John Autry	Dem	John Autry	Dem
101st	Carolyn Logan	Dem	Carolyn Logan	Dem
102nd	Becky Carney	Dem	Becky Carney	Dem
103rd	Rachel Hunt	Dem	Rachel Hunt	Dem
104th	Brandon Lofton	Dem	Brandon Lofton	Dem
105th	Wesley Harris	Dem	Wesley Harris	Dem
106th	Carla Cunningham	Dem	Carla Cunningham	Dem
107th	Kelly Alexander	Dem	Kelly Alexander	Dem
108th	John Torbett	Rep	John Torbett	Rep
109th	Dana Bumgardner	Rep	Dana Bumgardner	Rep
110th	Kelly Hastings	Rep	Kelly Hastings	Rep
111th	Tim Moore	Rep	Tim Moore	Rep
112th	David Rogers	Rep	David Rogers	Rep
113th	Jake Johnson	Rep	Jake Johnson	Rep
114th	Susan Fisher	Dem	Susan Fisher	Dem
115th	John Ager	Dem	John Ager	Dem
116th	Brian Turner	Dem	Brian Turner	Dem
117th	Tim Moffitt	Rep	Tim Moffitt	Rep
118th	Michele Presnell†	Rep	Mark Pless	Rep
119th	Joe Sam Queen	Dem	Mike Clampitt	Rep
120th	Kevin Corbin†	Rep	Karl Gillespie	Rep

† - Incumbent not seeking re-election

=== Statewide ===
Party	Candi- dates	Votes		Seats		
Party	Candi- dates	No.	%	No.	+/–	%
Republican Party	118	2,632,672	49.99%	69	▲4	57.5%
Democratic Party	119	2,583,773	49.06%	51	▼4	42.5%
Libertarian Party	14	42,333	0.80%	0	Steady	0.00%
Independent	2	7,242	0.14%	0	Steady	0.00%
Green Party	1	565	0.01%	0	Steady	0.00%
Write-in	1	50	0.00%	0	Steady	0.00%
Total	255	5,266,635	100.00%	120	Steady	100.00%

Popular vote
Republican	49.99%
Democratic	49.06%
Other	0.95%

House seats
Republican	57.5%
Democratic	42.5%

=== Close races ===
Districts where the margin of victory was under 10%:

1. District 63, 1.18% (gain)
2. District 45, 1.76%
3. District 9, 2.32% (gain)
4. District 74, 2.38%
5. District 83, 2.52%
6. District 37, 3.27% (gain)
7. District 98, 3.34% (gain)
8. District 43, 3.6% (gain)
9. District 59, 4.52%
10. District 47, 4.86%
11. District 35, 4.97%
12. District 24, 5.2%
13. District 82, 6%
14. District 21, 6%
15. District 93, 6.02% (gain)
16. District 17, 6.64%
17. District 25, 6.91%
18. District 104, 7.72%
19. District 1, 8.92%
20. District 119, 9.2% (gain)
21. District 12, 9.28%
22. District 105, 9.56%
23. District 103, 9.86%

=== Incumbents defeated in primary election ===
- Elmer Floyd (D-District 43), defeated by Kimberly Hardy (D)

=== Incumbents defeated in general election ===
- Perrin Jones (R-District 9), defeated by Brian Farkas (D)
- Sydney Batch (D-District 37), defeated by Erin Pare (R)
- Stephen Ross (R-District 63), defeated by Ricky Hurtado (D)
- Scott Brewer (D-District 66), defeated by Ben Moss (R)
- Carl Ray Russell (D-District 93), defeated by Ray Pickett (R)
- Christy Clark (D-District 98), defeated by John Bradford (R)
- Joe Sam Queen (D-District 119), defeated by Mike Clampitt (R)

=== Open seats that changed parties ===
- Elmer Floyd (D-District 43) lost re-nomination, seat won by Diane Wheatley (R)

=== Newly created seats ===
- District 19, won by Charlie Miller (R)

== Detailed results ==
=== Districts 1-19 ===
==== District 1 ====
Incumbent Republican Ed Goodwin has represented the 1st District since 2019.

North Carolina House of Representatives 1st district general election, 2020
Party	Candidate	Votes	%
Republican	Ed Goodwin (incumbent)	20,688	54.46%
Democratic	Emily Bunch Nicholson	17,299	45.54%
Total votes		37,987	100%
Republican hold			

==== District 2 ====
Incumbent Republican Larry Yarborough has represented the 2nd district since 2015.

North Carolina House of Representatives 2nd district general election, 2020
Party	Candidate	Votes	%
Republican	Larry Yarborough (incumbent)	25,928	60.40%
Democratic	Cindy Deporter	17,000	39.60%
Total votes		42,928	100%
Republican hold			

==== District 3 ====
Incumbent Republican Michael Speciale has represented the 3rd district since 2013. Speciale didn't seek re-election and fellow Republican Steve Tyson won the open seat.

North Carolina House of Representatives 3rd district general election, 2020
Party	Candidate	Votes	%
Republican	Steve Tyson	22,585	60.78%
Democratic	Dorothea Downing White	14,575	39.22%
Total votes		37,160	100%
Republican hold			

==== District 4 ====
Incumbent Republican Jimmy Dixon has represented the 4th district since 2011.

North Carolina House of Representatives 4th district general election, 2020
Party	Candidate	Votes	%
Republican	Jimmy Dixon (incumbent)	21,282	65.72%
Democratic	Christopher Schulte	11,099	34.28%
Total votes		32,381	100%
Republican hold			

==== District 5 ====
Incumbent Democratic Howard Hunter III has represented the 5th district since 2015.

North Carolina House of Representatives 5th district general election, 2020
Party	Candidate	Votes	%
Democratic	Howard Hunter III (incumbent)	20,061	56.71%
Republican	Donald Kirkland	15,314	43.29%
Total votes		35,375	100%
Democratic hold			

==== District 6 ====
Incumbent Republican Bobby Hanig has represented the 6th district since 2019.

North Carolina House of Representatives 6th district general election, 2020
Party	Candidate	Votes	%
Republican	Bobby Hanig (incumbent)	31,063	64.34%
Democratic	Tommy Fulcher	17,216	35.66%
Total votes		48,279	100%
Republican hold			

==== District 7 ====
Incumbent Republican Lisa Stone Barnes has represented the 7th district since 2019. Barnes sought election to the State Senate. Republican Matthew Winslow won the open seat.

North Carolina House of Representatives 7th district general election, 2020
Party	Candidate	Votes	%
Republican	Matthew Winslow	26,166	58.97%
Democratic	Phil Stover	18,208	41.03%
Total votes		44,374	100%
Republican hold			

==== District 8 ====
Incumbent Democrat Kandie Smith has represented the 8th district since 2019. Former state senator Tony Moore unsuccessfully challenged Smith.

North Carolina House of Representatives 8th district general election, 2020
Party	Candidate	Votes	%
Democratic	Kandie Smith (incumbent)	23,739	60.21%
Republican	Tony Moore	15,685	39.79%
Total votes		39,424	100%
Democratic hold			

==== District 9 ====
Incumbent Republican Perrin Jones has represented the 9th district since October 2019. Jones sought election to a full term, but he was defeated by 2016 Democratic nominee Brian Farkas.

North Carolina House of representatives 9th district general election, 2020
Party	Candidate	Votes	%
Democratic	Brian Farkas	19,198	51.16%
Republican	Perrin Jones (incumbent)	18,329	48.84%
Total votes		37,527	100%
Democratic gain from Republican			

==== District 10 ====
Incumbent Republican Majority Leader John Bell has represented the 10th district since 2013.

North Carolina House of Representatives 10th district general election, 2020
Party	Candidate	Votes	%
Republican	John Bell (incumbent)	27,802	69.77%
Democratic	Carl Martin	12,047	30.23%
Total votes		39,849	100%
Republican hold			

==== District 11 ====
Incumbent Democrat Allison Dahle has represented the 11th district since 2019.

North Carolina House of Representatives 11th district general election, 2020
Party	Candidate	Votes	%
Democratic	Allison Dahle (incumbent)	26,798	68.44%
Republican	Clark Pope	10,175	25.98%
Libertarian	Adrian Lee Travers	2,185	5.58%
Total votes		39,158	100%
Democratic hold			

==== District 12 ====
Incumbent Republican Chris Humphrey has represented the 12th district since 2019.

North Carolina House of Representatives 12th district general election, 2020
Party	Candidate	Votes	%
Republican	Chris Humphrey (incumbent)	19,732	54.64%
Democratic	Virginia Cox-Daugherty	16,383	45.36%
Total votes		36,115	100%
Republican hold			

==== District 13 ====
Incumbent Republican Pat McElraft has represented the 13th district since 2007.

North Carolina House of Representatives 13th district general election, 2020
Party	Candidate	Votes	%
Republican	Pat McElraft (incumbent)	33,477	71.65%
Democratic	Buck Bayliff	13,246	28.35%
Total votes		46,723	100%
Republican hold			

==== District 14 ====
Incumbent Republican George Cleveland has represented the 14th district since 2005.

North Carolina House of Representatives 14th district general election, 2020
Party	Candidate	Votes	%
Republican	George Cleveland (incumbent)	19,666	60.02%
Democratic	Marcy Wofford	13,100	39.98%
Total votes		32,266	100%
Republican hold			

==== District 15 ====
Incumbent Republican Phil Shepard has represented the 15th district since 2011.

North Carolina House of Representatives 15th district general election, 2020
Party	Candidate	Votes	%
Republican	Phil Shepard (incumbent)	17,818	69.49%
Democratic	Carolyn F. Gomas	7,824	30.51%
Total votes		25,642	100%
Republican hold			

==== District 16 ====
Incumbent Republican Carson Smith has represented the 16th district since 2019.

North Carolina House of Representatives 16th district general election, 2020
Party	Candidate	Votes	%
Republican	Carson Smith (incumbent)	30,161	64.40%
Democratic	Debbi Fintak	16,674	35.60%
Total votes		46,835	100%
Republican hold			

==== District 17 ====
Incumbent Republican Frank Iler has represented the 17th district since 2009.

North Carolina House of Representatives 17th district general election, 2020
Party	Candidate	Votes	%
Republican	Frank Iler (incumbent)	36,800	62.44%
Democratic	Tom Simmons	22,140	37.56%
Total votes		58,940	100%
Republican hold			

==== District 18 ====
Incumbent Democrat Deb Butler has represented the 18th district since 2017.

North Carolina House of Representatives 18th district general election, 2020
Party	Candidate	Votes	%
Democratic	Deb Butler (incumbent)	25,829	59.84%
Republican	Warren Kennedy	17,336	40.16%
Total votes		43,165	100%
Democratic hold			

==== District 19 ====
The new 19th district contains parts of Brunswick and New Hanover counties and had no incumbent. Republican Charlie Miller won the open seat.

North Carolina House of Representatives 19th district general election, 2020
Party	Candidate	Votes	%
Republican	Charlie Miller	34,259	57.96%
Democratic	Marcia Morgan	24,845	42.04%
Total votes		59,104	100%
Republican win (new seat)			

=== Districts 20-39 ===
==== District 20 ====
Incumbent Republican Holly Grange has represented the 20th district since 2016. Grange ran unsuccessfully Governor of North Carolina in the 2020 election, losing the Republican primary to Dan Forest. Republican Ted Davis Jr., who has represented the 19th district since 2012, successfully sought re-election.

North Carolina House of representavives 20th district general election, 2020
Party	Candidate	Votes	%
Republican	Ted Davis Jr. (incumbent)	28,119	55.33%
Democratic	Adam Ericson	22,703	44.67%
Total votes		50,822	100%
Republican hold			

==== District 21 ====
Incumbent Democrat Raymond Smith has represented the 21st district since 2019.

North Carolina House of Representatives 21st district general election, 2020
Party	Candidate	Votes	%
Democratic	Raymond Smith (incumbent)	17,632	53.00%
Republican	Brent Heath	15,633	47.00%
Total votes		33,265	100%
Democratic hold			

==== District 22 ====
Incumbent Republican William Brisson has represented the 22nd district since 2007.

North Carolina House of Representatives 22nd district general election, 2020
Party	Candidate	Votes	%
Republican	William Brisson (incumbent)	21,698	57.55%
Democratic	Albert D. Kirby, Jr.	16,002	42.45%
Total votes		37,700	100%
Republican hold			

==== District 23 ====
Incumbent Democrat Shelly Willingham has represented the 23rd district since 2015.

North Carolina House of Representatives 23rd district general election, 2020
Party	Candidate	Votes	%
Democratic	Shelly Willingham (incumbent)	21,754	58.76%
Republican	Claiborne Holtzman	14,656	39.59%
Green	Abbie (Bud) Lane	612	1.65%
Total votes		37,022	100%
Democratic hold			

==== District 24 ====
Incumbent Democrat Linda Cooper-Suggs has represented the 24th district since her appointment in July 2020. Copper-Suggs was elected to a full term.

North Carolina House of Representatives 24th district general election, 2020
Party	Candidate	Votes	%
Democratic	Linda Cooper-Suggs (incumbent)	20,928	52.60%
Republican	Mick Rankin	18,856	47.40%
Total votes		39,784	100%
Democratic hold			

==== District 25 ====
Incumbent Democrat James Gailliard has represented the 25th district since 2019.

North Carolina House of Representatives 25th district general election, 2020
Party	Candidate	Votes	%
Democratic	James Gailliard (incumbent)	22,364	51.62%
Republican	John M. Check	19,372	44.71%
Libertarian	Nick Taylor	1,589	3.67%
Total votes		43,325	100%
Democratic hold			

==== District 26 ====
Incumbent Republican Donna McDowell White has represented the 26th district since 2017.

North Carolina House of Representatives 26th district general election, 2020
Party	Candidate	Votes	%
Republican	Donna McDowell White (incumbent)	33,495	53.67%
Democratic	Linda Bennett	21,689	34.75%
Independent	Denton Lee	7,227	11.58%
Total votes		62,411	100%
Republican hold			

==== District 27 ====
Incumbent Democrat Michael Wray has represented the 27th district since 2005.

North Carolina House of Representatives 27th district general election, 2020
Party	Candidate	Votes	%
Democratic	Michael Wray (incumbent)	23,169	66.78%
Republican	Warren Scott Nail	11,527	33.22%
Total votes		34,696	100%
Democratic hold			

==== District 28 ====
Incumbent Republican Larry Strickland has represented the 28th district since 2017.

North Carolina House of Representatives district general election, 2020
Party	Candidate	Votes	%
Republican	Larry Strickland (incumbent)	29,510	67.70%
Democratic	Corey Stephens	14,082	32.30%
Total votes		43,592	100%
Republican hold			

==== District 29 ====
Incumbent Democrat Vernetta Alston has represented the 29th district since 2020. Alston was elected to a full term unopposed.

North Carolina House of Representatives 29th district general election, 2020
Party	Candidate	Votes	%
Democratic	Vernetta Alston (incumbent)	44,930	100.00%
Total votes		44,930	100%
Democratic hold			

==== District 30 ====
Incumbent Democrat Marcia Morey has represented the 30th district since 2017.

North Carolina House of Representatives 30th district general election, 2020
Party	Candidate	Votes	%
Democratic	Marcia Morey (incumbent)	41,548	81.68%
Libertarian	Gavin Bell	9,317	18.32%
Total votes		50,865	100%
Democratic hold			

==== District 31 ====
Incumbent Democrat Zack Forde-Hawkins has represented the 31st district since 2019. Forde-Hawkins defeated frequent Libertarian candidate Sean Haugh in the general election.

North Carolina House of Representatives 31st district general election, 2020
Party	Candidate	Votes	%
Democratic	Zack Forde-Hawkins (incumbent)	46,341	85.51%
Libertarian	Sean Haugh	7,850	14.49%
Total votes		54,191	100%
Democratic hold			

==== District 32 ====
Incumbent Democrat Terry Garrison has represented the 32nd district since 2017.

North Carolina House of Representatives district general election, 2020
Party	Candidate	Votes	%
Democratic	Terry Garrison (incumbent)	24,078	61.21%
Republican	David Woodson	15,260	38.79%
Total votes		39,338	100%
Democratic hold			

==== District 33 ====
Incumbent Democrat Rosa Gill has represented the 33rd district since 2009.

North Carolina House of Representatives 33rd district general election, 2020
Party	Candidate	Votes	%
Democratic	Rosa Gill (incumbent)	33,194	70.76%
Republican	Frann Sarpolus	11,659	24.85%
Libertarian	Sammie Brooks	2,057	4.38%
Total votes		46,910	100%
Democratic hold			

==== District 34 ====
Incumbent Democrat Grier Martin has represented the 34th district since 2013.

North Carolina House of Representatives 34th district general election, 2020
Party	Candidate	Votes	%
Democratic	Grier Martin (incumbent)	31,784	56.53%
Republican	Ronald L. Smith	21,989	39.11%
Libertarian	Michael Munger	2,449	4.36%
Total votes		56,222	100%
Democratic hold			

==== District 35 ====
Incumbent Democrat Terence Everitt has represented the 35th district since 2019.

North Carolina House of Representatives 35th district general election, 2020
Party	Candidate	Votes	%
Democratic	Terence Everitt (incumbent)	31,630	50.67%
Republican	Fred Von Canon	28,528	45.70%
Libertarian	Michael Nelson	2,262	3.63%
Total votes		62,420	100%
Democratic hold			

==== District 36 ====
Incumbent Democrat Julie von Haefen has represented the 36th district since 2019.

North Carolina House of Representatives 36th district general election, 2020
Party	Candidate	Votes	%
Democratic	Julie von Haefen (incumbent)	31,644	53.18%
Republican	Kim Coley	25,656	43.11%
Libertarian	Bruce Basson	2,206	3.71%
Total votes		59,506	100%
Democratic hold			

==== District 37 ====
Incumbent Democrat Sydney Batch has represented the 37th district since 2019.

North Carolina House of Representatives 37th district general election, 2020
Party	Candidate	Votes	%
Republican	Erin Paré	35,136	50.06%
Democratic	Sydney Batch (incumbent)	32,842	46.79%
Libertarian	Liam Leaver	2,208	3.15%
Total votes		70,186	100%
Republican gain from Democratic			

==== District 38 ====
Incumbent Democrat Yvonne Lewis Holley has represented the 38th district since 2013. Holley ran unsuccessfully for Lieutenant Governor in the 2020 election, thus she didn't seek re-election. Democrat Abe Jones won the open seat.

North Carolina House of Representatives 38th district general election, 2020
Party	Candidate	Votes	%
Democratic	Abe Jones	33,058	77.71%
Republican	Kenneth Bagnal	7,535	17.71%
Libertarian	Richard Haygood	1,949	4.58%
Total votes		42,542	100%
Democratic hold			

==== District 39 ====
Incumbent Democratic Minority Leader Darren Jackson has represented the 39th district since 2009. Jackson will be unopposed for re-election

North Carolina House of Representatives 39th district general election, 2020
Party	Candidate	Votes	%
Democratic	Darren Jackson (incumbent)	41,783	100.00%
Total votes		41,783	100%
Democratic hold			

=== Districts 40-59 ===
==== District 40 ====
Incumbent Democrat Joe John has represented the 40th district since 2017.

North Carolina House of Representatives 40th district general election, 2020
Party	Candidate	Votes	%
Democratic	Joe John (incumbent)	31,837	56.47%
Republican	Gerard Falzon	24,545	43.53%
Total votes		56,382	100%
Democratic hold			

==== District 41 ====
Incumbent Democrat Gale Adcock has represented the 41st district since 2015.

North Carolina House of Representatives 41st district general election, 2020
Party	Candidate	Votes	%
Democratic	Gale Adcock (incumbent)	40,934	61.99%
Republican	Scott Populorum	23,040	34.89%
Libertarian	Guy Meilleur	2,057	3.12%
Total votes		66,031	100%
Democratic hold			

==== District 42 ====
Incumbent Democrat Marvin Lucas has represented the 42nd district since 2001.

North Carolina House of Representatives 42nd district general election, 2020
Party	Candidate	Votes	%
Democratic	Marvin Lucas (incumbent)	19,024	67.39%
Republican	Jon Blake	9,206	32.61%
Total votes		28,230	100%
Democratic hold			

==== District 43 ====
Incumbent Democrat Elmer Floyd has represented the 43rd district since 2009. Floyd lost re-nomination to Kimberly Hardy. Republican Diane Wheatley defeated Hardy in the general election.

North Carolina House of Representatives 43rd district general election, 2020
Party	Candidate	Votes	%
Republican	Diane Wheatley	20,408	51.80%
Democratic	Kimberly Hardy	18,988	48.20%
Total votes		39,396	100%
Republican gain from Democratic			

==== District 44 ====
Incumbent Democrat William "Billy" Richardson has represented the 44th district since 2015.

North Carolina House of Representatives 44th district general election, 2020
Party	Candidate	Votes	%
Democratic	William "Billy" Richardson (incumbent)	25,412	71.86%
Republican	Heather S. Holmes	9,950	28.14%
Total votes		35,362	100%
Democratic hold			

==== District 45 ====
Incumbent Republican John Szoka has represented the 45th district since 2013.

North Carolina House of Representatives 45th district general election, 2020
Party	Candidate	Votes	%
Republican	John Szoka (incumbent)	20,260	50.88%
Democratic	Frances Vinell Jackson	19,557	49.12%
Total votes		39,817	100%
Republican hold			

==== District 46 ====
Incumbent Republican Brenden Jones has represented the 46th district since 2017.

North Carolina House of Representatives 46th district general election, 2020
Party	Candidate	Votes	%
Republican	Brenden Jones (incumbent)	17,555	60.69%
Democratic	Tim Heath	11,369	39.31%
Total votes		28,924	100%
Republican hold			

==== District 47 ====
Incumbent Democrat Charles Graham has represented the 47th district since 2011.

North Carolina House of Representatives 47th district general election, 2020
Party	Candidate	Votes	%
Democratic	Charles Graham (incumbent)	14,470	52.44%
Republican	Olivia Oxedine	13,126	47.56%
Total votes		27,596	100%
Democratic hold			

==== District 48 ====
Incumbent Democrat Garland Pierce has represented the 48th district since 2005.

North Carolina House of Representatives 48th district general election, 2020
Party	Candidate	Votes	%
Democratic	Garland Pierce (incumbent)	19,674	55.93%
Republican	Johnny H. Boyles	15,504	44.07%
Total votes		35,178	100%
Democratic hold			

==== District 49 ====
Incumbent Democrat Cynthia Ball has represented the 49th district since 2017.

North Carolina House of Representatives 49th district general election, 2020
Party	Candidate	Votes	%
Democratic	Cynthia Ball (incumbent)	37,807	65.05%
Republican	David Robertson	17,564	30.22%
Libertarian	Dee Watson	2,752	4.73%
Total votes		58,123	100%
Democratic hold			

==== District 50 ====
Incumbent Democrat Graig Meyer has represented the 50th district since 2013. Meyer is running for re-election unopposed.

North Carolina House of Represesntatives 50th district general election, 2020
Party	Candidate	Votes	%
Democratic	Graig Meyer (incumbent)	35,901	100.00%
Total votes		35,901	100%
Democratic hold			

==== District 51 ====
Incumbent Republican John Sauls has represented the 51st district since 2017.

North Carolina House of Representatives 51st district general election, 2020
Party	Candidate	Votes	%
Republican	John Sauls (incumbent)	22,628	57.33%
Democratic	Jason Cain	16,841	42.67%
Total votes		39,469	100%
Republican hold			

==== District 52 ====
Incumbent Republican Jamie Boles has represented the 52nd district since 2009.

North Carolina House of Representatives 52nd district general election, 2020
Party	Candidate	Votes	%
Republican	Jamie Boles (incumbent)	32,216	64.41%
Democratic	Lowell Simon	17,803	35.59%
Total votes		50,019	100%
Republican hold			

==== District 53 ====
Incumbent Republican Howard Penny Jr. has represented the 53rd district since his appointment on September 17, 2020. Penny was elected to his first full term.

North Carolina House of Representatives 53rd district general election, 2020
Party	Candidate	Votes	%
Republican	Howard Penny Jr. (incumbent)	26,228	60.97%
Democratic	Sally Weeks Benson	15,129	35.17%
Libertarian	Zach Berly	1,658	3.85%
Total votes		43,015	100%
Republican hold			

==== District 54 ====
Incumbent Democrat Robert Reives II has represented the 54th district since 2014.

North Carolina House of Representatives 54th district general election, 2020
Party	Candidate	Votes	%
Democratic	Robert Reives II (incumbent)	37,825	61.22%
Republican	George T. Gilson, Jr.	23,957	38.78%
Total votes		61,782	100%
Democratic hold			

==== District 55 ====
Incumbent Republican Mark Brody has represented the 55th district since 2013.

North Carolina House of Representatives 55th district general election, 2020
Party	Candidate	Votes	%
Republican	Mark Brody (incumbent)	20,800	58.32%
Democratic	Gloria Harrington Overcash	14,865	41.68%
Total votes		35,665	100%
Republican hold			

==== District 56 ====
Incumbent Democrat Verla Insko has represented the 56th district since 1997. Insko is seeking re-election unopposed.

North Carolina House of Representatives 56th district general election, 2020
Party	Candidate	Votes	%
Democratic	Verla Insko (incumbent)	38,428	100.00%
Total votes		38,428	100%
Democratic hold			

==== District 57 ====
Incumbent Democrat Ashton Clemmons has represented the 57th district since 2019.

North Carolina House of Representatives 57th district general election, 2020
Party	Candidate	Votes	%
Democratic	Ashton Clemmons (incumbent)	31,138	68.34%
Republican	Chris Meadows	14,427	31.66%
Total votes		45,565	100%
Democratic hold			

==== District 58 ====
Incumbent Democrat Amos Quick has represented the 58th district since 2017.

North Carolina House of Representatives 58th district general election, 2020
Party	Candidate	Votes	%
Democratic	Amos Quick (incumbent)	28,943	76.16%
Republican	Clinton Honey	9,060	23.84%
Total votes		38,003	100%
Democratic hold			

==== District 59 ====
Incumbent Republican Jon Hardister has represented the 59th district since 2013.

North Carolina House of Representatives 59th district general election, 2020
Party	Candidate	Votes	%
Republican	Jon Hardister (incumbent)	28,474	52.26%
Democratic	Nicole Quick	26,016	47.74%
Total votes		54,500	100%
Republican hold			

=== Districts 60-79 ===
==== District 60 ====
Incumbent Democrat Cecil Brockman has represented the 60th district since 2015.

North Carolina House of Representatives 60th district general election, 2020
Party	Candidate	Votes	%
Democratic	Cecil Brockman (incumbent)	25,120	64.06%
Republican	Frank Ragsdale	14,094	35.64%
Total votes		39,214	100%
Democratic hold			

==== District 61 ====
Incumbent Democrat Pricey Harrison has represented the 61st district and its predecessors since 2005. Harrison is seeking re-election unopposed.

North Carolina House of Representatives 61st district general election, 2020
Party	Candidate	Votes	%
Democratic	Pricey Harrison (incumbent)	33,983	100.00%
Total votes		33,983	100%
Democratic hold			

==== District 62 ====
Incumbent Republican John Faircloth has represented the 62nd district and its predecessors since 2011.

North Carolina House of Representatives 62nd district general election, 2020
Party	Candidate	Votes	%
Republican	John Faircloth (incumbent)	30,735	57.41%
Democratic	Brandon Gray	22,801	42.59%
Total votes		53,536	100%
Republican hold			

==== District 63 ====
Incumbent Republican Stephen Ross has represented the 63rd District since 2013. Ross lost re-election to Democrat Ricky Hurtado.

North Carolina House of Representatives 63rd district general election, 2020
Party	Candidate	Votes	%
Democratic	Ricky Hurtado	20,584	50.59%
Republican	Stephen Ross (incumbent)	20,107	49.41%
Total votes		40,691	100%
Democratic gain from Republican			

==== District 64 ====
Incumbent Republican Dennis Riddell has represented the 64th District since 2013.

North Carolina House of Representatives 64th district general election, 2020
Party	Candidate	Votes	%
Republican	Dennis Riddell (incumbent)	26,103	59.48%
Democratic	Eric Henry	17,786	40.52%
Total votes		43,889	100%
Republican hold			

==== District 65 ====
Incumbent Republican Jerry Carter has represented the 65th district since 2019.

North Carolina House of Representatives 65th district general election, 2020
Party	Candidate	Votes	%
Republican	Jerry Carter (incumbent)	26,784	64.74%
Democratic	Amanda Joann Bell	14,590	35.26%
Total votes		41,734	100%
Republican hold			

==== District 66 ====
Incumbent Democrat Scott Brewer has represented the 66th District since his appointment in May 2019. Brewer sought election to a full term in office, but he was defeated by Republican Ben Moss.

North Carolina House of Representatives 66th district general election, 2020
Party	Candidate	Votes	%
Republican	Ben Moss	22,093	59.90%
Democratic	Scott Brewer (incumbent)	14,731	40.10%
Total votes		36,824	100%
Republican gain from Democratic			

==== District 67 ====
Incumbent Wayne Sasser has represented the 67th District since 2019. Sasser is unopposed for re-election.

North Carolina House of Representatives 67th district general election, 2020
Party	Candidate	Votes	%
Republican	Wayne Sasser (incumbent)	41,210	100.00%
Total votes		41,210	100%
Republican hold			

==== District 68 ====
Incumbent Republican Craig Horn has represented the 68th District since 2011. Horn ran unsuccessfully Superintendent of Public Instruction, losing the Republican nomination to Catherine Truitt. Republican David Willis won the open seat.

North Carolina House of Representatives 68th district general election, 2020
Party	Candidate	Votes	%
Republican	David Willis	36,413	62.99%
Democratic	Ericka L. McKnight	21,394	37.01%
Total votes		57,807	100%
Republican hold			

==== District 69 ====
Incumbent Republican Dean Arp has represented the 69th District since 2013.

North Carolina House of Representatives 69th district general election, 2020
Party	Candidate	Votes	%
Republican	Dean Arp (incumbent)	27,981	64.94%
Democratic	Pam De Maria	15,106	35.06%
Total votes		43,087	100%
Republican hold			

==== District 70 ====
Incumbent Republican Pat Hurley has represented the 70th District since 2007.

North Carolina House of Representatives 70th district general election, 2020
Party	Candidate	Votes	%
Republican	Pat Hurley (incumbent)	28,546	75.87%
Democratic	Susan Lee (Susie) Scott	9,080	24.13%
Total votes		37,626	100%
Republican hold			

==== District 71 ====
Incumbent Democrat Evelyn Terry has represented the 71st District since 2013. Terry is seeking re-election unopposed.

North Carolina House of Representatives 71st district general election, 2020
Party	Candidate	Votes	%
Democratic	Evelyn Terry (incumbent)	28,471	100.00%
Total votes		28,471	100%
Democratic hold			

==== District 72 ====
Incumbent Democrat Derwin Montgomery has represented the 72nd District since 2018. Montgomery sought election to the U.S House of Representatives, losing the Democratic nomination for the 6th district to Kathy Manning. Democrat Amber Baker won the open seat.

North Carolina House of Representatives 72nd district general election, 2020
Party	Candidate	Votes	%
Democratic	Amber Baker	29,524	71.33%
Republican	Dan Lawlor	11,868	28.67%
Total votes		41,392	100%
Democratic hold			

==== District 73 ====
Incumbent Republican Lee Zachary has represented the 73rd District since 2015.

North Carolina House of Representatives 73rd district general election, 2020
Party	Candidate	Votes	%
Republican	Lee Zachary (incumbent)	24,703	64.54%
Democratic	William Stinson	13,570	35.46%
Total votes		38,273	100%
Republican hold			

==== District 74 ====
Incumbent Republican Wes Schollander has represented the 74th District since his appointment on August 19, 2020. Schollander didn't seek re-election and Republican Jeff Zenger won the open seat.

North Carolina House of Representatives 74th district general election, 2020
Party	Candidate	Votes	%
Republican	Jeff Zenger	27,843	51.19%
Democratic	Dan Besse	26,550	48.81%
Total votes		54,393	100%
Republican hold			

==== District 75 ====
Incumbent Republican Donny Lambeth has represented the 75th District since 2013.

North Carolina House of Representatives 75th district general election, 2020
Party	Candidate	Votes	%
Republican	Donny Lambeth (incumbent)	26,693	60.31%
Democratic	Elisabeth Motsinger	17,564	39.69%
Total votes		44,257	100%
Republican hold			

==== District 76 ====
Incumbent Republican Harry Warren has represented the 76th district and its predecessors since 2011.

North Carolina House of Representatives 76th district general election, 2020
Party	Candidate	Votes	%
Republican	Harry Warren (incumbent)	25,479	61.06%
Democratic	Al Heggins	16,250	38.94%
Total votes		41,729	100%
Republican hold			

==== District 77 ====
Incumbent Republican Julia Craven Howard has represented the 79th district and its predecessors since 1989.

North Carolina House of Representatives 77th district general election, 2020
Party	Candidate	Votes	%
Republican	Juila Craven Howard (incumbent)	35,222	74.65%
Democratic	Keith Townsend	11,963	25.35%
Total votes		47,185	100%
Republican hold			

==== District 78 ====
Incumbent Republican Allen McNeill has represented the 78th District since 2012. McNeill is unopposed for re-election.

North Carolina House of Representatives 78th district general election, 2020
Party	Candidate	Votes	%
Republican	Allen McNeill (incumbent)	33,593	100.00%
Total votes		33,593	100%
Republican hold			

==== District 79 ====
Incumbent Republican Keith Kidwell has represented the 79th district since 2019.

North Carolina House of Representatives 79th district general election, 2020
Party	Candidate	Votes	%
Republican	Keith Kidwell (incumbent)	25,290	63.83%
Democratic	Nick Blount	14,330	36.17%
Total votes		39,620	100%
Republican hold			

=== Districts 80-99 ===
==== District 80 ====
Incumbent Republican Steve Jarvis has represented the 80th District since 2019. Jarvis successfully sought election to the State Senate. Former representative Sam Watford won the open seat.

North Carolina House of Representatives 80th district general election, 2020
Party	Candidate	Votes	%
Republican	Sam Watford	32,611	75.21%
Democratic	Wendy Sellars	10,748	24.79%
Total votes		43,359	100%
Republican hold			

==== District 81 ====
Incumbent Republican Larry Potts has represented the 81st District since 2017.

North Carolina House of Representatives 81st district general election, 2020
Party	Candidate	Votes	%
Republican	Larry Potts (incumbent)	32,092	73.00%
Democratic	Robert Lewis Jordan	11,872	27.00%
Total votes		43,964	100%
Republican hold			

==== District 82 ====
Incumbent Republican Kristin Baker has represented the 82nd district since her appointment in March 2020. Baker was elected to a full term.

North Carolina House of Representatives 82nd district general election, 2020
Party	Candidate	Votes	%
Republican	Kristin Baker (incumbent)	25,817	53.00%
Democratic	Aimy Steele	22,898	47.00%
Total votes		48,715	100%
Republican hold			

==== District 83 ====
Incumbent Republican Larry Pittman has represented the 83rd district and its predecessors since 2011.

North Carolina House of Representatives 83rd district general election, 2020
Party	Candidate	Votes	%
Republican	Larry Pittman (incumbent)	27,904	51.26%
Democratic	Gail Young	26,534	48.74%
Total votes		54,438	100%
Republican hold			

==== District 84 ====
Incumbent Republican Jeffrey McNeely has represented the 84th District since his appointment on July 5, 2019. McNeely was elected to a full term.

North Carolina House of Representatives 84th district general election, 2020
Party	Candidate	Votes	%
Republican	Jeffrey McNeely (incumbent)	29,630	69.12%
Democratic	Gayle Wesley Harris	13,235	30.88%
Total votes		42,865	100%
Republican hold			

==== District 85 ====
Incumbent Republican Josh Dobson has represented the 85th District since 2013. Dobson successfully sought election to become the NC Commissioner of Labor. Republican Dudley Greene won the open seat.

North Carolina House of Representatives 85th district general election, 2020
Party	Candidate	Votes	%
Republican	Dudley Greene	31,073	77.48%
Democratic	Ted Remington	9,031	22.52%
Total votes		42,865	100%
Republican hold			

==== District 86 ====
Incumbent Republican Hugh Blackwell has represented the 86th District since 2009.

North Carolina House of Representatives 86th district general election, 2020
Party	Candidate	Votes	%
Republican	Hugh Blackwell (incumbent)	27,154	69.88%
Democratic	Cecelia Surratt	11,705	30.12%
Total votes		38,859	100%
Republican hold			

==== District 87 ====
Incumbent Republican Destin Hall has represented the 87th District since 2017.

North Carolina House of Representatives 87th district general election, 2020
Party	Candidate	Votes	%
Republican	Destin Hall (incumbent)	31,830	76.93%
Democratic	Corie Schreiber	9,544	23.07%
Total votes		41,374	100%
Republican hold			

==== District 88 ====
Incumbent Democrat Mary Belk has represented the 88th District since 2017.

North Carolina House of Representatives 88th district general election, 2020
Party	Candidate	Votes	%
Democratic	Mary Belk (incumbent)	31,647	63.11%
Republican	David Tondreau	18,497	36.89%
Total votes		50,144	100%
Democratic hold			

==== District 89 ====
Incumbent Republican Mitchell Setzer has represented the 89th District and its predecessors since 1999.

North Carolina House of Representatives 89th district general election, 2020
Party	Candidate	Votes	%
Republican	Mitchell Setzer (incumbent)	31,044	74.35%
Democratic	Greg Cranford	10,711	25.65%
Total votes		41,755	100%
Republican hold			

==== District 90 ====
Incumbent Republican Sarah Stevens has represented the 90th District since 2009.

North Carolina House of Representatives 90th district general election, 2020
Party	Candidate	Votes	%
Republican	Sarah Stevens (incumbent)	30,028	74.57%
Democratic	Beth Shaw	10,242	25.43%
Total votes		40,270	100%
Republican hold			

==== District 91 ====
Incumbent Republican Kyle Hall has represented the 91st District since 2015.

North Carolina House of Representatives 91st district general election, 2020
Party	Candidate	Votes	%
Republican	Kyle Hall (incumbent)	33,534	78.38%
Democratic	Rita Cruise	9,252	21.62%
Total votes		42,786	100%
Republican hold			

==== District 92 ====
Incumbent Democrat Chaz Beasley has represented the 92nd District since 2017. Beasley ran unsuccessfully for Lieutenant Governor of North Carolina in the 2020 election, losing the Democratic nomination to Yvonne Lewis Holley. Democrat Terry Brown won the open seat.

North Carolina House of Representatives 92nd district general election, 2020
Party	Candidate	Votes	%
Democratic	Terry Brown	34,990	72.91%
Republican	Jerry Munden	12,998	27.09%
Total votes		47,988	100%
Democratic hold			

==== District 93 ====
Incumbent Democrat Carl Ray Russell has represented the 93rd district since 2019. Russell lost re-election to Republican Ray Pickett.

North Carolina House of Representatives 93rd district general election, 2020
Party	Candidate	Votes	%
Republican	Ray Pickett	24,680	53.01%
Democratic	Carl Ray Russell (incumbent)	21,875	46.99%
Total votes		46,555	100%
Republican gain from Democratic			

==== District 94 ====
Incumbent Republican Jeffrey Elmore has represented the 94th District since 2013.

North Carolina House of Representatives 94th district general election, 2020
Party	Candidate	Votes	%
Republican	Jeffrey Elmore (incumbent)	36,696	100.00%
Total votes		36,696	100%
Republican hold			

==== District 95 ====
Incumbent Republican John Fraley has represented the 95th District since 2015. Fraley didn't seek re-election and former Republican representative Grey Mills won the open seat.

North Carolina House of Representatives 95th district general election, 2020
Party	Candidate	Votes	%
Republican	Grey Mills	36,557	65.69%
Democratic	Amanda Brown Kotis	19,098	34.31%
Total votes		55,655	100%
Republican hold			

==== District 96 ====
Incumbent Republican Jay Adams has represented the 96th District since 2015.

North Carolina House of Representatives 96th district general election, 2020
Party	Candidate	Votes	%
Republican	Jay Adams (incumbent)	25,370	62.95%
Democratic	Kim Bost	14,929	37.05%
Total votes		40,299	100%
Republican hold			

==== District 97 ====
Incumbent Republican Jason Saine has represented the 97th District since 2011.

North Carolina House of Representatives 97th district general election, 2020
Party	Candidate	Votes	%
Republican	Jason Saine (incumbent)	35,988	74.13%
Democratic	Greg McBryde	12,558	25.87%
Total votes		48,546	100%
Republican hold			

==== District 98 ====
Incumbent Democrat Christy Clark has represented the 98th district since 2019. Republican John Bradford defeated Clark in a rematch of the 2018 election.

North Carolina House of Representatives 98th district general election, 2020
Party	Candidate	Votes	%
Republican	John Bradford	31,793	51.67%
Democratic	Christy Clark (incumbent)	29,743	48.33%
Total votes		61,536	100%
Republican gain from Democratic			

==== District 99 ====
Incumbent Democrat Nasif Majeed has represented the 99th District since 2019.

North Carolina House of Representatives 99th district general election, 2020
Party	Candidate	Votes	%
Democratic	Nasif Majeed (incumbent)	28,226	64.57%
Republican	Russell Rowe	15,486	35.43%
Total votes		43,712	100%
Democratic hold			

=== Districts 100-120 ===
==== District 100 ====
Incumbent Democrat John Autry has represented the 100th District since 2017.

North Carolina House of Representatives 100th district general election, 2020
Party	Candidate	Votes	%
Democratic	John Autry (incumbent)	23,805	71.94%
Republican	Kalle Thompson	9,285	28.06%
Total votes		33,090	100%
Democratic hold			

==== District 101 ====
Incumbent Democrat Carolyn Logan has represented the 101st District since 2019.

North Carolina House of Representatives 101st district general election, 2020
Party	Candidate	Votes	%
Democratic	Carolyn Logan (incumbent)	31,646	73.89%
Republican	Steve Mauney	11,183	26.11%
Total votes		42,829	100%
Democratic hold			

==== District 102 ====
Incumbent Democrat Becky Carney has represented the 102nd District since 2003.

North Carolina House of Representatives 102nd district general election, 2020
Party	Candidate	Votes	%
Democratic	Becky Carney (incumbent)	34,931	78.44%
Republican	Kyle Kirby	9,599	21.56%
Total votes		44,530	100%
Democratic hold			

==== District 103 ====
Incumbent Democrat Rachel Hunt has represented the 103rd District since 2019. Republican Bill Brawley ran unsuccessfully for the 103rd district again, after losing to Hunt in the 2018 election.

North Carolina House of Representatives 103rd district general election, 2020
Party	Candidate	Votes	%
Democratic	Rachel Hunt (incumbent)	26,818	54.93%
Republican	Bill Brawley	22,008	45.07%
Total votes		48,826	100%
Democratic hold			

==== District 104 ====
Incumbent Democrat Brandon Lofton has represented the 104th District since 2019.

North Carolina House of Representatives 104th district general election, 2020
Party	Candidate	Votes	%
Democratic	Brandon Lofton (incumbent)	25,513	53.86%
Republican	Don Pomeroy	21,854	46.14%
Total votes		47,367	100%
Democratic hold			

==== District 105 ====
Incumbent Democrat Wesley Harris has represented the 105th District since 2019.

North Carolina House of Representatives 105th district general election, 2020
Party	Candidate	Votes	%
Democratic	Wesley Harris (incumbent)	25,732	54.78%
Republican	Amy Bynum	21,245	45.22%
Total votes		46,977	100%
Democratic hold			

==== District 106 ====
Incumbent Democrat Carla Cunningham has represented the 106th District since 2013. Cunningham is seeking re-election unopposed.

North Carolina House of Representatives 106th district general election, 2020
Party	Candidate	Votes	%
Democratic	Carla Cunningham (incumbent)	34,510	100.00%
Total votes		34,510	100%
Democratic hold			

==== District 107 ====
Incumbent Democrat Kelly Alexander has represented the 107th District since 2009.

North Carolina House of Representatives 107th district general election, 2020
Party	Candidate	Votes	%
Democratic	Kelly Alexander (incumbent)	37,421	81.33%
Republican	Richard Rivette	8,591	18.67%
Total votes		46,012	100%
Democratic hold			

==== District 108 ====
Incumbent Republican John Torbett has represented the 108th District since 2011.

North Carolina House of Representatives 108th district general election, 2020
Party	Candidate	Votes	%
Republican	John Torbett (incumbent)	24,960	63.17%
Democratic	Daniel Caudill	14,555	36.83%
Total votes		39,515	100%
Republican hold			

==== District 109 ====
Incumbent Republican Dana Bumgardner has represented the 109th District since 2013.

North Carolina House of Representatives 109th district general election, 2020
Party	Candidate	Votes	%
Republican	Dana Bumgardner (incumbent)	29,143	62.13%
Democratic	Susan Maxon	17,767	37.87%
Total votes		46,910	100%
Republican hold			

==== District 110 ====
Incumbent Republican Kelly Hastings has represented the 110th District since 2011.

North Carolina House of Representatives 110th district general election, 2020
Party	Candidate	Votes	%
Republican	Kelly Hastings (incumbent)	29,399	100.00%
Total votes		29,399	100%
Republican hold			

==== District 111 ====
Incumbent Republican Speaker of the House Tim Moore has represented the 111th District since 2003.

North Carolina House of Representatives 110th district general election, 2020
Party	Candidate	Votes	%
Republican	Tim Moore (incumbent)	24,491	63.52%
Democratic	Jennifer Childers	14,063	36.48%
Total votes		38,554	100%
Republican hold			

==== District 112 ====
Incumbent Republican David Rogers has represented the 112th District since 2016.

North Carolina House of Representatives 112th district general election, 2020
Party	Candidate	Votes	%
Republican	David Rogers (incumbent)	28,059	73.90%
Democratic	Ed Hallyburton	9,836	25.90%
Independent	Darren Joiner (Write-In)	25	0.07%
Write-in		50	0.13%
Total votes		37,970	100%
Republican hold			

==== District 113 ====
Incumbent Republican Jake Johnson has represented the 113th District since his appointment on August 6, 2019. Johnson is seeking his first full term in office.

North Carolina House of Representatives 113th district general election, 2020
Party	Candidate	Votes	%
Republican	Jake Johnson (incumbent)	30,367	59.59%
Democratic	Sam Edney	20,596	40.41%
Total votes		50,963	100%
Republican hold			

==== District 114 ====
Incumbent Democrat Susan Fisher has represented the 114th District since 2004.

North Carolina House of Representatives 114th district general election, 2020
Party	Candidate	Votes	%
Democratic	Susan Fisher (incumbent)	30,584	58.24%
Republican	Tim Hyatt	20,132	38.34%
Libertarian	Lyndon John Smith	1,794	3.42%
Total votes		62,510	100%
Democratic hold			

==== District 115 ====
Incumbent Democrat John Ager has represented the 115th District since 2015.

North Carolina House of Representatives 115th district general election, 2020
Party	Candidate	Votes	%
Democratic	John Ager (incumbent)	31,650	62.31%
Republican	Mark Crawford	19,145	37.69%
Total votes		50,795	100%
Democratic hold			

==== District 116 ====
Incumbent Democrat Brian Turner has represented the 116th District since 2015.

North Carolina House of Representatives 116th district general election, 2020
Party	Candidate	Votes	%
Democratic	Brian Turner (incumbent)	33,024	61.90%
Republican	Eric Burns	20,324	38.10%
Total votes		55,348	100%
Democratic hold			

==== District 117 ====
Incumbent Republican Chuck McGrady had represented the 117th District since 2011. McGrady resigned before the end of his term and former 116th district representative Tim Moffitt was appointed to finish his term. Moffitt was elected to a full term.

North Carolina House of Representatives 117th district general election, 2020
Party	Candidate	Votes	%
Republican	Tim Moffitt (incumbent)	29,087	60.63%
Democratic	Josh Remillard	18,887	39.37%
Total votes		47,974	100%
Republican hold			

==== District 118 ====
Incumbent Republican Michele Presnell has represented the 118th District since 2013. Presnell didn't seek re-election and fellow Republican Mark Pless won the open seat.

North Carolina House of Representatives 118th district general election, 2020
Party	Candidate	Votes	%
Republican	Mark Pless	29,321	63.60%
Democratic	Alan Jones	16,782	36.40%
Total votes		46,103	100%
Republican hold			

==== District 119 ====
Incumbent Democrat Joe Sam Queen has represented the 119th District since 2019 and previously from 2013 to 2017. Queen lost re-election to former representative Mike Clampitt.

North Carolina House of Representatives 119th district general election, 2020
Party	Candidate	Votes	%
Republican	Mike Clampitt	22,164	54.10%
Democratic	Joe Sam Queen (incumbent)	18,806	45.90%
Total votes		40,970	100%
Republican gain from Democratic			

==== District 120 ====
Incumbent Republican Kevin Corbin has represented the 120th District since 2017. Corbin sought election to the 50th district in the State Senate. Fellow Republican Karl Gillespie won the open seat.

North Carolina House of Representatives 120th district general election, 2020
Party	Candidate	Votes	%
Republican	Karl Gillespie	34,933	74.19%
Democratic	Susan Landis	12,155	25.81%
Total votes		47,088	100%
Republican hold			

== See also ==
- 2020 North Carolina elections
- List of North Carolina state legislatures
