= J. Curtis Blackwood Jr. =

American politician from North Carolina

Curtis Blackwood

Member of the North Carolina House of Representatives
- In office January 1, 2003 – January 1, 2011
- Preceded by: Fern Shubert (Redistricting)
- Succeeded by: Craig Horn
- Constituency: 73rd District (2003–2005); 68th District (2005–2011)

Personal details
- Born: October 17, 1942 (age 83) Charlotte, North Carolina
- Party: Republican
- Spouse: Audrey
- Children: 2
- Education: BA, EdD, University of Georgia; MA, Ohio University
- Occupation: Property manager

Jacob Curtis Blackwood Jr. (born October 17, 1942) was a Republican member of the North Carolina General Assembly representing the state's sixty-eighth House district, including constituents in Union county. A property manager from Matthews, North Carolina, Blackwood succeeded Fern Shubert when she left to run for North Carolina Senate. He decided not to run for another term in 2010.

== Early life and education ==
Jacob Curtis Blackwood Jr. was born October 17, 1942, in Charlotte, North Carolina. He received his BA in History from the University of Georgia in 1965. He continued his studies at Ohio University receiving a Masters in Educational Administration in 1967 before returning to the University of Georgia and graduating with an EdD in 1972.

Prior to becoming a rental property owner and manager, Blackwood was an educator and school administrator from 1965 to 1983.

== Political career ==
=== 1996 Congressional campaign ===
Blackwood ran for Congress in 1996 against long-term incumbent Bill Hefner. That year, Blackwood's main primary opponent was car dealer Sherrill Morgan who was the Republicans' 1994 nominee to face Hefner. Morgan only lost by four percentage points in 1994 and was heavily favored to win the nomination to face Hefner again. Morgan did not get enough votes to avoid a run-off election and Blackwood won the run-off with almost 64% of the vote. He went on to lose the general election to Hefner.

=== 1998 State senate campaign ===
Blackwood next sought to win a seat in the North Carolina Senate in 1998 in the 17th district. There were two seats available in the district and Blackwood along with fellow Republican Don Dawkins challenged incumbent Democrats Aaron Plyler and Bill Purcell. Both incumbents won re-election.

=== Recent electoral history ===
==== 2008 ====
North Carolina House of Representatives 68th district Republican primary election, 2008
Party	Candidate	Votes	%
Republican	Curtis Blackwood (incumbent)	6,742	65.32%
Republican	Sidney M. Sandy	3,579	34.68%
Total votes		10,321	100%

North Carolina House of Representatives 68th district general election, 2008
Party	Candidate	Votes	%
Republican	Curtis Blackwood (incumbent)	38,071	64.70%
Democratic	C. Michael "Mike" Cognac	20,767	35.30%
Total votes		58,838	100%
Republican hold			

==== 2006 ====
North Carolina House of Representatives 68th district general election, 2006
Party	Candidate	Votes	%
Republican	Curtis Blackwood (incumbent)	16,837	100%
Total votes		16,837	100%
Republican hold			

==== 2004 ====
North Carolina House of Representatives 68th district general election, 2004
Party	Candidate	Votes	%
Republican	Curtis Blackwood (incumbent)	31,252	100%
Total votes		31,252	100%
Republican hold			

==== 2002 ====
North Carolina House of Representatives 73rd district Republican primary election, 2002
Party	Candidate	Votes	%
Republican	Curtis Blackwood	2,637	41.48%
Republican	Ed Howie	2,282	35.90%
Republican	Leroy Pittman	1,438	22.62%
Total votes		6,357	100%

North Carolina House of Representatives 73rd district general election, 2002
Party	Candidate	Votes	%
Republican	Curtis Blackwood	17,477	100%
Total votes		17,477	100%
Republican hold			

North Carolina House of Representatives
Preceded by Wayne Sexton	Member of the North Carolina House of Representatives from the 73rd district 2003–2005	Succeeded by Larry Brown
Preceded by Wayne Goodwin	Member of the North Carolina House of Representatives from the 68th district 2005–2011	Succeeded by Craig Horn
