= Alice L. Bordsen =

American politician

Member of the North Carolina House of Representatives from the 63rd district
- In office January 1, 2003 – January 1, 2013
- Preceded by: Constituency established
- Succeeded by: Stephen Ross

Personal details
- Party: Democratic

Alice Louise Bordsen was a Democratic member of the North Carolina General Assembly representing the state's sixty-third House district, including constituents in Alamance county. A lawyer from Mebane, North Carolina, Bordsen served until 2012 when she declined to run for an additional term. Bordsen pursued issues of economic development and local initiatives, affordable health care, quality education and worker training, clean air and water, juvenile justice, and public safety.

Bordsen is married and has two daughters and two grandchildren.

North Carolina House of Representatives
Preceded by Jennifer Weiss	Member of the North Carolina House of Representatives from the 63rd district 2003-2013	Succeeded by Stephen Ross
