= Ben Moss =

American politician

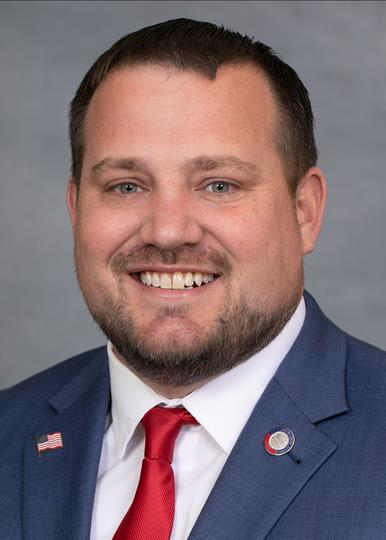

Member of the North Carolina House of Representatives
- Incumbent
- Assumed office January 1, 2021
- Preceded by: Scott Brewer
- Constituency: 66th District (2021–2023); 52nd District (2023–present)

Member of the Richmond County Board of Commissioners
- In office 2010–2020
- Succeeded by: Justin Dawkins

Personal details
- Born: Ben Thomas Moss Jr.
- Party: Republican
- Spouse: Amber
- Children: 2
- Education: Clayton State University
- Occupation: Railroad engineer
- Website: Official website

Ben Thomas Moss Jr. is a Republican member of the North Carolina House of Representatives who has represented the 52nd district (including all of Richmond County, as well as part of Moore County) and its predecessors since 2021. He defeated incumbent Democrat Scott Brewer in the 2020 election. A railroad engineer from Rockingham, North Carolina, he previously served on the Richmond County board of commissioners from 2010 to 2020.

== Committee assignments ==
=== 2021-2022 session ===
- Appropriations
- Appropriations - Transportation
- Transportation (Vice Chair)
- Local Government (Vice Chair)
- Commerce

== Electoral history ==
=== 2022 ===
North Carolina House of Representatives 52nd district Republican primary election, 2022
Party	Candidate	Votes	%
Republican	Ben Moss (incumbent)	3,688	53.34%
Republican	Jamie Boles (incumbent)	3,226	46.66%
Total votes		6,914	100%

North Carolina House of Representatives 52nd district general election, 2022
Party	Candidate	Votes	%
Republican	Ben Moss (incumbent)	19,640	100%
Total votes		19,640	100%
Republican hold			

=== 2020 ===
North Carolina House of Representatives 66th district Republican primary election, 2020
Party	Candidate	Votes	%
Republican	Ben Moss	3,604	56.72%
Republican	Joey Davis	2,750	43.28%
Total votes		6,354	100%

North Carolina House of Representatives 66th district general election, 2020
Party	Candidate	Votes	%
Republican	Ben Moss	22,093	59.90%
Democratic	Scott Brewer (incumbent)	14,731	40.10%
Total votes		36,824	100%
Republican gain from Democratic			

North Carolina House of Representatives
Preceded by Scott Brewer	Member of the North Carolina House of Representatives from the 66th district 2021–2023	Succeeded by Sarah Crawford
Preceded by Jamie Boles	Member of the North Carolina House of Representatives from the 52nd district 2023–Present	Incumbent
