= Scott Brewer =

American politician from North Carolina

Member of the North Carolina House of Representatives from the 66th district
- In office May 1, 2019 – January 1, 2021
- Preceded by: Ken Goodman
- Succeeded by: Ben Moss

Personal details
- Party: Democratic
- Occupation: attorney

Scott Brewer is a former North Carolina District Court judge who also served as a North Carolina House of Representatives member. He was appointed to the legislature on May 1, 2019, to complete the unexpired term of Ken Goodman, who accepted an appointment from Governor Roy Cooper to serve on the state Industrial Commission. Brewer represented House District 66 (Montgomery, Richmond and Stanly counties) from 2019 until 2021. In 2020 Brewer ran for re-election to a full term, but he was defeated by Republican Ben Moss.

Brewer grew up in Durham and received his Bachelor of Arts degree from the University of North Carolina at Chapel Hill and his Juris Doctor degree from Campbell University. He worked in the district attorney's office and as a district court judge for Judicial District 20A (which covers Richmond, Anson, and Stanly counties) from late 1987 until 2014. He was chief district court judge for Judicial District 20A and later 16A (Richmond, Anson, Scotland, and Hoke counties) from 2015 until his retirement in November 2018. He opened a private law office in Rockingham in March 2019.

== Electoral history ==
=== 2020 ===
North Carolina House of Representatives 66th district general election, 2020
Party	Candidate	Votes	%
Republican	Ben Moss	22,093	59.90%
Democratic	Scott Brewer (incumbent)	14,731	40.10%
Total votes		36,824	100%
Republican gain from Democratic			

North Carolina House of Representatives
Preceded by Ken Goodman	Member of the North Carolina House of Representatives from the 66th district 2019-2021	Succeeded by Ben Moss
