= Stephen M. Ross (politician) =

American politician from North Carolina

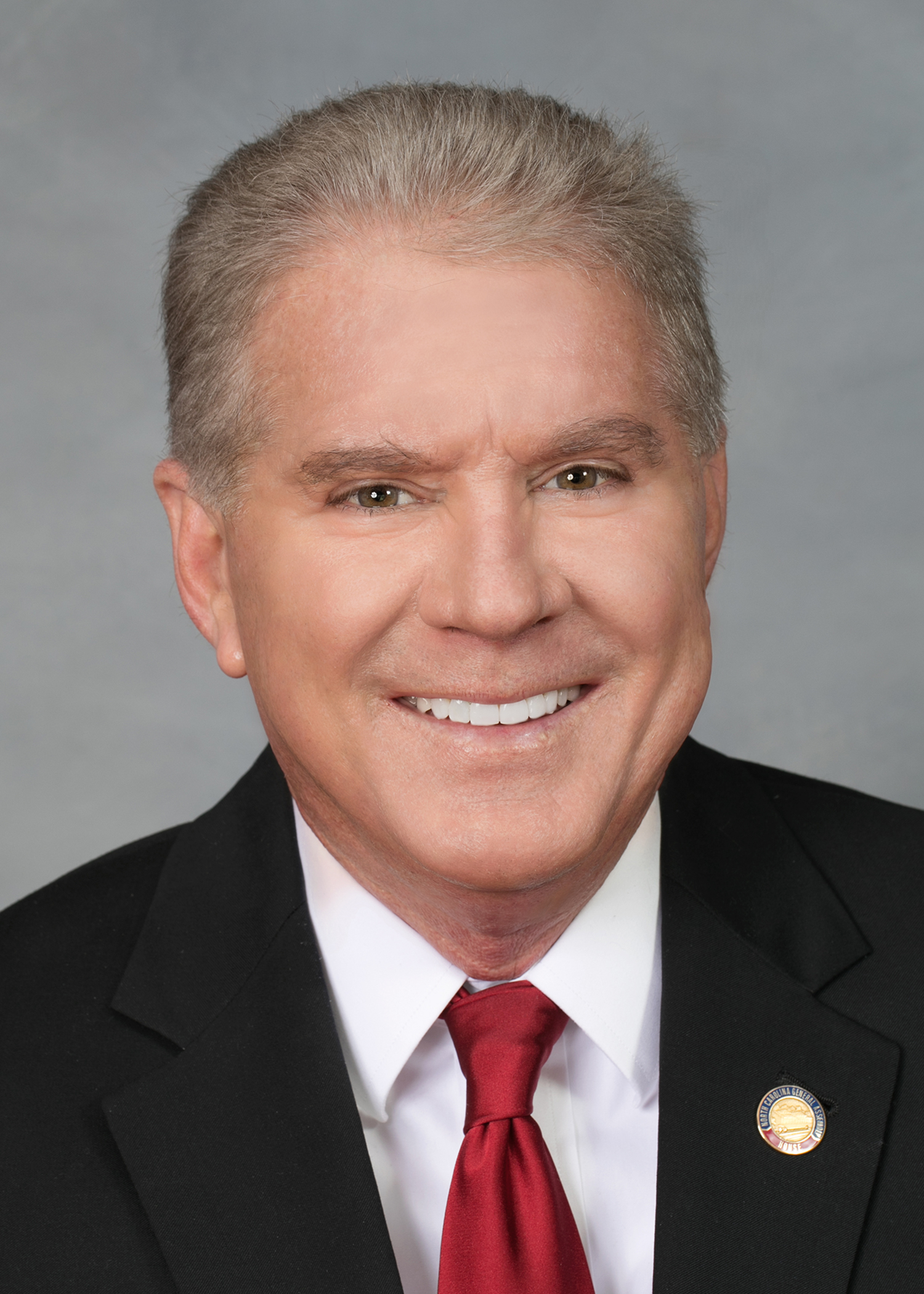

Member of the North Carolina House of Representatives from the 63rd district
- Incumbent
- Assumed office January 1, 2023
- Preceded by: Ricky Hurtado
- Succeeded by: Ian Baltutis (elect)
- In office January 1, 2013 – January 1, 2021
- Preceded by: Alice Bordsen
- Succeeded by: Ricky Hurtado

Personal details
- Born: Stephen Miles Ross; 1951 (age 74–75)
- Party: Republican
- Children: 4
- Education: Elon University (BA); North Carolina State University (MPA)
- Occupation: Financial Executive

Stephen Miles Ross (born 1951) is an American politician. He was elected to the North Carolina House of Representatives in 2012, and he served from 2013 until 2021. He was reelected in 2022 after a rematch with Ricky Hurtado, who previously had defeated Ross in 2020. A Republican, he serves the 63rd district. He has also served as mayor of Burlington, North Carolina.

== Education ==
He holds a bachelor's degree in political science and history from Elon University and a master's degree in public administration from North Carolina State University.

== Electoral history ==
=== 2022 ===
North Carolina House of Representatives 63rd district general election, 2022
Party	Candidate	Votes	%
Republican	Stephen Ross	13,955	51.08%
Democratic	Ricky Hurtado (incumbent)	13,367	48.92%
Total votes		27,322	100%
Republican gain from Democratic			

=== 2020 ===
North Carolina House of Representatives 63rd district general election, 2020
Party	Candidate	Votes	%
Democratic	Ricky Hurtado	20,584	50.59%
Republican	Stephen Ross (incumbent)	20,107	49.41%
Total votes		40,691	100%
Democratic gain from Republican			

=== 2018 ===
North Carolina House of Representatives 63rd district general election, 2018
Party	Candidate	Votes	%
Republican	Stephen Ross (incumbent)	15,311	50.49%
Democratic	Erica McAdoo	15,013	49.51%
Total votes		30,324	100%
Republican hold			

=== 2016 ===
North Carolina House of Representatives 63rd district general election, 2016
Party	Candidate	Votes	%
Republican	Stephen Ross (incumbent)	26,068	100%
Total votes		26,068	100%
Republican hold			

=== 2014 ===
North Carolina House of Representatives 63rd district general election, 2014
Party	Candidate	Votes	%
Republican	Stephen Ross (incumbent)	13,041	57.01%
Democratic	Ian Baltutis	9,834	42.99%
Total votes		22,875	100%
Republican hold			

=== 2012 ===
North Carolina House of Representatives 63rd district Republican primary election, 2012
Party	Candidate	Votes	%
Republican	Stephen Ross	3,884	65.61%
Republican	Roger Parker	2,036	34.39%
Total votes		5,920	100%

North Carolina House of Representatives 63rd district general election, 2012
Party	Candidate	Votes	%
Republican	Stephen Ross	19,435	56.65%
Democratic	Patty Philipps	14,870	43.35%
Total votes		34,305	100%
Republican gain from Democratic			

North Carolina House of Representatives
Preceded by Alice Bordsen	Member of the North Carolina House of Representatives from the 63rd district 2013–2021	Succeeded by Ricky Hurtado
Preceded by Ricky Hurtado	Member of the North Carolina House of Representatives from the 63rd district 2023–Present	Incumbent
