= James L. Boles Jr. =

American politician (born 1961)

Representative Jamie Boles
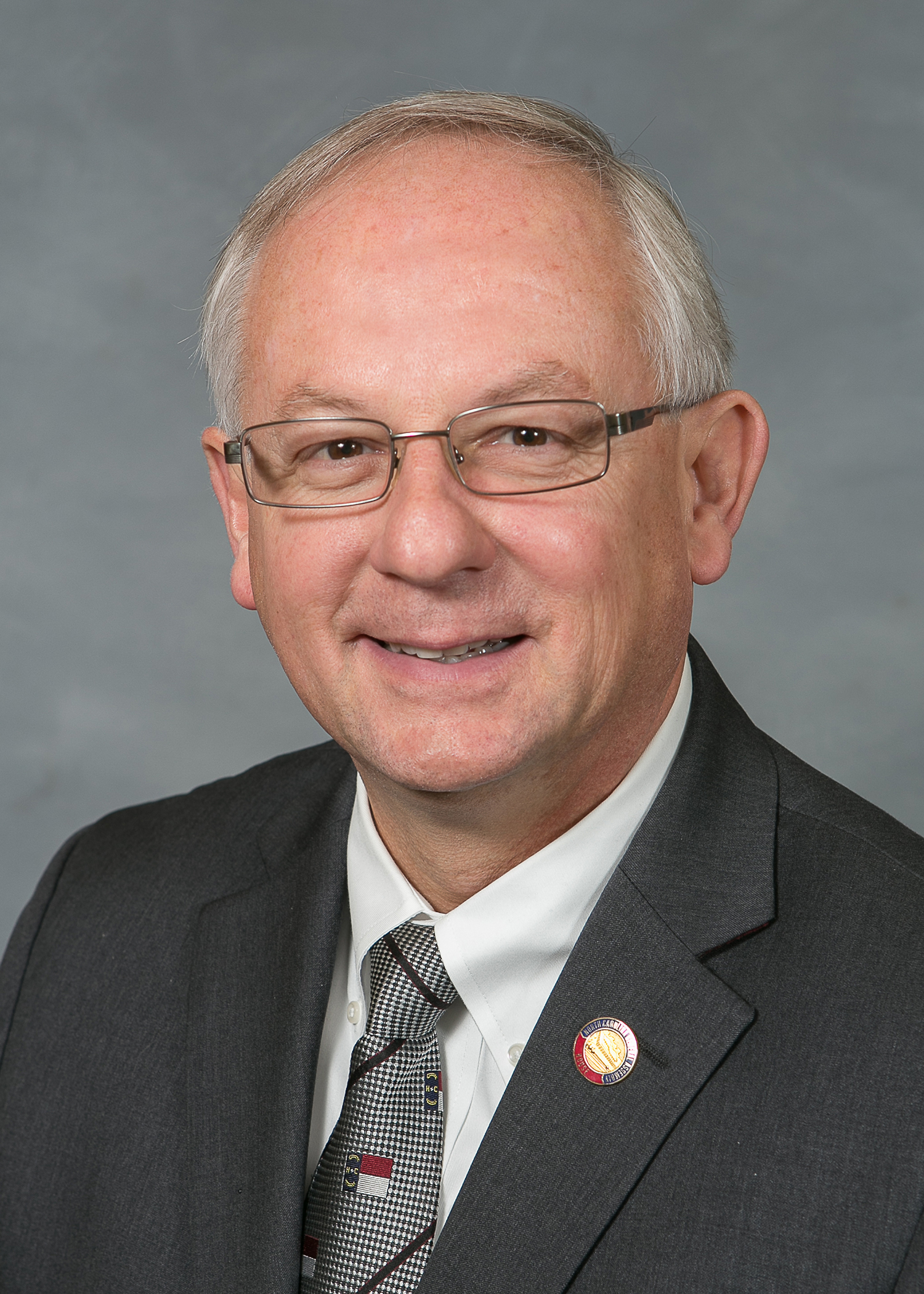

Member of the North Carolina House of Representatives from the 52nd district
- In office January 1, 2009 – January 1, 2023
- Preceded by: Joe Boylan
- Succeeded by: Ben Moss

Personal details
- Born: James Larry Boles Jr. January 16, 1961 (age 65) Aberdeen, North Carolina, U.S.
- Party: Republican
- Spouse: Angela
- Children: 7
- Education: Sandhills Community College; Cincinnati College of Mortuary Science
- Occupation: Funeral Home owner

James "Jamie" Larry Boles Jr. (born January 16, 1961) is a former Republican member of the North Carolina House of Representatives. He represented the 52nd district (which includes most of Moore County) from 2009 to 2023. A funeral home owner from Whispering Pines, North Carolina, Boles previously served as one of the Deputy Majority Whips.

== Life and career ==
Boles graduated from Sandhills Community College and graduated from Cincinnati College of Mortuary Science in 1982. He established Boles Funeral Homes and Crematory, Inc., in Moore County, North Carolina, in 1984.

== Committee assignments ==
=== 2021-2022 Session ===
- Appropriations (Vice Chair)
- Appropriations - Justice and Public Safety Committee (Senior Chair)
- Alcoholic Beverage Control (Vice Chair)
- State Government (Vice Chair)
- Homeland Security, Military, and Veterans Affairs
- Local Government
- Rules, Calendar, and Operations of the House
- Transportation

=== 2019-2020 Session ===
- Appropriations (Vice Chair)
- Appropriations - Justice and Public Safety (Senior Chair)
- Alcoholic Beverage Control (Chair)
- State and Local Government
- Homeland Security, Military, and Veterans Affairs
- Rules, Calendar, and Operations of the House
- Transportation

=== 2017-2018 Session ===
- Appropriations (Vice Chair)
- Appropriations on Justice and Public Safety (Chair)
- Alcoholic Beverage Control (Chair)
- State and Local Government II
- Rules, Calendar, and Operations of the House
- Transportation
- Commerce and Job Development
- Ethics

=== 2015-2016 Session ===
- Appropriations (Vice Chair)
- Appropriations - Information Technology
- Appropriations - Justice and Public Safety (Chair)
- Alcoholic Beverage Control (Chair)
- Local Government
- Rules, Calendar, and Operations of the House
- Transportation
- Commerce and Job Development
- Ethics
- Insurance

=== 2013-2014 Session ===
- Appropriations (Vice Chair)
- Government (Vice Chair)
- Homeland Security, Military, and Veterans Affairs
- Rules, Calendar, and Operations of the House
- Transportation
- Commerce and Job Development
- Ethics

=== 2011-2012 Session ===
- Appropriations
- Government (Vice Chair)
- Transportation
- Commerce and Job Development
- State Personnel

=== 2009-2010 Session ===
- Appropriations
- Commerce, Small Business, and Entrepreneurship
- Local Government I
- Aging
- Water Resources and Infrastructure

== Electoral history ==
=== 2022 ===
North Carolina House of Representatives 52nd district Republican primary election, 2022
Party	Candidate	Votes	%
Republican	Ben Moss (incumbent)	3,688	53.34%
Republican	Jamie Boles (incumbent)	3,226	46.66%
Total votes		6,914	100%

=== 2020 ===
North Carolina House of Representatives 52nd district Republican primary election, 2020
Party	Candidate	Votes	%
Republican	Jamie Boles (incumbent)	7,564	60.01%
Republican	Bob Temme	5,040	39.99%
Total votes		12,604	100%

North Carolina House of Representatives 52nd district general election, 2020
Party	Candidate	Votes	%
Republican	Jamie Boles (incumbent)	32,216	64.41%
Democratic	Lowell Simon	17,803	35.59%
Total votes		50,019	100%
Republican hold			

=== 2018 ===
North Carolina House of Representatives 52nd district Republican primary election, 2018
Party	Candidate	Votes	%
Republican	Jamie Boles (incumbent)	6,117	60.37%
Republican	Ken Byrd	4,015	39.63%
Total votes		10,132	100%

North Carolina House of Representatives 52nd district general election, 2018
Party	Candidate	Votes	%
Republican	Jamie Boles (incumbent)	22,438	62.71%
Democratic	Lowell Simon	13,342	37.29%
Total votes		35,780	100%
Republican hold			

=== 2016 ===
North Carolina House of Representatives 52nd district Republican primary election, 2016
Party	Candidate	Votes	%
Republican	Jamie Boles (incumbent)	8,288	53.75%
Republican	John (JD) Zumwalt	7,132	46.25%
Total votes		15,420	100%

North Carolina House of Representatives 52nd district general election, 2016
Party	Candidate	Votes	%
Republican	Jamie Boles (incumbent)	31,146	100%
Total votes		31,146	100%
Republican hold			

=== 2014 ===
North Carolina House of Representatives 52nd district general election, 2014
Party	Candidate	Votes	%
Republican	Jamie Boles (incumbent)	21,751	100%
Total votes		21,751	100%
Republican hold			

=== 2012 ===
North Carolina House of Representatives 52nd district general election, 2012
Party	Candidate	Votes	%
Republican	Jamie Boles (incumbent)	27,521	100%
Total votes		27,521	100%
Republican hold			

=== 2010 ===
North Carolina House of Representatives 52nd district general election, 2010
Party	Candidate	Votes	%
Republican	Jamie Boles (incumbent)	20,749	100%
Total votes		20,749	100%
Republican hold			

=== 2008 ===
North Carolina House of Representatives 52nd district Republican primary election, 2008
Party	Candidate	Votes	%
Republican	Jamie Boles	4,880	46.55%
Republican	Lane Toomey	2,970	28.33%
Republican	Joe Boylan (incumbent)	2,634	25.12%
Total votes		10,484	100%

North Carolina House of Representatives 52nd district general election, 2008
Party	Candidate	Votes	%
Republican	Jamie Boles	27,727	65.89%
Democratic	Betty Mangum	14,355	34.11%
Total votes		42,082	100%
Republican hold			

North Carolina House of Representatives
Preceded by Joe Boylan	Member of the North Carolina House of Representatives from the 52nd district 2009–2023	Succeeded by Ben Moss
