= North Carolina's 52nd House district =

American legislative district

North Carolina's 52nd State House of Representatives district
Representative
Ben Moss; R–Rockingham
- Demographics: 64% White; 22% Black; 7% Hispanic; 1% Asian; 1% Native American; 1% Other; 4% Multiracial
- Population (2024): 86,673

North Carolina's 52nd House district is one of 120 districts in the North Carolina House of Representatives. It has been represented by Republican Ben Moss since 2023.

== Geography ==
Since 2023, the district has included all of Richmond County, as well as part of Moore County. The district overlaps with the 21st and 29th Senate districts.

== District officeholders ==
=== Multi-member district ===
Representative	Party	Dates	Notes	Representative	Party	Dates	Notes	Counties
District created January 1, 1983.
Charles Millwee Beall (Clyde)	Democratic	January 1, 1983 – January 1, 1999		Liston Ramsey (Marshall)	Democratic	January 1, 1983 – January 1, 2001	Redistricted from the 44th district. Retired.	1983–1993; All of Madison, Haywood, Jackson, and Swain counties. Parts of Graham County.
Charles Millwee Beall (Clyde)	Democratic	January 1, 1983 – January 1, 1999		Liston Ramsey (Marshall)	Democratic	January 1, 1983 – January 1, 2001	Redistricted from the 44th district. Retired.	1993–2003; All of Madison, Haywood, Swain, and Graham counties. Part of Jackson County.
Phil Haire (Sylva)	Democratic	January 1, 1999 – January 1, 2003	Redistricted to the 119th district.	Liston Ramsey (Marshall)	Democratic	January 1, 1983 – January 1, 2001	Redistricted from the 44th district. Retired.	1993–2003; All of Madison, Haywood, Swain, and Graham counties. Part of Jackson County.
Phil Haire (Sylva)	Democratic	January 1, 1999 – January 1, 2003	Redistricted to the 119th district.	Margaret Carpenter (Waynesville)	Republican	January 1, 2001 – January 1, 2003	Redistricted to the 118th district and lost re-election.	1993–2003; All of Madison, Haywood, Swain, and Graham counties. Part of Jackson County.

=== Single-member district ===
Representative	Party	Dates	Notes	Counties
Richard Morgan (Eagle Springs)	Republican	January 1, 2003 – January 1, 2007	Redistricted from the 31st district Lost re-nomination.	2003–2023; Part of Moore County.
Joe Boylan (Pinehurst)	Republican	January 1, 2007 – January 1, 2009	Lost re-nomination.	2003–2023; Part of Moore County.
Jamie Boles (Whispering Pines)	Republican	January 1, 2009 – January 1, 2023	Lost re-nomination.	2003–2023; Part of Moore County.
Ben Moss (Rockingham)	Republican	January 1, 2023 – Present	Redistricted from the 66th district.	2023–Present; All of Richmond County. Part of Moore County.

== Election results ==
=== 2024 ===
North Carolina House of Representatives 52nd district general election, 2024
Party	Candidate	Votes	%
Republican	Ben Moss (incumbent)	25,835	61.07%
Democratic	Jimmy Self	16,466	38.93%
Total votes		42,301	100%
Republican hold			

=== 2022 ===
North Carolina House of Representatives 52nd district Republican primary election, 2022
Party	Candidate	Votes	%
Republican	Ben Moss (incumbent)	3,688	53.34%
Republican	Jamie Boles (incumbent)	3,226	46.66%
Total votes		6,914	100%

North Carolina House of Representatives 52nd district general election, 2022
Party	Candidate	Votes	%
Republican	Ben Moss (incumbent)	19,640	100%
Total votes		19,640	100%
Republican hold			

=== 2020 ===
North Carolina House of Representatives 52nd district Republican primary election, 2020
Party	Candidate	Votes	%
Republican	Jamie Boles (incumbent)	7,564	60.01%
Republican	Bob Temme	5,040	39.99%
Total votes		12,604	100%

North Carolina House of Representatives 52nd district general election, 2020
Party	Candidate	Votes	%
Republican	Jamie Boles (incumbent)	32,216	64.41%
Democratic	Lowell Simon	17,803	35.59%
Total votes		50,019	100%
Republican hold			

=== 2018 ===
North Carolina House of Representatives 52nd district Republican primary election, 2018
Party	Candidate	Votes	%
Republican	Jamie Boles (incumbent)	6,117	60.37%
Republican	Ken Byrd	4,015	39.63%
Total votes		10,132	100%

North Carolina House of Representatives 52nd district general election, 2018
Party	Candidate	Votes	%
Republican	Jamie Boles (incumbent)	22,438	62.71%
Democratic	Lowell Simon	13,342	37.29%
Total votes		35,780	100%
Republican hold			

=== 2016 ===
North Carolina House of Representatives 52nd district Republican primary election, 2016
Party	Candidate	Votes	%
Republican	Jamie Boles (incumbent)	8,288	53.75%
Republican	John "JD" Zumwalt	7,132	46.25%
Total votes		15,420	100%

North Carolina House of Representatives 52nd district general election, 2016
Party	Candidate	Votes	%
Republican	Jamie Boles (incumbent)	31,146	100%
Total votes		31,146	100%
Republican hold			

=== 2014 ===
North Carolina House of Representatives 52nd district general election, 2014
Party	Candidate	Votes	%
Republican	Jamie Boles (incumbent)	21,751	100%
Total votes		21,751	100%
Republican hold			

=== 2012 ===
North Carolina House of Representatives 52nd district general election, 2012
Party	Candidate	Votes	%
Republican	Jamie Boles (incumbent)	27,521	100%
Total votes		27,521	100%
Republican hold			

=== 2010 ===
North Carolina House of Representatives 52nd district general election, 2010
Party	Candidate	Votes	%
Republican	Jamie Boles (incumbent)	20,749	100%
Total votes		20,749	100%
Republican hold			

=== 2008 ===
North Carolina House of Representatives 52nd district Republican primary election, 2008
Party	Candidate	Votes	%
Republican	Jamie Boles	4,880	46.55%
Republican	Lane Toomey	2,970	28.33%
Republican	Joe Boylan (incumbent)	2,634	25.12%
Total votes		10,484	100%

North Carolina House of Representatives 52nd district general election, 2008
Party	Candidate	Votes	%
Republican	Jamie Boles	27,727	65.89%
Democratic	Betty Mangum	14,355	34.11%
Total votes		42,082	100%
Republican hold			

=== 2006 ===
North Carolina House of Representatives 52nd district Republican primary election, 2006
Party	Candidate	Votes	%
Republican	Joe Boylan	4,457	51.69%
Republican	Richard Morgan (incumbent)	4,166	48.31%
Total votes		8,623	100%

North Carolina House of Representatives 52nd district general election, 2006
Party	Candidate	Votes	%
Republican	Joe Boylan	8,250	43.41%
Independent	Gerald L. Galloway	6,799	35.77%
Independent	Manila G. "Bud" Shaver	3,958	20.82%
Total votes		19,007	100%
Republican hold			

=== 2004 ===
North Carolina House of Representatives 52nd district Republican primary election, 2004
Party	Candidate	Votes	%
Republican	Richard Morgan (incumbent)	4,376	51.49%
Republican	Peggy Crutchfield	4,122	48.51%
Total votes		8,498	100%

North Carolina House of Representatives 52nd district general election, 2004
Party	Candidate	Votes	%
Republican	Richard Morgan (incumbent)	23,868	100%
Total votes		23,868	100%
Republican hold			

=== 2002 ===
North Carolina House of Representatives 52nd district general election, 2002
Party	Candidate	Votes	%
Republican	Richard Morgan (incumbent)	14,477	85.57%
Libertarian	Todd Unkefer	2,442	14.43%
Total votes		16,919	100%
Republican hold			

=== 2000 ===
North Carolina House of Representatives 52nd district Democratic primary election, 2000
Party	Candidate	Votes	%
Democratic	Phil Haire (incumbent)	6,780	39.28%
Democratic	Mary Ann Enloe	3,925	22.74%
Democratic	W. Eric "Rick" Lee	3,296	19.10%
Democratic	Charles M. Starnes	3,260	18.89%
Total votes		17,261	100%

North Carolina House of Representatives 52nd district general election, 2000
Party	Candidate	Votes	%
Democratic	Phil Haire (incumbent)	24,983	27.50%
Republican	Margaret Carpenter	23,485	25.85%
Democratic	Mary Ann Enloe	23,381	25.74%
Republican	Jesse Sigmon	18,998	20.91%
Total votes		90,847	100%
Democratic hold			
Republican gain from Democratic			
