= North Carolina's 68th House district =

American legislative district

North Carolina's 68th State House of Representatives district
Representative
David Willis; R–Marvin
- Demographics: 70% White; 9% Black; 9% Hispanic; 8% Asian; 4% Multiracial
- Population (2024): 93,109

North Carolina's 68th House district is one of 120 districts in the North Carolina House of Representatives. It has been represented by Republican David Willis since 2021.

== Geography ==
Since 2005, the district has included part of Union County. The district overlaps with the 35th Senate district.

== District officeholders ==
Representative	Party	Dates	Notes	Counties
District created January 1, 1985.
W. Paul Pulley Jr. (Durham)	Democratic	January 1, 1985 – January 1, 1987	1985–1989; Part of Durham County.	Redistricted from the 23rd district.
Sharon Thompson (Durham)	Democratic	January 1, 1987 – January 1, 1989	1985–1989; Part of Durham County.	Redistricted to the 23rd district.
District abolished January 1, 1989.
District re-established January 1, 1993.
Bill Ives (Brevard)	Republican	January 1, 1993 – January 1, 1999		1993–2003; All of Transylvania County. Parts of Henderson and Buncombe counties.
Trudi Walend (Brevard)	Republican	January 1, 1999 – January 1, 2003	Redistricted to the 113th district.	1993–2003; All of Transylvania County. Parts of Henderson and Buncombe counties.
Wayne Goodwin (Rockingham)	Democratic	January 1, 2003 – January 1, 2005	Redistricted from the 32nd district. Redistricted to the 66th district and retired to run for Labor Commissioner.	2003–2005; All of Richmond County; Part of Stanly County.
Curtis Blackwood (Matthews)	Republican	January 1, 2005 – January 1, 2011	Redistricted from the 73rd district. Retired.	2005–Present; Part of Union County.
Craig Horn (Weddington)	Republican	January 1, 2011 – January 1, 2021	Retired to run for Superintendent of Public Instruction.	2005–Present; Part of Union County.
David Willis (Marvin)	Republican	January 1, 2021 – Present		2005–Present; Part of Union County.

== Election results ==
=== 2024 ===
North Carolina House of Representatives 68th district general election, 2024
Party	Candidate	Votes	%
Republican	David Willis (incumbent)	33,807	62.49%
Democratic	Cristal Robinson	20,290	37.51%
Total votes		54,097	100%
Republican hold			

=== 2022 ===
North Carolina House of Representatives 68th district general election, 2022
Party	Candidate	Votes	%
Republican	David Willis (incumbent)	24,883	100%
Total votes		24,883	100%
Republican hold			

=== 2020 ===
North Carolina House of Representatives 68th district general election, 2020
Party	Candidate	Votes	%
Republican	David Willis	36,413	62.99%
Democratic	Ericka L. McKnight	21,394	37.01%
Total votes		57,807	100%
Republican hold			

=== 2018 ===
North Carolina House of Representatives 68th district general election, 2018
Party	Candidate	Votes	%
Republican	Craig Horn (incumbent)	21,138	58.48%
Democratic	Rick Foulke	15,009	41.52%
Total votes		36,147	100%
Republican hold			

=== 2016 ===
North Carolina House of Representatives 68th district general election, 2016
Party	Candidate	Votes	%
Republican	Craig Horn (incumbent)	30,953	100%
Total votes		30,953	100%
Republican hold			

=== 2014 ===
North Carolina House of Representatives 68th district general election, 2014
Party	Candidate	Votes	%
Republican	Craig Horn (incumbent)	16,430	100%
Total votes		16,430	100%
Republican hold			

=== 2012 ===
North Carolina House of Representatives 68th district general election, 2012
Party	Candidate	Votes	%
Republican	Craig Horn (incumbent)	22,811	65.15%
Democratic	Kenneth J. Baker	12,200	34.85%
Total votes		35,011	100%
Republican hold			

=== 2010 ===
North Carolina House of Representatives 68th district Republican primary election, 2010
Party	Candidate	Votes	%
Republican	Craig Horn	4,675	62.37%
Republican	Jeff Gerber	2,821	37.63%
Total votes		7,496	100%

North Carolina House of Representatives 68th district general election, 2010
Party	Candidate	Votes	%
Republican	Craig Horn	28,214	100%
Total votes		28,214	100%
Republican hold			

=== 2008 ===
North Carolina House of Representatives 68th district Republican primary election, 2008
Party	Candidate	Votes	%
Republican	Curtis Blackwood (incumbent)	6,742	65.32%
Republican	Sidney M. Sandy	3,579	34.68%
Total votes		10,321	100%

North Carolina House of Representatives 68th district general election, 2008
Party	Candidate	Votes	%
Republican	Curtis Blackwood (incumbent)	38,071	64.70%
Democratic	C. Michael "Mike" Cognac	20,767	35.30%
Total votes		58,838	100%
Republican hold			

=== 2006 ===
North Carolina House of Representatives 68th district general election, 2006
Party	Candidate	Votes	%
Republican	Curtis Blackwood (incumbent)	16,837	100%
Total votes		16,837	100%
Republican hold			

=== 2004 ===
North Carolina House of Representatives 68th district general election, 2004
Party	Candidate	Votes	%
Republican	Curtis Blackwood (incumbent)	31,252	100%
Total votes		31,252	100%
Republican hold			

=== 2002 ===
North Carolina House of Representatives 68th district Republican primary election, 2002
Party	Candidate	Votes	%
Republican	George E. Crump III	960	36.77%
Republican	Joseph E. Carter	935	35.81%
Republican	Kenny Furr	716	27.42%
Total votes		2,611	100%

North Carolina House of Representatives 68th district general election, 2002
Party	Candidate	Votes	%
Democratic	Wayne Goodwin (incumbent)	10,393	55.86%
Republican	George E. Crump III	7,833	42.10%
Libertarian	David Muse	381	2.05%
Total votes		18,607	100%
Democratic hold			

=== 2000 ===
North Carolina House of Representatives 68th district Republican primary election, 2000
Party	Candidate	Votes	%
Republican	Trudi Walend (incumbent)	3,809	78.59%
Republican	Horace Jarrett	1,038	21.42%
Total votes		4,847	100%

North Carolina House of Representatives 68th district general election, 2000
Party	Candidate	Votes	%
Republican	Trudi Walend (incumbent)	21,456	100%
Total votes		21,456	100%
Republican hold			
