= David Willis (politician) =

American politician

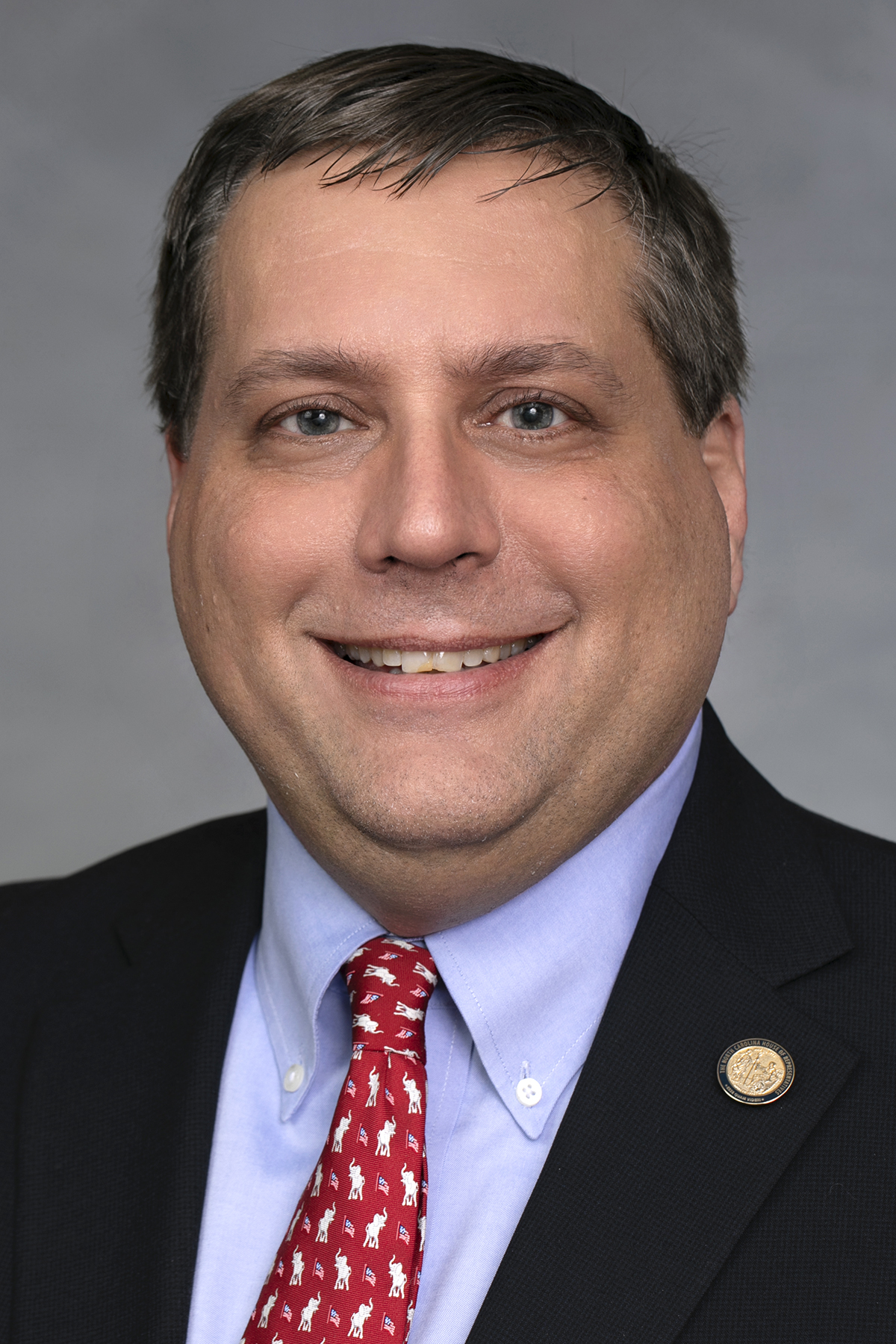

Member of the North Carolina House of Representatives from the 68th district
- Incumbent
- Assumed office January 1, 2021
- Preceded by: Craig Horn

Personal details
- Born: David Allen Willis
- Party: Republican
- Spouse: Shannon
- Children: 3
- Education: Appalachian State University
- Website: Official website

David Willis is a Republican member of the North Carolina House of Representatives who has represented the 68th district (including part of Union County) since 2021.

== Committee assignments ==
=== 2021-2022 session ===
- Appropriations
- Appropriations - Education
- K-12 Education (Vice Chair)
- Election Law and Campaign Finance Reform Committee
- Transportation

== Electoral history ==
North Carolina House of Representatives 68th district general election, 2020
Party	Candidate	Votes	%
Republican	David Willis	36,413	62.99%
Democratic	Ericka L. McKnight	21,394	37.01%
Total votes		57,807	100%
Republican hold			

North Carolina House of Representatives
Preceded by Craig Horn	Member of the North Carolina House of Representatives from the 68th district 2021–present	Incumbent
