= D. Craig Horn =

American politician

Craig Horn
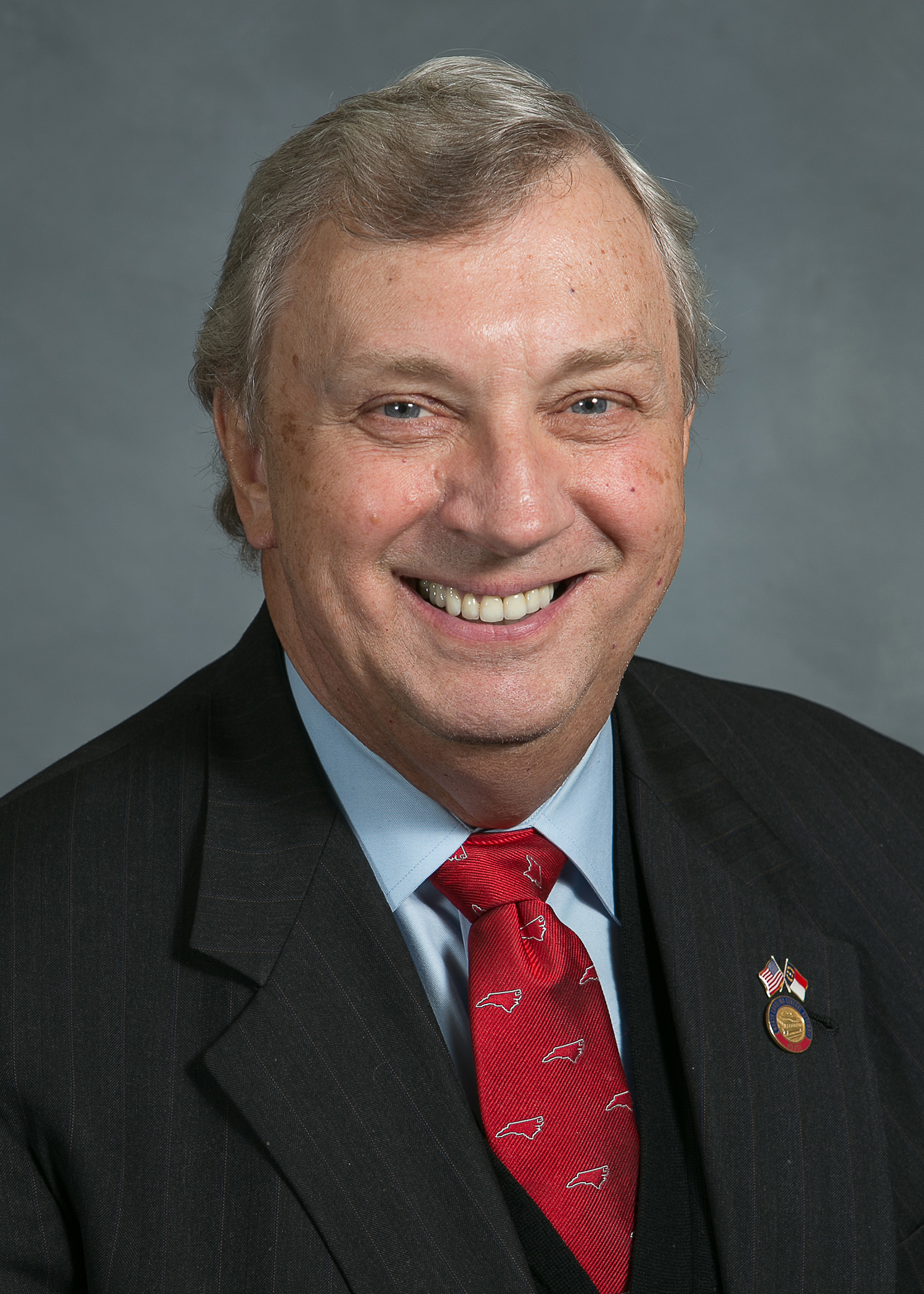

Mayor of Weddington
- In office December 13, 2021 – December 11, 2023
- Preceded by: Elizabeth Callis
- Succeeded by: Jim Bell

Member of the North Carolina House of Representatives from the 68th district
- In office January 1, 2011 – January 1, 2021
- Preceded by: Curtis Blackwood
- Succeeded by: David Willis

Personal details
- Born: Dwight Craig Horn; May 9, 1944 (age 82) Davenport, Iowa
- Party: Republican

Dwight Craig Horn (born May 9, 1944) is a former Republican member of the North Carolina House of Representatives. He represented the 68th district (containing parts of Union County) from 2011 until 2021. Afterwards, he served a term as mayor of Weddington.

== Electoral history ==
=== 2021 ===
Weddington mayoral election, 2021
Candidate	Votes	%
Craig Horn	966	64.88%
Bill Deter	325	21.83%
Tracy Stone	197	13.23%
Write-in	1	0.07%
Total votes	1,489	100%

=== 2020 ===
North Carolina Superintendent of Public Instruction Republican primary election, 2020
Party	Candidate	Votes	%
Republican	Catherine Truitt	391,915	56.68%
Republican	Craig Horn	299,578	43.32%
Total votes		691,493	100%

=== 2018 ===
North Carolina House of Representatives 68th district general election, 2018
Party	Candidate	Votes	%
Republican	Craig Horn (incumbent)	21,138	58.48%
Democratic	Rick Foulke	15,009	41.52%
Total votes		36,147	100%
Republican hold			

=== 2016 ===
North Carolina House of Representatives 68th district general election, 2016
Party	Candidate	Votes	%
Republican	Craig Horn (incumbent)	30,953	100%
Total votes		30,953	100%
Republican hold			

=== 2014 ===
North Carolina House of Representatives 68th district general election, 2014
Party	Candidate	Votes	%
Republican	Craig Horn (incumbent)	16,430	100%
Total votes		16,430	100%
Republican hold			

=== 2012 ===
North Carolina House of Representatives 68th district general election, 2012
Party	Candidate	Votes	%
Republican	Craig Horn (incumbent)	22,811	65.15%
Democratic	Kenneth J. Baker	12,200	34.85%
Total votes		35,011	100%
Republican hold			

=== 2010 ===
North Carolina House of Representatives 68th district Republican primary election, 2010
Party	Candidate	Votes	%
Republican	Craig Horn	4,675	62.37%
Republican	Jeff Gerber	2,821	37.63%
Total votes		7,496	100%

North Carolina House of Representatives 68th district general election, 2010
Party	Candidate	Votes	%
Republican	Craig Horn	28,214	100%
Total votes		28,214	100%
Republican hold			

North Carolina House of Representatives
Preceded by Curtis Blackwood	Member of the North Carolina House of Representatives from the 68th district 2011–2021	Succeeded by David Willis
