= Becky Carney =

American politician

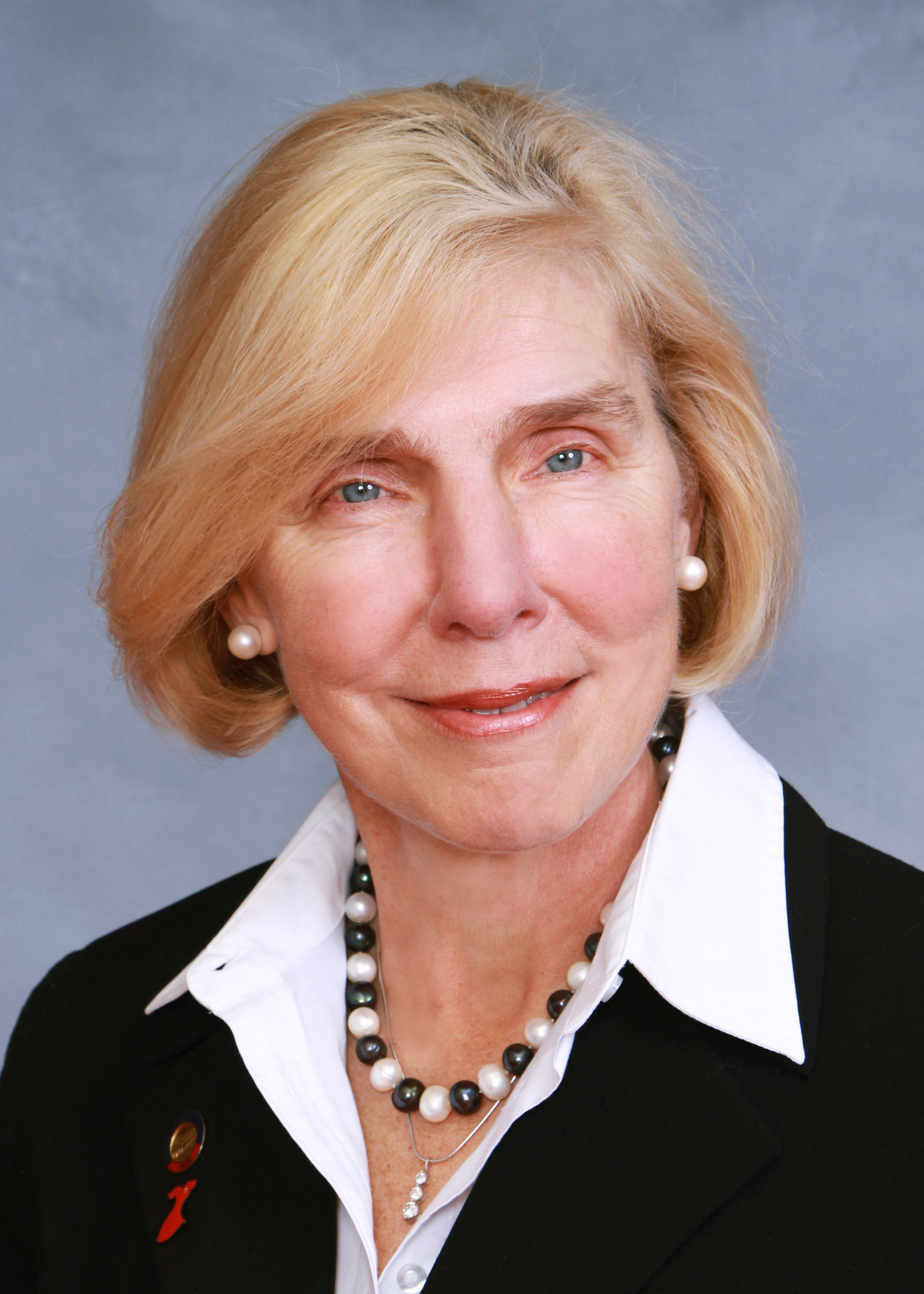

Member of the North Carolina House of Representatives from the 102nd district
- Incumbent
- Assumed office January 1, 2003
- Preceded by: Ruth Easterling (Redistricting)

Personal details
- Born: December 25, 1944 (age 81)
- Party: Democratic

Rebecca Ann Carney (born December 25, 1944) is a Democratic member of the North Carolina House of Representatives representing the 102nd district since 2003. Her district includes constituents in Mecklenburg county. Carney is a homemaker from Charlotte, North Carolina.

In 2002, Carney defeated Libertarian Daniel Elmaleh in the general election. She was first elected to the Mecklenburg Board of County Commissioners in 1996, where she served three terms, and held the position of vice chairman several times. Carney had an unsuccessful run for school board in 1995.

During a late night House session on July 2, 2012, Carney accidentally cast the decisive vote to override Governor Bev Perdue's veto of Senate Bill 820, which legalized hydraulic fracturing in North Carolina. A longstanding House rule that disallows changing of a vote if the vote changes the outcome of the bill prevented Carney from correcting her electronic vote to reflect her intended position.

== Electoral history ==
=== 2022 ===
North Carolina House of Representatives 102nd district general election, 2022
Party	Candidate	Votes	%
Democratic	Becky Carney (incumbent)		
Republican	Cynthia Eleanor Clementi		
Total votes			100%

=== 2020 ===
North Carolina House of Representatives 102nd district Democratic primary election, 2020
Party	Candidate	Votes	%
Democratic	Becky Carney (incumbent)	9,277	64.19%
Democratic	Jonathan Peebles	3,675	25.43%
Democratic	Leroy Dean	790	5.47%
Democratic	Anthony E. Forman	710	4.91%
Total votes		14,452	100%

North Carolina House of Representatives 102nd district general election, 2020
Party	Candidate	Votes	%
Democratic	Becky Carney (incumbent)	34,931	78.44%
Republican	Kyle Kirby	9,599	21.56%
Total votes		44,530	100%
Democratic hold			

=== 2018 ===
North Carolina House of Representatives 102nd district Democratic primary election, 2018
Party	Candidate	Votes	%
Democratic	Becky Carney (incumbent)	4,366	81.24%
Democratic	Josh Jarrett	1,008	18.76%
Total votes		5,374	100%

North Carolina House of Representatives 102nd district general election, 2018
Party	Candidate	Votes	%
Democratic	Becky Carney (incumbent)	21,609	83.35%
Republican	Tyler Norris	4,316	16.65%
Total votes		25,925	100%
Democratic hold			

=== 2016 ===
North Carolina House of Representatives 102nd district general election, 2016
Party	Candidate	Votes	%
Democratic	Becky Carney (incumbent)	27,836	100%
Total votes		27,836	100%
Democratic hold			

=== 2014 ===
North Carolina House of Representatives 102nd district general election, 2014
Party	Candidate	Votes	%
Democratic	Becky Carney (incumbent)	12,938	100%
Total votes		12,938	100%
Democratic hold			

=== 2012 ===
North Carolina House of Representatives 102nd district general election, 2012
Party	Candidate	Votes	%
Democratic	Becky Carney (incumbent)	26,802	100%
Total votes		26,802	100%
Democratic hold			

=== 2010 ===
North Carolina House of Representatives 102nd district Democratic primary election, 2010
Party	Candidate	Votes	%
Democratic	Becky Carney (incumbent)	1,510	61.76%
Democratic	Kim Ratliff	714	29.20%
Democratic	Ken Davies	221	9.04%
Total votes		2,445	100%

North Carolina House of Representatives 102nd district general election, 2010
Party	Candidate	Votes	%
Democratic	Becky Carney (incumbent)	10,993	100%
Total votes		10,993	100%
Democratic hold			

=== 2008 ===
North Carolina House of Representatives 102nd district general election, 2008
Party	Candidate	Votes	%
Democratic	Becky Carney (incumbent)	21,705	80.72%
Republican	Gregory Patrick Hill	5,183	19.28%
Total votes		26,888	100%
Democratic hold			

=== 2006 ===
North Carolina House of Representatives 102nd district general election, 2006
Party	Candidate	Votes	%
Democratic	Becky Carney (incumbent)	7,994	100%
Total votes		7,994	100%
Democratic hold			

=== 2004 ===
North Carolina House of Representatives 102nd district general election, 2004
Party	Candidate	Votes	%
Democratic	Becky Carney (incumbent)	17,277	100%
Total votes		17,277	100%
Democratic hold			

=== 2002 ===
North Carolina House of Representatives 102nd district Democratic primary election, 2002
Party	Candidate	Votes	%
Democratic	Becky Carney	2,075	52.07%
Democratic	Patsy Kinsey	1,910	47.93%
Total votes		3,985	100%

North Carolina House of Representatives 102nd district general election, 2002
Party	Candidate	Votes	%
Democratic	Becky Carney	10,923	91.00%
Libertarian	Daniel Elmaleh	1,080	9.00%
Total votes		12,003	100%
Democratic hold			

North Carolina House of Representatives
Preceded by Constituency established	Member of the North Carolina House of Representatives from the 102nd district 2003-present	Incumbent
