= North Carolina's 63rd House district =

American legislative district

North Carolina's 63rd State House of Representatives district
Representative
Stephen Ross; R–Burlington
- Demographics: 60% White; 20% Black; 14% Hispanic; 2% Asian; 4% Multiracial
- Population (2024): 86,451

North Carolina's 63rd House district is one of 120 districts in the North Carolina House of Representatives. It has been represented by Republican Stephen Ross since 2023. Ross previously represented the district from 2013 to 2021.

== Geography ==
Since 2003, the district has included part of Alamance County. The district overlaps with the 25th Senate district.

== District officeholders ==
Representative	Party	Dates	Notes	Counties
District created January 1, 1985.
Margaret Ann Stamey (Raleigh)	Democratic	January 1, 1985 – January 1, 1993	Redistricted from the 21st district.	1985–2003; Part of Wake County.
Jane Hurley Mosely (Cary)	Democratic	January 1, 1993 – January 1, 1995	Lost re-election.	1985–2003; Part of Wake County.
Arlene Pulley (Raleigh)	Republican	January 1, 1995 – January 1, 1997	Lost re-election.	1985–2003; Part of Wake County.
Jane Hurley Mosely (Cary)	Democratic	January 1, 1997 – September 28, 1999	Died.	1985–2003; Part of Wake County.
Vacant		September 28, 1999 – November 29, 1999		1985–2003; Part of Wake County.
Jennifer Weiss (Cary)	Democratic	November 29, 1999 – January 1, 2003	Appointed to finish Mosely's term. Redistricted to the 35th district.	1985–2003; Part of Wake County.
Alice Bordsen (Mebane)	Democratic	January 1, 2003 – January 1, 2013	Retired.	2003–Present; Parts of Alamance County.
Stephen Ross (Burlington)	Republican	January 1, 2013 – January 1, 2021	Lost re-election.	2003–Present; Parts of Alamance County.
Ricky Hurtado (Burlington)	Democratic	January 1, 2021 – January 1, 2023	Lost re-election.	2003–Present; Parts of Alamance County.
Stephen Ross (Burlington)	Republican	January 1, 2023 – Present	Retiring.	2003–Present; Parts of Alamance County.

== Election results ==
=== 2024 ===
North Carolina House of Representatives 63rd District general election, 2024
Party	Candidate	Votes	%
Republican	Stephen Ross (incumbent)	23,812	55.03%
Democratic	Robin Wintringham	19,460	44.97%
Total votes		43,272	100%
Republican hold			

=== 2022 ===
North Carolina House of Representatives 63rd district Republican primary election, 2022
Party	Candidate	Votes	%
Republican	Stephen Ross	2,182	49.83%
Republican	Ed Priola	2,027	46.29%
Republican	Peter Boykin	170	3.88%
Total votes		4,379	100%

North Carolina House of Representatives 63rd District General Election, 2022
Party	Candidate	Votes	%
Republican	Stephen Ross	13,955	51.08%
Democratic	Ricky Hurtado (incumbent)	13,367	48.92%
Total votes		27,322	100%
Republican gain from Democratic			

=== 2020 ===
North Carolina House of Representatives 63rd district general election, 2020
Party	Candidate	Votes	%
Democratic	Ricky Hurtado	20,584	50.59%
Republican	Stephen Ross (incumbent)	20,107	49.41%
Total votes		40,691	100%
Democratic gain from Republican			

=== 2018 ===
North Carolina House of Representatives 63rd district general election, 2018
Party	Candidate	Votes	%
Republican	Stephen Ross (incumbent)	15,311	50.49%
Democratic	Erica McAdoo	15,013	49.51%
Total votes		30,324	100%
Republican hold			

=== 2016 ===
North Carolina House of Representatives 63rd district general election, 2016
Party	Candidate	Votes	%
Republican	Stephen Ross (incumbent)	26,068	100%
Total votes		26,068	100%
Republican hold			

=== 2014 ===
North Carolina House of Representatives 63rd district general election, 2014
Party	Candidate	Votes	%
Republican	Stephen Ross (incumbent)	13,041	57.01%
Democratic	Ian Baltutis	9,834	42.99%
Total votes		22,875	100%
Republican hold			

=== 2012 ===
North Carolina House of Representatives 63rd district Republican primary election, 2012
Party	Candidate	Votes	%
Republican	Stephen Ross	3,884	65.61%
Republican	Roger Parker	2,036	34.39%
Total votes		5,920	100%

North Carolina House of Representatives 63rd district general election, 2012
Party	Candidate	Votes	%
Republican	Stephen Ross	19,435	56.65%
Democratic	Patty Philipps	14,870	43.35%
Total votes		34,305	100%
Republican gain from Democratic			

=== 2010 ===
North Carolina House of Representatives 63rd district general election, 2010
Party	Candidate	Votes	%
Democratic	Alice Bordsen (incumbent)	8,920	54.21%
Republican	Roger Kirk Parker	7,536	45.79%
Total votes		16,456	100%
Democratic hold			

=== 2008 ===
North Carolina House of Representatives 63rd district general election, 2008
Party	Candidate	Votes	%
Democratic	Alice Bordsen (incumbent)	16,658	62.70%
Republican	Celo Faucette	9,909	37.30%
Total votes		26,567	100%
Democratic hold			

=== 2006 ===
North Carolina House of Representatives 63rd district general election, 2006
Party	Candidate	Votes	%
Democratic	Alice Bordsen (incumbent)	8,105	100%
Total votes		8,105	100%
Democratic hold			

=== 2004 ===
North Carolina House of Representatives 63rd district general election, 2004
Party	Candidate	Votes	%
Democratic	Alice Bordsen (incumbent)	12,753	54.89%
Republican	Jerry Rudd	10,482	45.11%
Total votes		23,235	100%
Democratic hold			

=== 2002 ===
North Carolina House of Representatives 63rd district Democratic primary election, 2002
Party	Candidate	Votes	%
Democratic	Alice Bordsen	1,610	45.84%
Democratic	Wiley P. Wooten	1,122	31.95%
Democratic	Jerry D. Doss	780	22.21%
Total votes		3,512	100%

North Carolina House of Representatives 63rd district general election, 2002
Party	Candidate	Votes	%
Democratic	Alice Bordsen	7,914	50.31%
Republican	Robert E. "Rob" Sharpe Jr.	7,817	49.69%
Total votes		15,731	100%
Democratic win (new seat)			

=== 2000 ===
North Carolina House of Representatives 63rd district Republican primary election, 2000
Party	Candidate	Votes	%
Republican	Nancy H. Brown	1,320	55.91%
Republican	Erick P. Little	1,041	44.09%
Total votes		2,361	100%

North Carolina House of Representatives 63rd district general election, 2000
Party	Candidate	Votes	%
Democratic	Jennifer Weiss (incumbent)	16,742	54.99%
Republican	Nancy H. Brown	13,705	45.01%
Total votes		30,447	100%
Democratic hold			
