= North Carolina's 102nd House district =

American legislative district

North Carolina's 102nd State House of Representatives district
Representative
Becky Carney; D–Charlotte
- Demographics: 51% White; 24% Black; 16% Hispanic; 4% Asian; 1% Other; 3% Multiracial
- Population (2024): 88,873

North Carolina's 102nd House district is one of 120 districts in the North Carolina House of Representatives. It has been represented by Democrat Becky Carney since 2003.

== Geography ==
Since 2003, the district has included part of Mecklenburg County. The district overlaps with the 41st and 42nd Senate districts.

== District officeholders ==
Representative	Party	Dates	Notes	Counties
District created January 1, 2003.				2003–Present; Part of Mecklenburg County.
Becky Carney (Charlotte)	Democratic	January 1, 2003 – Present		2003–Present; Part of Mecklenburg County.

== Election results ==
=== 2024 ===
North Carolina House of Representatives 102nd district general election, 2024
Party	Candidate	Votes	%
Democratic	Becky Carney (incumbent)	39,811	100%
Total votes		39,811	100%
Democratic hold			

=== 2022 ===
North Carolina House of Representatives 102nd district general election, 2022
Party	Candidate	Votes	%
Democratic	Becky Carney (incumbent)	22,795	81.70%
Republican	Cynthia Eleanor Clementi	5,107	18.30%
Total votes		27,902	100%
Democratic hold			

=== 2020 ===
North Carolina House of Representatives 102nd district Democratic primary election, 2020
Party	Candidate	Votes	%
Democratic	Becky Carney (incumbent)	9,277	64.19%
Democratic	Jonathan Peebles	3,675	25.43%
Democratic	Leroy Dean	790	5.47%
Democratic	Anthony E. Forman	710	4.91%
Total votes		14,452	100%

North Carolina House of Representatives 102nd district general election, 2020
Party	Candidate	Votes	%
Democratic	Becky Carney (incumbent)	34,931	78.44%
Republican	Kyle Kirby	9,599	21.56%
Total votes		44,530	100%
Democratic hold			

=== 2018 ===
North Carolina House of Representatives 102nd district Democratic primary election, 2018
Party	Candidate	Votes	%
Democratic	Becky Carney (incumbent)	4,366	81.24%
Democratic	Josh Jarrett	1,008	18.76%
Total votes		5,374	100%

North Carolina House of Representatives 102nd district general election, 2018
Party	Candidate	Votes	%
Democratic	Becky Carney (incumbent)	21,609	83.35%
Republican	Tyler Norris	4,316	16.65%
Total votes		25,925	100%
Democratic hold			

=== 2016 ===
North Carolina House of Representatives 102nd district general election, 2016
Party	Candidate	Votes	%
Democratic	Becky Carney (incumbent)	27,836	100%
Total votes		27,836	100%
Democratic hold			

=== 2014 ===
North Carolina House of Representatives 102nd district general election, 2014
Party	Candidate	Votes	%
Democratic	Becky Carney (incumbent)	12,938	100%
Total votes		12,938	100%
Democratic hold			

=== 2012 ===
North Carolina House of Representatives 102nd district general election, 2012
Party	Candidate	Votes	%
Democratic	Becky Carney (incumbent)	26,802	100%
Total votes		26,802	100%
Democratic hold			

=== 2010 ===
North Carolina House of Representatives 102nd district Democratic primary election, 2010
Party	Candidate	Votes	%
Democratic	Becky Carney (incumbent)	1,510	61.76%
Democratic	Kim Ratliff	714	29.20%
Democratic	Ken Davies	221	9.04%
Total votes		2,445	100%

North Carolina House of Representatives 102nd district general election, 2010
Party	Candidate	Votes	%
Democratic	Becky Carney (incumbent)	10,993	100%
Total votes		10,993	100%
Democratic hold			

=== 2008 ===
North Carolina House of Representatives 102nd district general election, 2008
Party	Candidate	Votes	%
Democratic	Becky Carney (incumbent)	21,705	80.72%
Republican	Gregory Patrick Hill	5,183	19.28%
Total votes		26,888	100%
Democratic hold			

=== 2006 ===
North Carolina House of Representatives 102nd district general election, 2006
Party	Candidate	Votes	%
Democratic	Becky Carney (incumbent)	7,994	100%
Total votes		7,994	100%
Democratic hold			

=== 2004 ===
North Carolina House of Representatives 102nd district general election, 2004
Party	Candidate	Votes	%
Democratic	Becky Carney (incumbent)	17,277	100%
Total votes		17,277	100%
Democratic hold			

=== 2002 ===
North Carolina House of Representatives 102nd district Democratic primary election, 2002
Party	Candidate	Votes	%
Democratic	Becky Carney	2,075	52.07%
Democratic	Patsy Kinsey	1,910	47.93%
Total votes		3,985	100%

North Carolina House of Representatives 102nd district general election, 2002
Party	Candidate	Votes	%
Democratic	Becky Carney	10,923	91.00%
Libertarian	Daniel Elmaleh	1,080	9.00%
Total votes		12,003	100%
Democratic hold			
