= Ricky Hurtado =

American politician (born 1988)

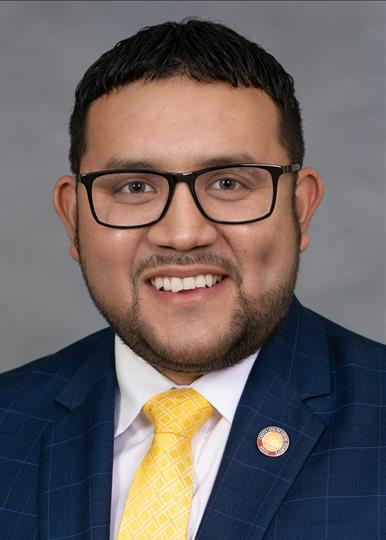
- Official portrait

Member of the North Carolina House of Representatives from the 63rd district
- In office January 1, 2021 – January 1, 2023
- Preceded by: Stephen Ross
- Succeeded by: Stephen Ross

Personal details
- Born: Ricardo Alcides Hurtado; December 7, 1988 (age 37) Los Angeles, California
- Party: Democratic
- Education: University of North Carolina at Chapel Hill (BBA); Princeton University (MPA)

Ricky Hurtado (born December 7, 1988) is an American politician and educator who previously served as a member of the North Carolina House of Representatives from the 63rd district. Elected in November 2020, he assumed office on January 1, 2021.

== Early life and education ==
Hurtado was raised in Sanford, North Carolina, the son of immigrants from El Salvador. He earned a Bachelor of Business Administration from University of North Carolina at Chapel Hill where he was a Morehead-Cain Scholar. He also received a Master of Public Affairs from Princeton University.

== Career ==
From 2010 to 2013, Hurtado worked as a consultant at Frontline Solutions, a business management consultancy service in Durham, North Carolina. He then worked as a public policy intern for the mayor of Philadelphia and for PolicyLink in Oakland, California. As a graduate student, Hurtado was also a teaching assistant at Princeton University. In 2018, Hurtado founded LatinxEd. He has also worked as an adjunct professor at the University of North Carolina at Chapel Hill School of Education and as the executive director of the Scholars' Latino Initiative at UNC-Chapel Hill. Hurtado was elected to the North Carolina House of Representatives in November 2020. When he assumed office, he became the first Latino Democrat to serve in the General Assembly.

He was defeated in the 2022 North Carolina House of Representatives election in a rematch with Stephen Ross.

== Electoral history ==
=== 2022 ===
North Carolina House of Representatives 63rd District General Election, 2022
Party	Candidate	Votes	%
Republican	Stephen Ross	13,955	51.08%
Democratic	Ricky Hurtado (incumbent)	13,367	48.92%
Total votes		27,322	100%
Republican gain from Democratic			

=== 2020 ===
North Carolina House of Representatives 63rd district general election, 2020
Party	Candidate	Votes	%
Democratic	Ricky Hurtado	20,584	50.59%
Republican	Stephen Ross (incumbent)	20,107	49.41%
Total votes		40,691	100%
Democratic gain from Republican			

North Carolina House of Representatives
Preceded by Stephen Ross	Member of the North Carolina House of Representatives from the 63rd district 2021–2023	Succeeded by Stephen Ross
