= 2024 North Carolina House of Representatives election =

- November 5, 2024

All 120 seats in the North Carolina House of Representatives 61 seats needed for a majority
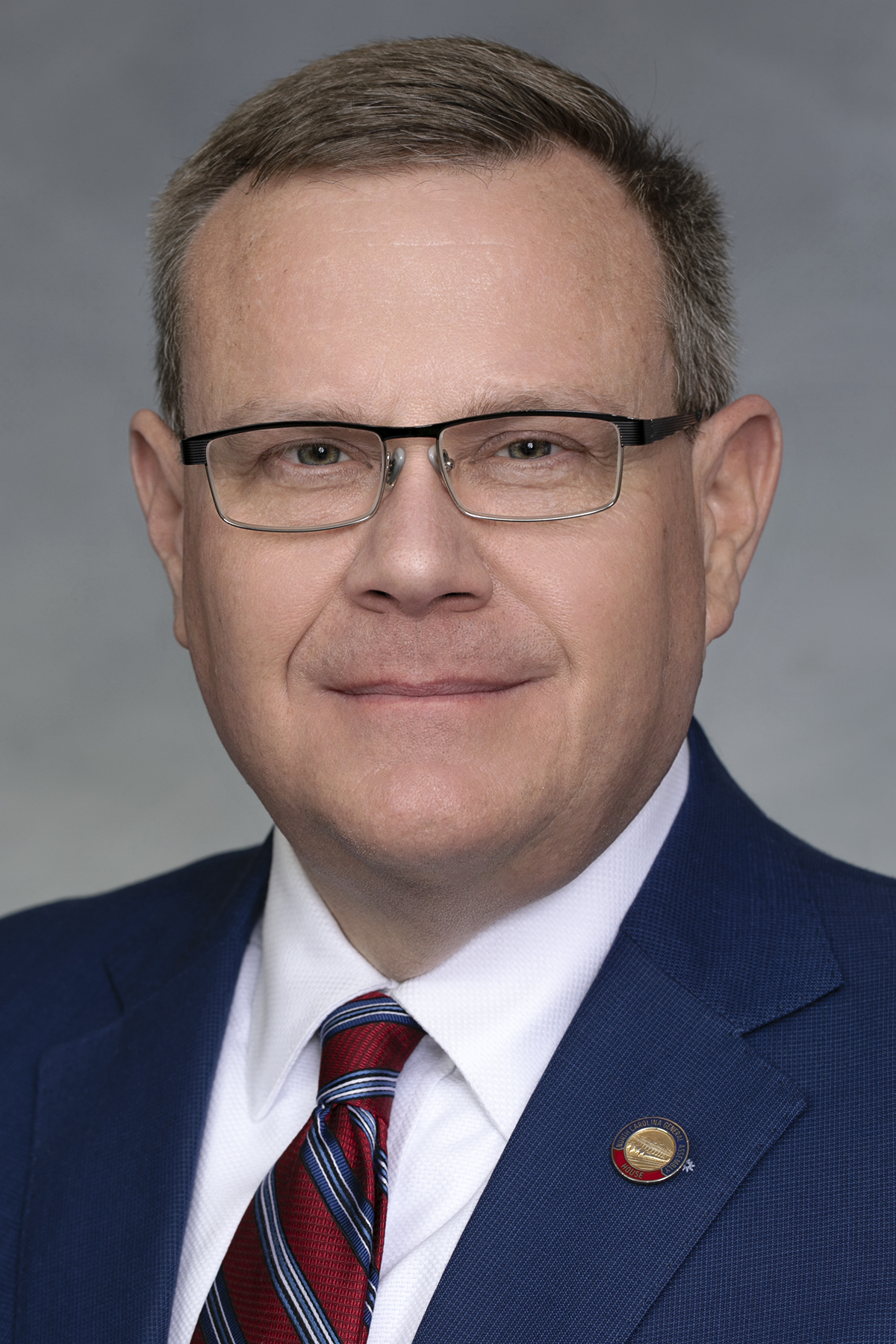

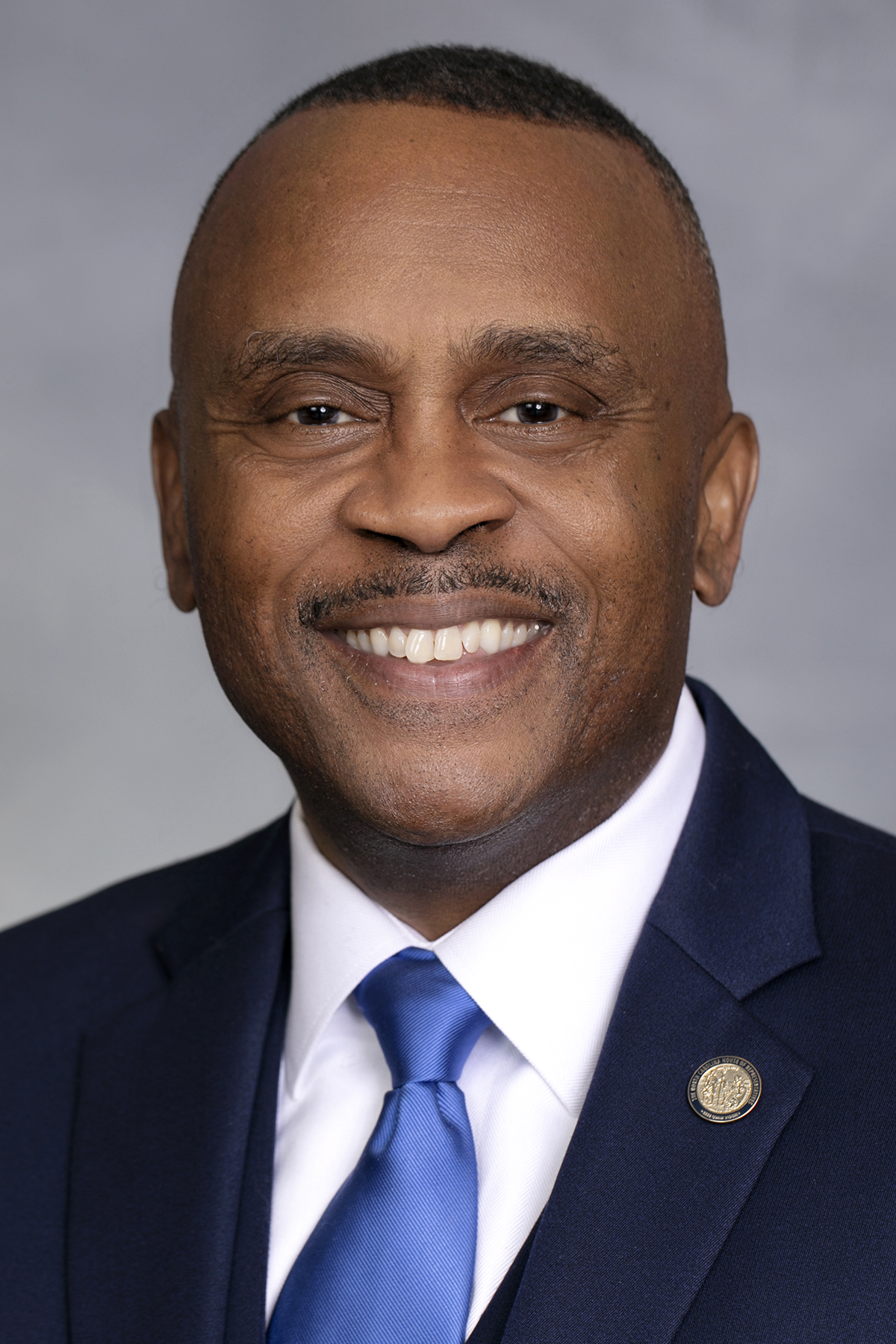
	Majority party	Minority party
Leader	Tim Moore	Robert Reives
Party	Republican	Democratic
Leader since	January 14, 2015	January 1, 2021
Leader's seat	111th – Kings Mountain	54th – Goldston
Last election	71 seats, 59.17%	49 seats, 40.83%
Seats before	72 (Note: Democrat Tricia Cotham switched to the Republican Party on April 4, 2023.)	48
Seats after	71	49
Seat change	▼1	▲1
Popular vote	2,527,117	2,723,032
Percentage	47.51%	51.20%
- Republican gain Democratic gain Republican hold Democratic hold 40-50% 50–60% 60–70% 70–80% >90% 40–50% 50–60% 60-70% 70–80% 80–90% >90%
Speaker before election
Tim Moore
Republican
Elected Speaker
Destin Hall
Republican

The 2024 North Carolina House of Representatives election was held on November 5, 2024, to elect all 120 members to North Carolina's House of Representatives. The election coincided with elections for other offices, including for the U.S. President, U.S. House of Representatives, Council of State, and State Senate. The primary election was held on March 5, 2024. Ahead of the election, districts were redrawn and passed the General Assembly in House Bill 898. Democrats gained one seat, breaking the Republicans' supermajority.

== Predictions ==
Source	Ranking
CNalysis	Solid R

== Partisan background ==
In the 2020 Presidential Election, Trump won in 70 North Carolina House districts, while Biden won 50. As the 2024 election approached, Democrats held three districts where Trump won: District 35 in suburban Raleigh, District 73 around Concord, and District 115 in rural Buncombe County. Republicans, on the other hand, controlled five districts where Biden led: District 5 in Eastern NC, District 24 in Wilson County, District 25 in Nash County, District 32 in Granville and Vance Counties, and District 98 in northern Mecklenburg County.

Biden 40–50% 50–60% 60–70% 70–80% 80–90% / Trump 50–60% 60–70% 70–80%

== Results summary ==
Summary of the November 5, 2024 North Carolina House of Representatives election
Party	Candidates	Votes		Seats		
Party	Candidates	No.	%	Up	Won	+/–
Republican	93	2,527,117	47.513	72	71	▼1
Democratic	117	2,723,032	51.197	48	49	▲1
Libertarian	15	59,996	1.128	0	0	Steady
Write-in	2	8,056	0.151	0	0	Steady
Green	1	546	0.010	0	0	Steady
Total	228	5,318,747	100	120	120	Steady

House seats
Republican	59.17%
Democratic	40.83%

Popular vote
Democratic	51.197%
Republican	47.513%
Libertarian	1.128%
Write-in	0.151%
Green	0.010%

District	Incumbent	Party	Elected	Party
1st	Ed Goodwin	Rep	Ed Goodwin	Rep
2nd	Ray Jeffers	Dem	Ray Jeffers	Dem
3rd	Steve Tyson	Rep	Steve Tyson	Rep
4th	Jimmy Dixon	Rep	Jimmy Dixon	Rep
5th	Bill Ward	Rep	Bill Ward	Rep
6th	Joe Pike	Rep	Joe Pike	Rep
7th	Matthew Winslow	Rep	Matthew Winslow	Rep
8th	Gloristine Brown	Dem	Gloristine Brown	Dem
9th	Timothy Reeder	Rep	Timothy Reeder	Rep
10th	John Bell	Rep	John Bell	Rep
11th	Allison Dahle	Dem	Allison Dahle	Dem
12th	Chris Humphrey	Rep	Chris Humphrey	Rep
13th	Celeste Cairns	Rep	Celeste Cairns	Rep
14th	George Cleveland	Rep	Wyatt Gable	Rep
15th	Phil Shepard	Rep	Phil Shepard	Rep
16th	Carson Smith	Rep	Carson Smith	Rep
17th	Frank Iler	Rep	Frank Iler	Rep
18th	Deb Butler	Dem	Deb Butler	Dem
19th	Charlie Miller	Rep	Charlie Miller	Rep
20th	Ted Davis Jr.	Rep	Ted Davis Jr.	Rep
21st	Ya Liu	Dem	Ya Liu	Dem
22nd	William Brisson	Rep	William Brisson	Rep
23rd	Shelly Willingham	Dem	Shelly Willingham	Dem
24th	Ken Fontenot	Rep	Dante Pittman	Dem
25th	Allen Chesser	Rep	Allen Chesser	Rep
26th	Donna McDowell White	Rep	Donna McDowell White	Rep
27th	Michael Wray	Dem	Rodney Pierce	Dem
28th	Larry Strickland	Rep	Larry Strickland	Rep
29th	Vernetta Alston	Dem	Vernetta Alston	Dem
30th	Marcia Morey	Dem	Marcia Morey	Dem
31st	Zack Forde-Hawkins	Dem	Zack Forde-Hawkins	Dem
32nd	Frank Sossamon	Rep	Bryan Cohn	Dem
33rd	Rosa Gill†	Dem	Monika Johnson-Hostler	Dem
34th	Tim Longest	Dem	Tim Longest	Dem
35th	Terence Everitt†	Dem	Mike Schietzelt	Rep
36th	Julie von Haefen	Dem	Julie von Haefen	Dem
37th	Erin Paré	Rep	Erin Paré	Rep
38th	Abe Jones	Dem	Abe Jones	Dem
39th	James Roberson	Dem	James Roberson	Dem
40th	Joe John	Dem	Joe John	Dem
41st	Maria Cervania	Dem	Maria Cervania	Dem
42nd	Marvin Lucas†	Dem	Mike Colvin	Dem
43rd	Diane Wheatley	Rep	Diane Wheatley	Rep
44th	Charles Smith	Dem	Charles Smith	Dem
45th	Frances Jackson	Dem	Frances Jackson	Dem
46th	Brenden Jones	Rep	Brenden Jones	Rep
47th	Jarrod Lowery	Rep	Jarrod Lowery	Rep
48th	Garland Pierce	Dem	Garland Pierce	Dem
49th	Cynthia Ball	Dem	Cynthia Ball	Dem
50th	Renee Price	Dem	Renee Price	Dem
51st	John Sauls	Rep	John Sauls	Rep
52nd	Ben Moss	Rep	Ben Moss	Rep
53rd	Howard Penny Jr.	Rep	Howard Penny Jr.	Rep
54th	Robert Reives	Dem	Robert Reives	Dem
55th	Mark Brody	Rep	Mark Brody	Rep
56th	Allen Buansi	Dem	Allen Buansi	Dem
57th	Tracy Clark	Dem	Tracy Clark	Dem
58th	Amos Quick	Dem	Amos Quick	Dem
59th	Alan Branson	Rep	Alan Branson	Rep
60th	Cecil Brockman	Dem	Cecil Brockman	Dem
61st	Pricey Harrison	Dem	Pricey Harrison	Dem
62nd	John Blust	Rep	John Blust	Rep
63rd	Stephen Ross	Rep	Stephen Ross	Rep
64th	Dennis Riddell	Rep	Dennis Riddell	Rep
65th	Reece Pyrtle	Rep	Reece Pyrtle	Rep
66th	Sarah Crawford	Dem	Sarah Crawford	Dem
67th	Wayne Sasser†	Rep	Cody Huneycutt	Rep
68th	David Willis	Rep	David Willis	Rep
69th	Dean Arp	Rep	Dean Arp	Rep
70th	Brian Biggs	Rep	Brian Biggs	Rep
71st	Kanika Brown	Dem	Kanika Brown	Dem
72nd	Amber Baker	Dem	Amber Baker	Dem
73rd	Diamond Staton-Williams	Dem	Jonathan Almond	Rep
73rd	Kristin Baker† (Note: Redistricted from the 82nd District.)	Rep	Jonathan Almond	Rep
74th	Jeff Zenger	Rep	Jeff Zenger	Rep
75th	Donny Lambeth	Rep	Donny Lambeth	Rep
76th	Harry Warren	Rep	Harry Warren	Rep
77th	Julia Craven Howard	Rep	Julia Craven Howard	Rep
78th	Neal Jackson	Rep	Neal Jackson	Rep
79th	Keith Kidwell	Rep	Keith Kidwell	Rep
80th	Sam Watford	Rep	Sam Watford	Rep
81st	Larry Potts	Rep	Larry Potts	Rep
82nd	Kevin Crutchfield (Note: Redistricted from the 83rd District.)	Rep	Brian Echevarria	Rep
83rd	New Seat		Grant Campbell	Rep
84th	Jeffrey McNeely	Rep	Jeffrey McNeely	Rep
85th	Dudley Greene	Rep	Dudley Greene	Rep
86th	Hugh Blackwell	Rep	Hugh Blackwell	Rep
87th	Destin Hall	Rep	Destin Hall	Rep
88th	Mary Belk	Dem	Mary Belk	Dem
89th	Mitchell Setzer	Rep	Mitchell Setzer	Rep
90th	Sarah Stevens	Rep	Sarah Stevens	Rep
91st	Kyle Hall	Rep	Kyle Hall	Rep
92nd	Terry Brown	Dem	Terry Brown	Dem
93rd	Ray Pickett	Rep	Ray Pickett	Rep
94th	Blair Eddins	Rep	Blair Eddins	Rep
95th	Grey Mills†	Rep	Todd Carver	Rep
96th	Jay Adams	Rep	Jay Adams	Rep
97th	Heather Rhyne	Rep	Heather Rhyne	Rep
98th	John Bradford†	Rep	Beth Helfrich	Dem
99th	Nasif Majeed	Dem	Nasif Majeed	Dem
100th	John Autry†	Dem	Julia Greenfield	Dem
101st	Carolyn Logan	Dem	Carolyn Logan	Dem
102nd	Becky Carney	Dem	Becky Carney	Dem
103rd	Laura Budd	Dem	Laura Budd	Dem
103rd	Wesley Harris† (Note: Redistricted from the 105th district.)	Dem	Laura Budd	Dem
104th	Brandon Lofton	Dem	Brandon Lofton	Dem
105th	Tricia Cotham (Note: Redistricted from the 112th district.)	Rep	Tricia Cotham	Rep
106th	Carla Cunningham	Dem	Carla Cunningham	Dem
107th	Bobby Drakeford†	Dem	Aisha Dew	Dem
108th	John Torbett	Rep	John Torbett	Rep
109th	Donnie Loftis	Rep	Donnie Loftis	Rep
110th	Kelly Hastings	Rep	Kelly Hastings	Rep
111th	Tim Moore†	Rep	Paul Scott	Rep
112th	New Seat		Jordan Lopez	Dem
113th	Jake Johnson	Rep	Jake Johnson	Rep
114th	Eric Ager	Dem	Eric Ager	Dem
115th	Lindsey Prather	Dem	Lindsey Prather	Dem
116th	Caleb Rudow†	Dem	Brian Turner	Dem
117th	Jennifer Balkcom	Rep	Jennifer Balkcom	Rep
118th	Mark Pless	Rep	Mark Pless	Rep
119th	Mike Clampitt	Rep	Mike Clampitt	Rep
120th	Karl Gillespie	Rep	Karl Gillespie	Rep

† - Incumbent not seeking re-election

=== Close races ===
Districts where the margin of victory was under 10%:

1. District 105, 0.4%
2. District 32, 0.53% (gain)
3. District 25, 0.94%
4. District 24, 2.2% (gain)
5. District 115, 2.92%
6. District 35, 3.19% (gain)
7. District 74, 3.64%
8. District 48, 3.84%
9. District 98, 4.4% (gain)
10. District 37, 6.09%
11. District 73, 6.42% (gain)
12. District 62, 6.9%
13. District 5, 8.32%
14. District 82, 8.7%
15. District 54, 9.52%
16. District 64, 9.68%

=== Retiring incumbents ===
==== Democrats ====
- District 33: Rosa Gill retired.
- District 35: Terence Everitt retired to run for State Senate.
- District 42: Marvin Lucas retired.
- District 100: John Autry retired.
- District 103: Wesley Harris retired to run for Treasurer.
- District 107: Kelly Alexander announced retirement. Died on September 6, 2024. Bobby Drakeford was nominated to succeed him.
- District 116: Caleb Rudow retired to run for U.S. House.

==== Republicans ====
- District 62: John Faircloth retired.
- District 67: Wayne Sasser retired.
- District 73: Kristin Baker retired.
- District 94: Jeffrey Elmore retired to run for Lieutenant Governor.
- District 95: Grey Mills retired to run for U.S. House.
- District 98: John Bradford retired to run for U.S. House.
- District 111: Tim Moore retired to run for U.S. House.

=== Incumbents defeated in primary elections ===
==== Democrats ====
- District 27: Michael Wray lost renomination to Rodney Pierce.

==== Republicans ====
- District 14: George Cleveland lost renomination to Wyatt Gable.
- District 82: Kevin Crutchfield lost renomination to Brian Echevarria.

=== Incumbents defeated in the general election ===
==== Democrats ====
- Diamond Staton-Williams (D-District 73), defeated by Jonathan Almond (R)

==== Republicans ====
- Ken Fontenot (R-District 24), defeated by Dante Pittman (D)
- Frank Sossamon (R-District 32), defeated by Bryan Cohn (D)

=== Open seats that changed parties ===
- Terence Everitt (D-District 35) retired to run for State Senate, seat won by Mike Schietzelt (R)
- John Bradford (R-District 98) retired to run for Congress, seat won by Beth Helfrich (D)

=== Newly created seats ===
- District 83 (Rowan & Cabarrus Counties), won by Grant Campbell (R)
- District 112 (Mecklenburg County), won by Jordan Lopez (D)

== Detailed results ==
=== Districts 1-19 ===
==== District 1 ====
2024 North Carolina's 1st House district election
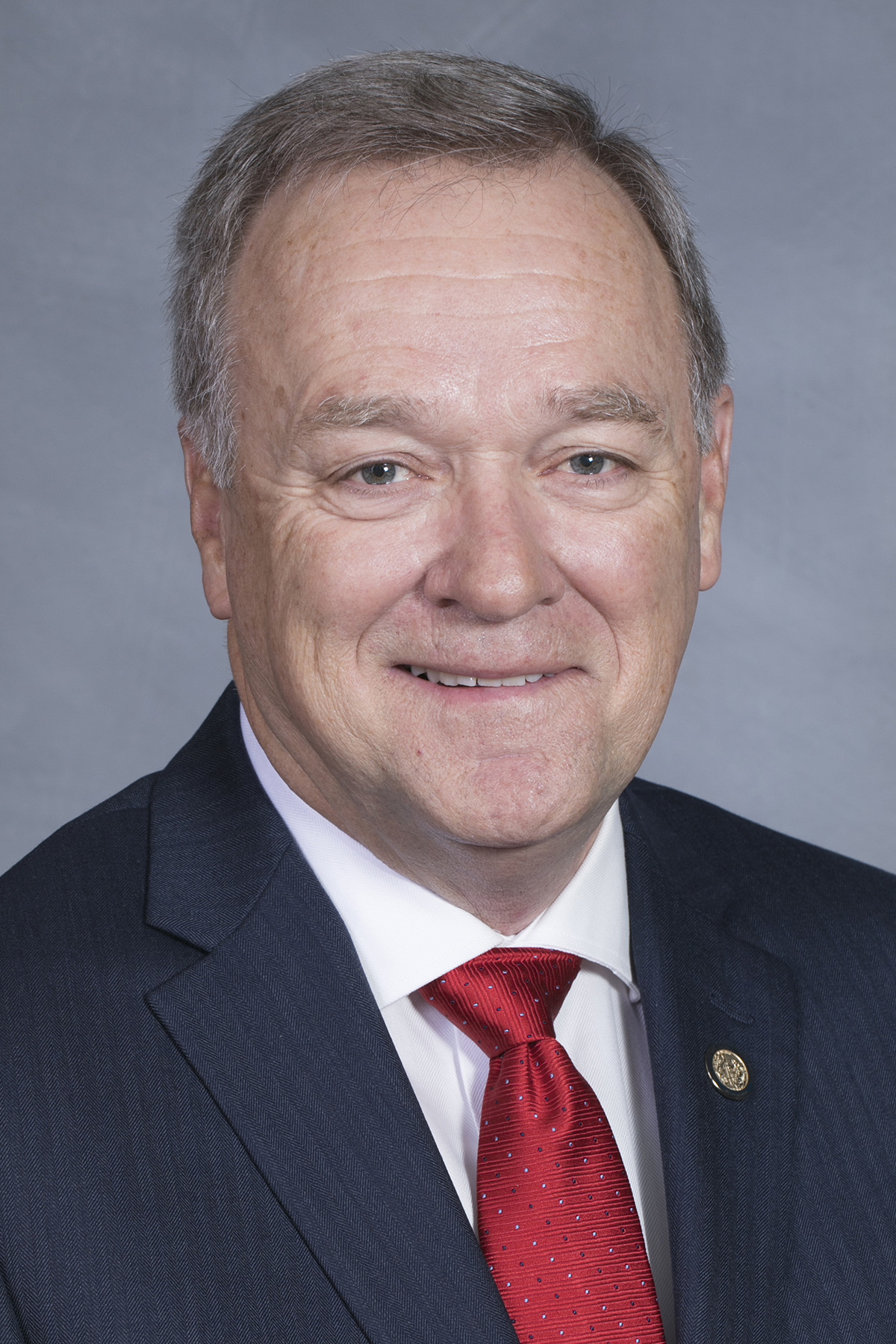

Nominee	Ed Goodwin	Susan Sawin
Party	Republican	Democratic
Popular vote	31,950	17,160
Percentage	65.06%	34.94%
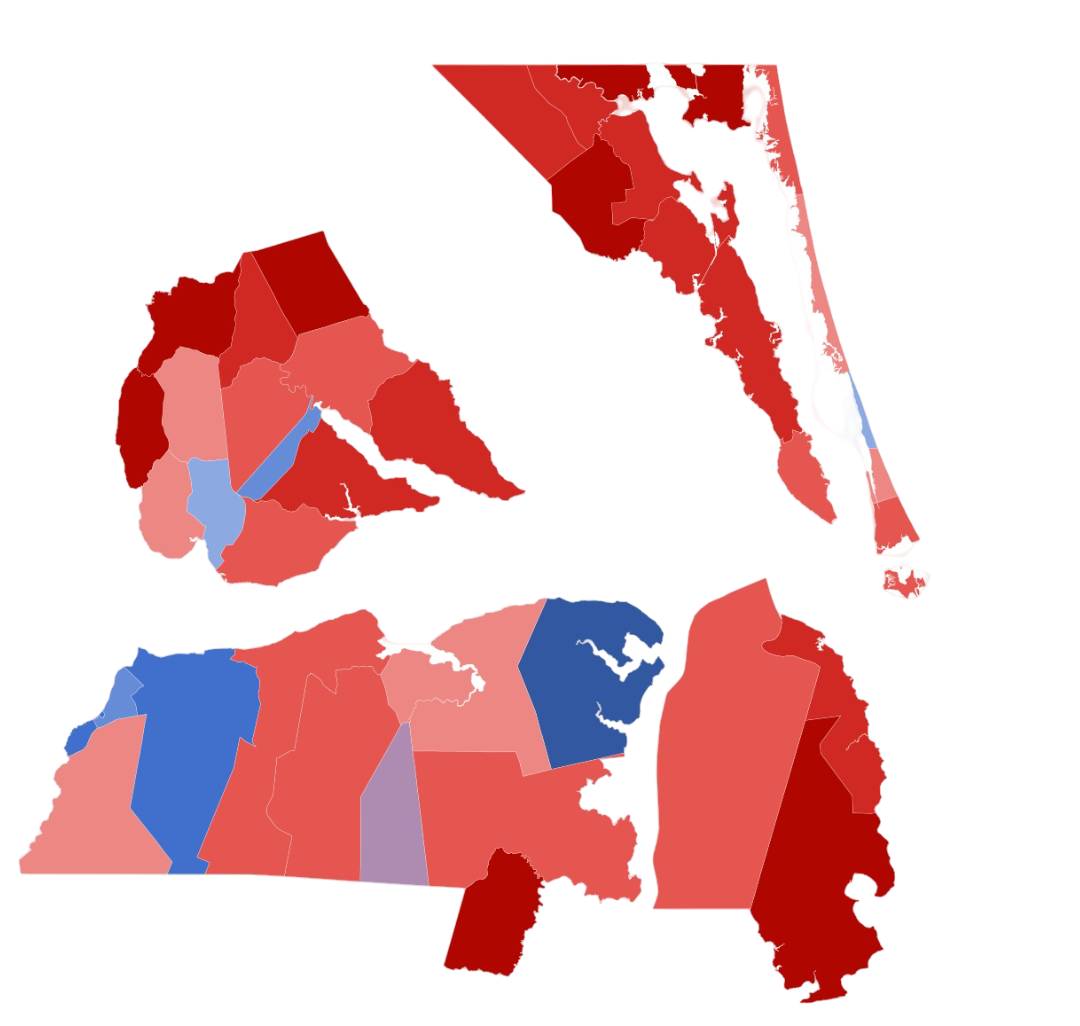
- Goodwin: 50–60% 60–70% 70–80% 80–90% Sawin: 50–60% 60–70% 70-80% 80-90% Tie
State Representative before election
Ed Goodwin
Republican
Elected State Representative
Ed Goodwin
Republican

The new 1st district includes all of Chowan, Currituck, Perquimans, Tyrrell, and Washington counties, as well as portions of northwestern Dare County. It includes the home of incumbent Republican Ed Goodwin, who has represented the 1st district since 2019.

North Carolina House of Representatives 1st district general election, 2024
Party	Candidate	Votes	%
Republican	Ed Goodwin (incumbent)	31,950	65.06%
Democratic	Susan Sawin	17,160	34.94%
Total votes		49,110	100%
Republican hold			

==== District 2 ====
2024 North Carolina's 2nd House district election
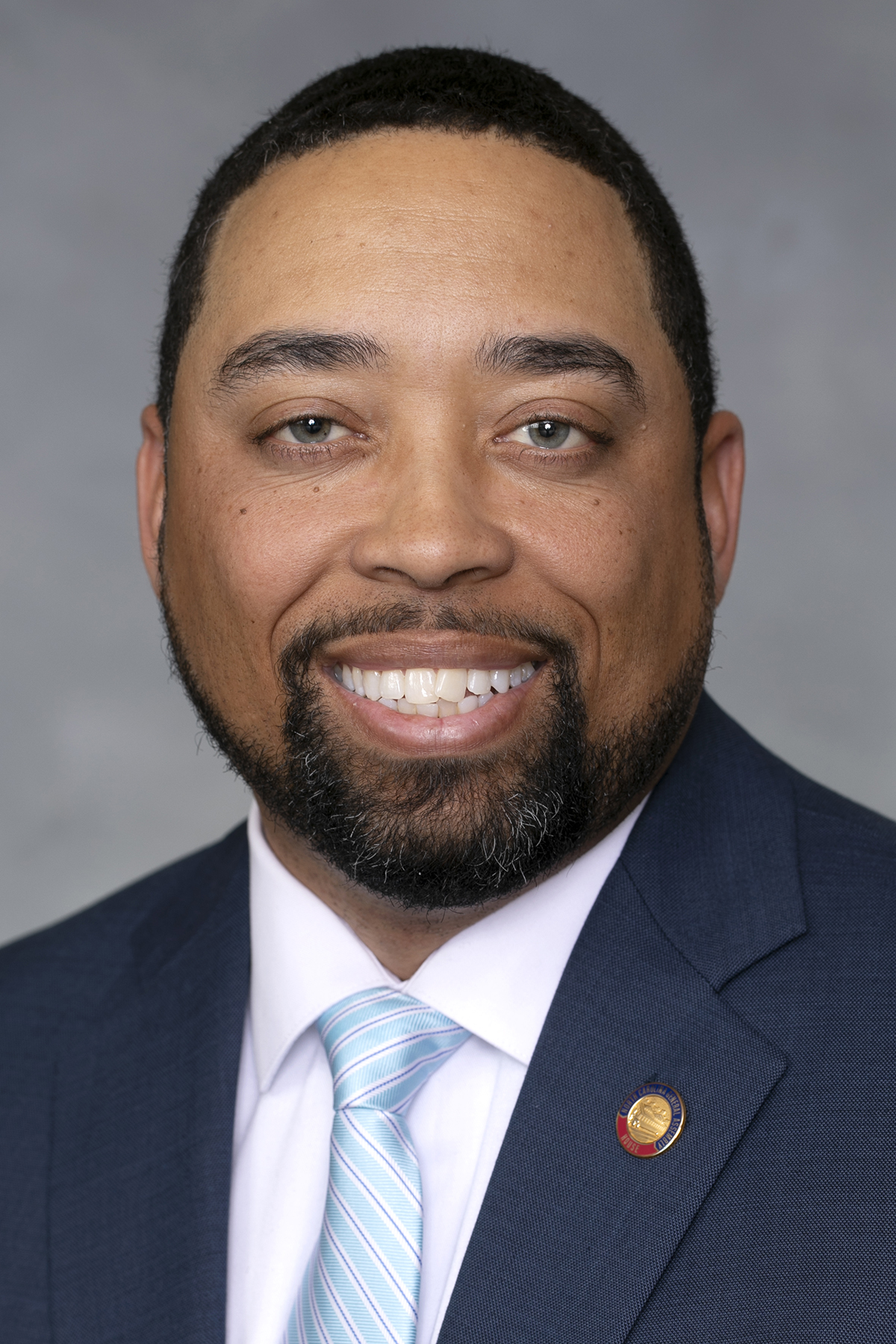

Nominee	Ray Jeffers	Jason Chambers
Party	Democratic	Republican
Popular vote	28,332	20,874
Percentage	57.58%	42.42%
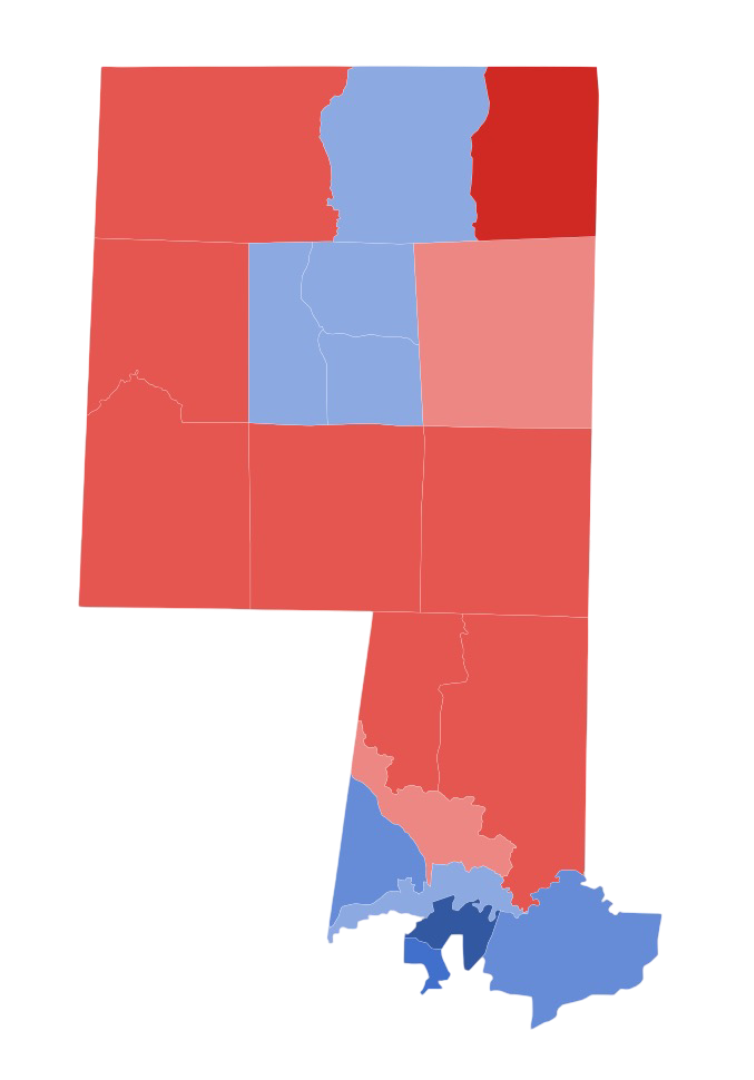
- Jeffers: 50–60% 60–70% 70-80% 80-90% Chambers: 50–60% 60–70% 70–80%
State Representative before election
Ray Jeffers
Democratic
Elected State Representative
Ray Jeffers
Democratic

The new 2nd district includes all of Person County and portions of northern Durham County. It includes the home of incumbent Democrat Ray Jeffers, who has represented the 2nd district since 2023.

North Carolina House of Representatives 2nd district general election, 2024
Party	Candidate	Votes	%
Democratic	Ray Jeffers (incumbent)	28,332	57.58%
Republican	Jason Chambers	20,874	42.42%
Total votes		49,206	100%
Democratic hold			

==== District 3 ====
2024 North Carolina's 3rd House district election
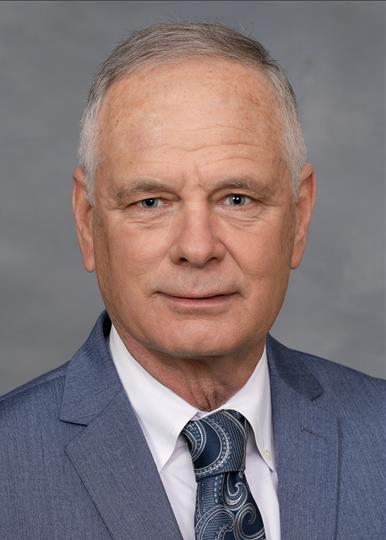

Nominee	Steve Tyson	Linda Moore
Party	Republican	Democratic
Popular vote	29,825	18,530
Percentage	61.68%	38.32%
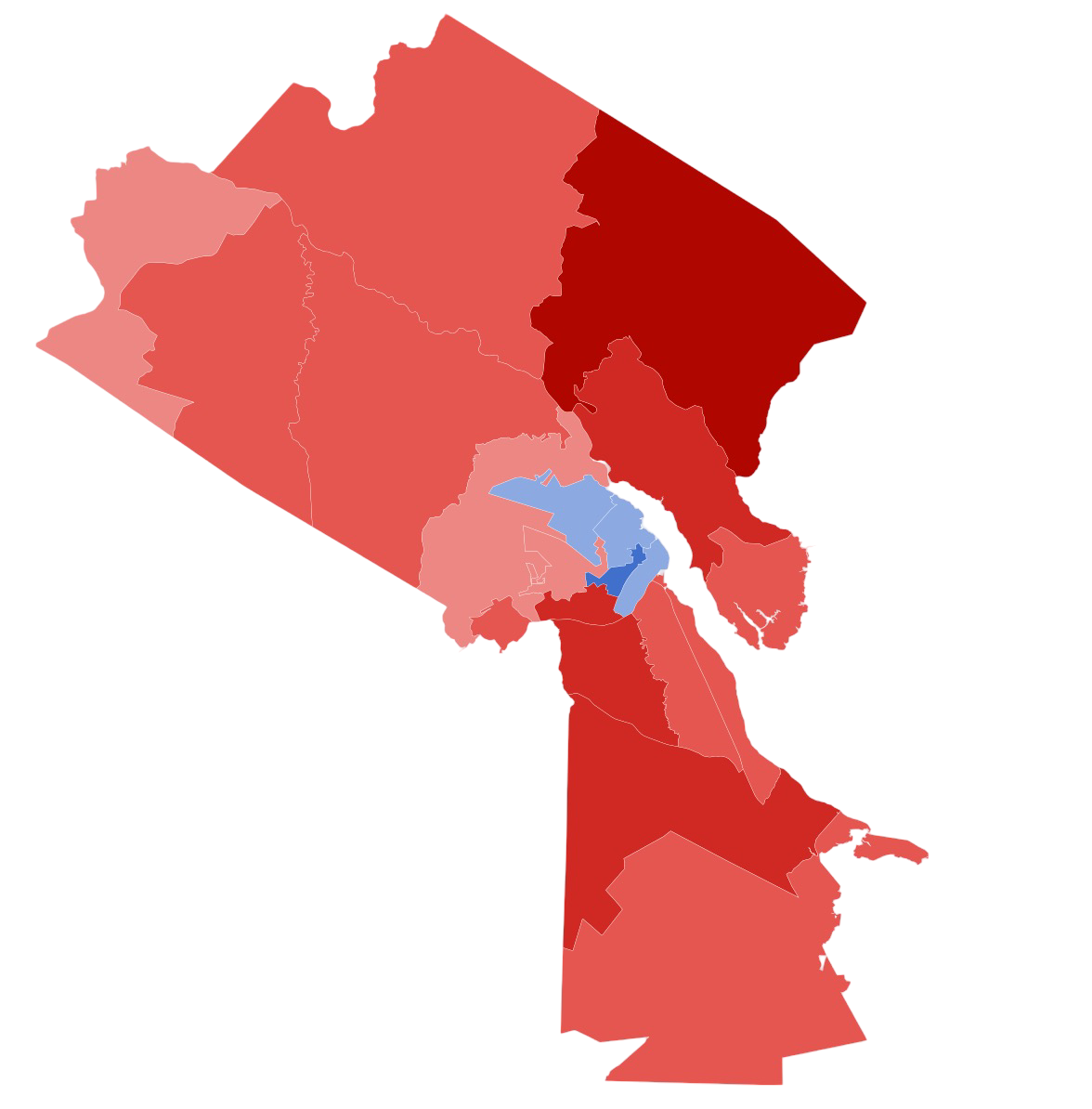
- Tyson: 50–60% 60–70% 70–80% 80-90% Moore: 50–60% 70-80%
State Representative before election
Steve Tyson
Republican
Elected State Representative
Steve Tyson
Republican

The new 3rd district includes most of Craven County. It includes the home of incumbent Republican Steve Tyson, who has represented the 3rd district since 2021.

North Carolina House of Representatives 3rd district Democratic primary election, 2024
Party	Candidate	Votes	%
Democratic	Linda Moore	1,948	38.56%
Democratic	Dorothea Downing White	1,820	36.03%
Democratic	Cynthia Evans-Robinson	1,284	25.42%
Total votes		5,052	100%

North Carolina House of Representatives 3rd district general election, 2024
Party	Candidate	Votes	%
Republican	Steve Tyson (incumbent)	29,825	61.68%
Democratic	Linda Moore	18,530	38.32%
Total votes		48,355	100%
Republican hold			

==== District 4 ====
2024 North Carolina's 4th House district election
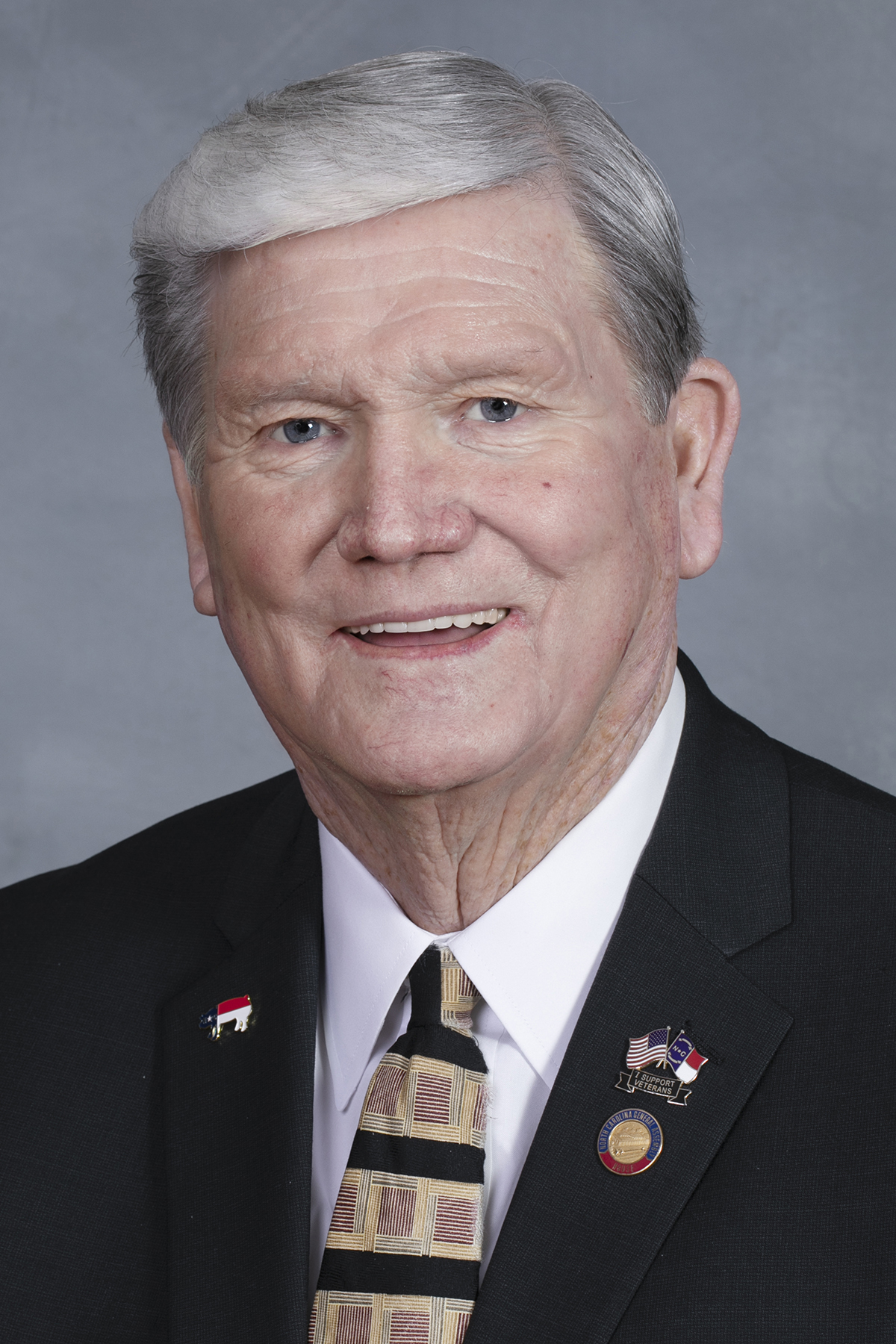

Nominee	Jimmy Dixon	Vernon Moore
Party	Republican	Democratic
Popular vote	22,093	12,961
Percentage	63.03%	36.97%
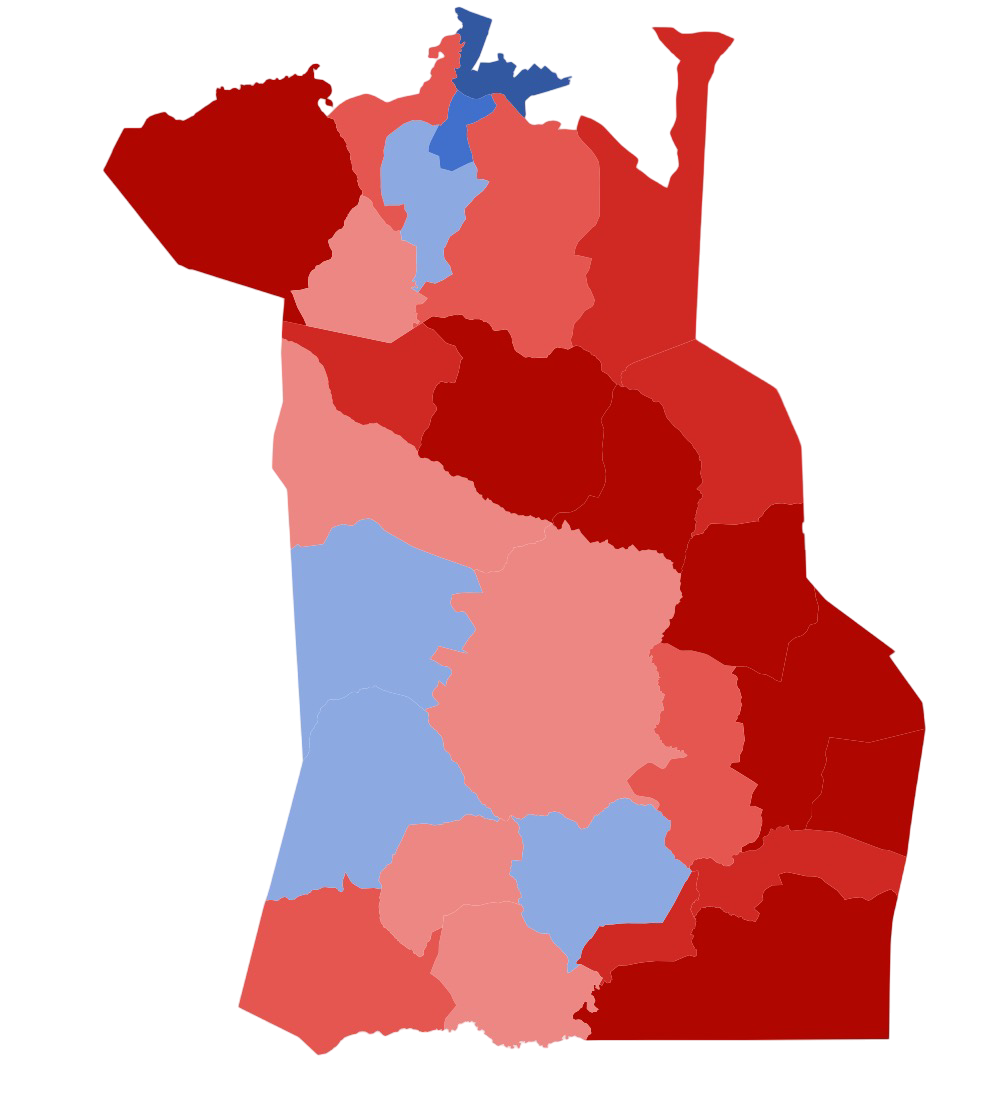
- Dixon: 50–60% 60–70% 70–80% 80-90% Moore: 50–60% 70-80% 80-90%
State Representative before election
Jimmy Dixon
Republican
Elected State Representative
Jimmy Dixon
Republican

The new 4th district includes all of Duplin County, and portions of southern Wayne County. It includes the home of incumbent Republican Jimmy Dixon, who has represented the 4th district since 2011.

North Carolina House of Representatives 4th district general election, 2024
Party	Candidate	Votes	%
Republican	Jimmy Dixon (incumbent)	22,093	63.03%
Democratic	Vernon Moore	12,961	36.97%
Total votes		35,054	100%
Republican hold			

==== District 5 ====
2024 North Carolina's 5th House district election
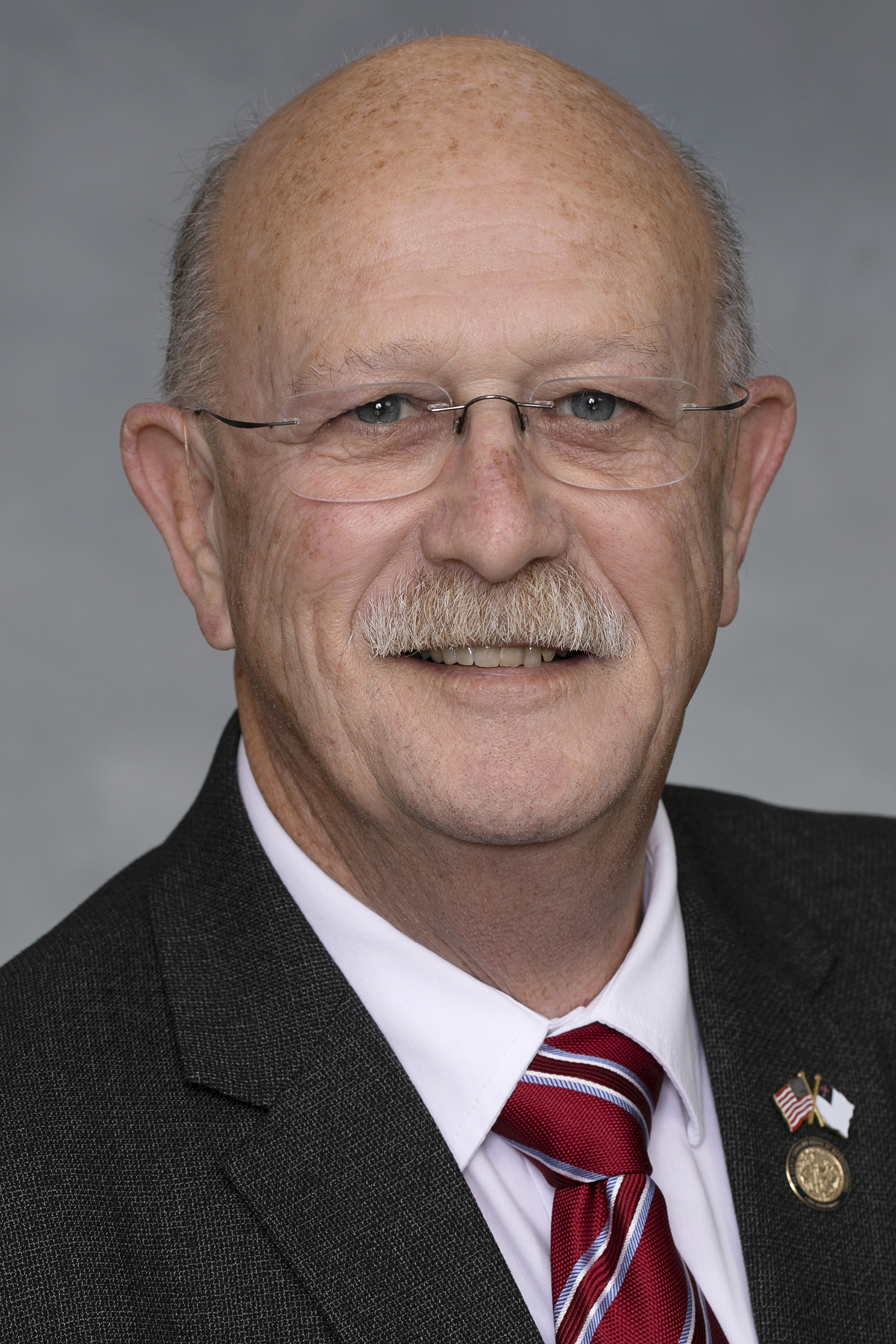

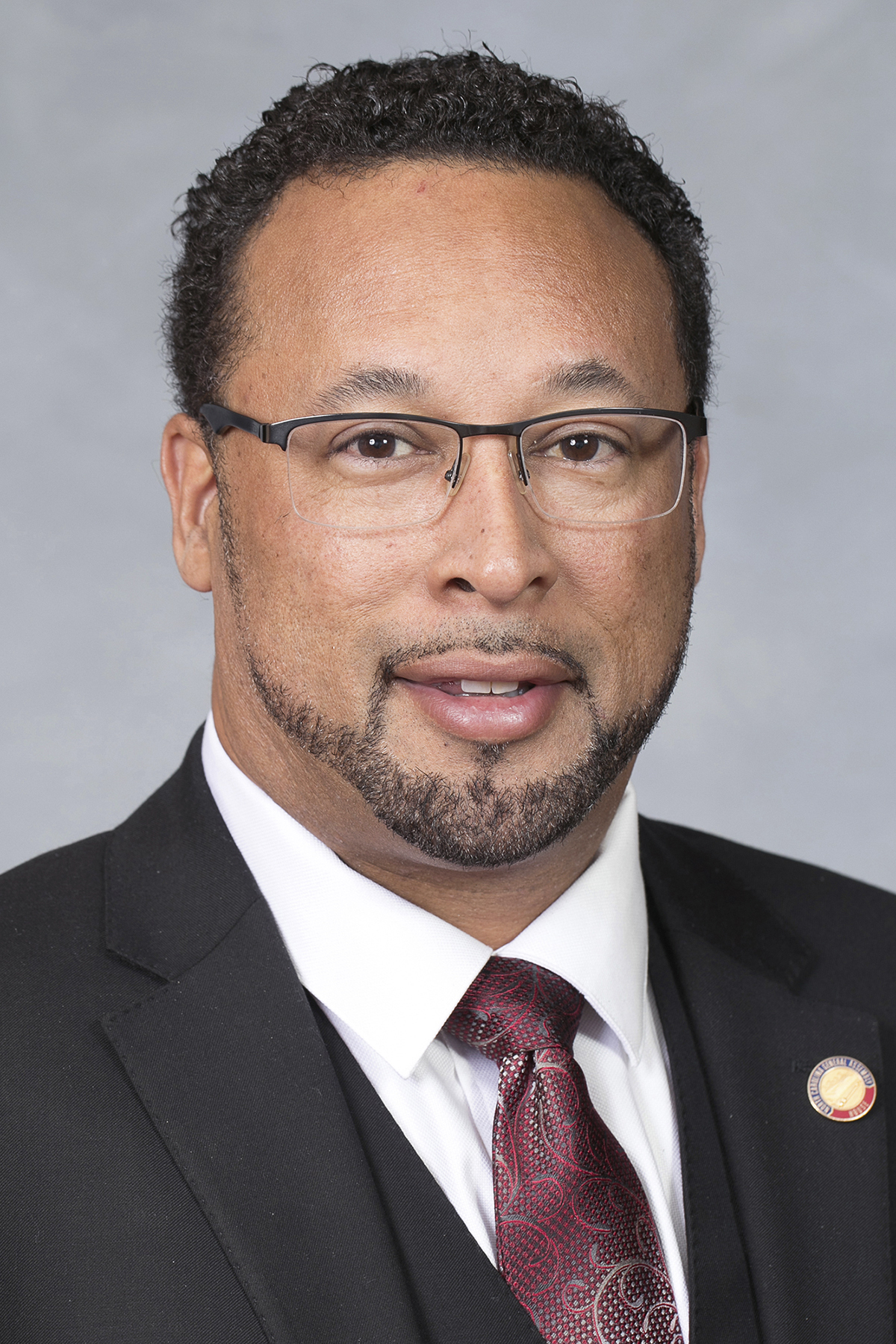
Nominee	Bill Ward	Howard Hunter III
Party	Republican	Democratic
Popular vote	22,357	18,924
Percentage	54.16%	45.84%
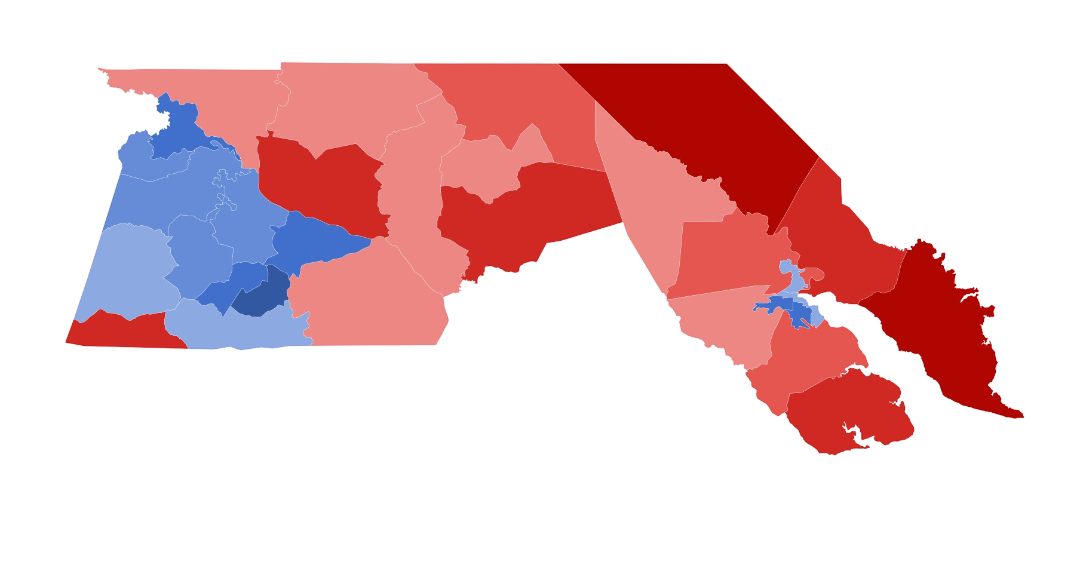
- Ward: 50–60% 60–70% 70–80% 80-90% Hunter III: 50–60% 60–70% 70-80% 80-90%
State Representative before election
Bill Ward
Republican
Elected State Representative
Bill Ward
Republican

The new 5th district includes all of Camden, Gates, Hertford, and Pasquotank counties. It includes the home of incumbent Republican Bill Ward, who has represented the 5th district since 2023.

North Carolina House of Representatives 5th district general election, 2024
Party	Candidate	Votes	%
Republican	Bill Ward (incumbent)	22,357	54.16%
Democratic	Howard Hunter III	18,924	45.84%
Total votes		41,281	100%
Republican hold			

==== District 6 ====
2024 North Carolina's 6th House district election
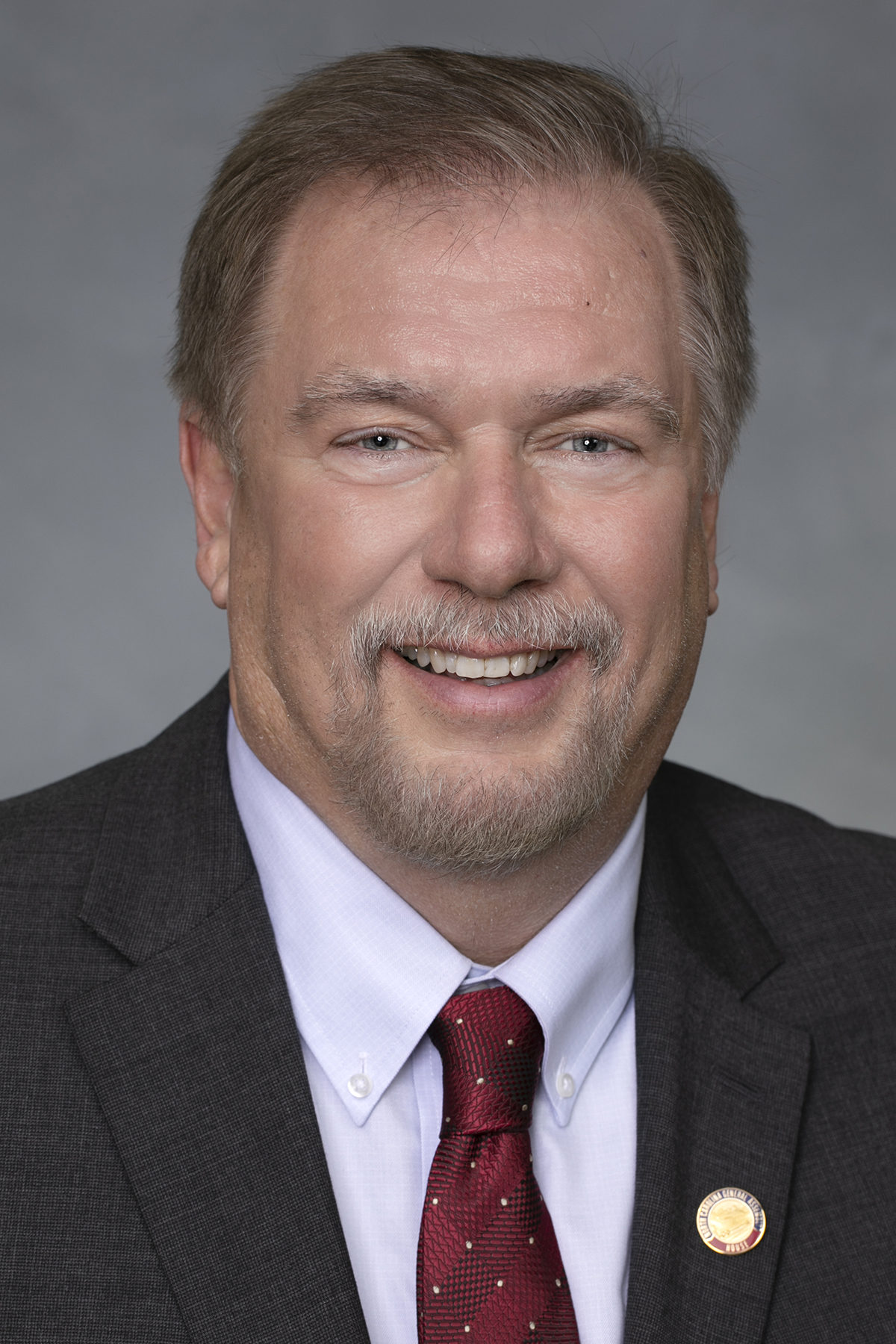

Nominee	Joe Pike	Kiara Johnson
Party	Republican	Democratic
Popular vote	24,190	15,704
Percentage	60.64%	39.36%
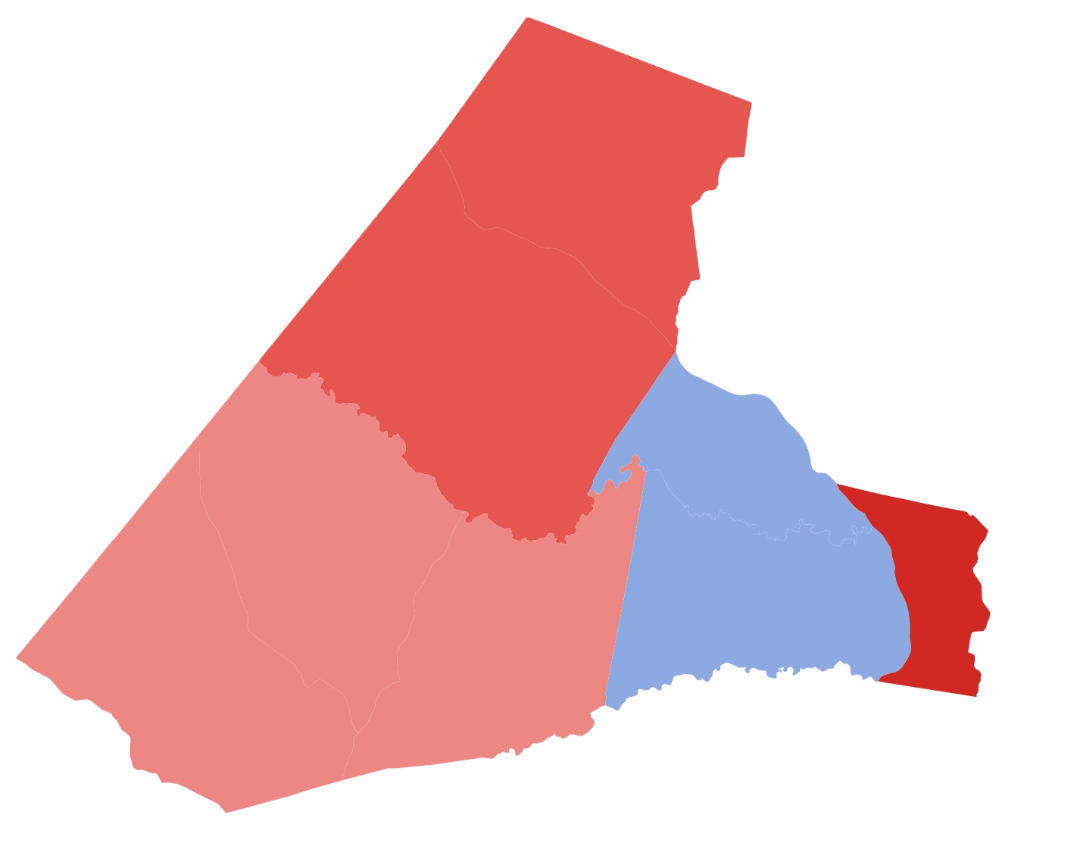
- Pike: 50–60% 60–70% 70–80% Johnson: 50–60%
State Representative before election
Joe Pike
Republican
Elected State Representative
Joe Pike
Republican

The new 6th district includes most of Harnett County. It includes the home of incumbent Republican Joe Pike, who has represented the 6th district since 2023.

North Carolina House of Representatives 6th district general election, 2024
Party	Candidate	Votes	%
Republican	Joe Pike (incumbent)	24,190	60.64%
Democratic	Kiara Johnson	15,704	39.36%
Total votes		39,894	100%
Republican hold			

==== District 7 ====
2024 North Carolina's 7th House district election
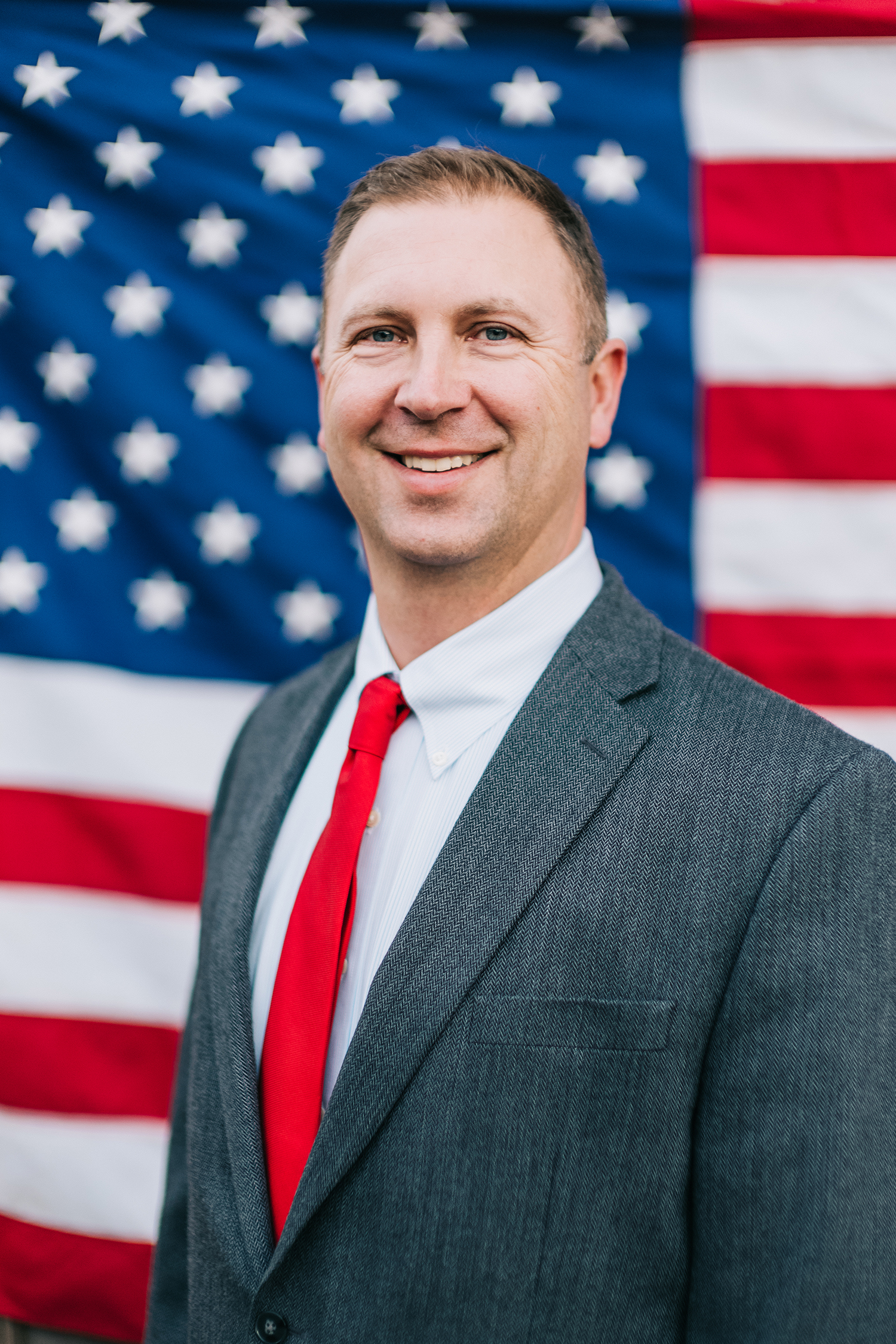

Nominee	Matthew Winslow	Jesse Goslen
Party	Republican	Democratic
Popular vote	27,099	20,655
Percentage	55.32%	42.17%
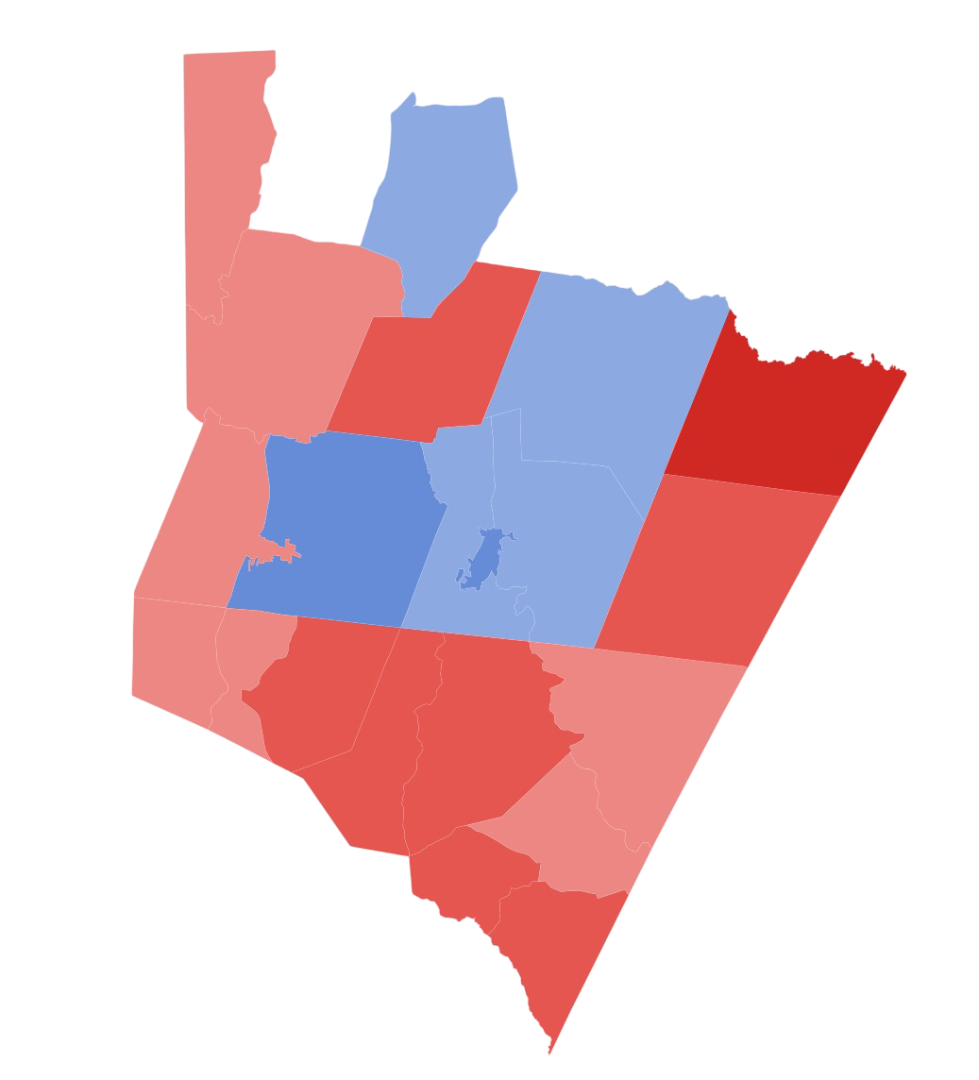
- Winslow: 50–60% 60–70% 70–80% Goslen: 50–60% 60–70%
State Representative before election
Matthew Winslow
Republican
Elected State Representative
Matthew Winslow
Republican

The new 7th district includes all of Franklin County and portions of southern Vance County. It includes the home of incumbent Republican Matthew Winslow, who has represented the 7th district since 2021.

North Carolina House of Representatives 7th district general election, 2024
Party	Candidate	Votes	%
Republican	Matthew Winslow (incumbent)	27,099	55.32%
Democratic	Jesse Goslen	20,655	42.17%
Libertarian	Gavin Bell	1,231	2.51%
Total votes		48,985	100%
Republican hold			

==== District 8 ====
2024 North Carolina's 8th House district election
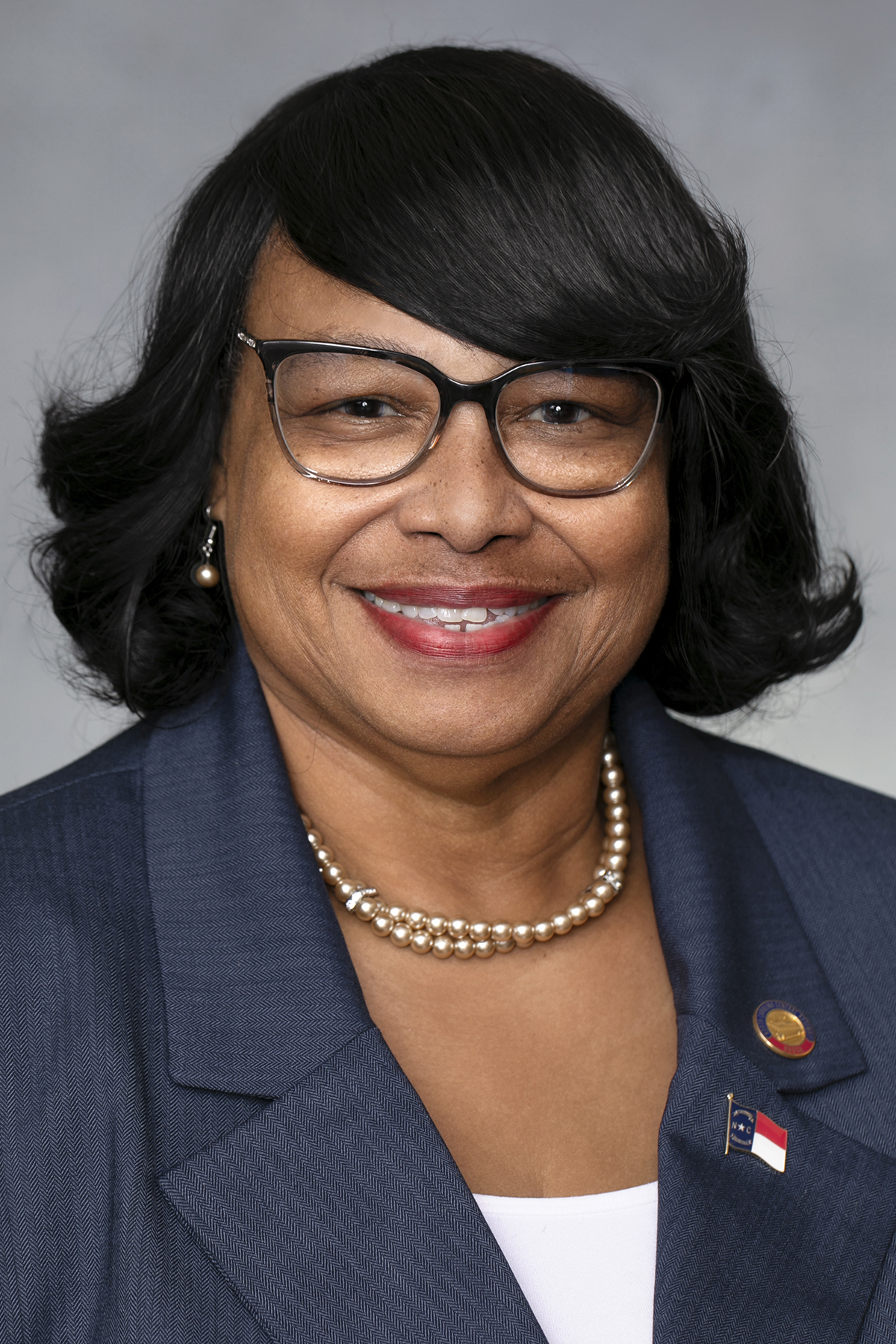

Nominee	Gloristine Brown	Angelene Mitchell
Party	Democratic	Republican
Popular vote	22,722	12,764
Percentage	64.03%	35.97%
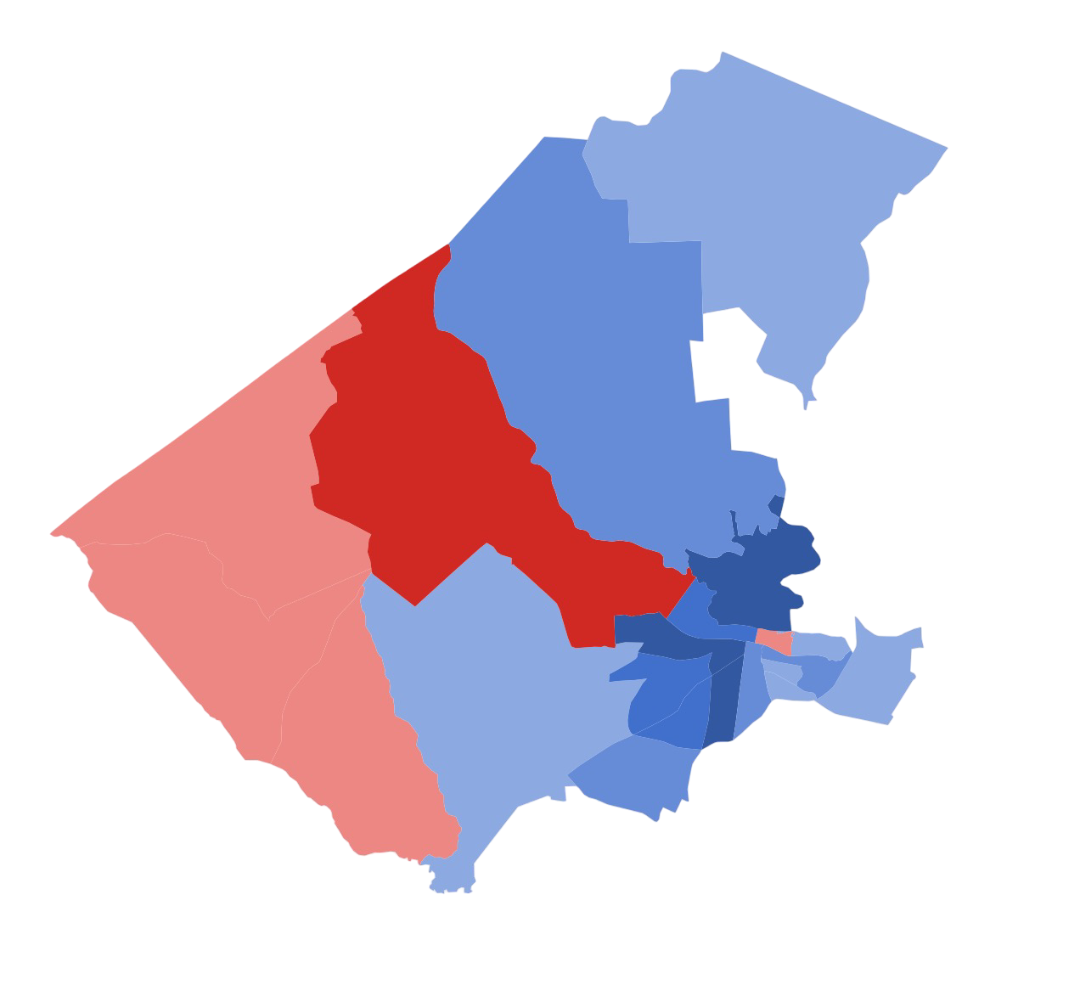
- Brown: 50–60% 60–70% 70-80% 80-90% Goslen: 50–60% 70–80%
State Representative before election
Gloristine Brown
Democratic
Elected State Representative
Gloristine Brown
Democratic

The new 8th district includes portions of western Pitt County. It includes the home of incumbent Democrat Gloristine Brown, who has represented the 8th district since 2023.

North Carolina House of Representatives 8th district general election, 2024
Party	Candidate	Votes	%
Democratic	Gloristine Brown (incumbent)	22.722	64.03%
Republican	Angelene Mitchell	12,764	35.97%
Total votes		35,486	100%
Democratic hold			

==== District 9 ====
2024 North Carolina's 9th House district election
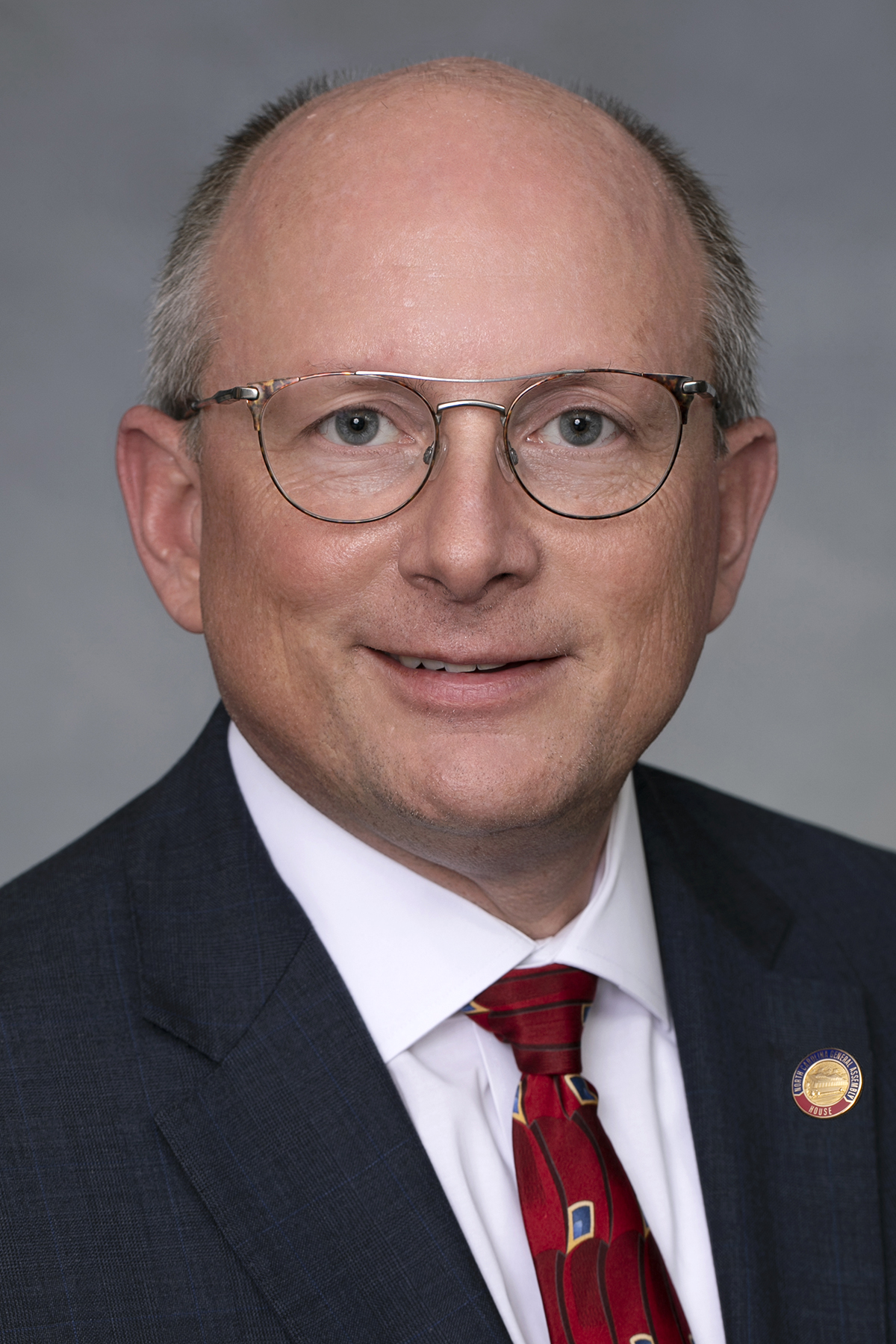

Nominee	Timothy Reeder	Claire Kempner
Party	Republican	Democratic
Popular vote	26,888	21,173
Percentage	55.95%	44.05%
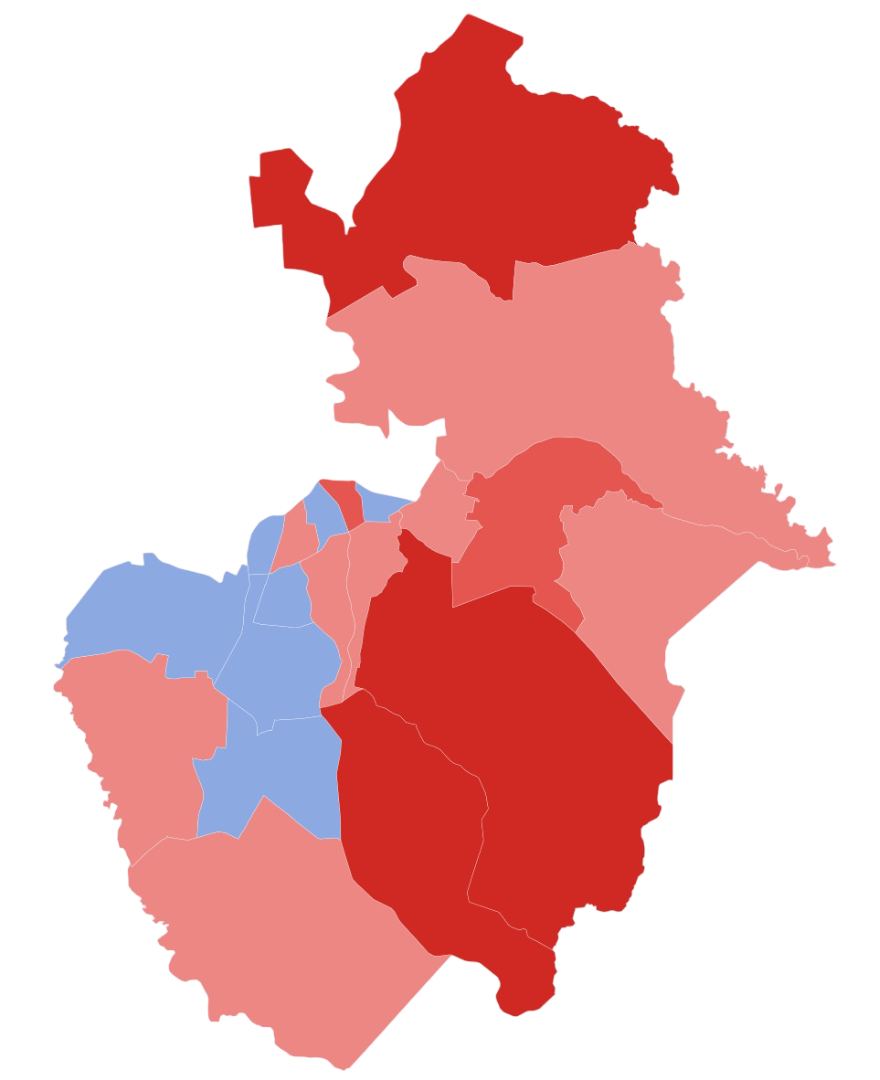
- Reeder: 50–60% 60–70% 70–80% Kempner: 50–60%
State Representative before election
Timothy Reeder
Republican
Elected State Representative
Timothy Reeder
Republican

The new 9th district includes portions of eastern Pitt County. It includes the home of incumbent Republican Timothy Reeder, who has represented the 9th district since 2023.

North Carolina House of Representatives 9th district Democratic primary election, 2024
Party	Candidate	Votes	%
Democratic	Claire Kempner	3,624	70.95%
Democratic	Lenton Brown	1,484	29.05%
Total votes		5,108	100%

North Carolina House of Representatives 9th district Republican primary election, 2024
Party	Candidate	Votes	%
Republican	Timothy Reeder (incumbent)	6,919	78.70%
Republican	Tony Moore	1,873	21.30%
Total votes		8,792	100%

North Carolina House of Representatives 9th district general election, 2024
Party	Candidate	Votes	%
Republican	Timothy Reeder (incumbent)	26,888	55.95%
Democratic	Claire Kempner	21,173	44.05%
Total votes		48,061	100%
Republican hold			

==== District 10 ====
2024 North Carolina's 10th House district election
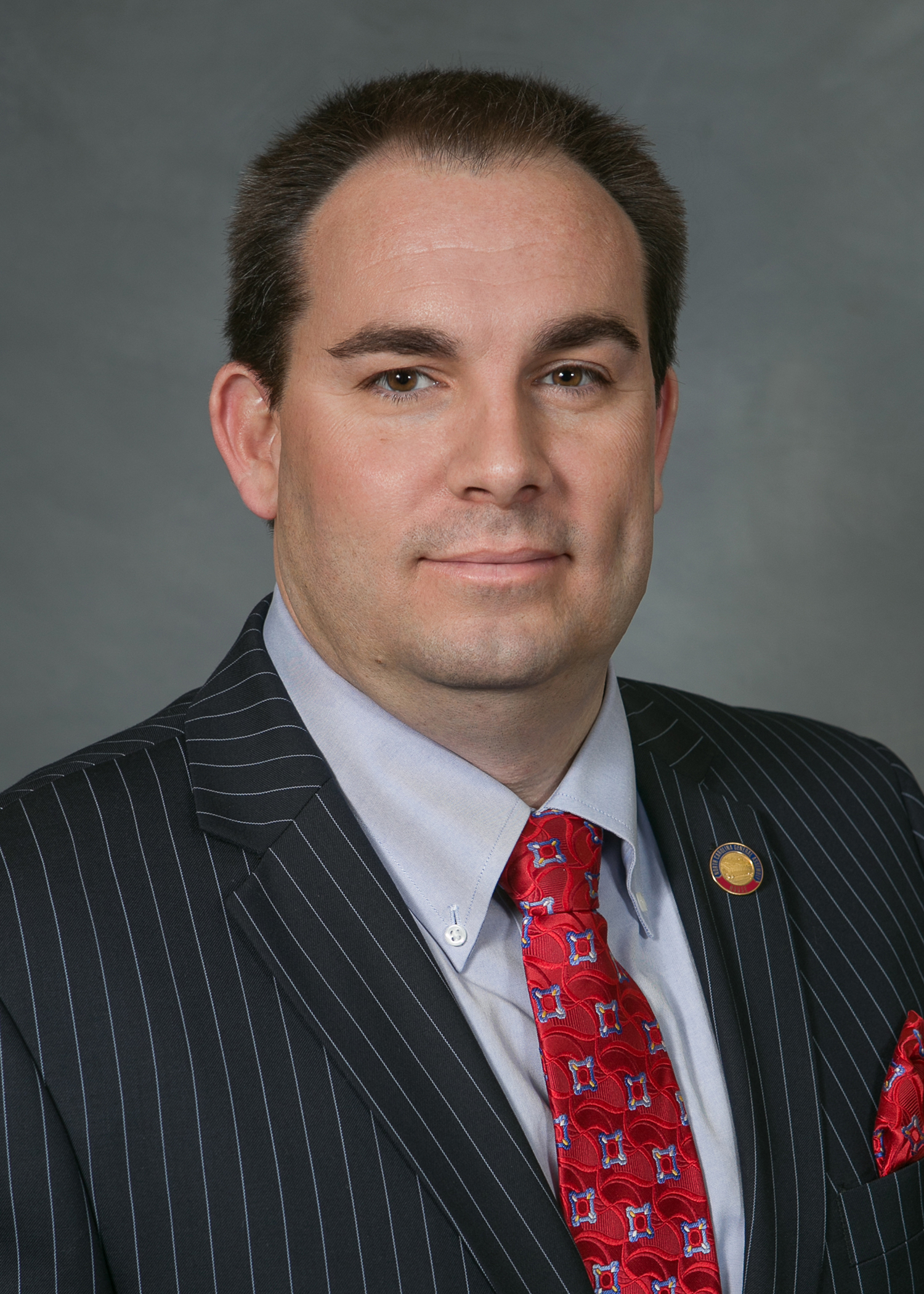

Nominee	John Bell	Beatrice Jones
Party	Republican	Democratic
Popular vote	24,475	15,789
Percentage	60.79%	39.21%
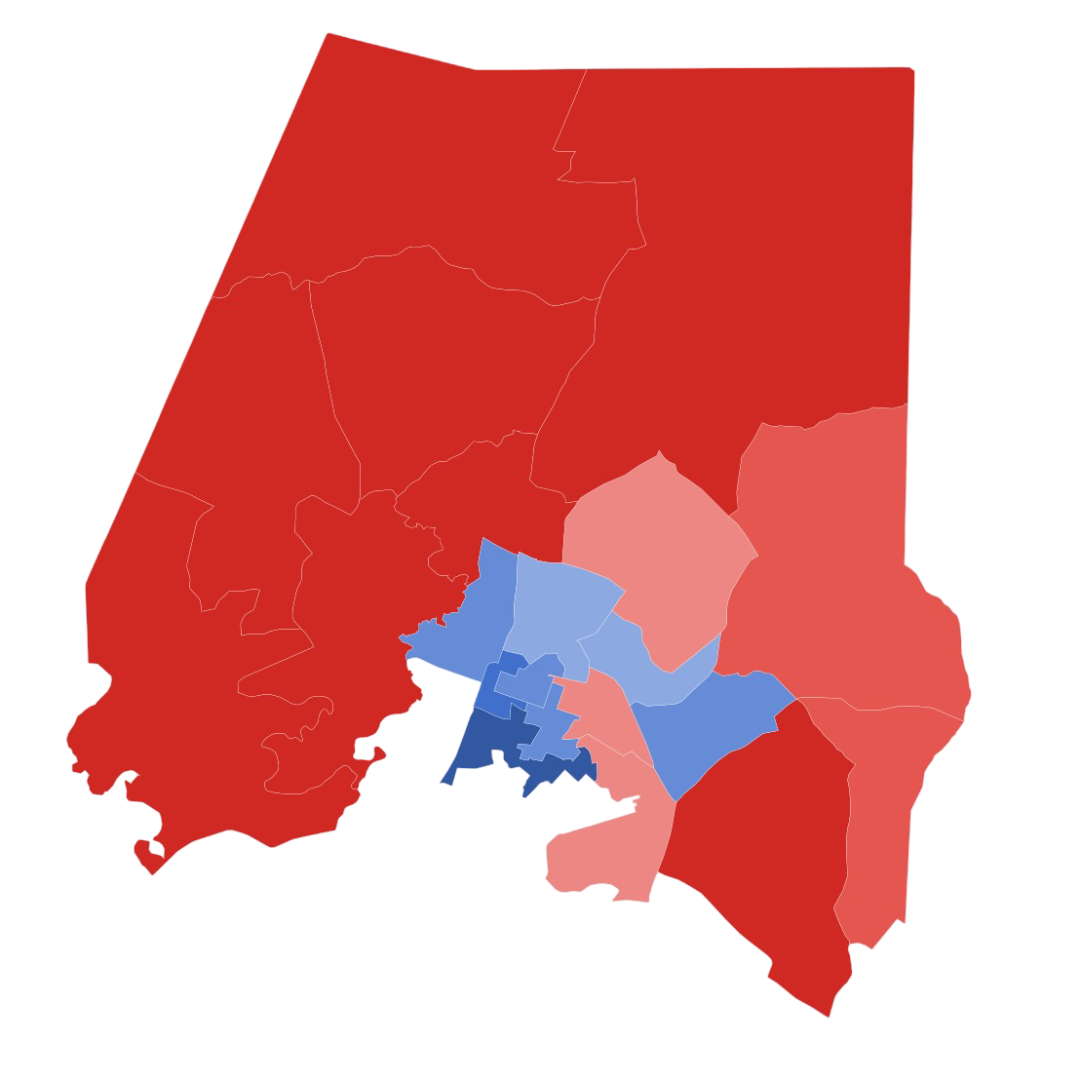
- Bell: 50–60% 60–70% 70–80% Jones: 50–60% 60–70% 70-80% 80-90%
State Representative before election
John Bell
Republican
Elected State Representative
John Bell
Republican

The new 10th district includes portions of northern Wayne County. It includes the home of incumbent Republican Majority Leader John Bell, who has represented the 10th district since 2013.

North Carolina House of Representatives 10th district general election, 2024
Party	Candidate	Votes	%
Republican	John Bell (incumbent)	24,475	60.79%
Democratic	Beatrice Jones	15,789	39.21%
Total votes		40,264	100%
Republican hold			

==== District 11 ====
2024 North Carolina's 11th House district election
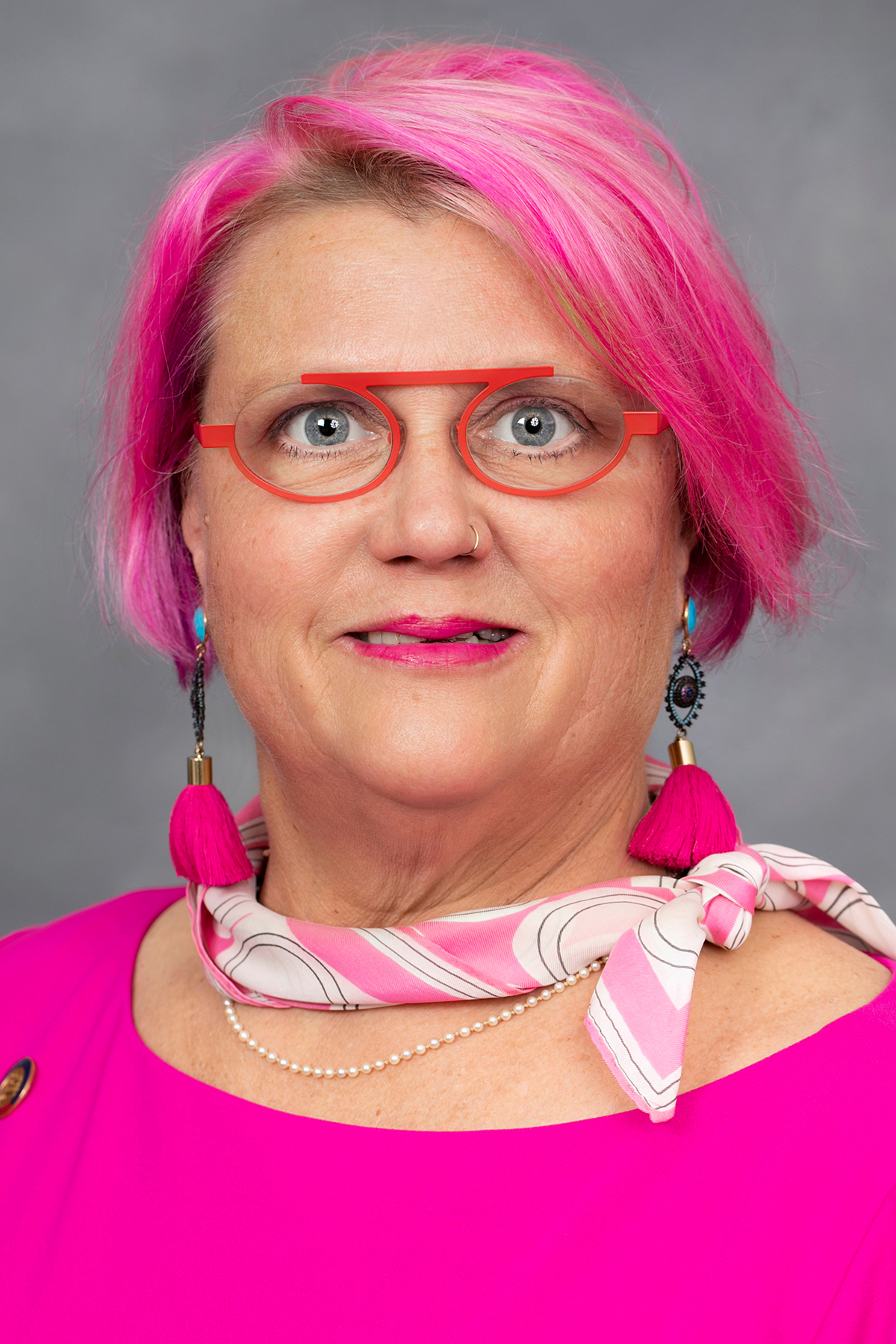

Nominee	Allison Dahle	Philip Hensley
Party	Democratic	Republican
Popular vote	31,688	15,910
Percentage	64.65%	32.46%
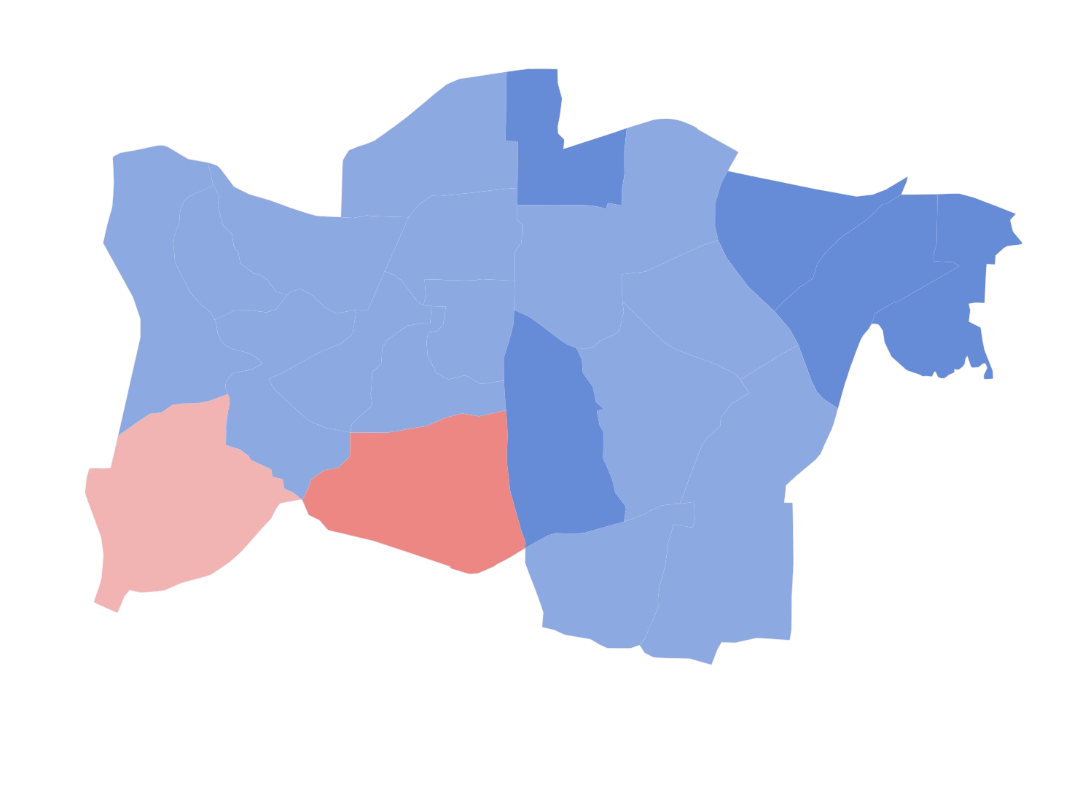
- Dahle: 50–60% 60–70% Hensley: 40-50% 50–60%
State Representative before election
Allison Dahle
Democratic
Elected State Representative
Allison Dahle
Democratic

The new 11th district includes portions of central Wake County. It includes the home of incumbent Democrat Allison Dahle, who has represented the 11th district since 2019.

North Carolina House of Representatives 11th district general election, 2024
Party	Candidate	Votes	%
Democratic	Allison Dahle (incumbent)	31,688	64.65%
Republican	Philip Hensley	15,910	32.46%
Libertarian	Matthew Kordon	1,416	2.89%
Total votes		49,014	100%
Democratic hold			

==== District 12 ====
2024 North Carolina's 12th House district election
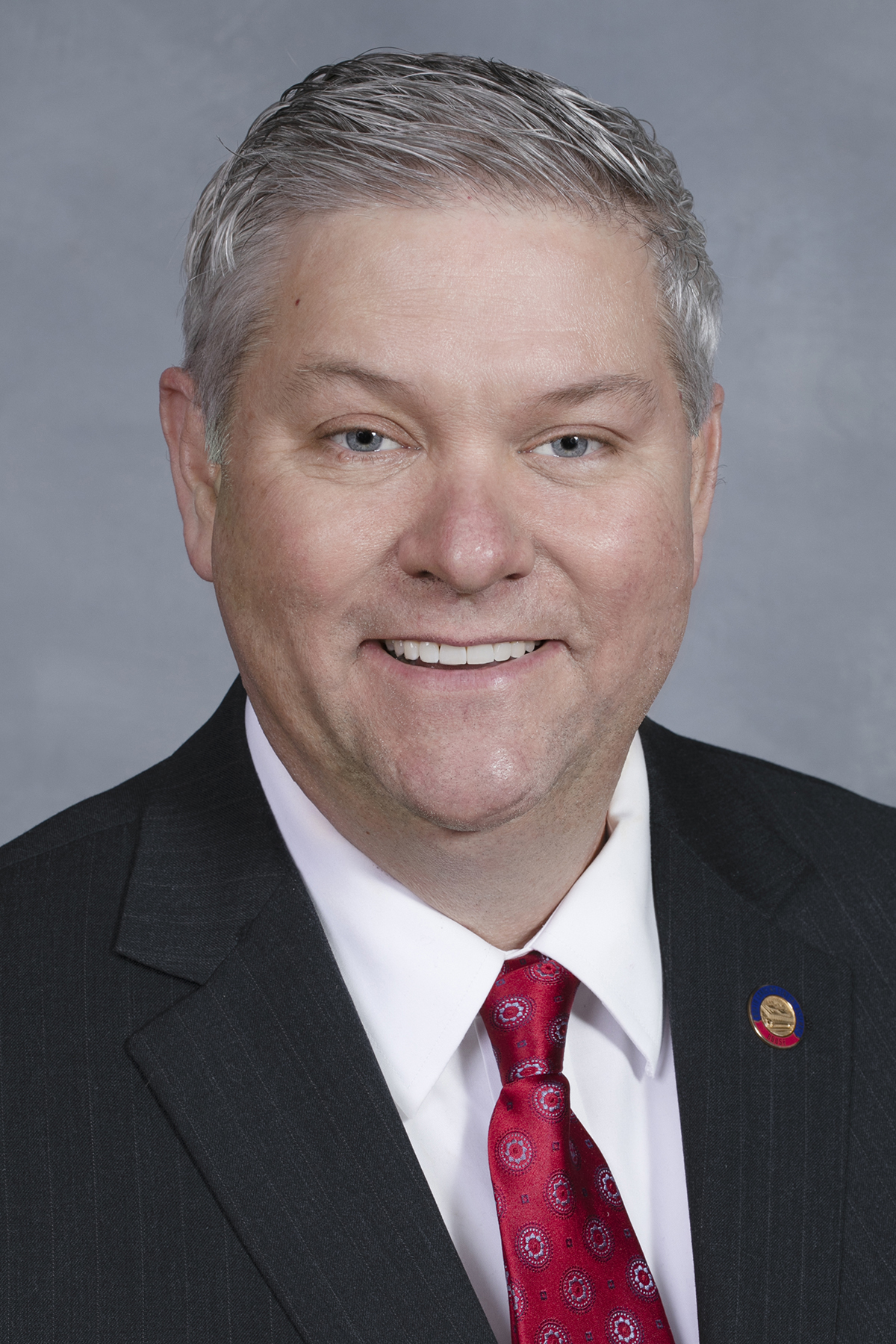

Nominee	Chris Humphrey	Lillie Williams
Party	Republican	Democratic
Popular vote	23,116	16,696
Percentage	57.28%	41.37%
State Representative before election
Chris Humphrey
Republican
Elected State Representative
Chris Humphrey
Republican

The new 12th district includes all of Greene, Jones, and Lenoir counties. It includes the home of incumbent Republican Chris Humphrey, who has represented the 12th district since 2019.

North Carolina House of Representatives 12th district general election, 2024
Party	Candidate	Votes	%
Republican	Chris Humphrey (incumbent)	23,116	57.28%
Democratic	Lillie Williams	16,696	41.37%
Green	Adrien Meadows	546	1.35%
Total votes		40,358	100%
Republican hold			

==== District 13 ====
2024 North Carolina's 13th House district election
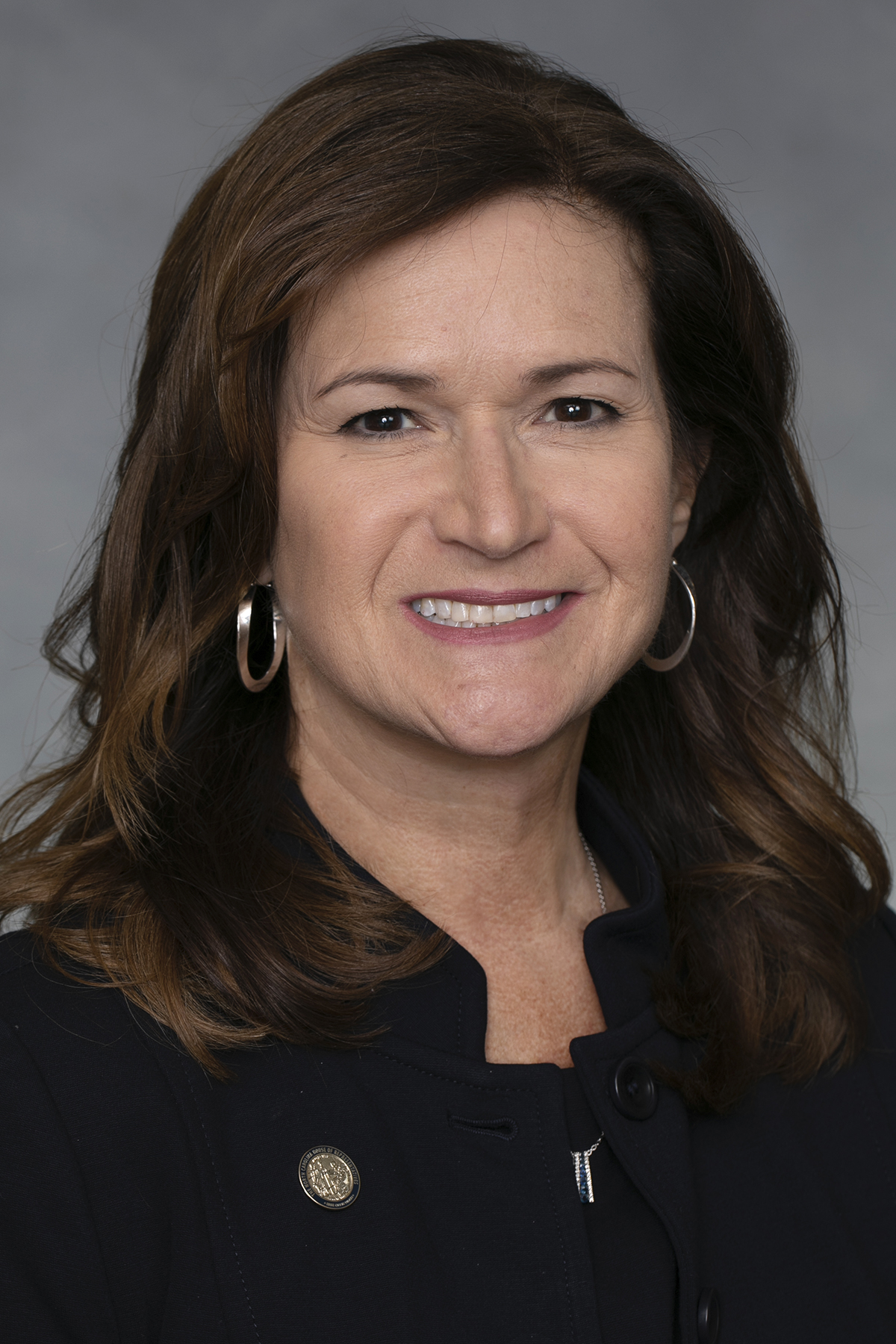

Nominee	Celeste Cairns	Katie Tomberlin
Party	Republican	Democratic
Popular vote	35,181	15,158
Percentage	69.89%	30.11%
State Representative before election
Celeste Cairns
Republican
Elected State Representative
Celeste Cairns
Republican

The new 13th district includes all of Carteret County, as well as a small portion of southeastern Craven County. It includes the home of incumbent Republican Celeste Cairns, who has represented the 13th district since 2023.

North Carolina House of Representatives 13th district Democratic primary election, 2024
Party	Candidate	Votes	%
Democratic	Katie Tomberlin	2,341	62.24%
Democratic	Melvin Cooper	1,420	37.76%
Total votes		3,761	100%

North Carolina House of Representatives 13th district general election, 2024
Party	Candidate	Votes	%
Republican	Celeste Cairns (incumbent)	35,181	69.89%
Democratic	Katie Tomberlin	15,158	30.11%
Total votes		50,339	100%
Republican hold			

==== District 14 ====
2024 North Carolina's 14th House district election
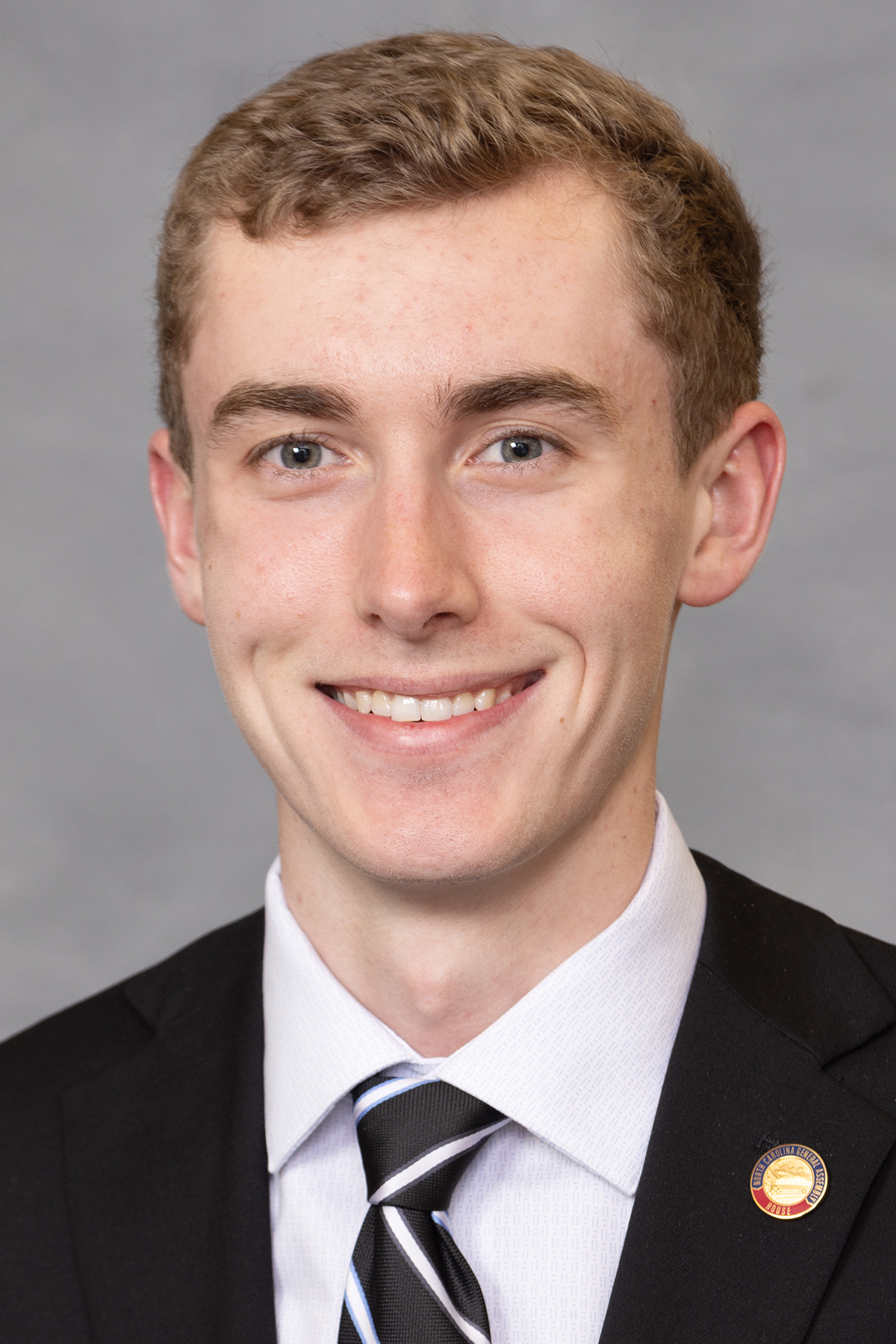

Nominee	Wyatt Gable	Carmen Spicer
Party	Republican	Democratic
Popular vote	16,859	8,639
Percentage	66.12%	33.88%
State Representative before election
George Cleveland
Republican
Elected State Representative
Wyatt Gable
Republican

The new 14th district includes portions of eastern Onslow County. It includes the home of incumbent Republican George Cleveland, who has represented the 14th district since 2005.

North Carolina House of Representatives 14th district Republican primary election, 2024
Party	Candidate	Votes	%
Republican	Wyatt Gable	2,467	50.98%
Republican	George Cleveland (incumbent)	2,372	49.02%
Total votes		4,839	100%

North Carolina House of Representatives 14th district general election, 2024
Party	Candidate	Votes	%
Republican	Wyatt Gable	16,859	66.12%
Democratic	Carmen Spicer	8,639	33.88%
Total votes		25,498	100%
Republican hold			

==== District 15 ====
2024 North Carolina's 15th House district election
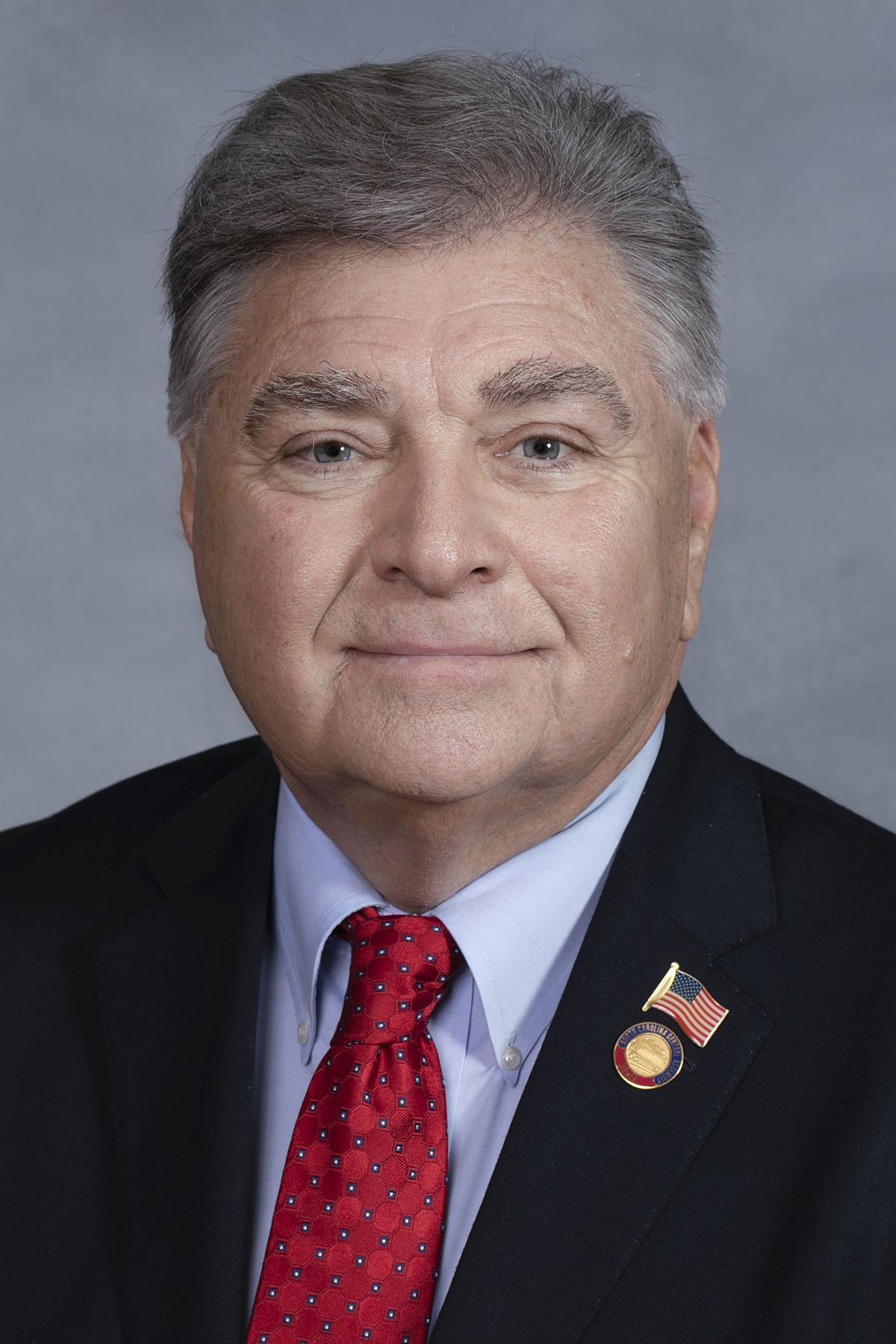

Nominee	Phil Shepard	Christopher Schulte
Party	Republican	Democratic
Popular vote	24,184	11,799
Percentage	63.85%	31.15%
State Representative before election
Phil Shepard
Republican
Elected State Representative
Phil Shepard
Republican

The new 15th district includes portions of northern Onslow County. It includes the home of incumbent Republican Phil Shepard, who has represented the 15th district since 2011.

North Carolina House of Representatives 15th district general election, 2024
Party	Candidate	Votes	%
Republican	Phil Shepard (incumbent)	24,184	63.85%
Democratic	Christopher Schulte	11,799	31.15%
Libertarian	Matthew Feehan	1,894	5.00%
Total votes		37,877	100%
Republican hold			

==== District 16 ====
2024 North Carolina's 16th House district election
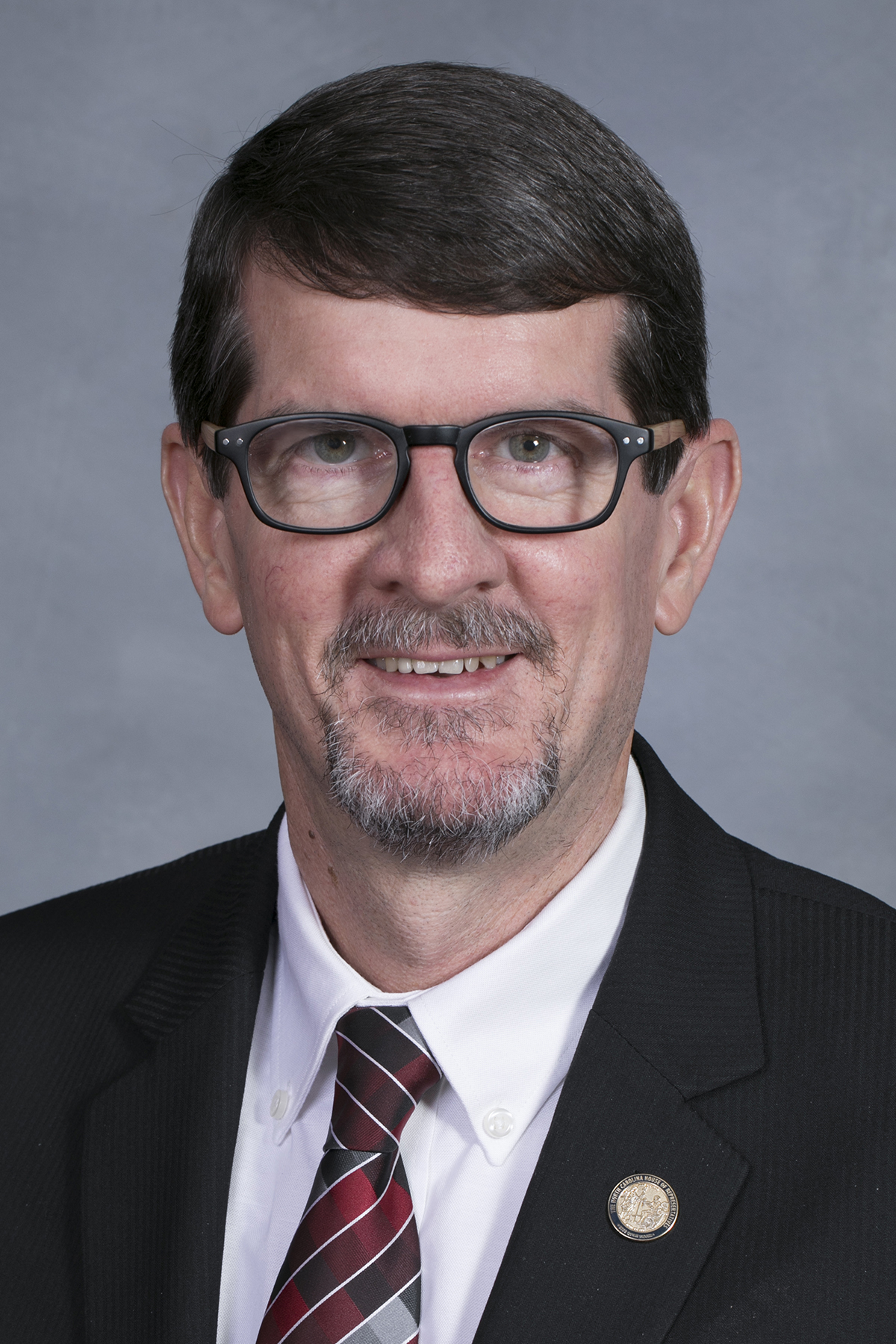

Nominee	Carson Smith	Frances Lakey
Party	Republican	Democratic
Popular vote	36,170	14,892
Percentage	70.84%	29.16%
State Representative before election
Carson Smith
Republican
Elected State Representative
Carson Smith
Republican

The new 16th district includes all of Pender County, as well as portions of western Onslow County. It includes the home of incumbent Republican Carson Smith, who has represented the 16th district since 2019.

North Carolina House of Representatives 16th district general election, 2024
Party	Candidate	Votes	%
Republican	Carson Smith (incumbent)	36,170	70.84%
Democratic	Frances Lakey	14,892	29.16%
Total votes		51,062	100%
Republican hold			

==== District 17 ====
2024 North Carolina's 17th House district election
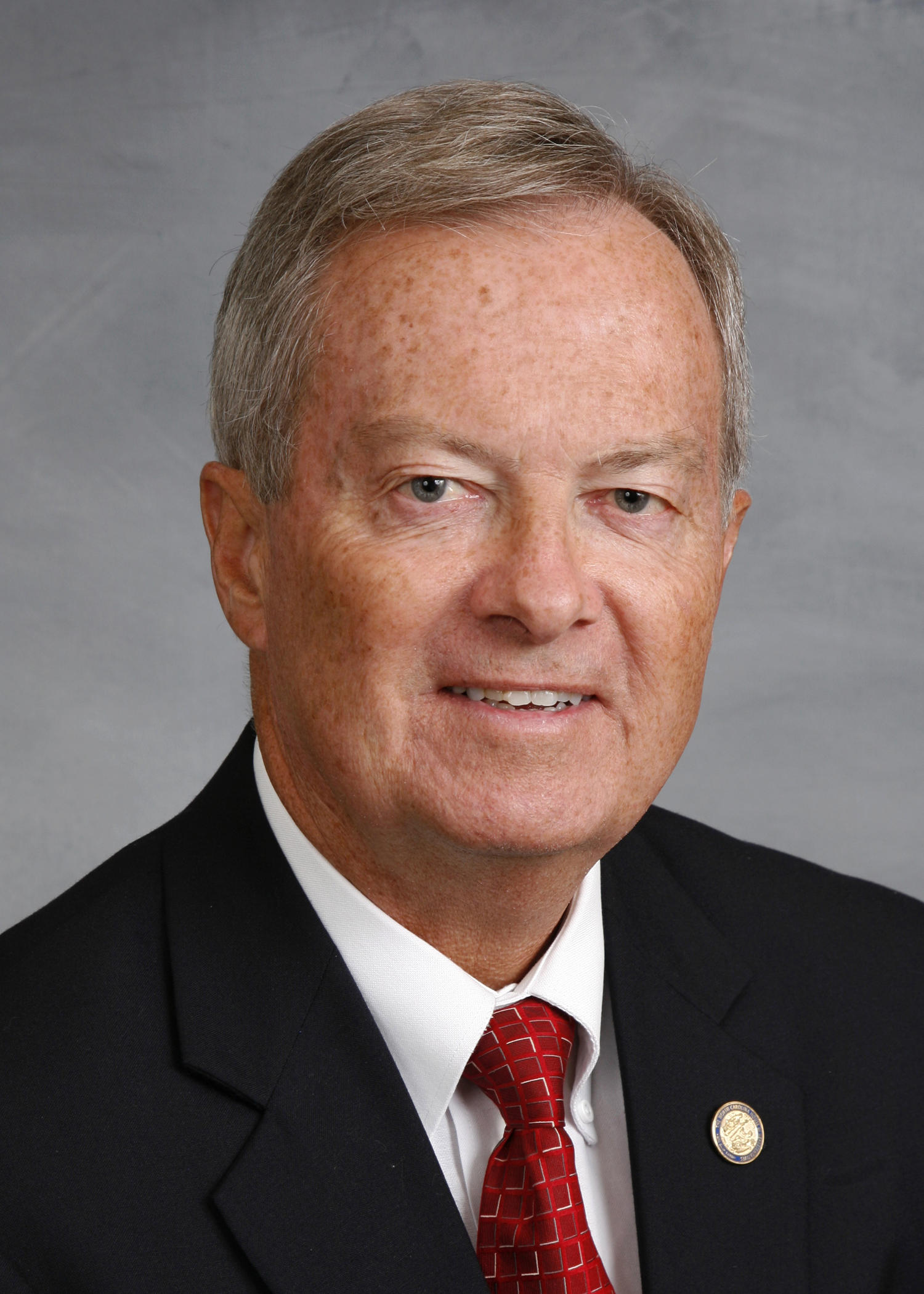

Nominee	Frank Iler	Charles Jones
Party	Republican	Democratic
Popular vote	42,078	25,491
Percentage	62.27%	37.73%
State Representative before election
Frank Iler
Republican
Elected State Representative
Frank Iler
Republican

The new 17th district includes portions of Brunswick County. It includes the home of incumbent Republican Frank Iler, who has represented the 17th district since 2009.

North Carolina House of Representatives 17th district general election, 2024
Party	Candidate	Votes	%
Republican	Frank Iler (incumbent)	42,078	62.27%
Democratic	Charles Jones	25,491	37.73%
Total votes		67,569	100%
Republican hold			

==== District 18 ====
2024 North Carolina's 18th House district election
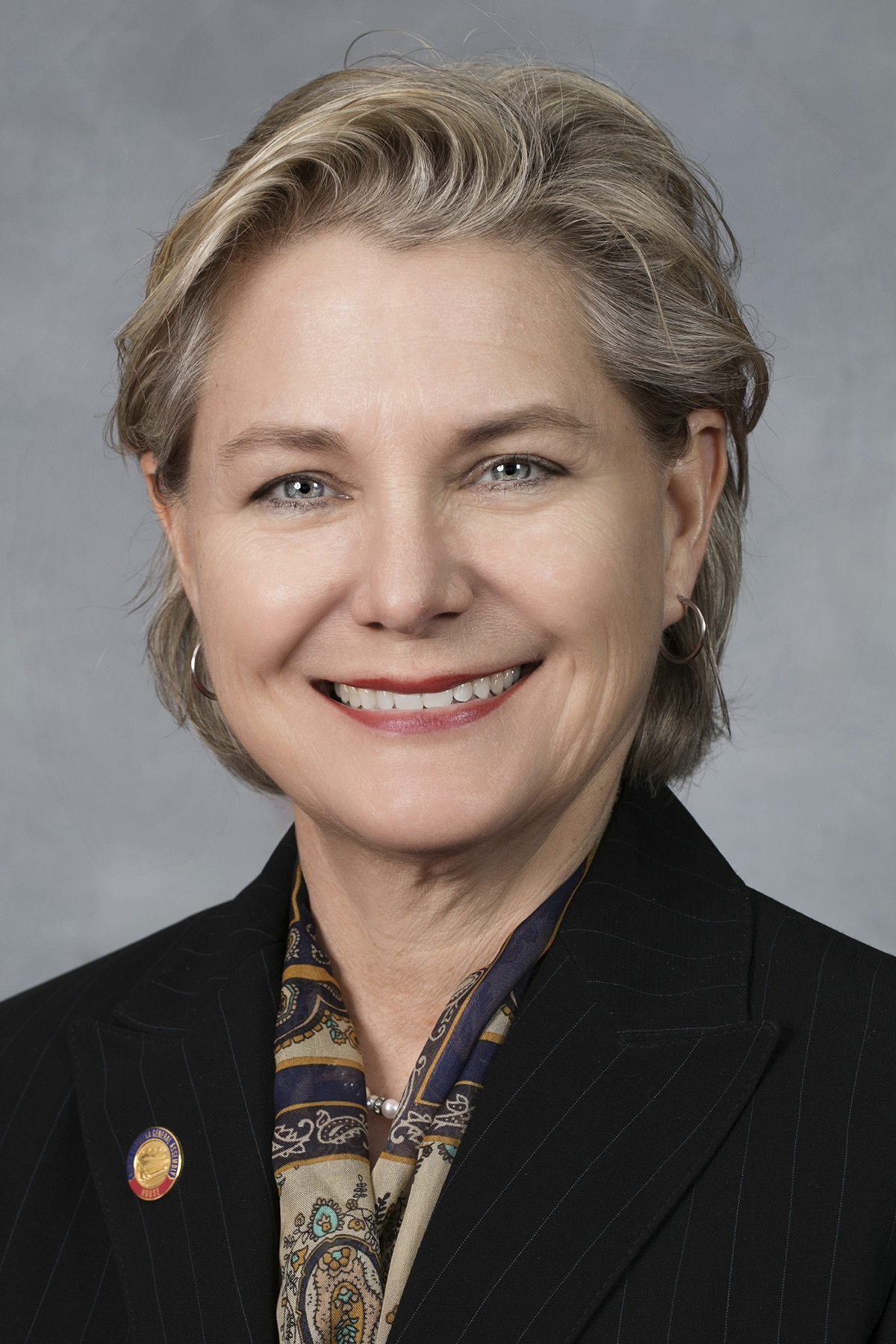

Nominee	Deb Butler	Wallace West (write-in)
Party	Democratic	Independent
Popular vote	33,008	5,967
Percentage	82.66%	14.94%
State Representative before election
Deb Butler
Democratic
Elected State Representative
Deb Butler
Democratic

The new 18th district includes portions of western New Hanover County. It includes the home of incumbent Democrat Deb Butler, who has represented the 18th district since 2017.

North Carolina House of Representatives 18th district general election, 2024
Party	Candidate	Votes	%
Democratic	Deb Butler (incumbent)	33,008	82.66%
Independent	Wallace West (write-in)	5,967	14.94%
Write-in		955	2.39%
Total votes		39,930	100%
Democratic hold			

==== District 19 ====
2024 North Carolina's 19th House district election
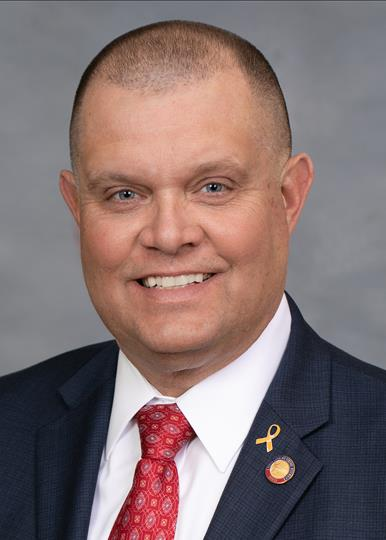

Nominee	Charlie Miller	Jill Brown
Party	Republican	Democratic
Popular vote	41,266	25,882
Percentage	61.46%	38.54%
State Representative before election
Charlie Miller
Republican
Elected State Representative
Charlie Miller
Republican

The new 19th district includes portions of southern Brunswick and New Hanover counties. It includes the home of incumbent Republican Charlie Miller, who has represented the 19th district since 2021.

North Carolina House of Representatives 19th district general election, 2024
Party	Candidate	Votes	%
Republican	Charlie Miller (incumbent)	41,266	61.46%
Democratic	Jill Brown	25,882	38.54%
Total votes		67,148	100%
Republican hold			

=== Districts 20-39 ===
==== District 20 ====
2024 North Carolina's 20th House district election
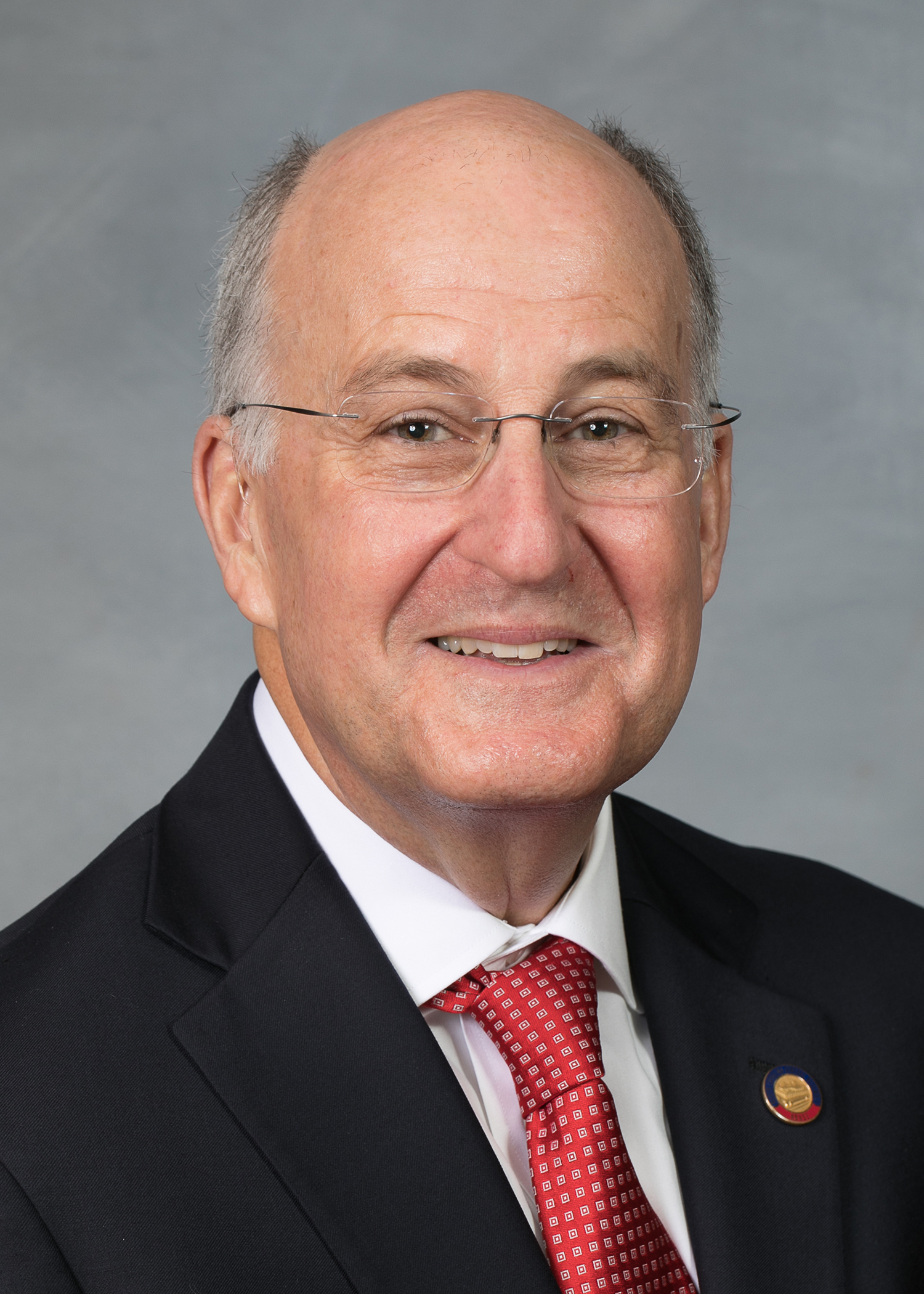

Nominee	Ted Davis Jr.	Jonathan Berger
Party	Republican	Democratic
Popular vote	31,964	25,319
Percentage	55.80%	44.20%
State Representative before election
Ted Davis Jr.
Republican
Elected State Representative
Ted Davis Jr.
Republican

The new 20th district includes portions of northern New Hanover County. It includes the home of incumbent Republican Ted Davis Jr., who has represented the 20th district and its predecessors since 2012.

North Carolina House of Representatives 20th district general election, 2024
Party	Candidate	Votes	%
Republican	Ted Davis Jr. (incumbent)	31,964	55.80%
Democratic	Jonathan Berger	25,319	44.20%
Total votes		57,283	100%
Republican hold			

==== District 21 ====
2024 North Carolina's 21st House district election
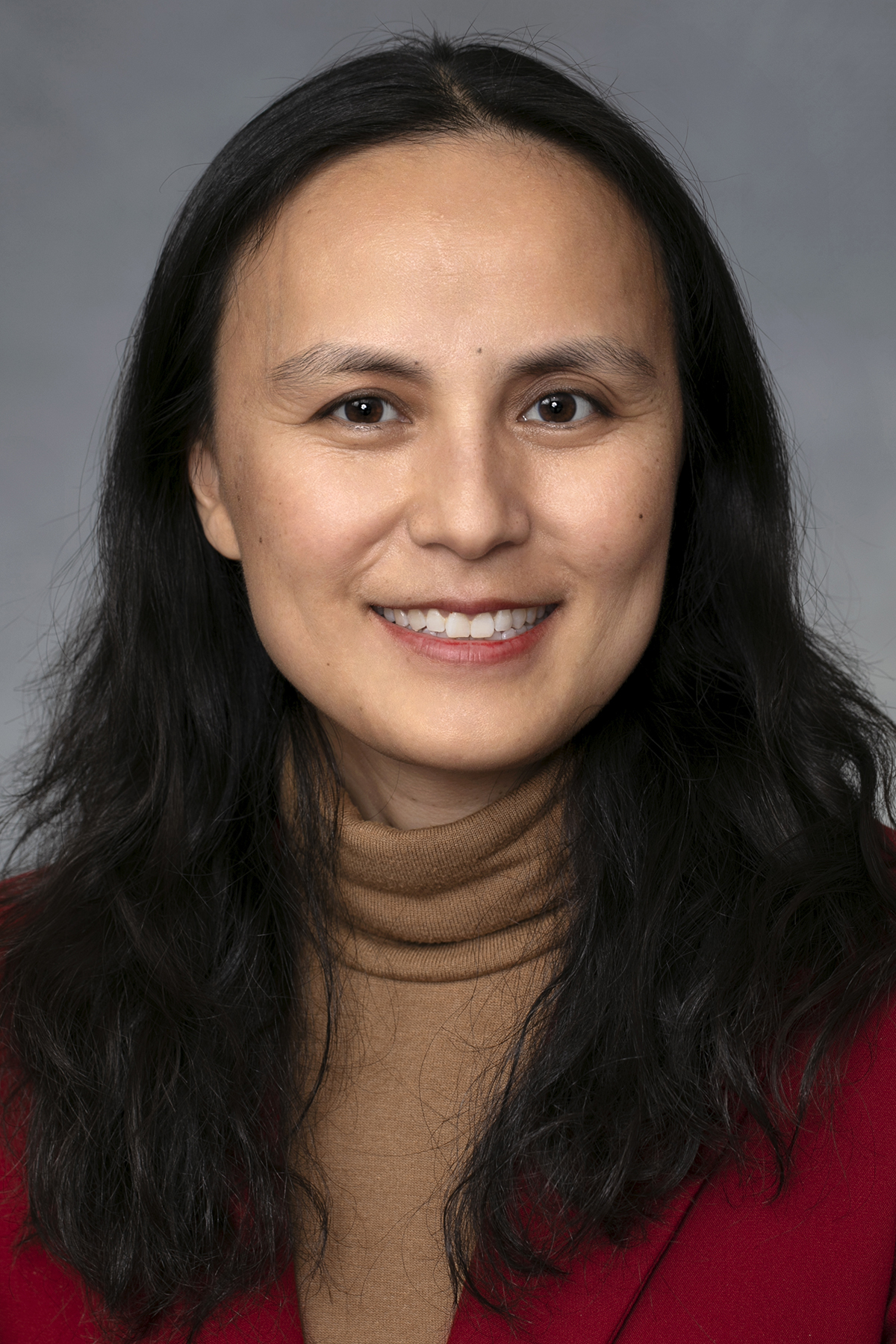

Nominee	Ya Liu	Mary Miskimon
Party	Democratic	Republican
Popular vote	30,580	18,153
Percentage	62.75%	37.25%
State Representative before election
Ya Liu
Democratic
Elected State Representative
Ya Liu
Democratic

The new 21st district includes portions of southwestern Wake County. It includes the home of incumbent Democrat Ya Liu, who has represented the 21st district since 2023.

North Carolina House of Representatives 21st district general election, 2024
Party	Candidate	Votes	%
Democratic	Ya Liu (incumbent)	30,580	62.75%
Republican	Mary Miskimon	18,153	37.25%
Total votes		48,733	100%
Democratic hold			

==== District 22 ====
2024 North Carolina's 22nd House district election
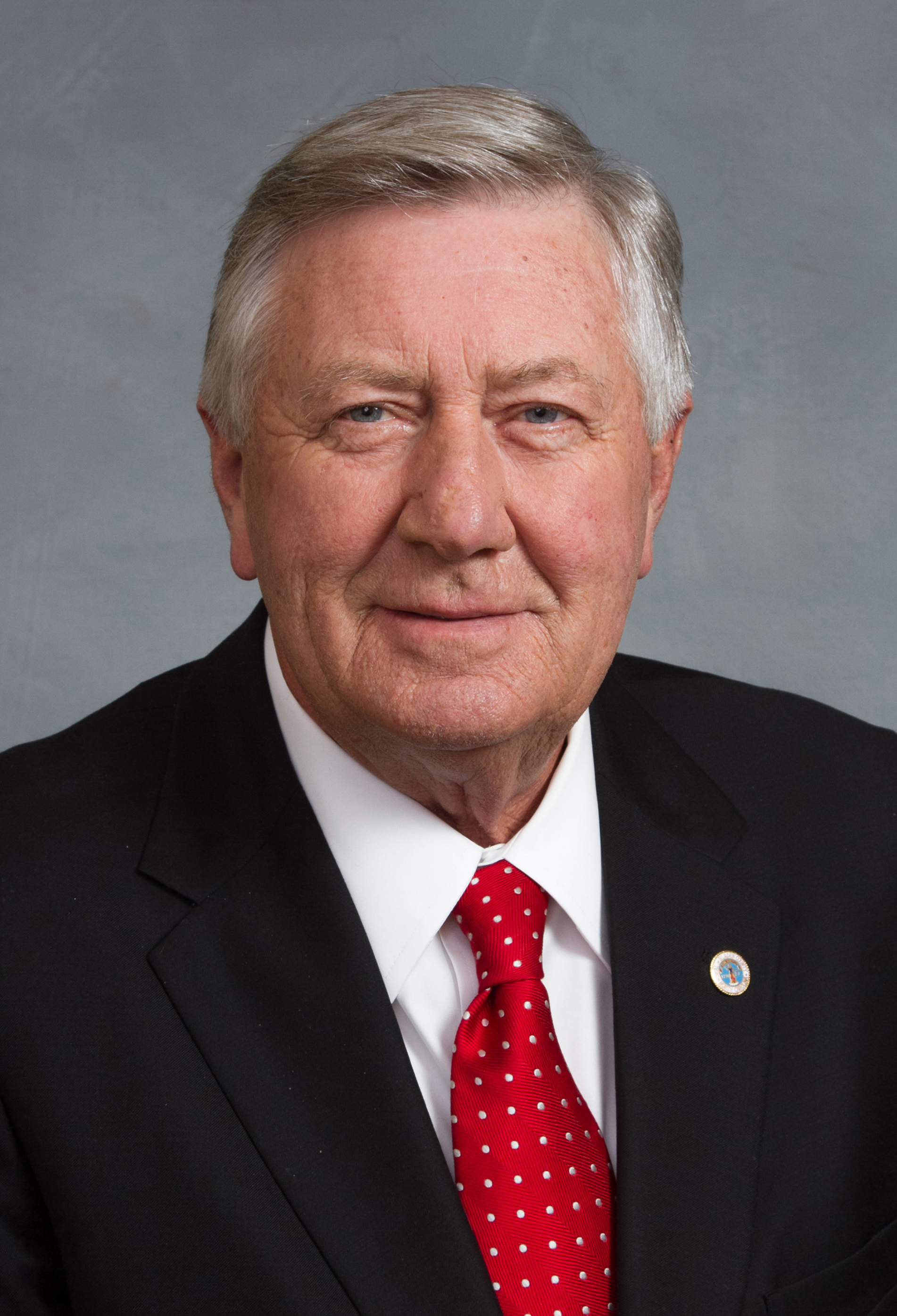

Nominee	William Brisson	Joshua Harrell
Party	Republican	Democratic
Popular vote	26,176	16,729
Percentage	61.01%	38.99%
State Representative before election
William Brisson
Republican
Elected State Representative
William Brisson
Republican

The new 22nd district includes all of Bladen and Sampson counties. It includes the home of incumbent Republican William Brisson, who has represented the 22nd district since 2007.

North Carolina House of Representatives 22nd district general election, 2024
Party	Candidate	Votes	%
Republican	William Brisson (incumbent)	26,176	61.01%
Democratic	Joshua Harrell	16,729	38.99%
Total votes		42,905	100%
Republican hold			

==== District 23 ====
2024 North Carolina's 23rd House district election
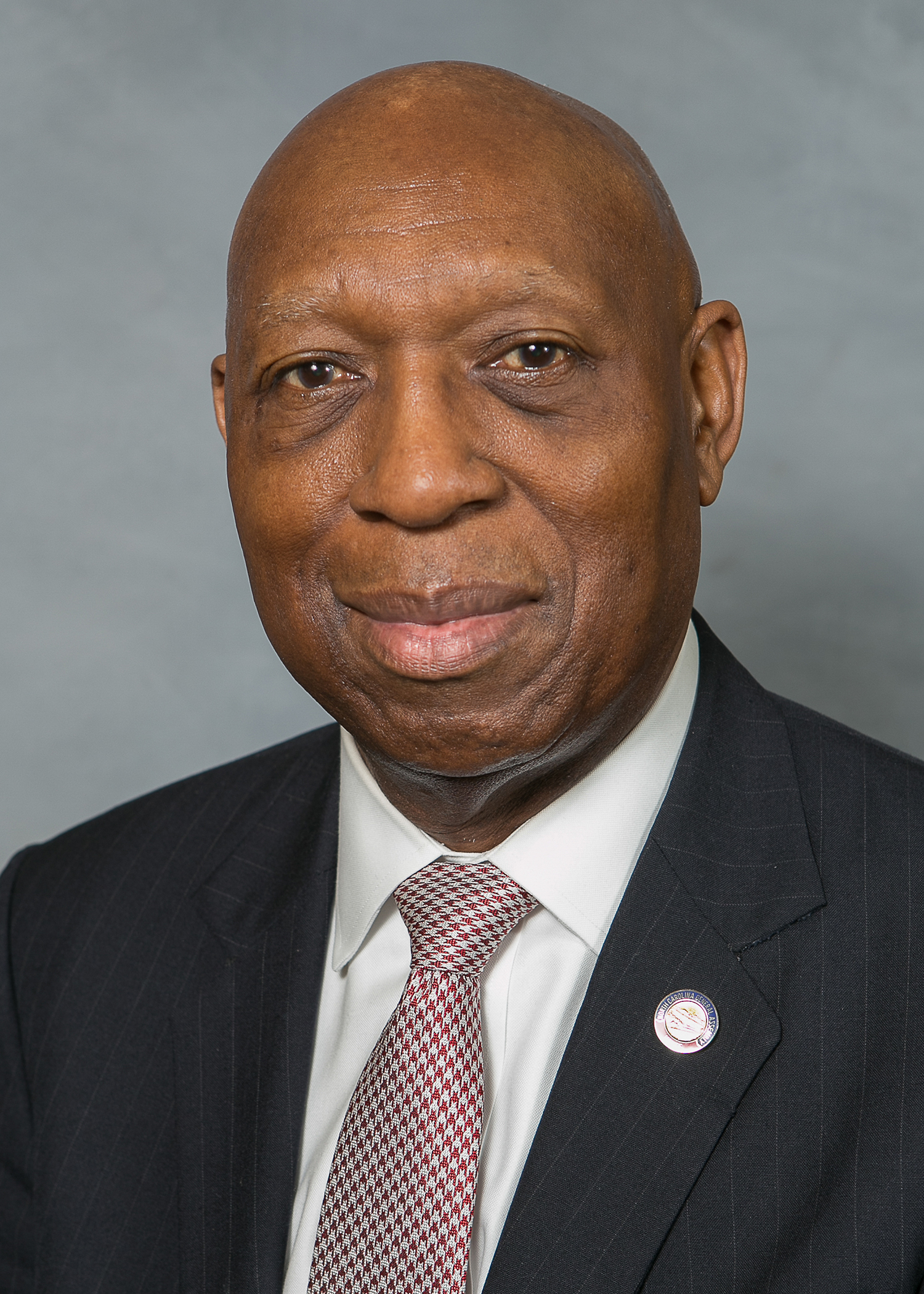

Nominee	Shelly Willingham	Brent Roberson
Party	Democratic	Republican
Popular vote	25,140	19,390
Percentage	56.46%	43.54%
State Representative before election
Shelly Willingham
Democratic
Elected State Representative
Shelly Willingham
Democratic

The new 23rd district includes all of Bertie, Edgecombe, and Martin counties. It includes the home of incumbent Democrat Shelly Willingham, who has represented the 23rd district since 2015.

North Carolina House of Representatives 23rd district Democratic primary election, 2024
Party	Candidate	Votes	%
Democratic	Shelly Willingham (incumbent)	6,769	78.85%
Democratic	Abbie Lane	1,816	21.15%
Total votes		8,585	100%

North Carolina House of Representatives 23rd district general election, 2024
Party	Candidate	Votes	%
Democratic	Shelly Willingham (incumbent)	25,140	56.46%
Republican	Brent Roberson	19,390	43.54%
Total votes		44,530	100%
Democratic hold			

==== District 24 ====
2024 North Carolina's 24th House district election
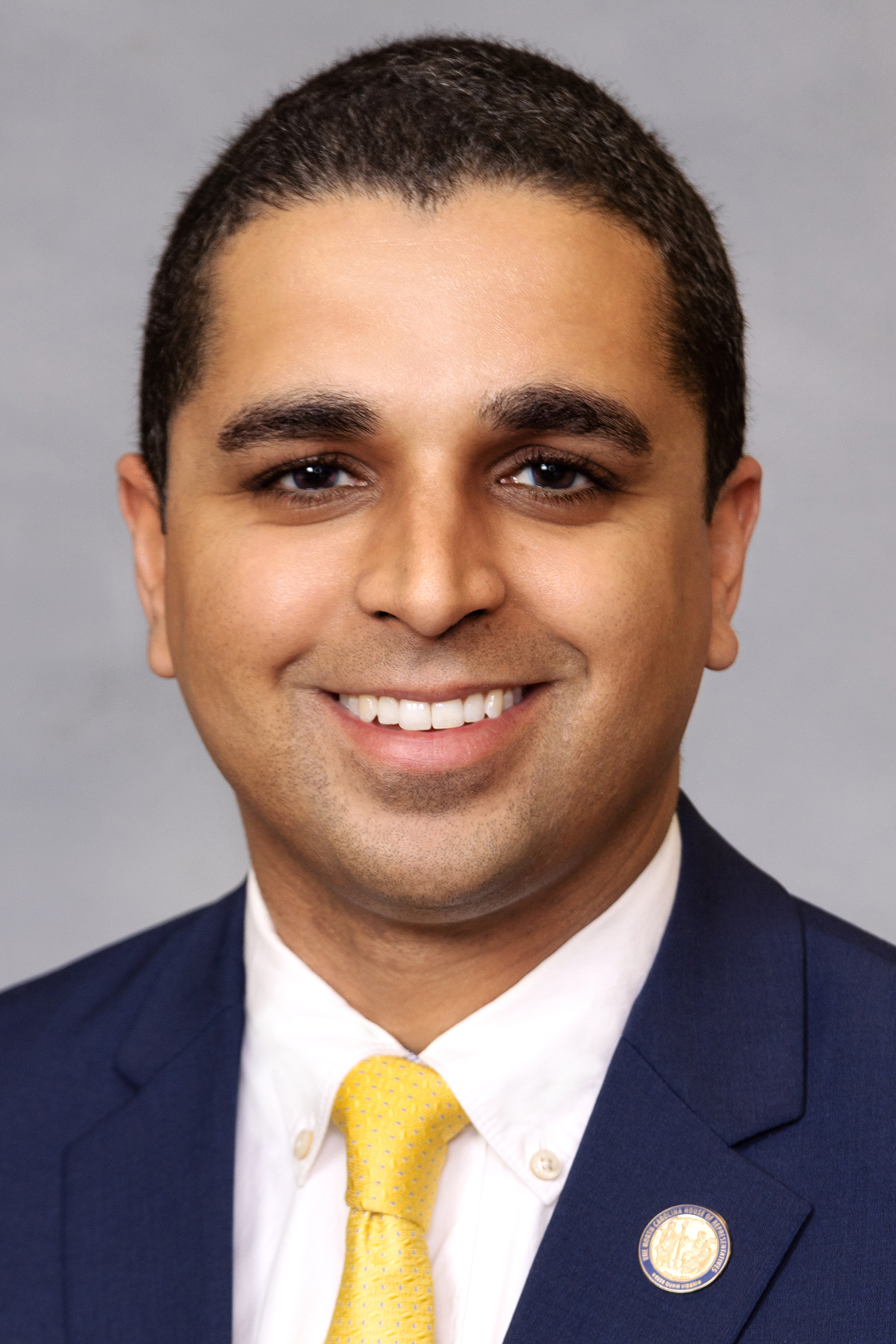

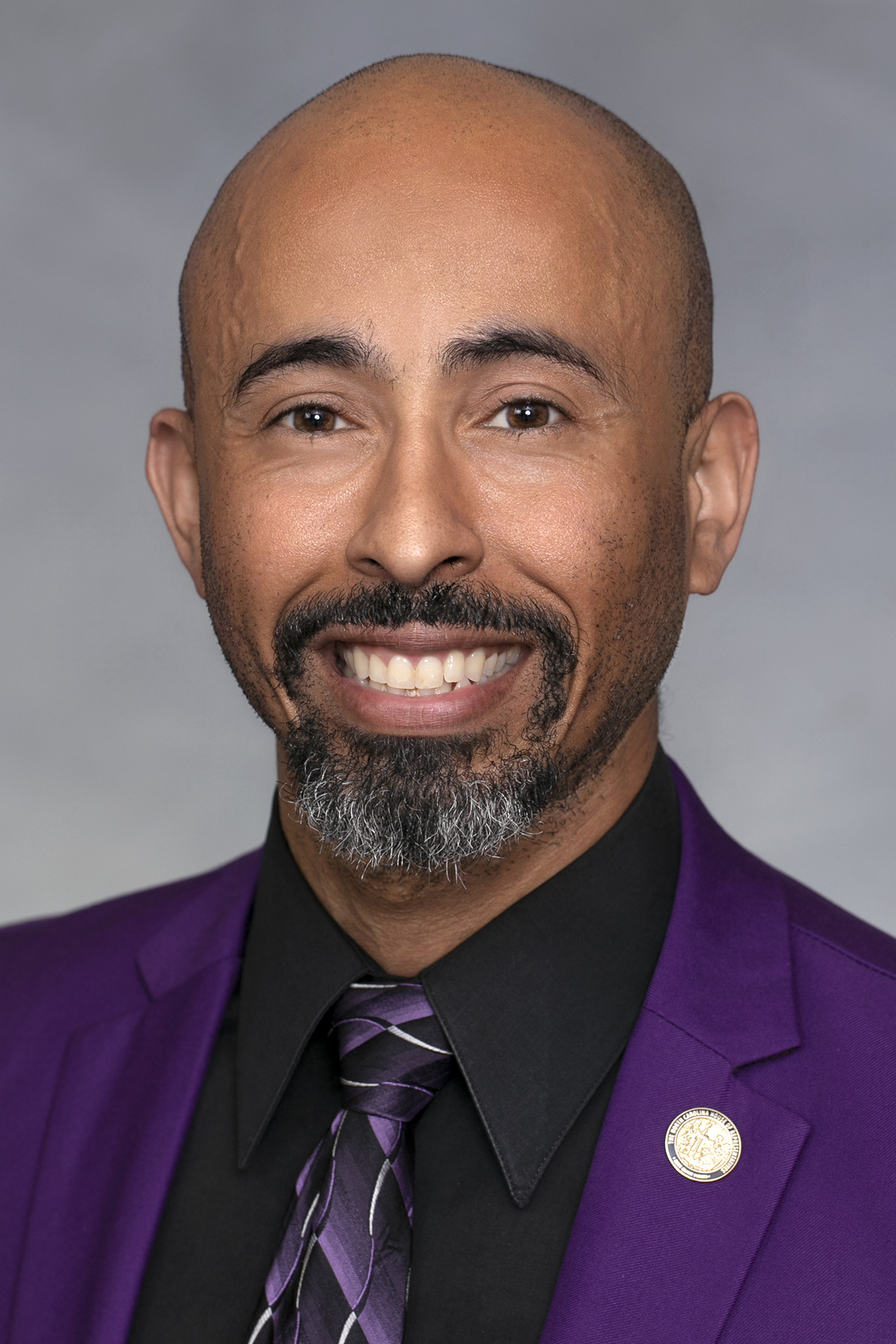
Nominee	Dante Pittman	Ken Fontenot
Party	Democratic	Republican
Popular vote	21,343	20,425
Percentage	51.10%	48.90%
State Representative before election
Ken Fontenot
Republican
Elected State Representative
Dante Pittman
Democratic

The new 24th district includes all of Wilson County, as well as a small portion of Nash County. It includes the home of incumbent Republican Ken Fontenot, who has represented the 24th district since 2023.

North Carolina House of Representatives 24th district general election, 2024
Party	Candidate	Votes	%
Democratic	Dante Pittman	21,343	51.10%
Republican	Ken Fontenot (incumbent)	20,425	48.90%
Total votes		41,768	100%
Democratic gain from Republican			

==== District 25 ====
2024 North Carolina's 25th House district election
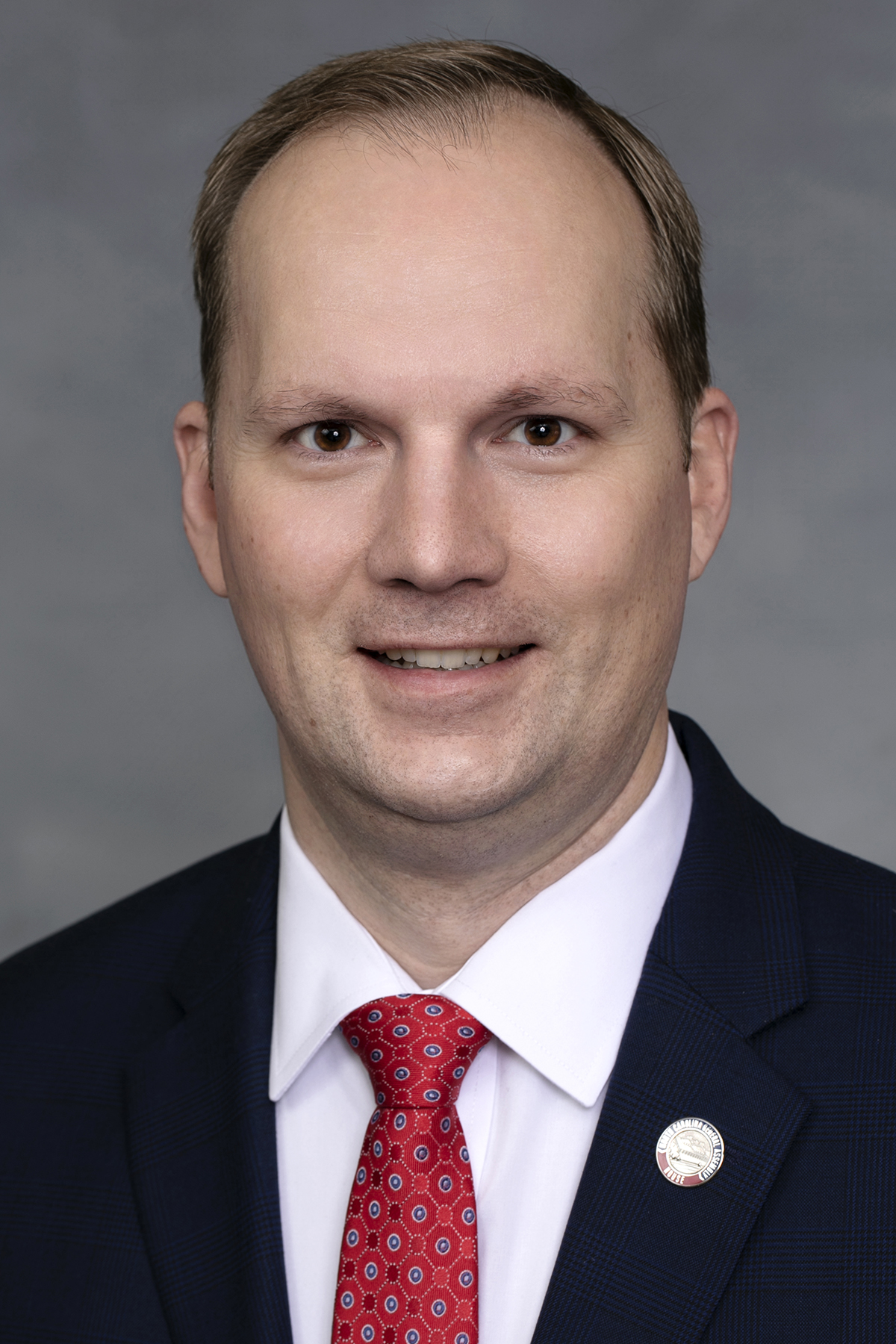

Nominee	Allen Chesser	Lorenza Wilkins
Party	Republican	Democratic
Popular vote	23,868	23,407
Percentage	48.80%	47.86%
State Representative before election
Allen Chesser
Republican
Elected State Representative
Allen Chesser
Republican

The new 25th district includes most of Nash County. It includes the home of incumbent Republican Allen Chesser, who has represented the 25th district since 2023.

North Carolina House of Representatives 25th district Republican primary election, 2024
Party	Candidate	Votes	%
Republican	Allen Chesser (incumbent)	6,415	66.61%
Republican	Yvonne McLeod	3,215	33.39%
Total votes		9,630	100%

North Carolina House of Representatives 25th district general election, 2024
Party	Candidate	Votes	%
Republican	Allen Chesser (incumbent)	23,868	48.80%
Democratic	Lorenza Wilkins	23,407	47.86%
Libertarian	Nick Taylor	1,630	3.33%
Total votes		48,905	100%
Republican hold			

==== District 26 ====
2024 North Carolina's 26th House district election
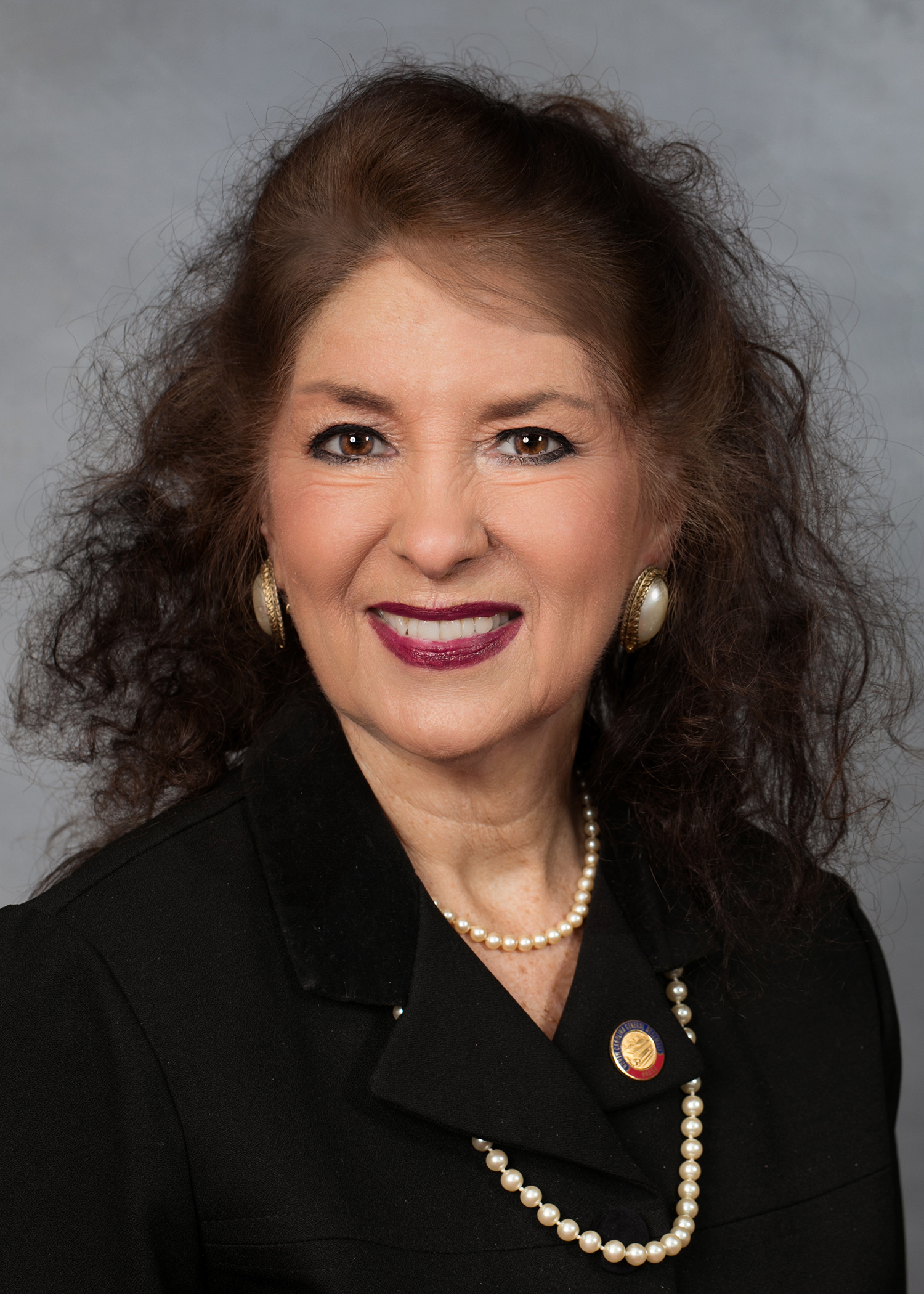

Nominee	Donna McDowell White	Matthew Wood
Party	Republican	Democratic
Popular vote	29,943	22,671
Percentage	55.10%	41.72%
State Representative before election
Donna McDowell White
Republican
Elected State Representative
Donna McDowell White
Republican

The new 26th district includes portions of northern Johnston County. It includes the home of incumbent Republican Donna McDowell White, who has represented the 26th district since 2017.

North Carolina House of Representatives 26th district general election, 2024
Party	Candidate	Votes	%
Republican	Donna McDowell White (incumbent)	29,943	55.10%
Democratic	Matthew Wood	22,671	41.72%
Libertarian	Kevin Terrett	1,732	3.19%
Total votes		54,346	100%
Republican hold			

==== District 27 ====
2024 North Carolina's 27th House district election
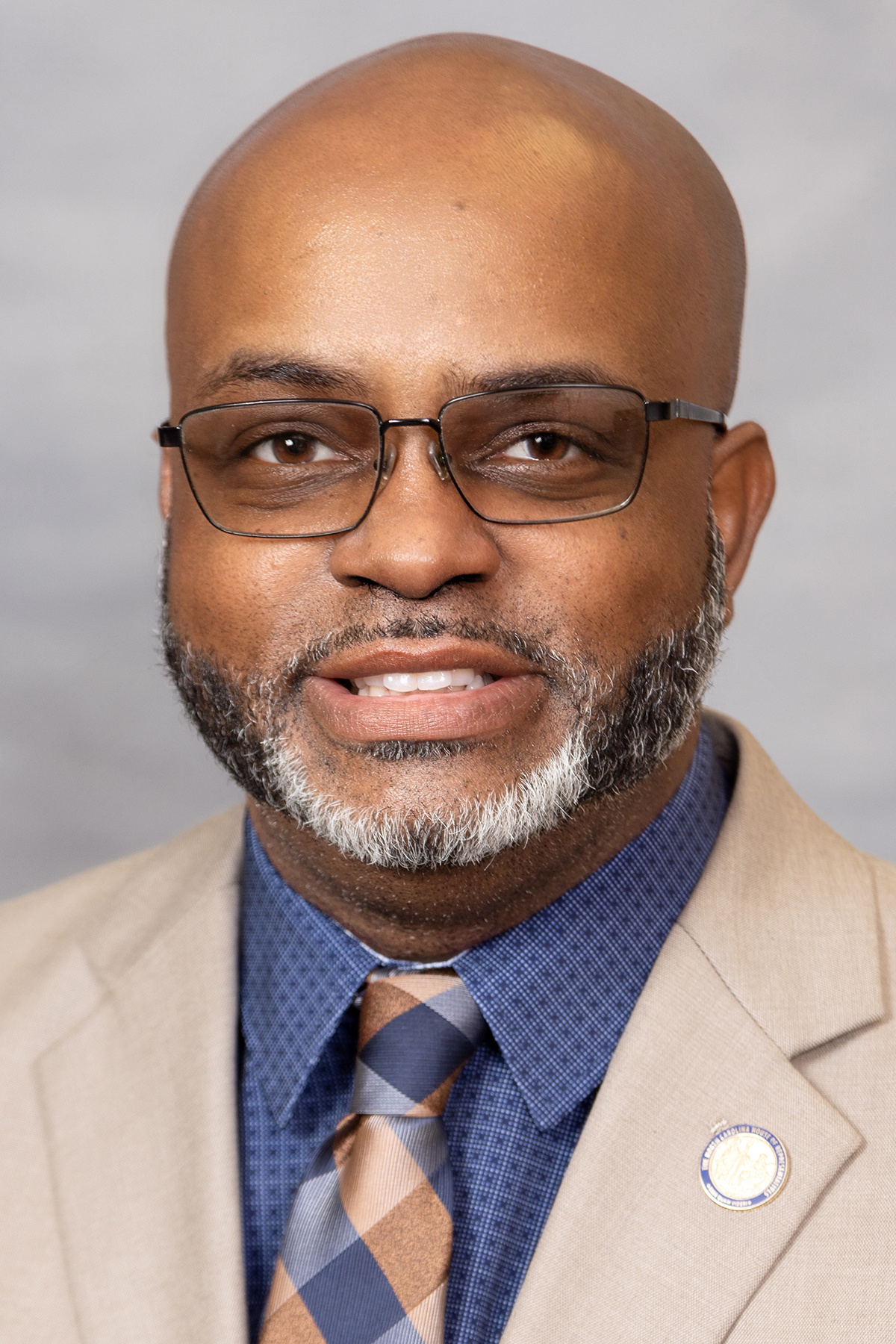
Nominee	Rodney Pierce
Party	Democratic
Popular vote	31,914
Percentage	100%
State Representative before election
Michael Wray
Democratic
Elected State Representative
Rodney Pierce
Democratic

The new 27th district includes all of Halifax, Northampton, and Warren counties. It includes the home of incumbent Democrat Michael Wray, who has represented the 27th district since 2005.

North Carolina House of Representatives 27th district Democratic primary election, 2024
Party	Candidate	Votes	%
Democratic	Rodney Pierce	5,986	50.14%
Democratic	Michael Wray (incumbent)	5,952	49.86%
Total votes		11,938	100%

North Carolina House of Representatives 27th district general election, 2024
Party	Candidate	Votes	%
Democratic	Rodney Pierce	31,914	100%
Total votes		31,914	100%
Democratic hold			

==== District 28 ====
2024 North Carolina's 28th House district election
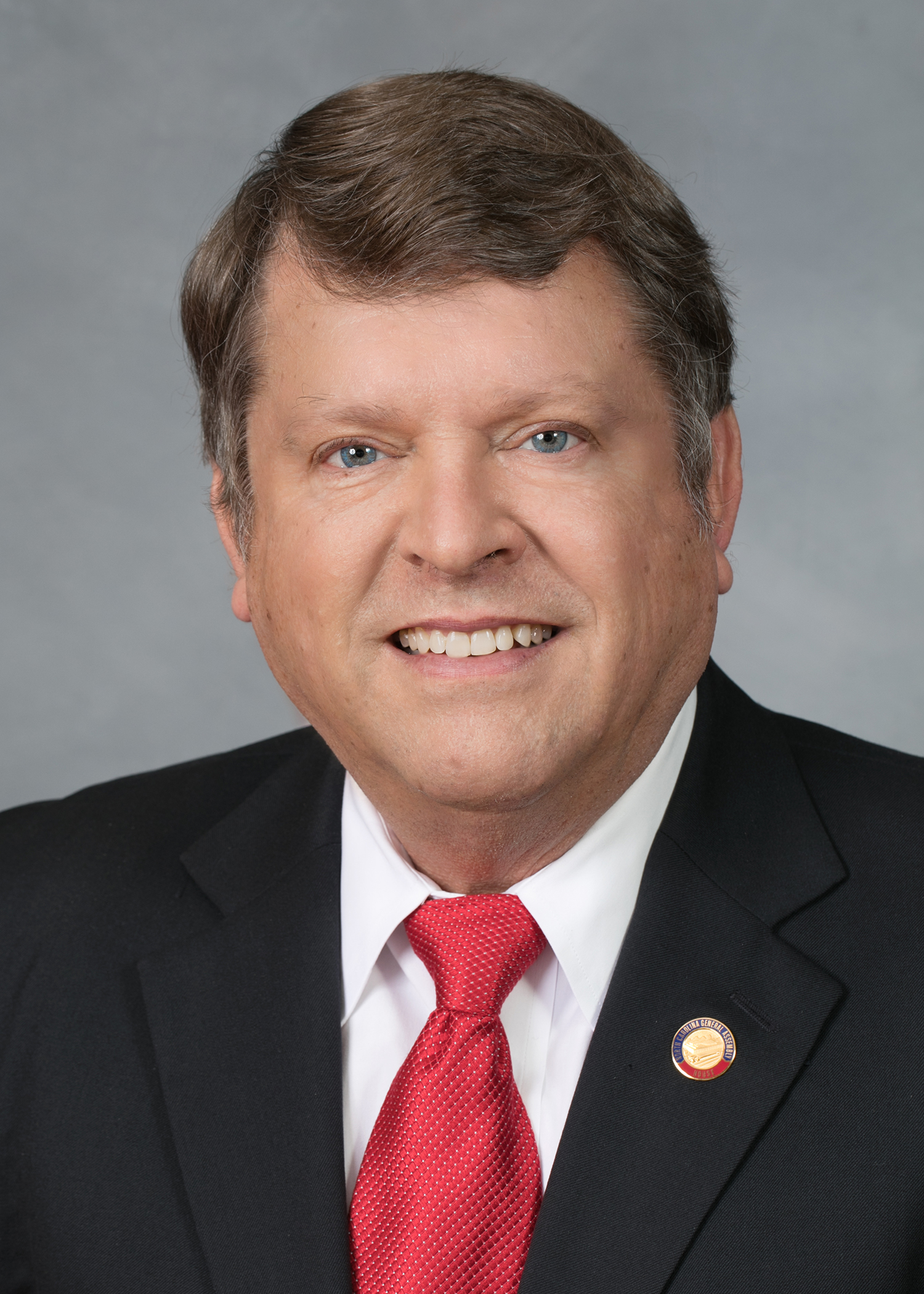

Nominee	Larry Strickland	Tawanda Shepard
Party	Republican	Democratic
Popular vote	28,915	13,065
Percentage	68.88%	31.12%
State Representative before election
Larry Strickland
Republican
Elected State Representative
Larry Strickland
Republican

The new 28th district includes most of Johnston County. It includes the home of incumbent Republican Larry Strickland, who has represented the 28th district since 2017.

North Carolina House of Representatives 28th district Republican primary election, 2024
Party	Candidate	Votes	%
Republican	Larry Strickland (incumbent)	8,877	89.31%
Republican	Elizabeth Anne Temple	1,062	10.69%
Total votes		9,939	100%

North Carolina House of Representatives 28th district general election, 2024
Party	Candidate	Votes	%
Republican	Larry Strickland (incumbent)	28,915	68.88%
Democratic	Tawanda Shepard	13,065	31.12%
Total votes		41,980	100%
Republican hold			

==== District 29 ====
2024 North Carolina's 29th House district election
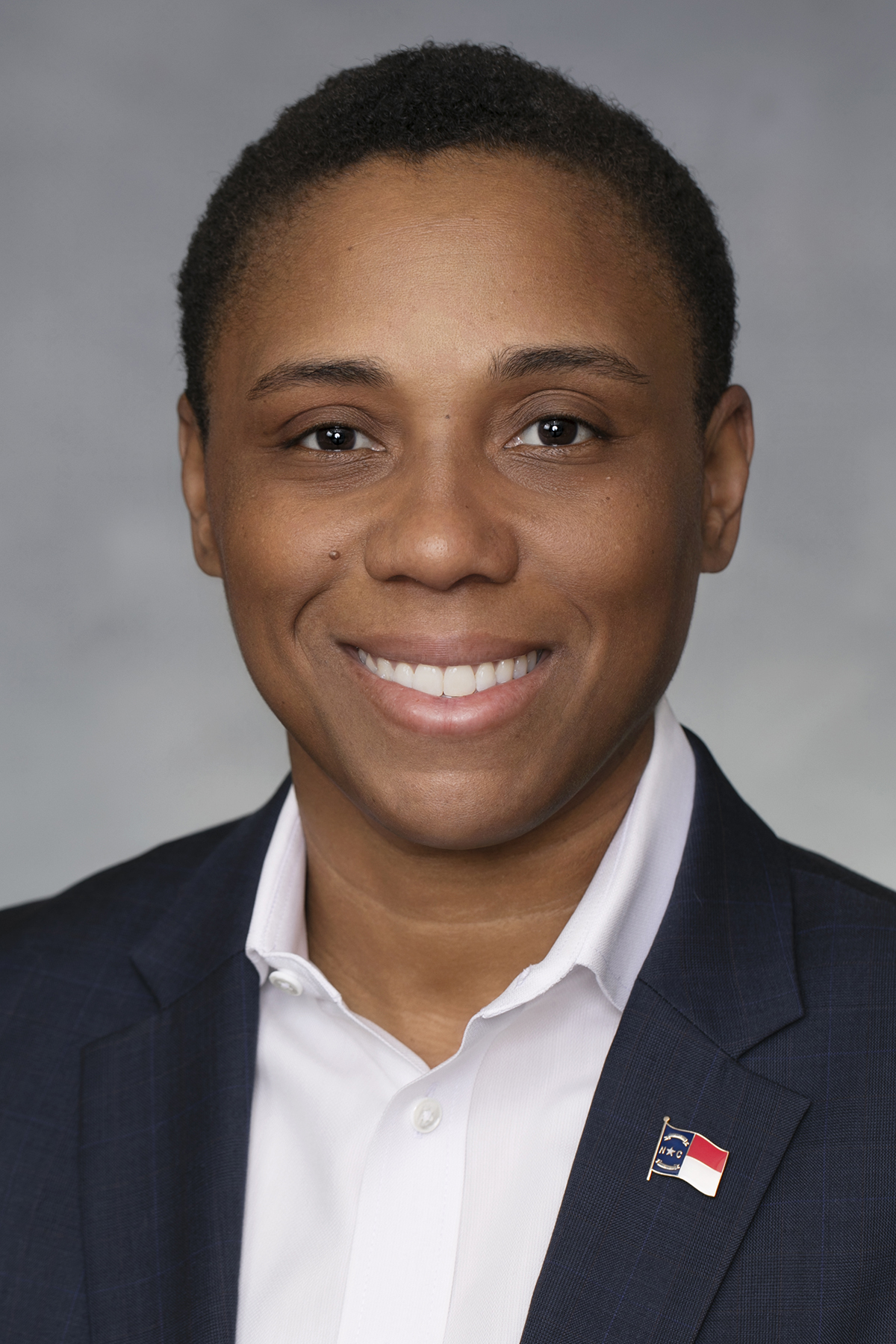
Nominee	Vernetta Alston
Party	Democratic
Popular vote	47,945
Percentage	100%
State Representative before election
Vernetta Alston
Democratic
Elected State Representative
Vernetta Alston
Democratic

The new 29th district includes portions of southwestern Durham County. It includes the home of incumbent Democrat Vernetta Alston, who has represented the 29th district since 2020.

North Carolina House of Representatives 29th district general election, 2024
Party	Candidate	Votes	%
Democratic	Vernetta Alston (incumbent)	47,945	100%
Total votes		47,945	100%
Democratic hold			

==== District 30 ====
2024 North Carolina's 30th House district election
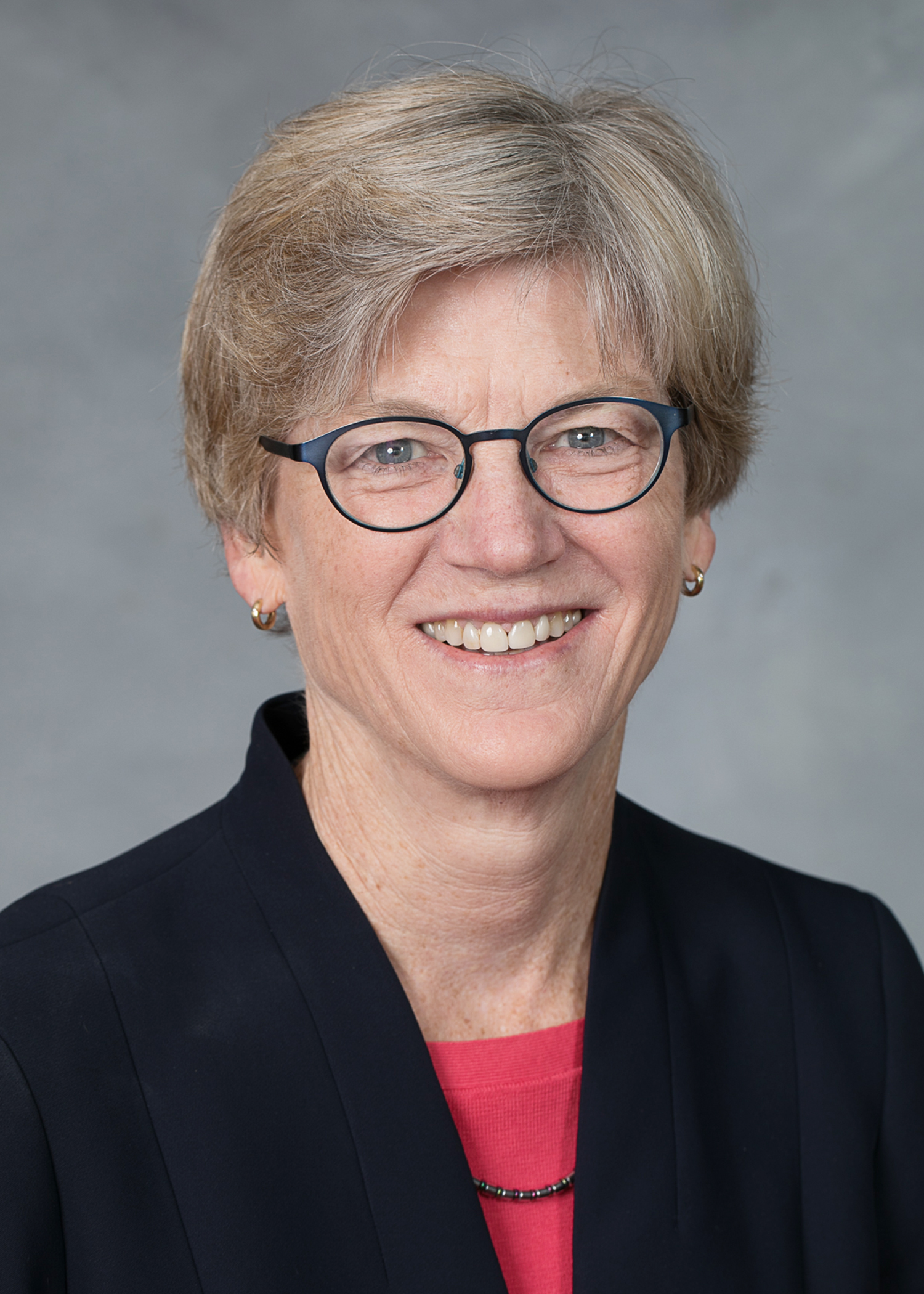
Nominee	Marcia Morey
Party	Democratic
Popular vote	41,916
Percentage	100%
State Representative before election
Marcia Morey
Democratic
Elected State Representative
Marcia Morey
Democratic

The new 30th district includes portions of western Durham County. It includes the home of incumbent Democrat Marcia Morey, who has represented the 30th district since 2017.

North Carolina House of Representatives 30th district general election, 2024
Party	Candidate	Votes	%
Democratic	Marcia Morey (incumbent)	41,916	100%
Total votes		41,916	100%
Democratic hold			

==== District 31 ====
2024 North Carolina's 31st House district election
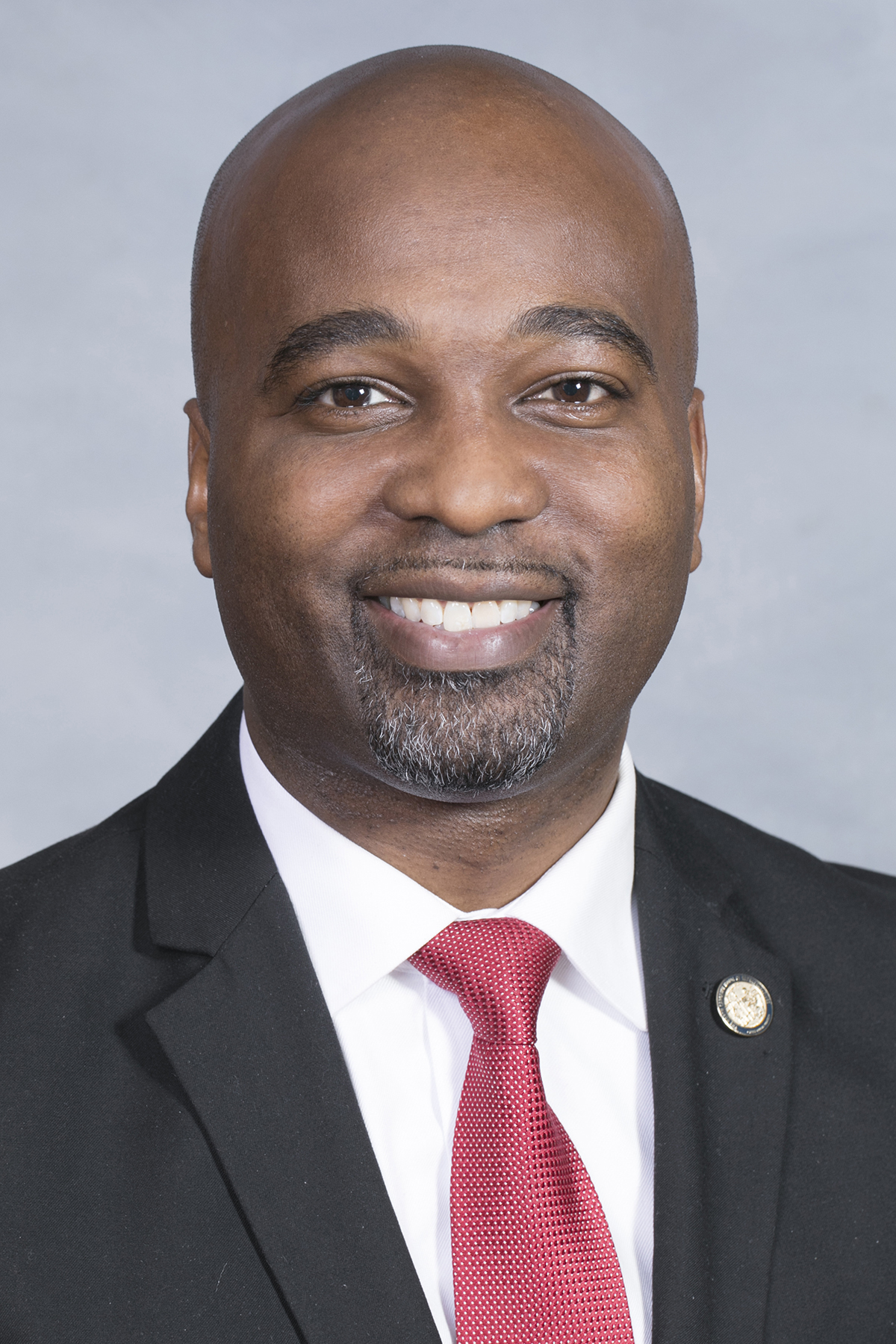
Nominee	Zack Forde-Hawkins
Party	Democratic
Popular vote	43,291
Percentage	100%
State Representative before election
Zack Forde-Hawkins
Democratic
Elected State Representative
Zack Forde-Hawkins
Democratic

The new 31st district includes portions of eastern Durham County. It includes the home of incumbent Democrat Zack Forde-Hawkins, who has represented the 31st district since 2019.

North Carolina House of Representatives 31st district general election, 2024
Party	Candidate	Votes	%
Democratic	Zack Forde-Hawkins (incumbent)	43,291	100%
Total votes		43,291	100%
Democratic hold			

==== District 32 ====
2024 North Carolina's 32nd House district election
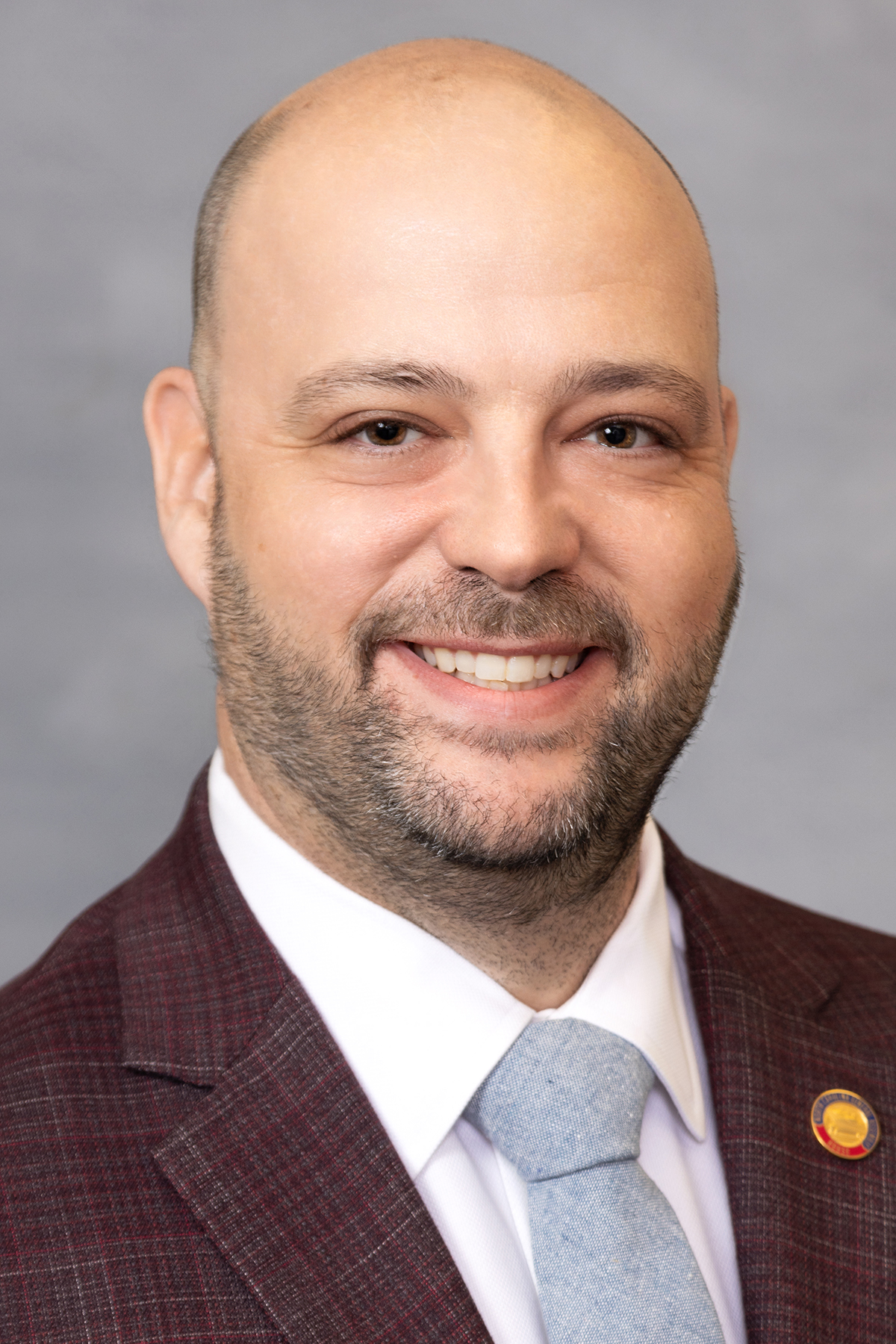

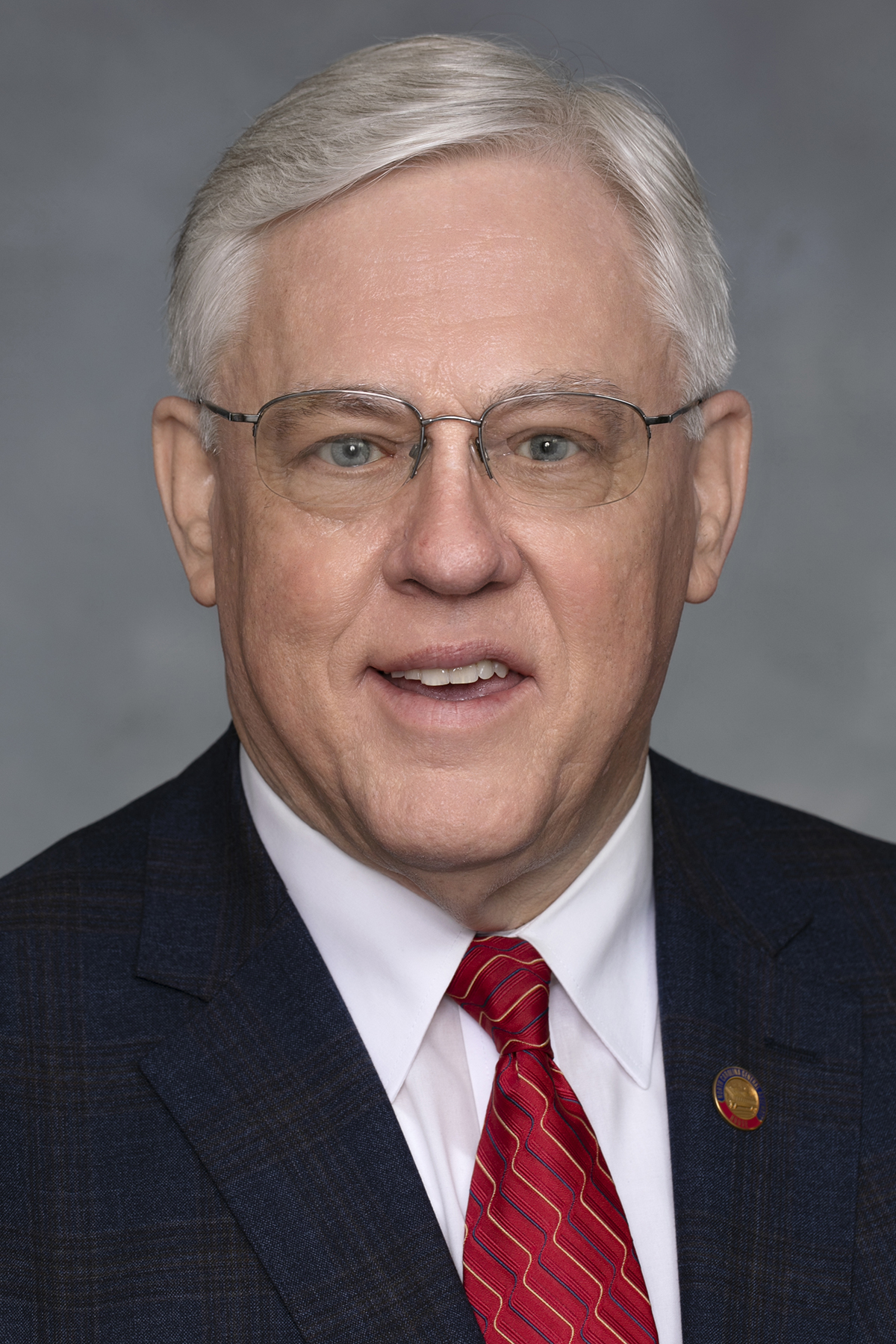
Nominee	Bryan Cohn	Frank Sossamon
Party	Democratic	Republican
Popular vote	21,215	20,987
Percentage	48.95%	48.42%
State Representative before election
Frank Sossamon
Republican
Elected State Representative
Bryan Cohn
Democratic

The new 32nd district includes all of Granville County, as well as portions of northern Vance County. It includes the home of incumbent Republican Frank Sossamon, who has represented the 32nd district since 2023.

North Carolina House of Representatives 32nd district general election, 2024
Party	Candidate	Votes	%
Democratic	Bryan Cohn	21,215	48.95%
Republican	Frank Sossamon (incumbent)	20,987	48.42%
Libertarian	Ryan Brown	1,140	2.63%
Total votes		43,342	100%
Democratic gain from Republican			

==== District 33 ====
2024 North Carolina's 33rd House district election
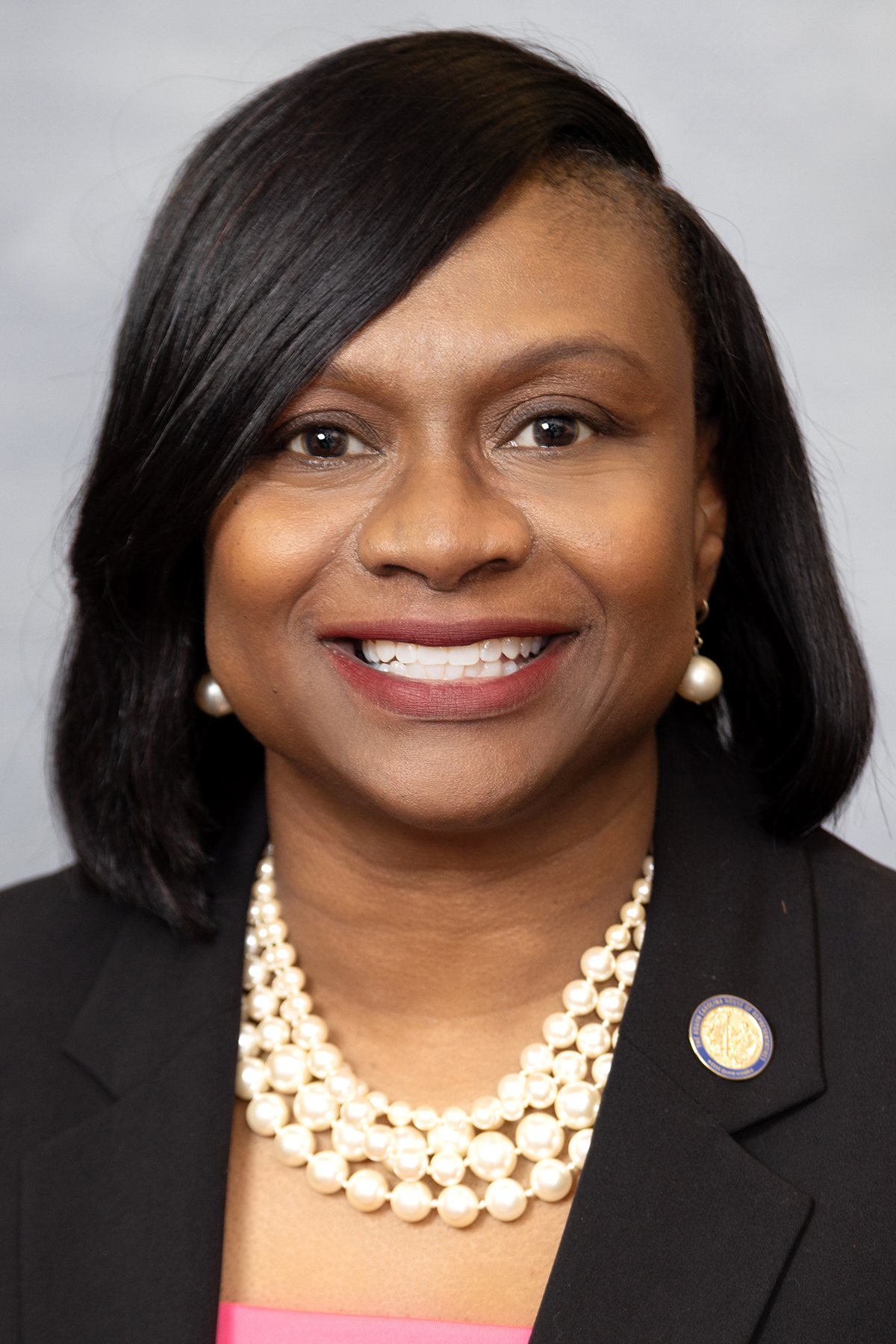

Nominee	Monika Johnson-Hostler	Chris Costello
Party	Democratic	Libertarian
Popular vote	33,771	8,343
Percentage	80.19%	19.81%
State Representative before election
Rosa Gill
Democratic
Elected State Representative
Monika Johnson-Hostler
Democratic

The new 33rd district includes portions of eastern Wake County. It includes the home of incumbent Democrat Rosa Gill, who has represented the 33rd district since 2009. On December 4, 2023, Gill announced her intent to retire after eight terms. Fellow Democrat and Wake County Board of Education member Monika Johnson-Hostler won the open seat.

North Carolina House of Representatives 33rd district Democratic primary election, 2024
Party	Candidate	Votes	%
Democratic	Monika Johnson-Hostler	5,282	60.03%
Democratic	Antoine Marshall	2,269	25.79%
Democratic	Debra Dunston	1,248	14.18%
Total votes		8,799	100%

North Carolina House of Representatives 33rd district general election, 2024
Party	Candidate	Votes	%
Democratic	Monika Johnson-Hostler	33,771	80.19%
Libertarian	Chris Costello	8,343	19.81%
Total votes		42,114	100%
Democratic hold			

==== District 34 ====
2024 North Carolina's 34th House district election
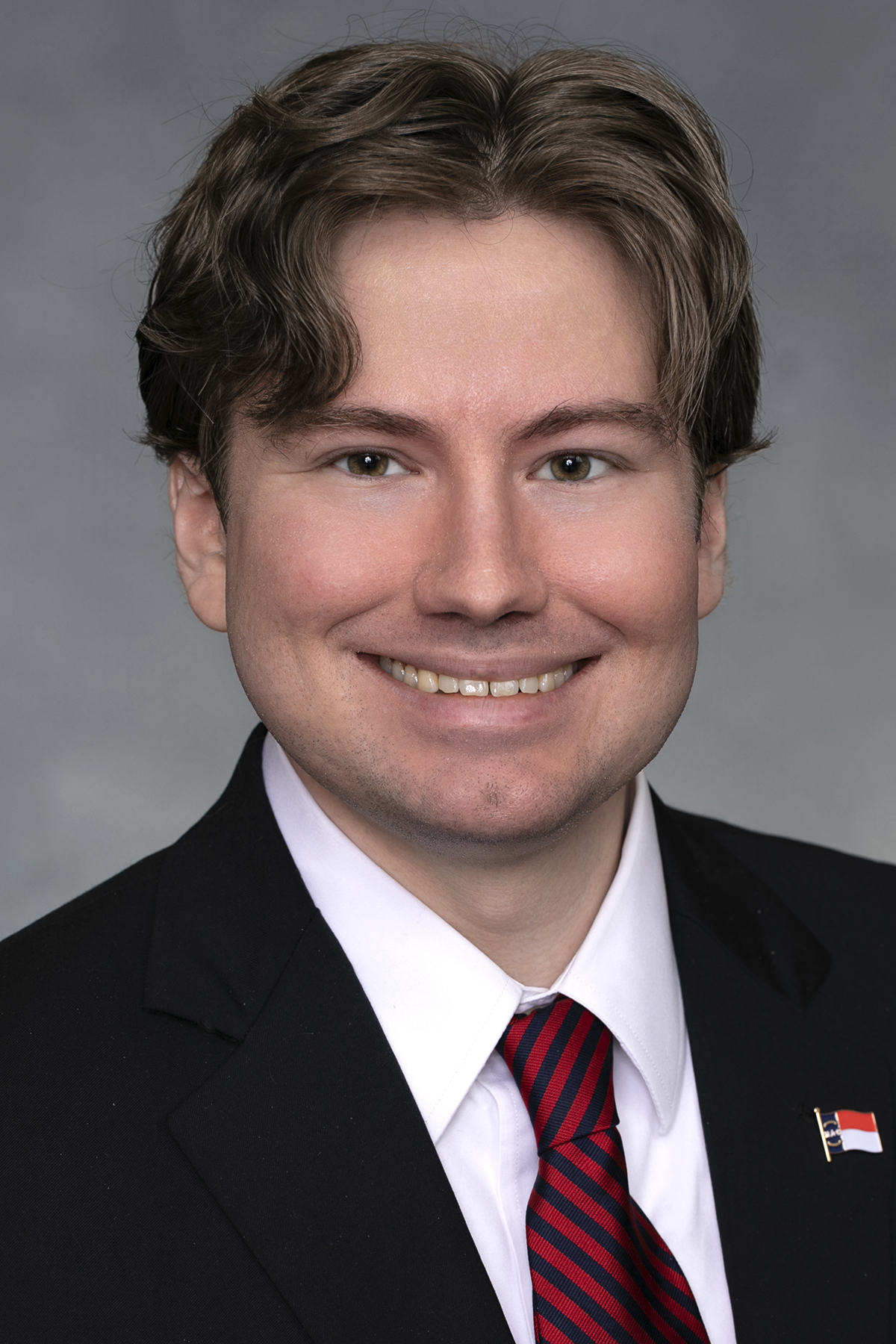

Nominee	Tim Longest	Ed George
Party	Democratic	Libertarian
Popular vote	33,839	10,808
Percentage	75.79%	24.21%
State Representative before election
Tim Longest
Democratic
Elected State Representative
Tim Longest
Democratic

The new 34th district includes portions of central Wake County. It includes the home of incumbent Democrat Tim Longest, who has represented the 34th district since 2023.

North Carolina House of Representatives 34th district general election, 2024
Party	Candidate	Votes	%
Democratic	Tim Longest (incumbent)	33,839	75.79%
Libertarian	Ed George	10,808	24.21%
Total votes		44,647	100%
Democratic hold			

==== District 35 ====
2024 North Carolina's 35th House district election
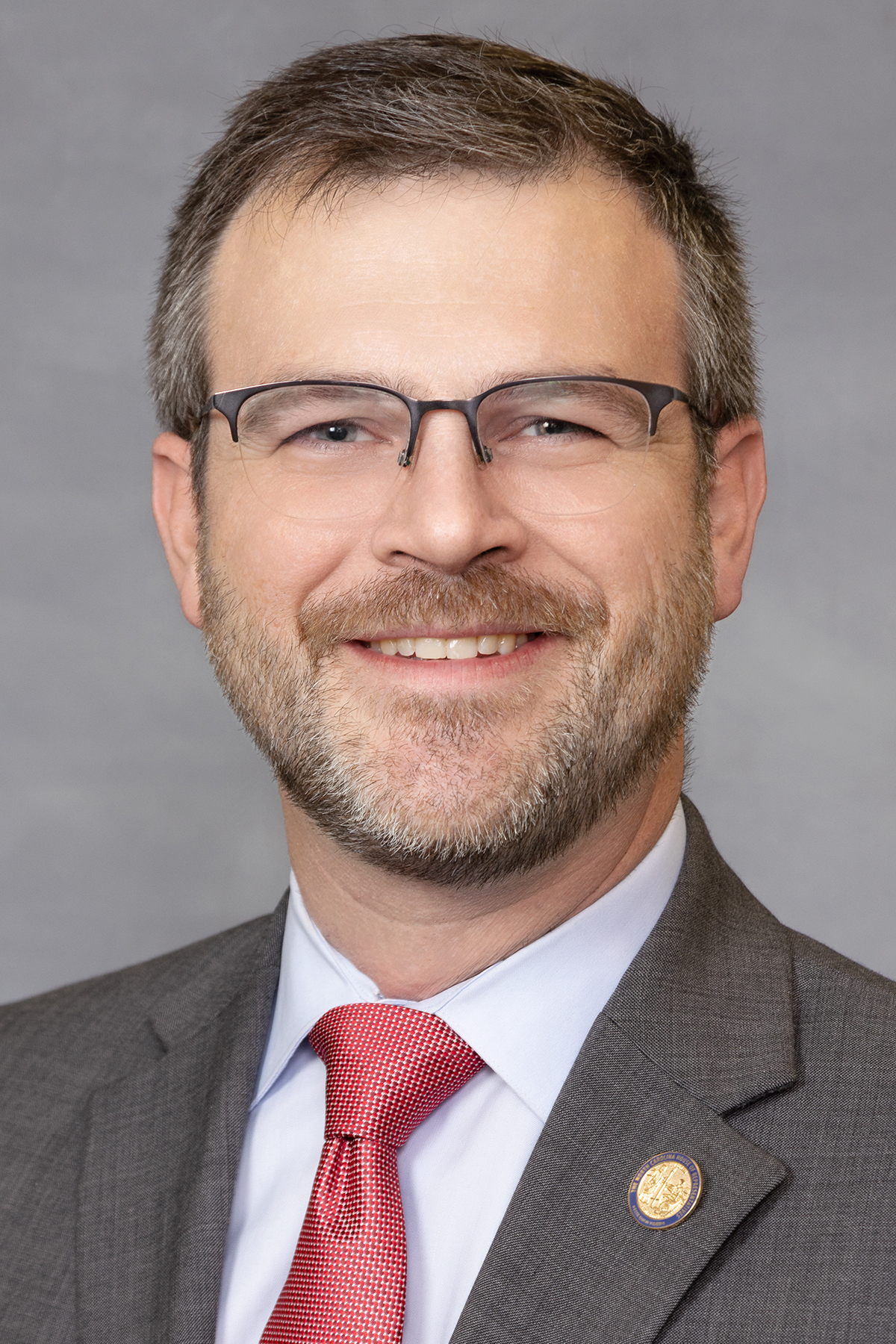

Nominee	Mike Schietzelt	Evonne Hopkins
Party	Republican	Democratic
Popular vote	28,651	26,831
Percentage	50.27%	47.08%
State Representative before election
Terence Everitt
Democratic
Elected State Representative
Mike Schietzelt
Republican

The new 35th district includes portions of northern Wake County. It includes the home of incumbent Democrat Terence Everitt, who has represented the 35th district since 2019. On December 12, 2023, Everitt announced his intent to retire after three terms, announcing a run for the State Senate on December 14, 2023.

North Carolina House of Representatives 35th district Republican primary election, 2024
Party	Candidate	Votes	%
Republican	Mike Schietzelt	6,366	64.82%
Republican	James Norman	3,455	35.18%
Total votes		9,821	100%

North Carolina House of Representatives 35th district general election, 2024
Party	Candidate	Votes	%
Republican	Mike Schietzelt	28,651	50.27%
Democratic	Evonne Hopkins	26,831	47.08%
Libertarian	Michael Oakes	1,513	2.65%
Total votes		56,995	100%
Republican gain from Democratic			

==== District 36 ====
2024 North Carolina's 36th House district election
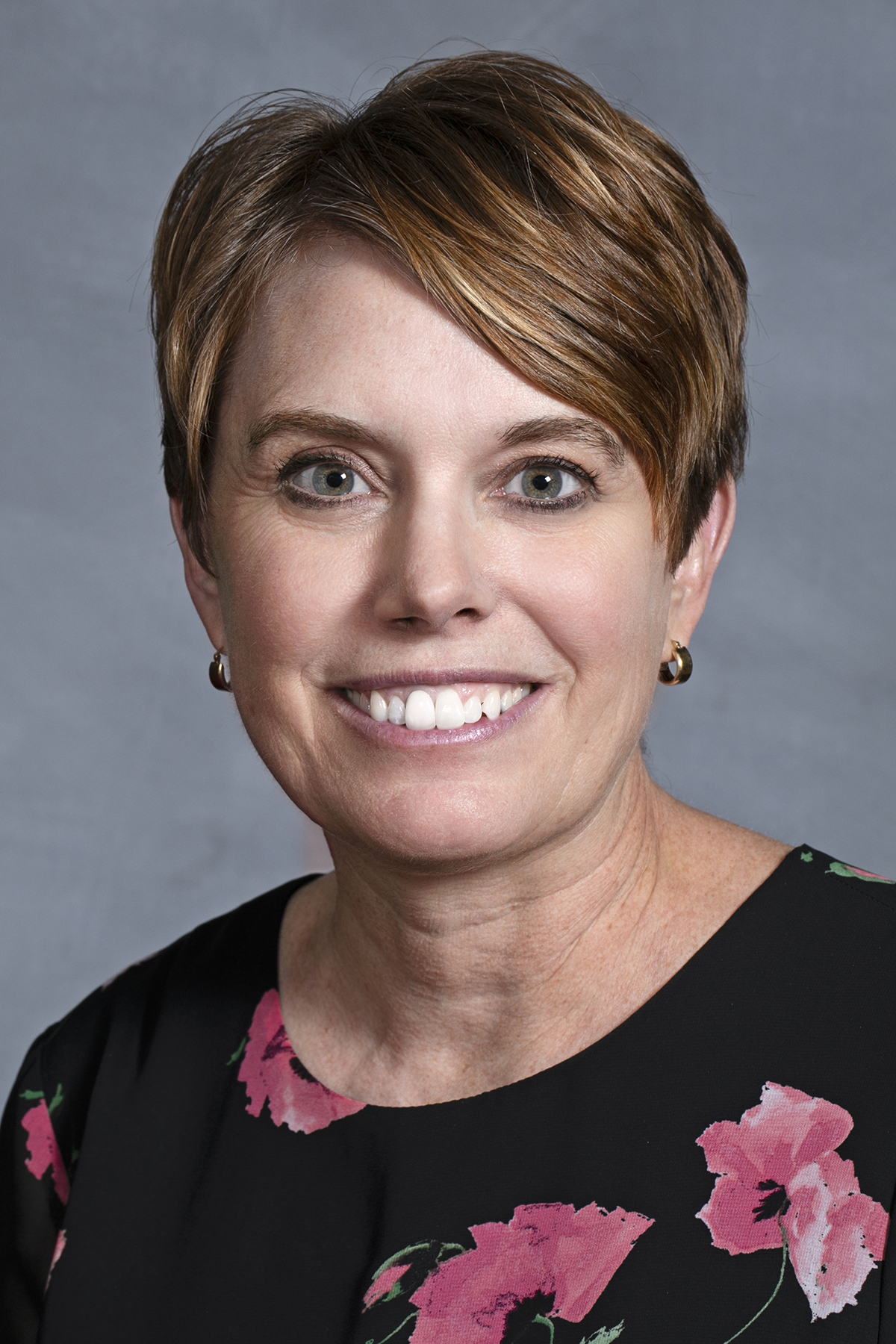

Nominee	Julie von Haefen	Becki Allen
Party	Democratic	Republican
Popular vote	28,629	22,364
Percentage	54.52%	42.59%
State Representative before election
Julie von Haefen
Democratic
Elected State Representative
Julie von Haefen
Democratic

The new 36th district includes portions of southern Wake County. It includes the home of incumbent Democrat Julie von Haefen, who has represented the 36th district since 2019.

North Carolina House of Representatives 36th district general election, 2024
Party	Candidate	Votes	%
Democratic	Julie von Haefen (incumbent)	28,629	54.52%
Republican	Becki Allen	22,364	42.59%
Libertarian	Travis Groo	1,521	2.90%
Total votes		52,514	100%
Democratic hold			

==== District 37 ====
2024 North Carolina's 37th House district election
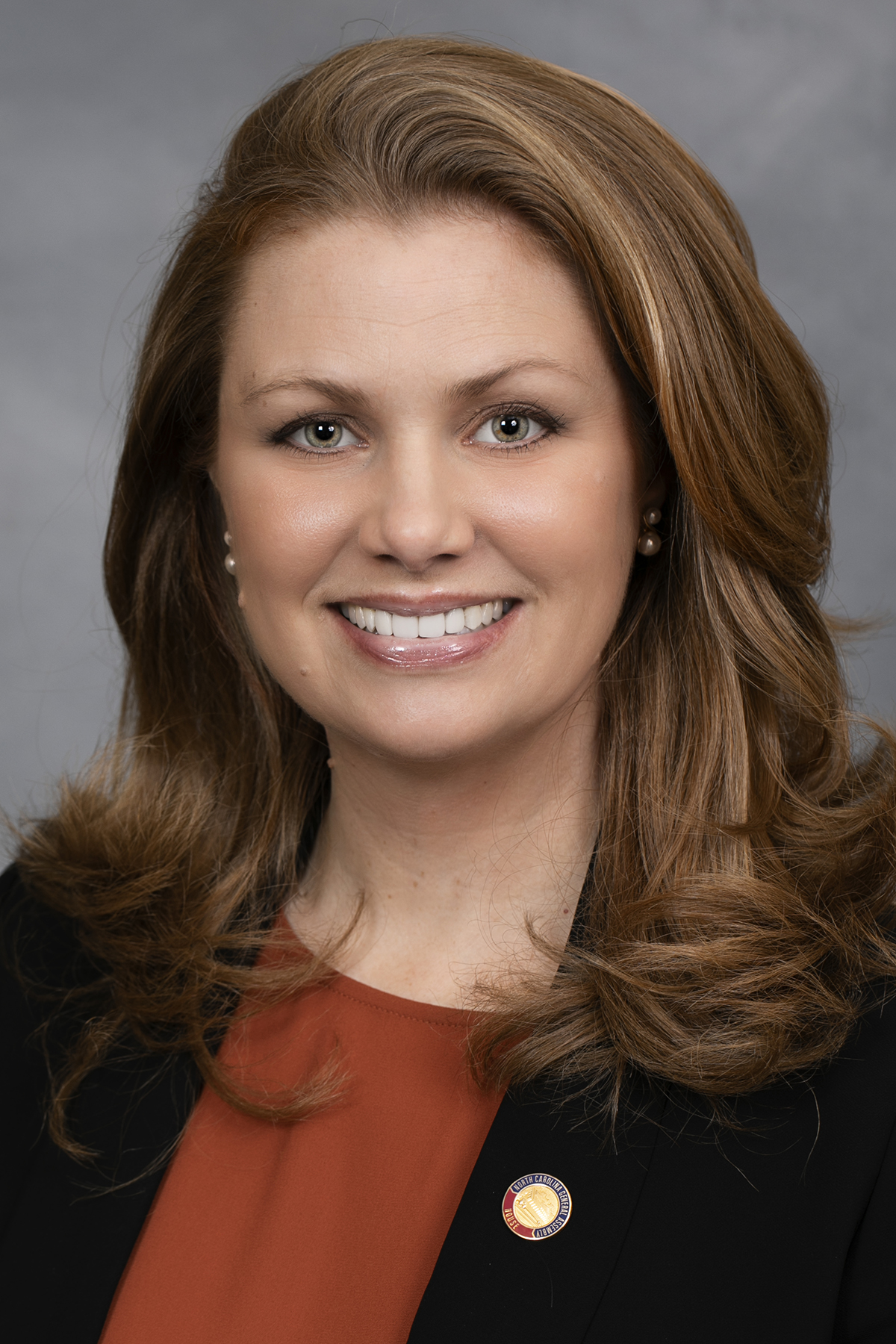

Nominee	Erin Paré	Safiyah Jackson
Party	Republican	Democratic
Popular vote	30,784	27,137
Percentage	51.41%	45.32%
State Representative before election
Erin Paré
Republican
Elected State Representative
Erin Paré
Republican

The new 37th district includes portions of southern Wake County. It includes the home of incumbent Republican Erin Paré, who has represented the 37th district since 2021.

North Carolina House of Representatives 37th district general election, 2024
Party	Candidate	Votes	%
Republican	Erin Paré (incumbent)	30,784	51.41%
Democratic	Safiyah Jackson	27,137	45.32%
Libertarian	Christopher Robinson	1,963	3.28%
Total votes		59,884	100%
Republican hold			

==== District 38 ====
2024 North Carolina's 38th House district election
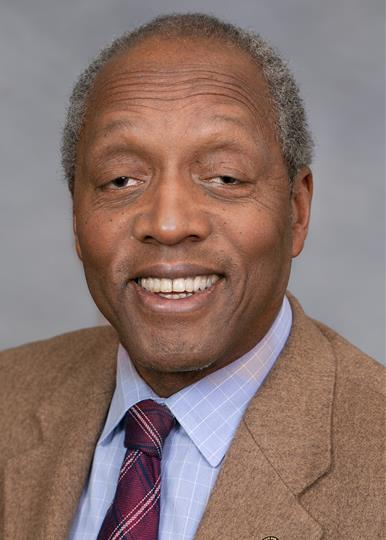
Nominee	Abe Jones
Party	Democratic
Popular vote	32,854
Percentage	100%
State Representative before election
Abe Jones
Democratic
Elected State Representative
Abe Jones
Democratic

The new 38th district includes portions of central Wake County. It includes the home of incumbent Democrat Abe Jones, who has represented the 38th District since 2021.

North Carolina House of Representatives 38th district general election, 2024
Party	Candidate	Votes	%
Democratic	Abe Jones (incumbent)	32,854	100%
Total votes		32,854	100%
Democratic hold			

==== District 39 ====
2024 North Carolina's 39th House district election
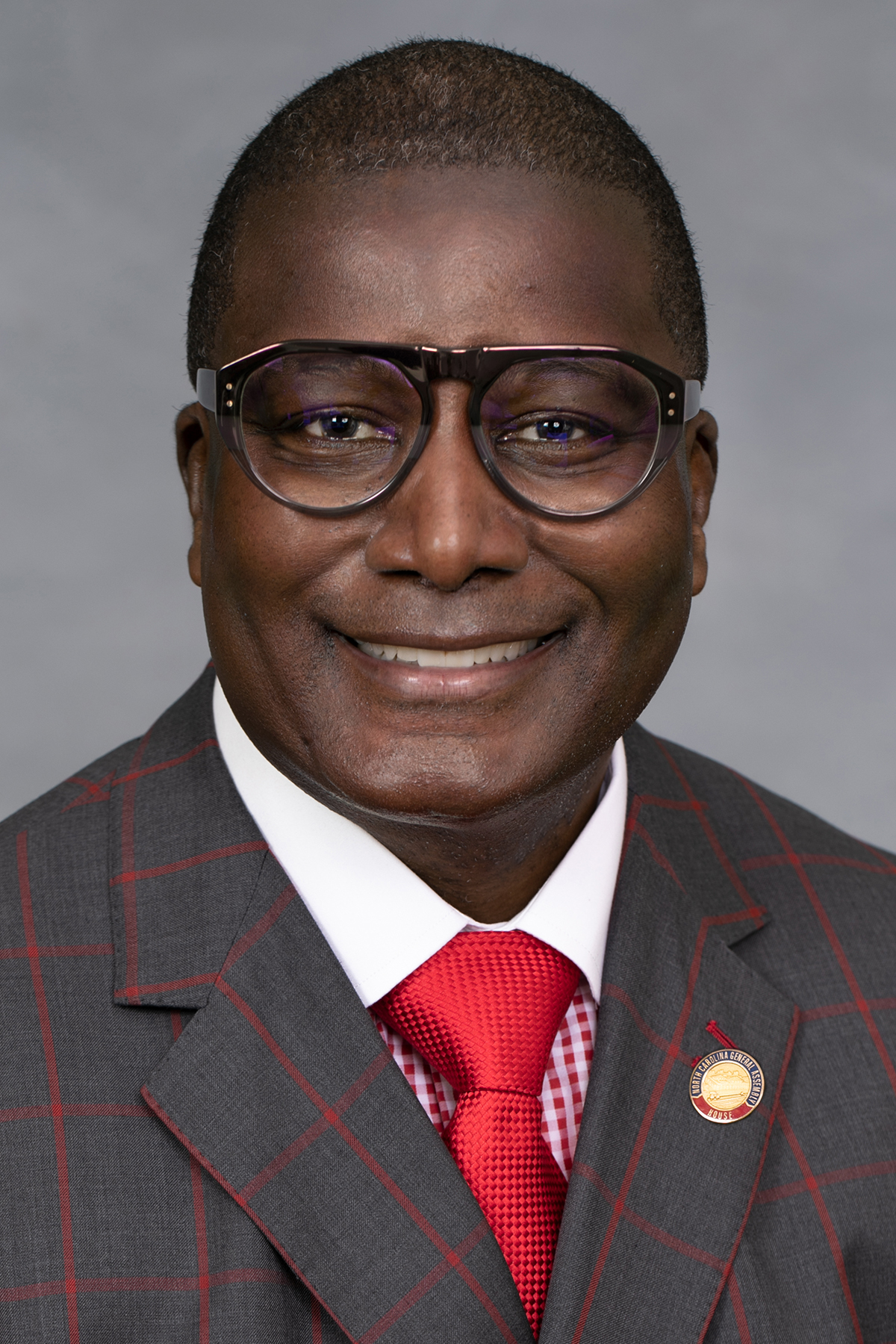
Nominee	James Roberson
Party	Democratic
Popular vote	36,730
Percentage	100%
State Representative before election
James Roberson
Democratic
Elected State Representative
James Roberson
Democratic

The new 39th district includes portions of northern Wake County. It includes the home of incumbent Democrat James Roberson, who has represented the 39th district since 2021.

North Carolina House of Representatives 39th district general election, 2024
Party	Candidate	Votes	%
Democratic	James Roberson (incumbent)	36,730	100%
Total votes		36,730	100%
Democratic hold			

=== Districts 40-59 ===
==== District 40 ====
2024 North Carolina's 40th House district election
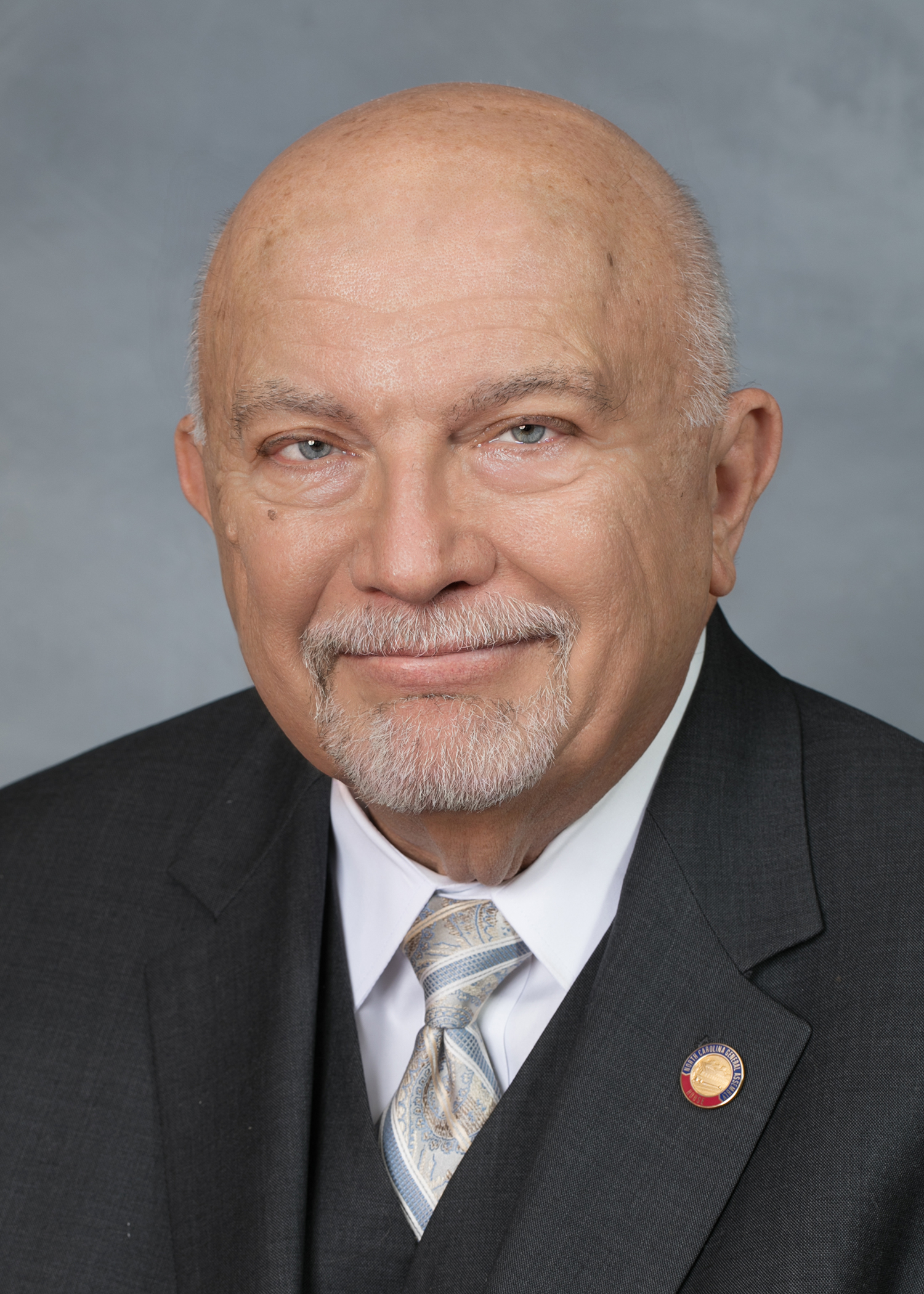

Nominee	Joe John	Jerry Doliner
Party	Democratic	Republican
Popular vote	32,983	18,332
Percentage	62.32%	34.64%
State Representative before election
Joe John
Democratic
Elected State Representative
Joe John
Democratic

The new 40th district includes portions of northwestern Wake County. It includes the home of incumbent Democrat Joe John, who has represented the 40th district since 2017.

North Carolina House of Representatives 40th district general election, 2024
Party	Candidate	Votes	%
Democratic	Joe John (incumbent)	32,983	62.32%
Republican	Jerry Doliner	18,332	34.64%
Libertarian	Michael Munger	1,612	3.05%
Total votes		52,927	100%
Democratic hold			

==== District 41 ====
2024 North Carolina's 41st House district election
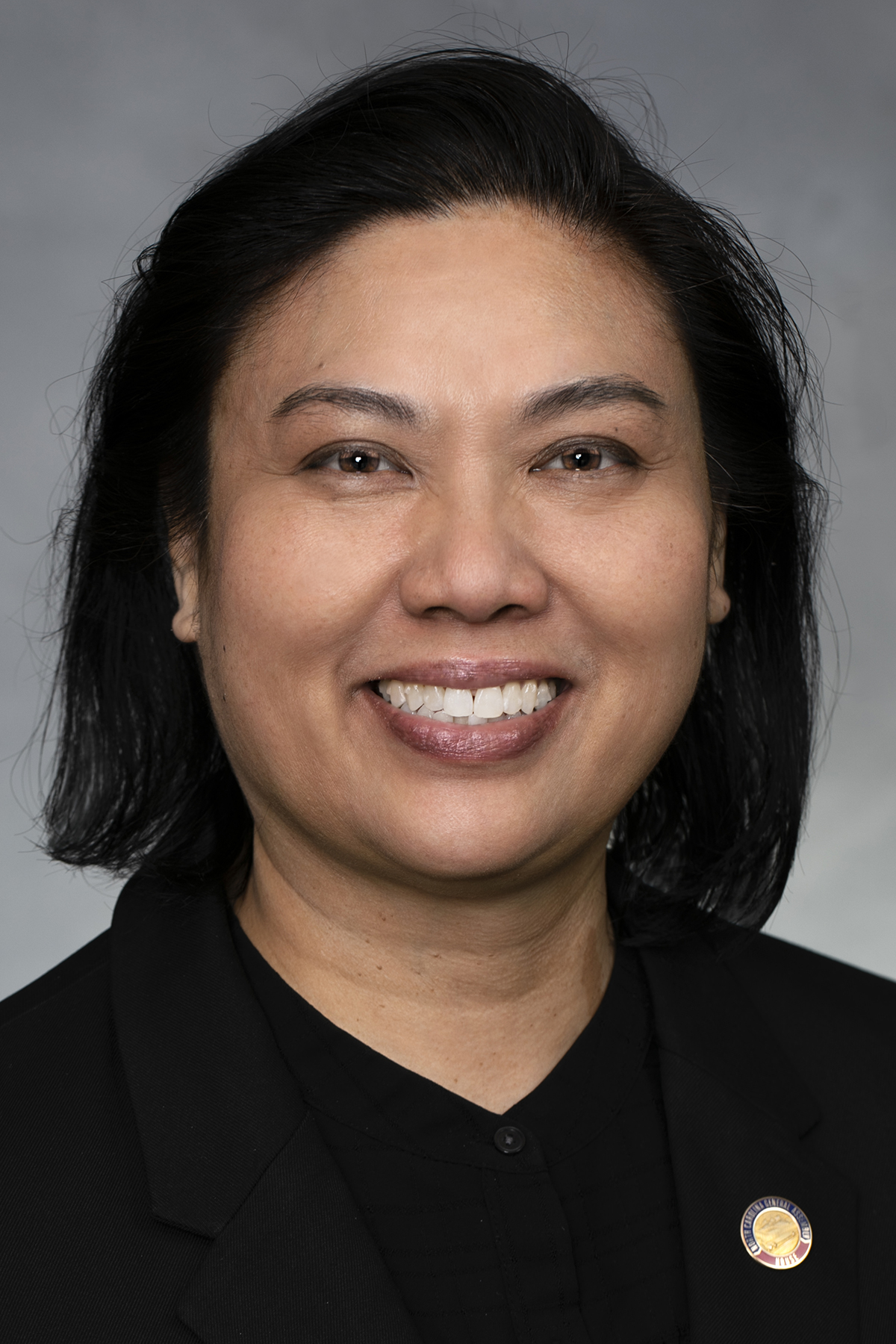

Nominee	Maria Cervania	Matthew Laszacs
Party	Democratic	Libertarian
Popular vote	31,576	9,659
Percentage	76.58%	23.42%
State Representative before election
Maria Cervania
Democratic
Elected State Representative
Maria Cervania
Democratic

The new 41st district includes portions of western Wake County. It includes the home of incumbent Democrat Maria Cervania, who has represented the 41st district since 2023.

North Carolina House of Representatives 41st district general election, 2024
Party	Candidate	Votes	%
Democratic	Maria Cervania (incumbent)	31,576	76.58%
Libertarian	Matthew Laszacs	9,659	23.42%
Total votes		41,235	100%
Democratic hold			

==== District 42 ====
2024 North Carolina's 42nd House district election
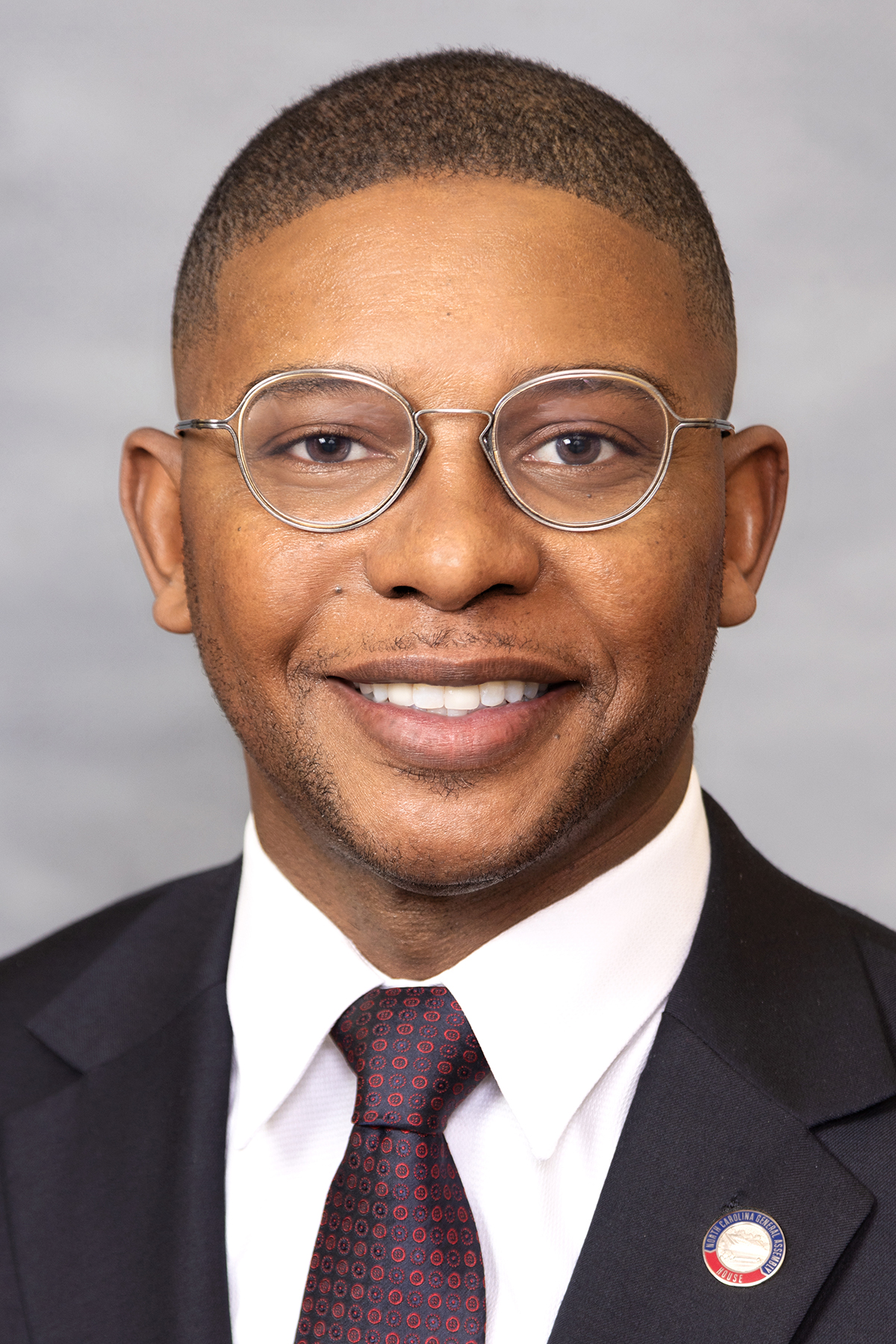

Nominee	Mike Colvin	Leonard Bryant
Party	Democratic	Republican
Popular vote	18,301	6,332
Percentage	74.29%	25.71%
State Representative before election
Marvin Lucas
Democratic
Elected State Representative
Mike Colvin
Democratic

The new 42nd district includes portions of northwestern Cumberland County. It includes the home of incumbent Democrat Marvin Lucas, who has represented the 42nd district since 2001. On December 6, 2023, Lucas announced his intent to retire after twelve terms.

North Carolina House of Representatives 42nd district Democratic primary election, 2024
Party	Candidate	Votes	%
Democratic	Mike Colvin	1,778	35.02%
Democratic	Naveed Aziz	1,471	28.97%
Democratic	Elmer Floyd	1,147	22.59%
Democratic	Courtney Banks-McLaughlin	681	13.41%
Total votes		5,077	100%

North Carolina House of Representatives 42nd district general election, 2024
Party	Candidate	Votes	%
Democratic	Mike Colvin	18,301	74.29%
Republican	Leonard Bryant	6,332	25.71%
Total votes		24,633	100%
Democratic hold			

==== District 43 ====
2024 North Carolina's 43rd House district election
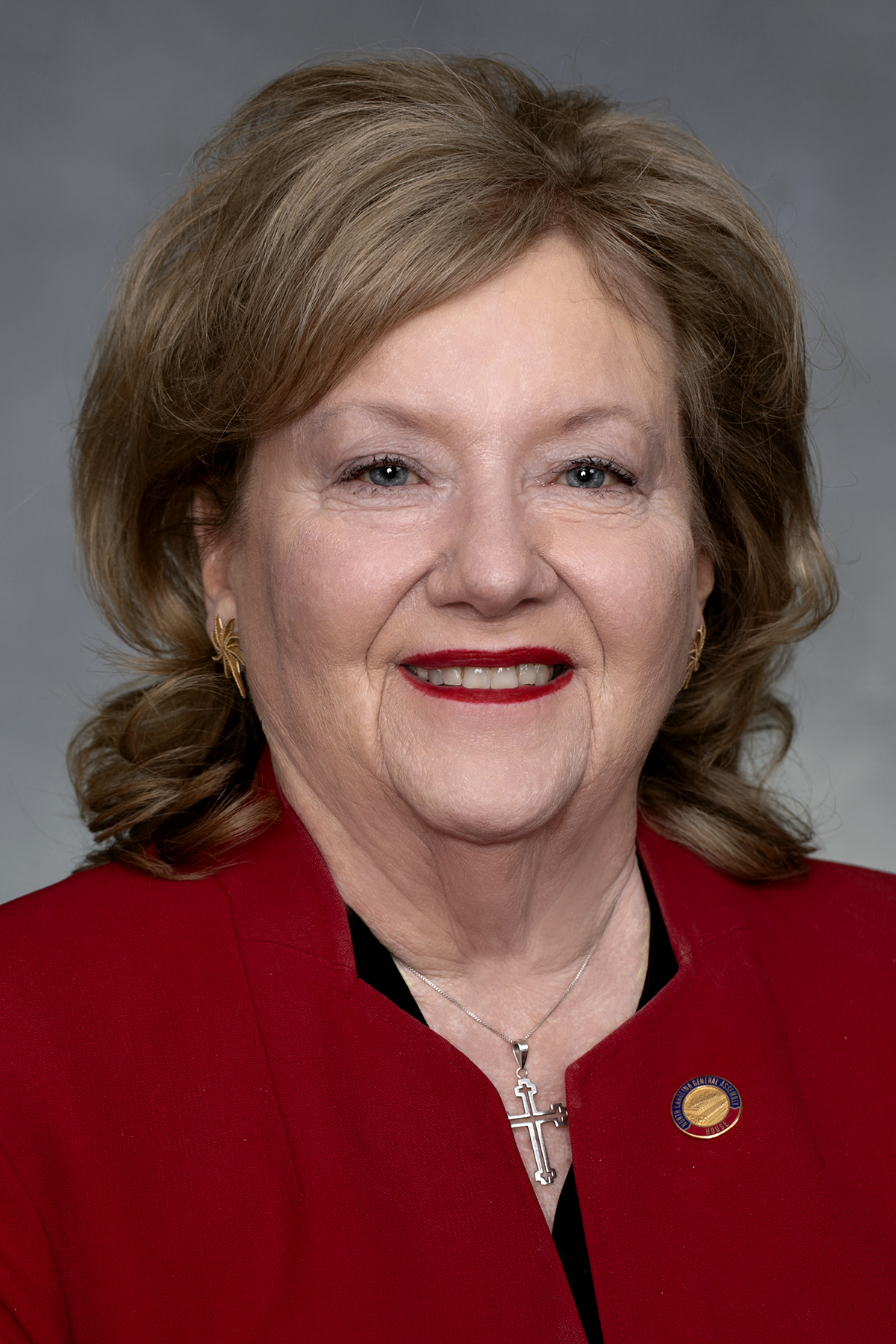

Nominee	Diane Wheatley	Janene Ackles
Party	Republican	Democratic
Popular vote	24,753	18,422
Percentage	57.33%	42.67%
State Representative before election
Diane Wheatley
Republican
Elected State Representative
Diane Wheatley
Republican

The new 43rd district includes portions of eastern Cumberland County. It includes the home of incumbent Republican Diane Wheatley, who has represented the 43rd district since 2021.

North Carolina House of Representatives 43rd district general election, 2024
Party	Candidate	Votes	%
Republican	Diane Wheatley (incumbent)	24,753	57.33%
Democratic	Janene Ackles	18,422	42.67%
Total votes		43,175	100%
Republican hold			

==== District 44 ====
2024 North Carolina's 44th House district election
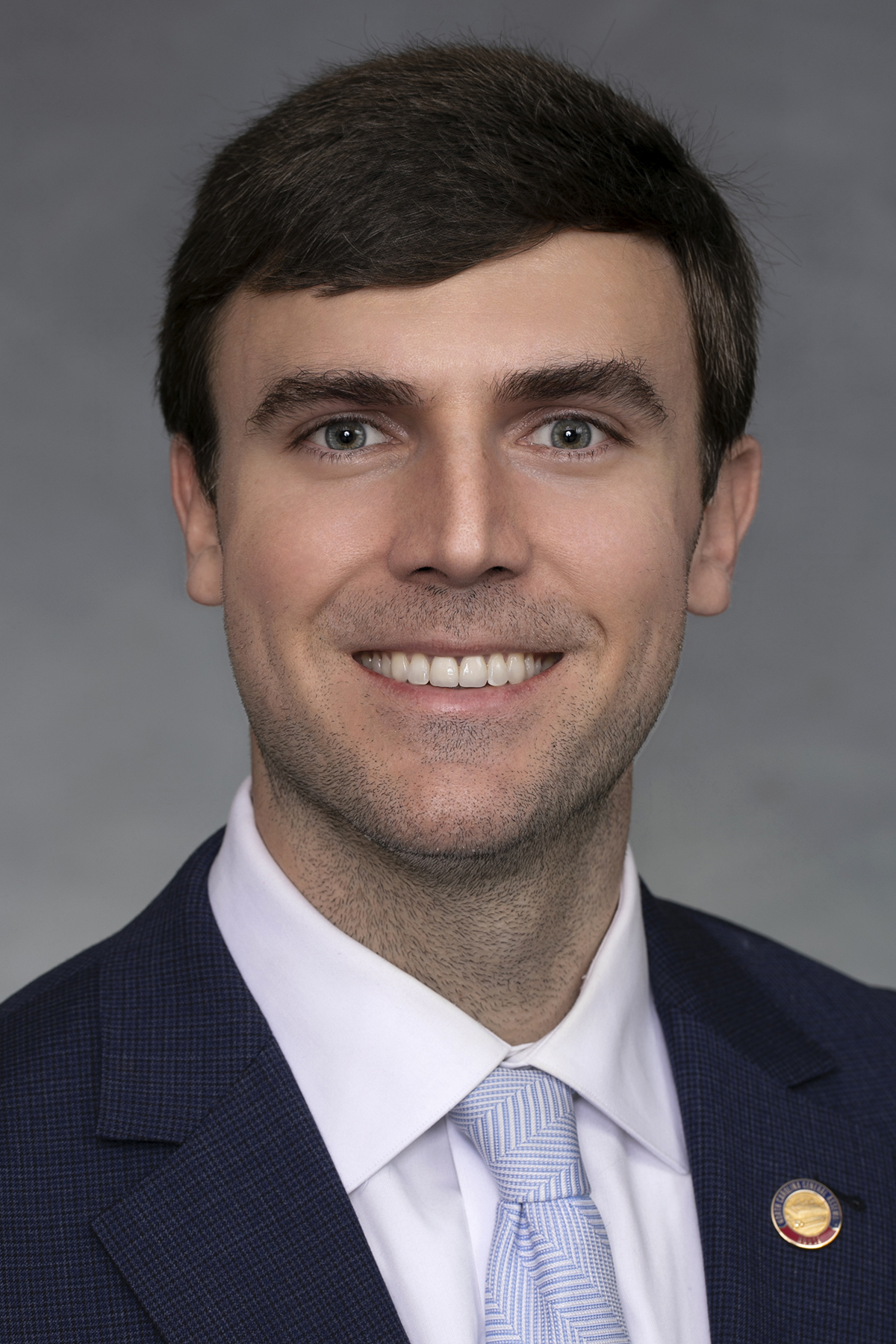

Nominee	Charles Smith	Freddie de la Cruz
Party	Democratic	Republican
Popular vote	20,941	12,683
Percentage	62.28%	37.72%
State Representative before election
Charles Smith
Democratic
Elected State Representative
Charles Smith
Democratic

The new 44th district includes portions of western Cumberland County. It includes the home of incumbent Democrat Charles Smith, who has represented the 44th district since 2023. Libertarian nominee Christina Aragues withdrew from the race.

North Carolina House of Representatives 44th district Libertarian primary election, 2024
Party	Candidate	Votes	%
Libertarian	Christina Aragues	21	55.26%
Libertarian	Angel Yaklin	17	44.74%
Total votes		38	100%

North Carolina House of Representatives 44th district general election, 2024
Party	Candidate	Votes	%
Democratic	Charles Smith (incumbent)	20,941	62.28%
Republican	Freddie de la Cruz	12,683	37.72%
Total votes		33,624	100%
Democratic hold			

==== District 45 ====
2024 North Carolina's 45th House district election
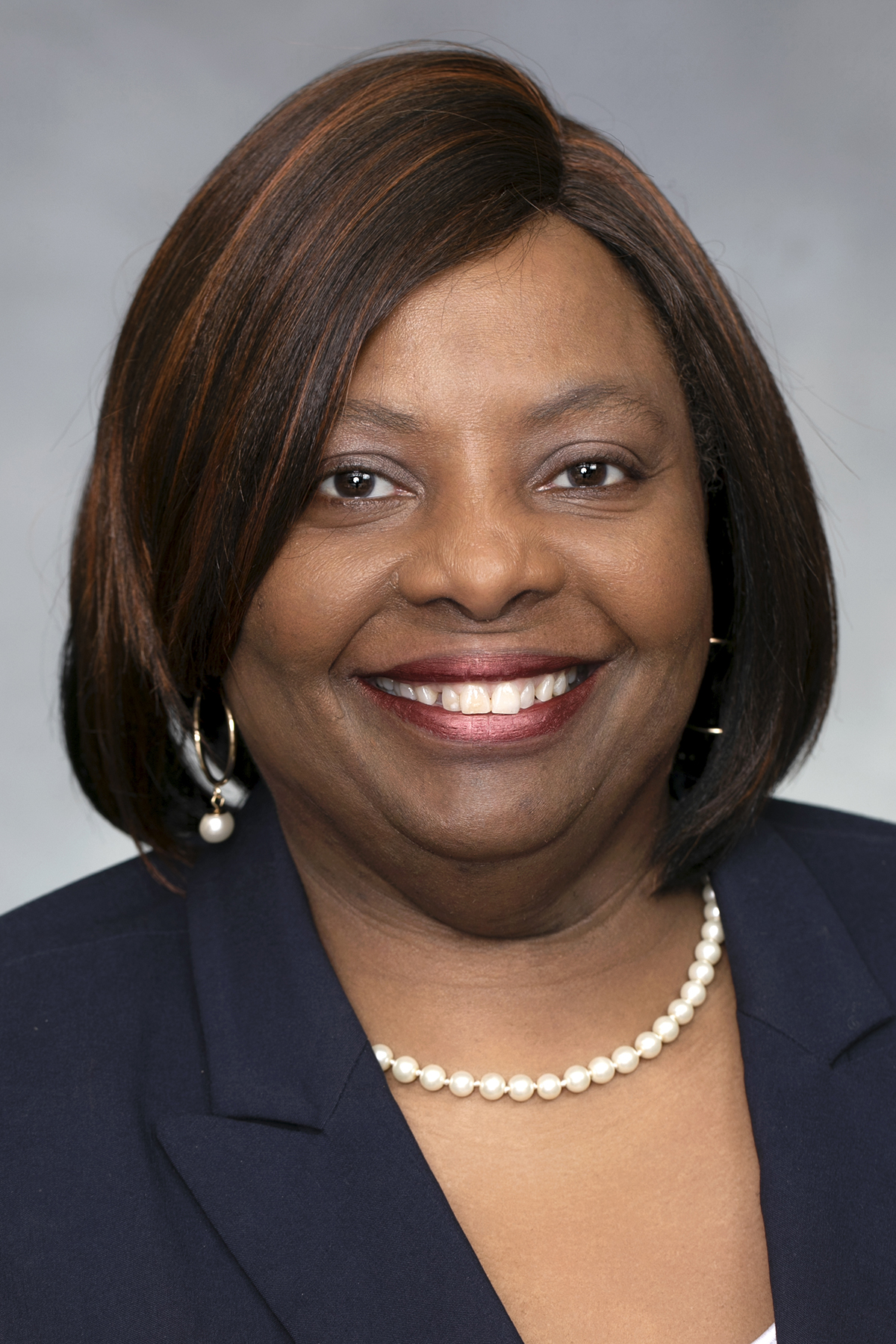
Nominee	Frances Jackson
Party	Democratic
Popular vote	25,090
Percentage	100%
State Representative before election
Frances Jackson
Democratic
Elected State Representative
Frances Jackson
Democratic

The new 45th district includes portions of western Cumberland County. It includes the home of incumbent Democrat Frances Jackson, who has represented the 45th district since 2023.

North Carolina House of Representatives 45th district general election, 2024
Party	Candidate	Votes	%
Democratic	Frances Jackson (incumbent)	25,090	100%
Total votes		25,090	100%
Democratic hold			

==== District 46 ====
2024 North Carolina's 46th House district election
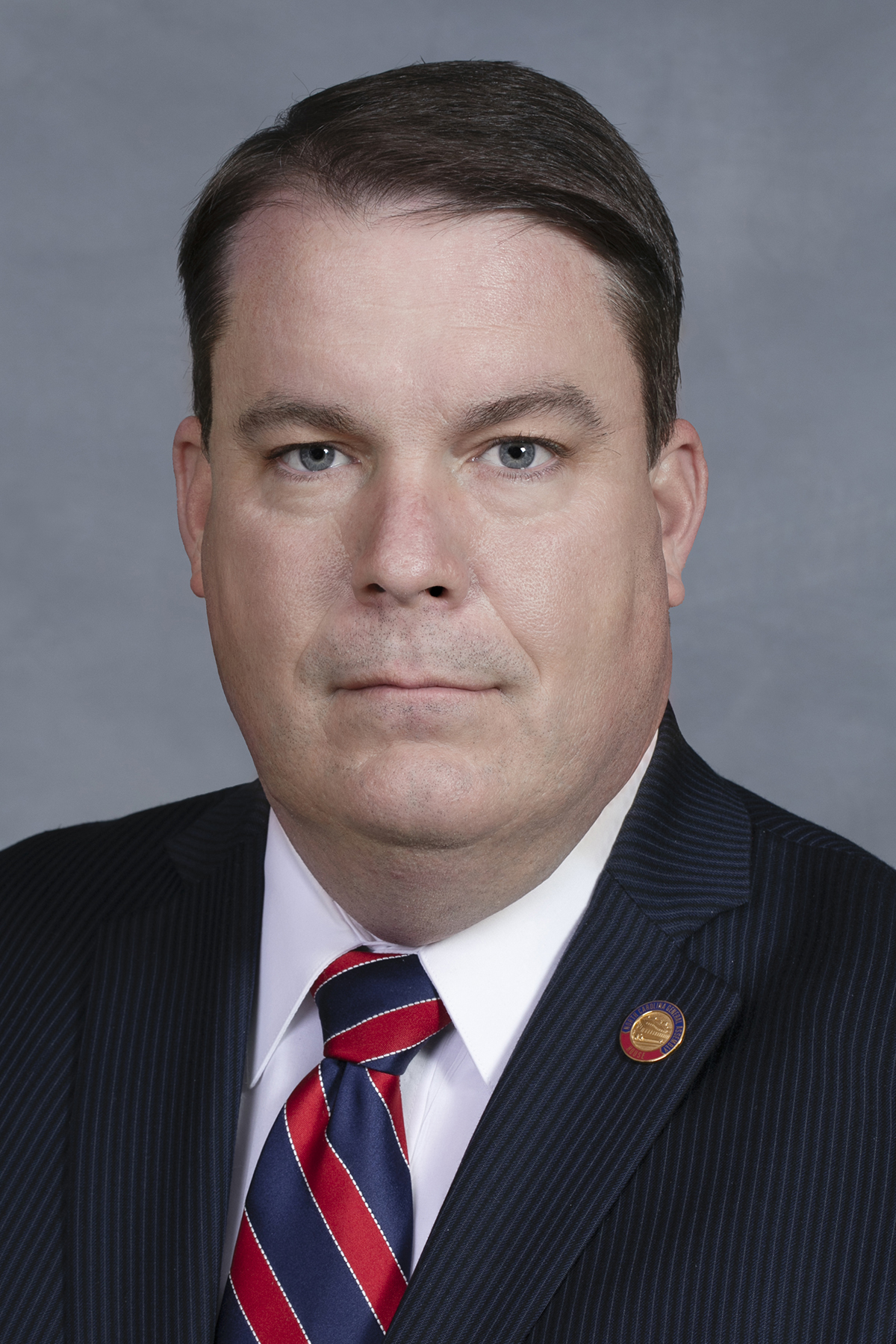
Nominee	Brenden Jones
Party	Republican
Popular vote	29,064
Percentage	100%
State Representative before election
Brenden Jones
Republican
Elected State Representative
Brenden Jones
Republican

The new 46th district includes all of Columbus County and portions of eastern Robeson County. It includes the home of incumbent Republican Brenden Jones, who has represented the 46th district since 2017.

North Carolina House of Representatives 46th district general election, 2024
Party	Candidate	Votes	%
Republican	Brenden Jones (incumbent)	29,064	100%
Total votes		29,064	100%
Republican hold			

==== District 47 ====
2024 North Carolina's 47th House district election
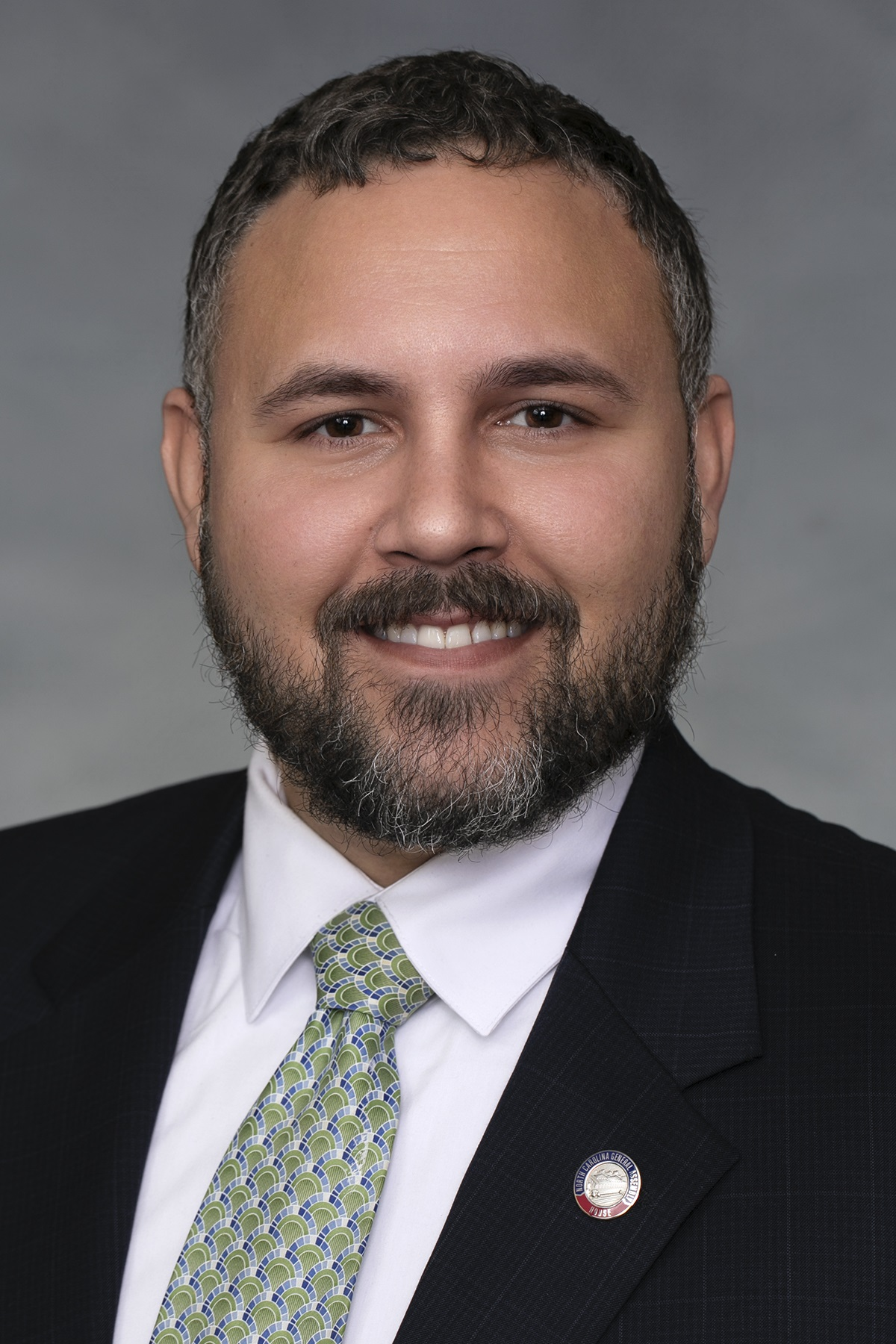

Nominee	Jarrod Lowery	Eshonda Hooper
Party	Republican	Democratic
Popular vote	20,428	11,182
Percentage	64.63%	35.37%
State Representative before election
Jarrod Lowery
Republican
Elected State Representative
Jarrod Lowery
Republican

The new 47th district includes most of Robeson County. It includes the home of incumbent Republican Jarrod Lowery, who has represented the 47th district since 2023.

North Carolina House of Representatives 47th district general election, 2024
Party	Candidate	Votes	%
Republican	Jarrod Lowery (incumbent)	20,428	64.63%
Democratic	Eshonda Hooper	11,182	35.37%
Total votes		31,610	100%
Republican hold			

==== District 48 ====
2024 North Carolina's 48th House district election
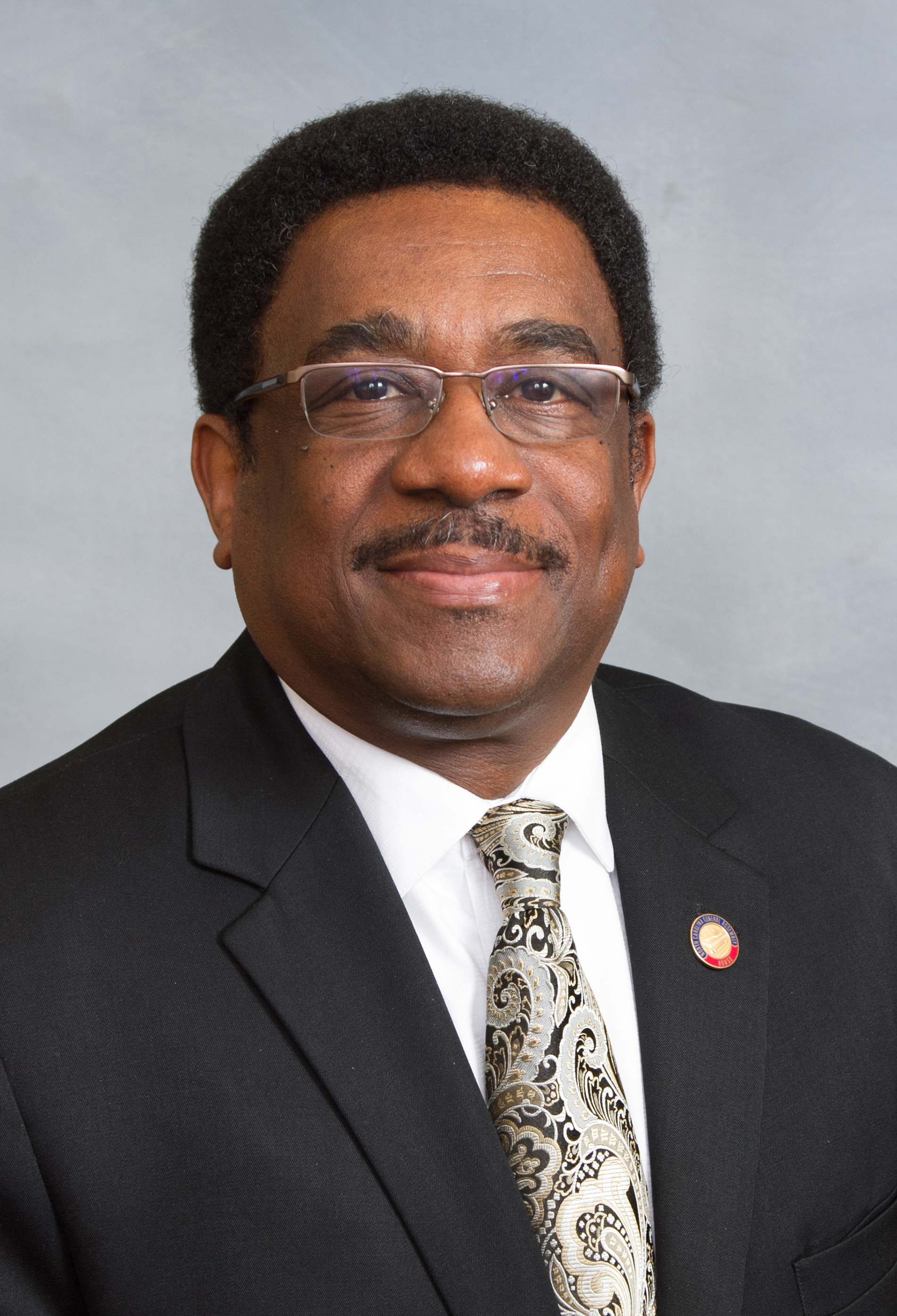

Nominee	Garland Pierce	Ralph Carter
Party	Democratic	Republican
Popular vote	18,845	17,453
Percentage	51.92%	48.08%
State Representative before election
Garland Pierce
Democratic
Elected State Representative
Garland Pierce
Democratic

The new 48th district includes all of Hoke and Scotland counties. It includes the home of incumbent Democrat Garland Pierce, who has represented the 48th district since 2005.

North Carolina House of Representatives 48th district Republican primary election, 2024
Party	Candidate	Votes	%
Republican	Ralph Carter	2,262	53.86%
Republican	Melissa Swarbrick	1,563	37.21%
Republican	James Diaz	375	8.93%
Total votes		4,200	100%

North Carolina House of Representatives 48th district general election, 2024
Party	Candidate	Votes	%
Democratic	Garland Pierce (incumbent)	18,845	51.92%
Republican	Ralph Carter	17,453	48.08%
Total votes		36,298	100%
Democratic hold			

==== District 49 ====
2024 North Carolina's 49th House district election
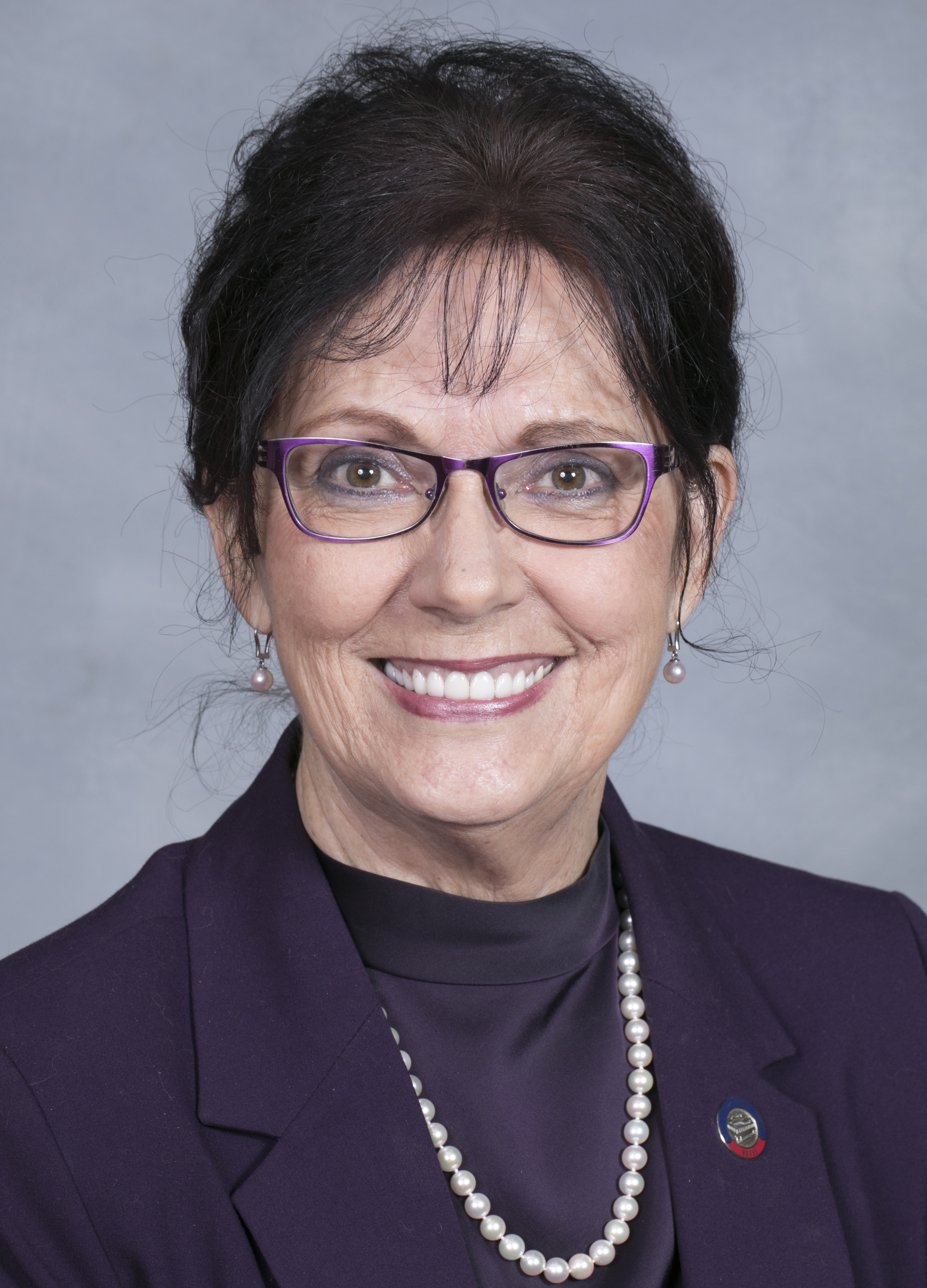
Nominee	Cynthia Ball
Party	Democratic
Popular vote	32,814
Percentage	100%
State Representative before election
Cynthia Ball
Democratic
Elected State Representative
Cynthia Ball
Democratic

The new 49th district includes portions of central Wake County. It includes the home of incumbent Democrat Cynthia Ball, who has represented the 49th district since 2017.

North Carolina House of Representatives 49th district general election, 2024
Party	Candidate	Votes	%
Democratic	Cynthia Ball (incumbent)	32,814	100%
Total votes		32,814	100%
Democratic hold			

==== District 50 ====
2024 North Carolina's 50th House district election
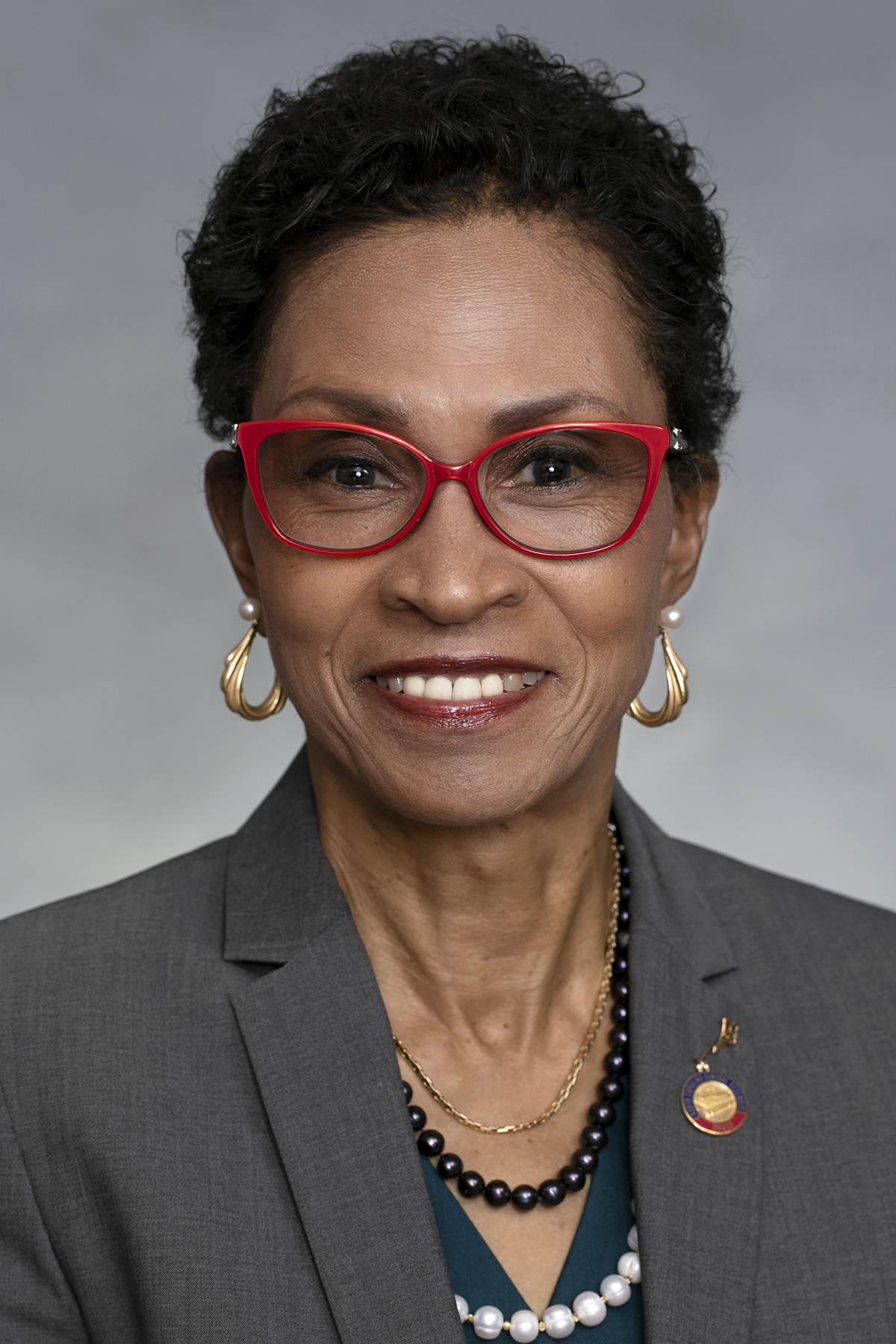
Nominee	Renee Price
Party	Democratic
Popular vote	35,367
Percentage	100%
State Representative before election
Renee Price
Democratic
Elected State Representative
Renee Price
Democratic

The new 50th district includes all of Caswell County and most of Orange County. It includes the home of incumbent Democrat Renee Price, who has represented the 50th district since 2023.

North Carolina House of Representatives 50th district general election, 2024
Party	Candidate	Votes	%
Democratic	Renee Price (incumbent)	35,367	100%
Total votes		35,367	100%
Democratic hold			

==== District 51 ====
2024 North Carolina's 51st House district election
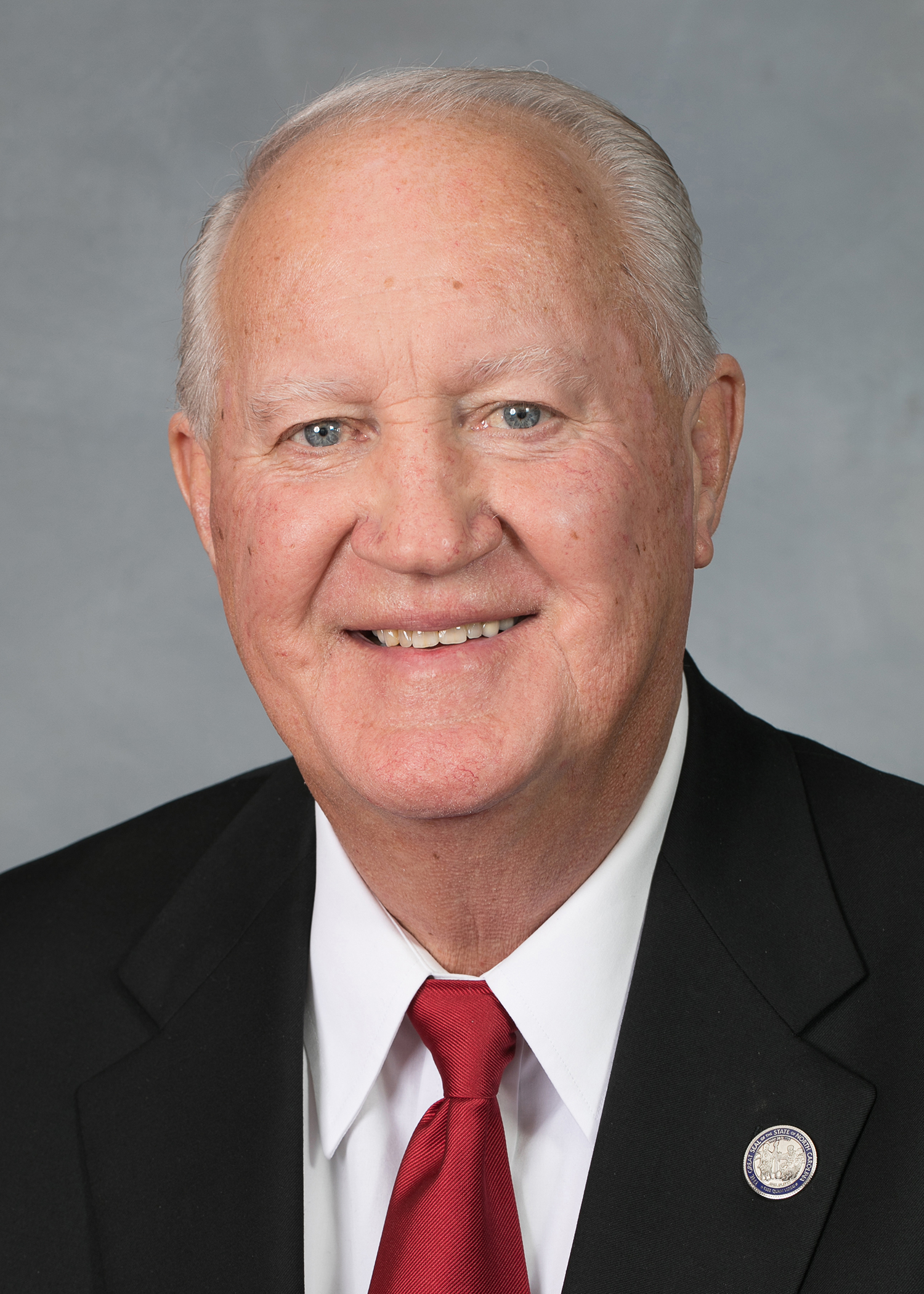

Nominee	John Sauls	Ginger Bauerband
Party	Republican	Democratic
Popular vote	25,829	14,339
Percentage	64.30%	35.70%
State Representative before election
John Sauls
Republican
Elected State Representative
John Sauls
Republican

The new 51st district includes all of Lee County and portions of eastern Moore County. It includes the home of incumbent Republican John Sauls, who has represented the 51st district since 2017.

North Carolina House of Representatives 51st district general election, 2024
Party	Candidate	Votes	%
Republican	John Sauls (incumbent)	25,829	64.30%
Democratic	Ginger Bauerband	14,339	35.70%
Total votes		40,168	100%
Republican hold			

==== District 52 ====
2024 North Carolina's 52nd House district election
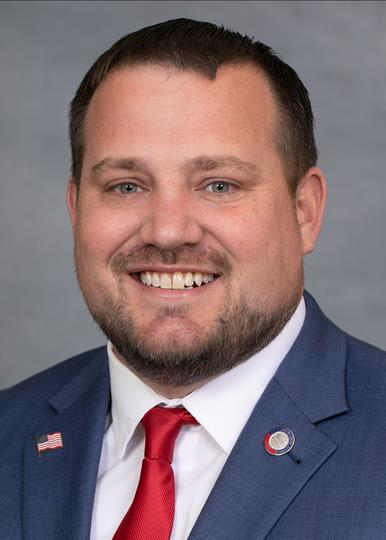

Nominee	Ben Moss	Jimmy Self
Party	Republican	Democratic
Popular vote	25,835	16,466
Percentage	61.07%	38.93%
State Representative before election
Ben Moss
Republican
Elected State Representative
Ben Moss
Republican

The new 52nd district includes all of Richmond County and portions of southern Moore County. It includes the home of incumbent Republican Ben Moss, who has represented the 52nd district and its predecessors since 2021. Initially, on December 20, 2022, Moss announced his intent to retire after two terms and announced a run for Labor Commissioner, but on July 19, 2023, he withdrew from that race and announced he would run for a third term.

North Carolina House of Representatives 52nd district general election, 2024
Party	Candidate	Votes	%
Republican	Ben Moss (incumbent)	25,835	61.07%
Democratic	Jimmy Self	16,466	38.93%
Total votes		42,301	100%
Republican hold			

==== District 53 ====
2024 North Carolina's 53rd House district election
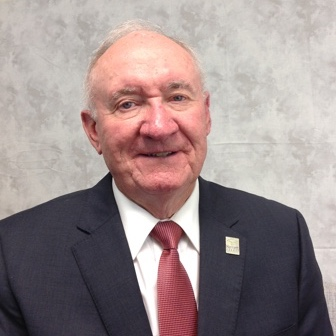

Nominee	Howard Penny Jr.	Kevin Thurman
Party	Republican	Democratic
Popular vote	28,867	17,007
Percentage	62.93%	37.07%
State Representative before election
Howard Penny Jr.
Republican
Elected State Representative
Howard Penny Jr.
Republican

The new 53rd district includes portions of northwestern Johnston County and eastern Harnett County. It includes the home of incumbent Republican Howard Penny Jr., who has represented the 53rd district since 2020.

North Carolina House of Representatives 53rd district general election, 2024
Party	Candidate	Votes	%
Republican	Howard Penny Jr. (incumbent)	28,867	62.93%
Democratic	Kevin Thurman	17,007	37.07%
Total votes		45,874	100%
Republican hold			

==== District 54 ====
2024 North Carolina's 54th House district election
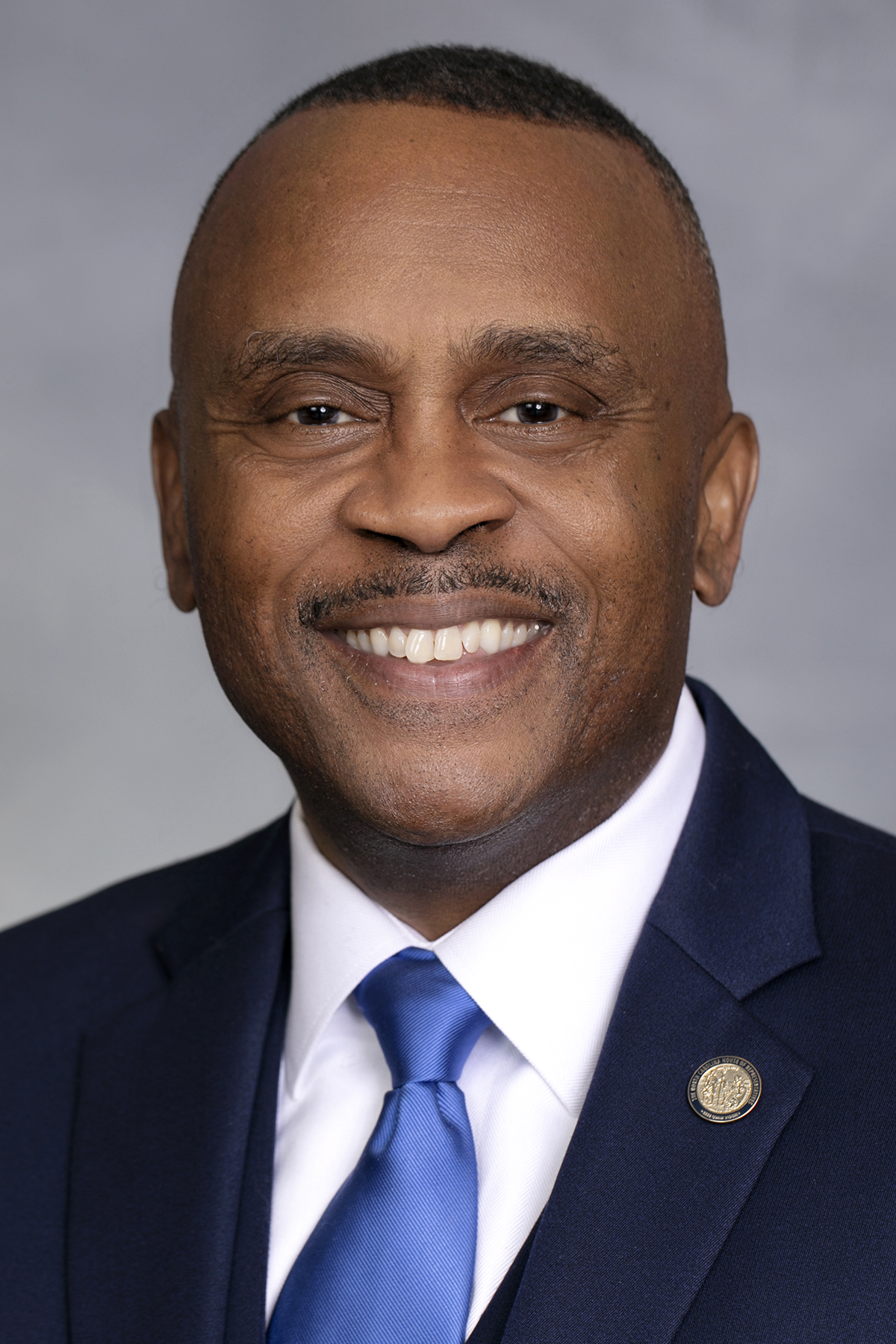

Nominee	Robert Reives	Joe Godfrey
Party	Democratic	Republican
Popular vote	29,910	24,714
Percentage	54.76%	45.24%
State Representative before election
Robert Reives
Democratic
Elected State Representative
Robert Reives
Democratic

The new 54th district includes all of Chatham County and a small portion of northeastern Randolph County. It includes the home of incumbent Democratic Minority Leader Robert Reives, who has represented the 54th district since 2014.

North Carolina House of Representatives 54th district general election, 2024
Party	Candidate	Votes	%
Democratic	Robert Reives (incumbent)	29,910	54.76%
Republican	Joe Godfrey	24,714	45.24%
Total votes		54,624	100%
Democratic hold			

==== District 55 ====
2024 North Carolina's 55th House district election
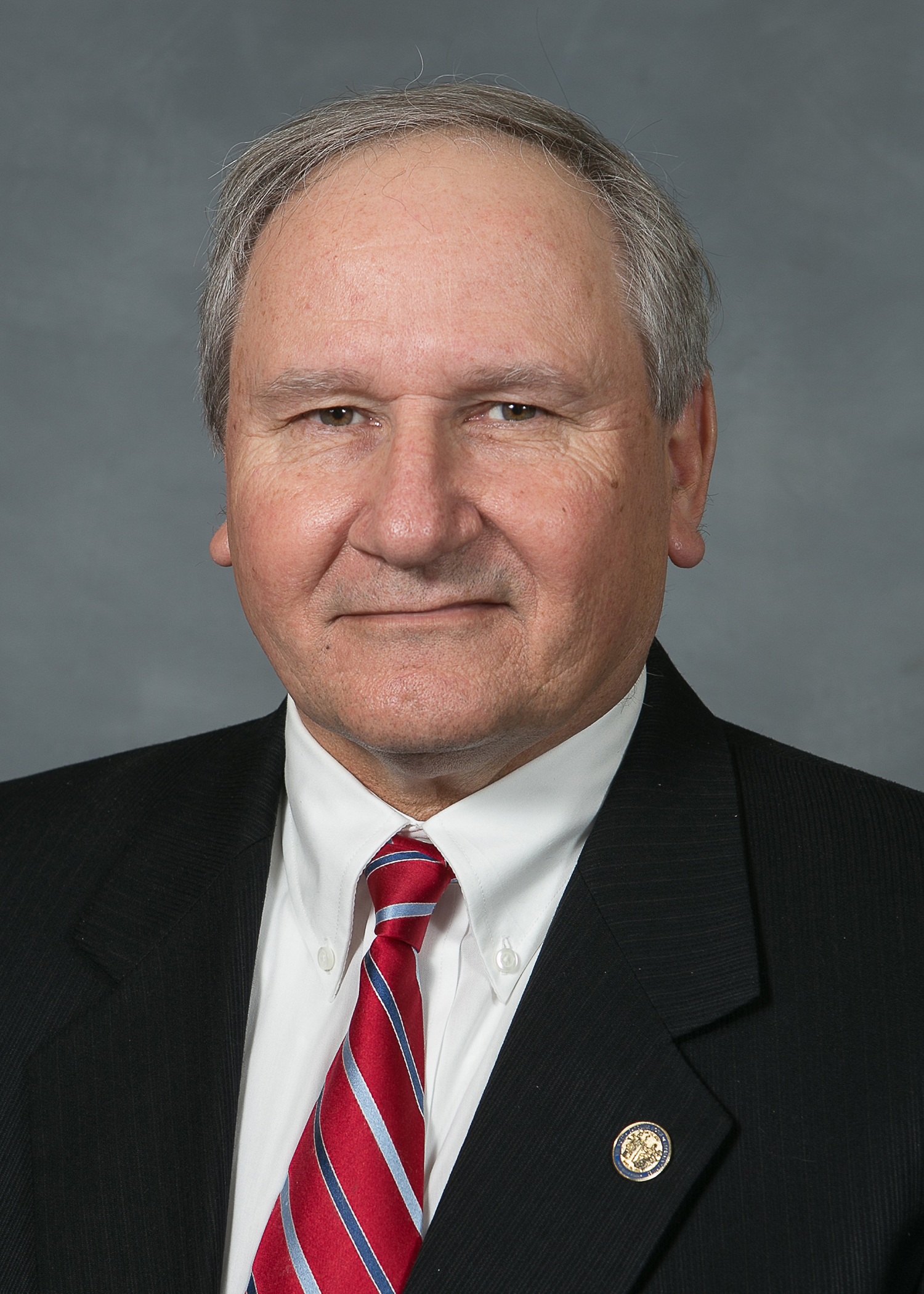

Nominee	Mark Brody	Judy Little
Party	Republican	Democratic
Popular vote	24,474	14,373
Percentage	63.00%	37.00%
State Representative before election
Mark Brody
Republican
Elected State Representative
Mark Brody
Republican

The new 55th district includes all of Anson County, and most of Union County. It includes the home of incumbent Republican Mark Brody, who has represented the 55th district since 2013.

North Carolina House of Representatives 55th district Republican primary election, 2024
Party	Candidate	Votes	%
Republican	Mark Brody (incumbent)	6,094	81.93%
Republican	Richard Miller	917	12.33%
Republican	Arthur McDonald	427	5.74%
Total votes		7,438	100%

North Carolina House of Representatives 55th district general election, 2024
Party	Candidate	Votes	%
Republican	Mark Brody (incumbent)	24,474	63.00%
Democratic	Judy Little	14,373	37.00%
Total votes		38,847	100%
Republican hold			

==== District 56 ====
2024 North Carolina's 56th House district election
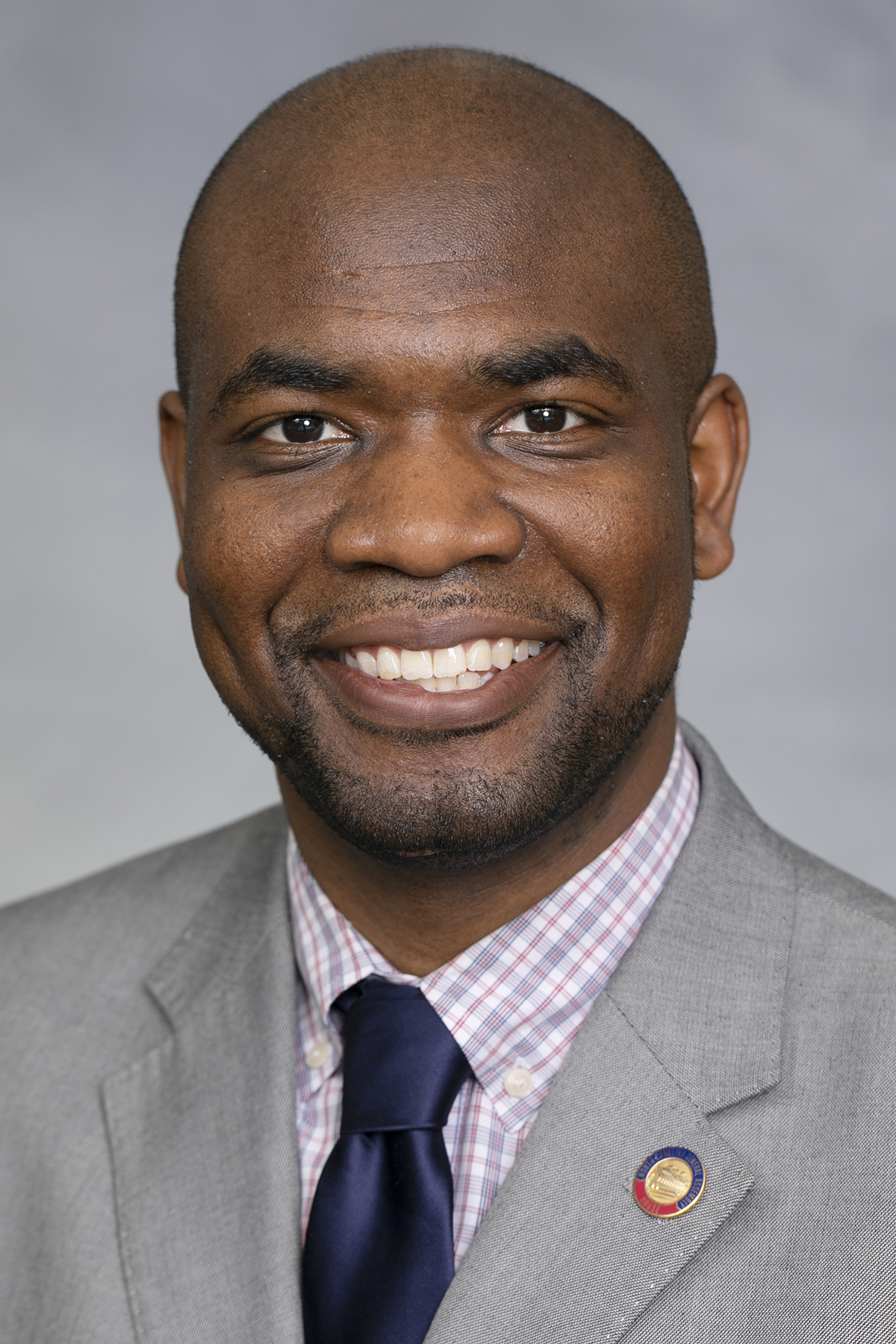

Nominee	Allen Buansi	Jeffrey Hoagland
Party	Democratic	Republican
Popular vote	39,459	6,267
Percentage	86.29%	13.71%
State Representative before election
Allen Buansi
Democratic
Elected State Representative
Allen Buansi
Democratic

The new 56th district includes portions of southeastern Orange County. It includes the home of incumbent Democrat Allen Buansi, who has represented the 56th district since 2022.

North Carolina House of Representatives 56th district general election, 2024
Party	Candidate	Votes	%
Democratic	Allen Buansi (incumbent)	39,459	86.29%
Republican	Jeffrey Hoagland	6,267	13.71%
Total votes		45,726	100%
Democratic hold			

==== District 57 ====
2024 North Carolina's 57th House district election
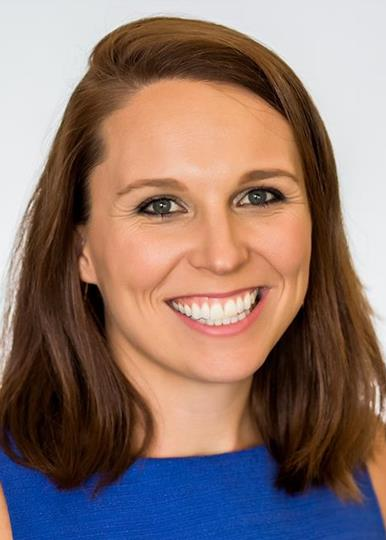

Nominee	Tracy Clark	Janice Davis
Party	Democratic	Republican
Popular vote	31,986	14,955
Percentage	68.14%	31.86%
State Representative before election
Tracy Clark
Democratic
Elected State Representative
Tracy Clark
Democratic

The new 57th district includes portions of central Guilford County. It had included the home of incumbent Democratic Deputy Minority Leader Ashton Clemmons, who had represented the 57th district since 2019. Clemmons resigned her seat on August 5, 2024 and fellow Democrat Tracy Clark was appointed to replace her on August 6, 2024.

North Carolina House of Representatives 57th district general election, 2024
Party	Candidate	Votes	%
Democratic	Tracy Clark (incumbent)	31,986	68.14%
Republican	Janice Davis	14,955	31.86%
Total votes		46,941	100%
Democratic hold			

==== District 58 ====
2024 North Carolina's 58th House district election
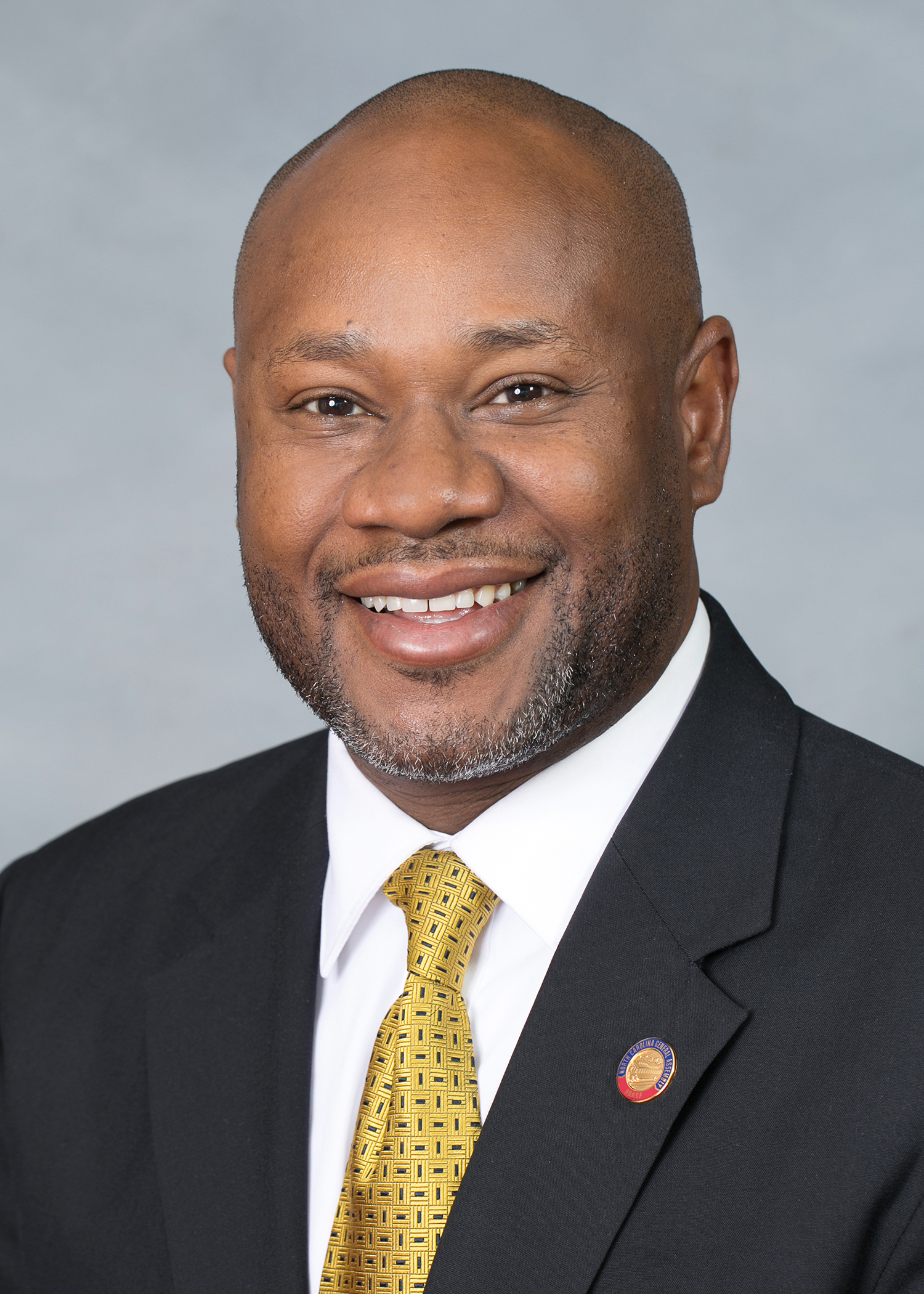
Nominee	Amos Quick
Party	Democratic
Popular vote	32,379
Percentage	100%
State Representative before election
Amos Quick
Democratic
Elected State Representative
Amos Quick
Democratic

The new 58th district includes portions of central Guilford County. It includes the home of incumbent Democrat Amos Quick, who has represented the 58th District since 2017.

North Carolina House of Representatives 58th district general election, 2024
Party	Candidate	Votes	%
Democratic	Amos Quick (incumbent)	32,379	100%
Total votes		32,379	100%
Democratic hold			

==== District 59 ====
2024 North Carolina's 59th House district election
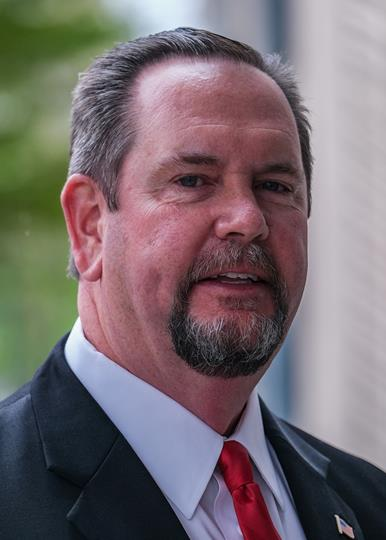

Nominee	Alan Branson	Tanneshia Dukes
Party	Republican	Democratic
Popular vote	30,609	24,859
Percentage	55.18%	44.82%
State Representative before election
Alan Branson
Republican
Elected State Representative
Alan Branson
Republican

The new 59th district includes portions of eastern Guilford County. It includes the home of incumbent Republican Alan Branson, who has represented the 59th district since 2024. Branson was appointed on April 10, 2024, following the resignation of Jon Hardister, who had previously announced his retirement on January 4, 2023, to run for Labor Commissioner.

North Carolina House of Representatives 59th district Republican primary election, 2024
Party	Candidate	Votes	%
Republican	Alan Branson	7,245	70.39%
Republican	Allen Chappell	3,047	29.61%
Total votes		10,292	100%

North Carolina House of Representatives 59th district general election, 2024
Party	Candidate	Votes	%
Republican	Alan Branson (incumbent)	30,609	55.18%
Democratic	Tanneshia Dukes	24,859	44.82%
Total votes		55,468	100%
Republican hold			

=== Districts 60-79 ===
==== District 60 ====
2024 North Carolina's 60th House district election
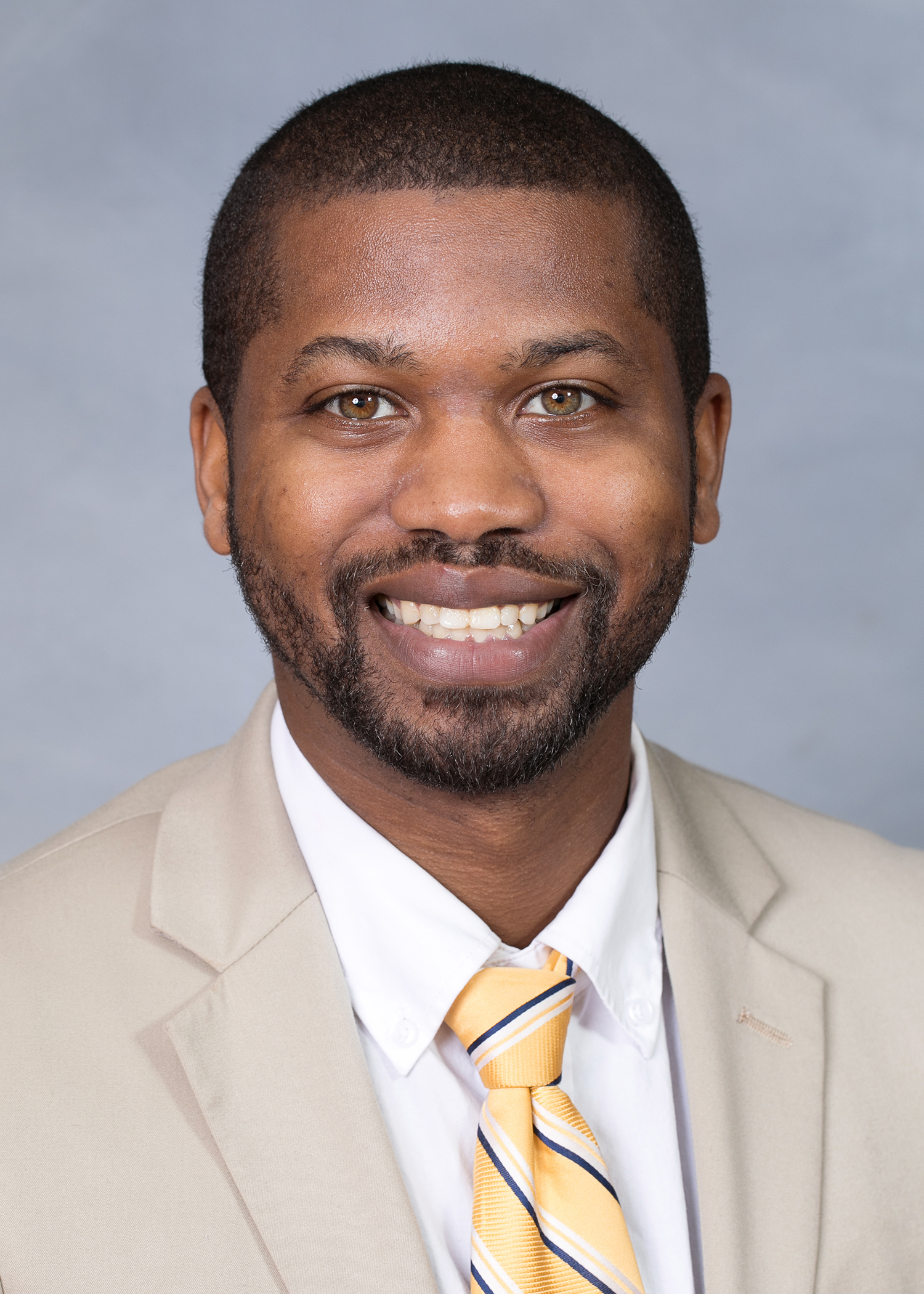

Nominee	Cecil Brockman	Joseph Perrotta
Party	Democratic	Republican
Popular vote	23,899	13,928
Percentage	63.18%	36.82%
State Representative before election
Cecil Brockman
Democratic
Elected State Representative
Cecil Brockman
Democratic

The new 60th district includes portions of southwestern Guilford County. It includes the home of incumbent Democrat Cecil Brockman, who has represented the 60th district since 2015.

North Carolina House of Representatives 60th district Democratic primary election, 2024
Party	Candidate	Votes	%
Democratic	Cecil Brockman (incumbent)	3,055	50.71%
Democratic	James Adams	2,970	49.29%
Total votes		6,025	100%

North Carolina House of Representatives 60th district general election, 2024
Party	Candidate	Votes	%
Democratic	Cecil Brockman (incumbent)	23,899	63.18%
Republican	Joseph Perrotta	13,928	36.82%
Total votes		37,827	100%
Democratic hold			

==== District 61 ====
2024 North Carolina's 61st House district election
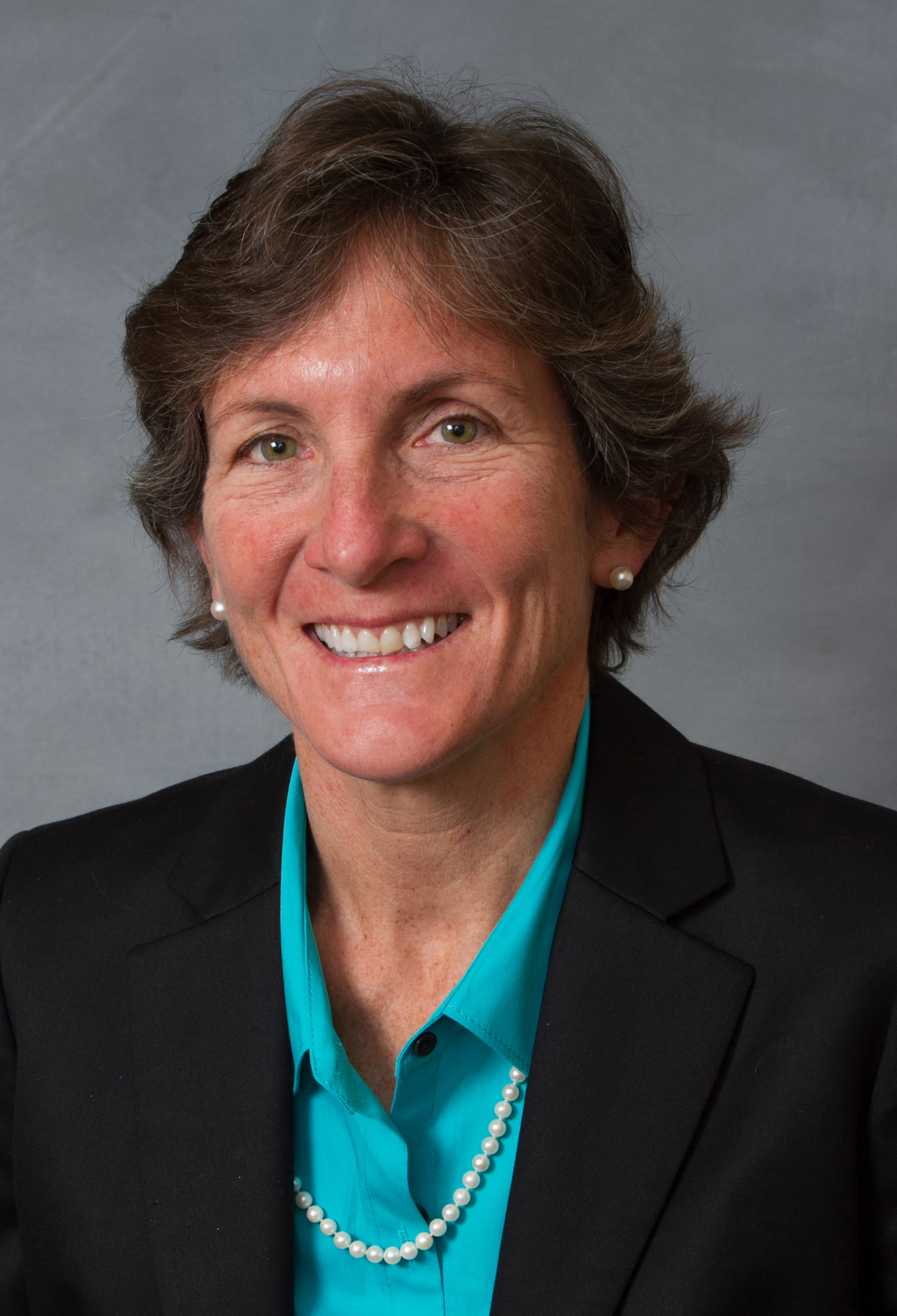

Nominee	Pricey Harrison	Crystal Davis
Party	Democratic	Republican
Popular vote	33,804	9,058
Percentage	78.87%	21.13%
State Representative before election
Pricey Harrison
Democratic
Elected State Representative
Pricey Harrison
Democratic

The new 61st district includes portions of central Guilford County. It includes the home of incumbent Democrat Pricey Harrison, who has represented the 61st district and its predecessors since 2005.

North Carolina House of Representatives 61st district general election, 2024
Party	Candidate	Votes	%
Democratic	Pricey Harrison (incumbent)	33,804	78.87%
Republican	Crystal Davis	9,058	21.13%
Total votes		42,862	100%
Democratic hold			

==== District 62 ====
2024 North Carolina's 62nd House district election
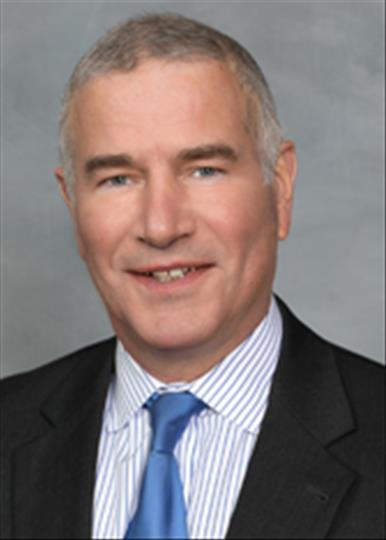

Nominee	John Blust	Marjorie Benbow
Party	Republican	Democratic
Popular vote	29,389	25,597
Percentage	53.45%	46.55%
State Representative before election
John Blust
Republican
Elected State Representative
John Blust
Republican

The new 62nd district includes portions of northwestern Guilford County. It includes the home of incumbent Republican John Faircloth, who has represented the 62nd district and its predecessors since 2011. On October 31, 2023, Faircloth announced his intent to retire after seven terms. Faircloth resigned his seat on September 6, 2024 and Republican nominee and former Representative John Blust was appointed to the seat on September 17, 2024.

North Carolina House of Representatives 62nd district Republican primary election, 2024
Party	Candidate	Votes	%
Republican	John Blust	3,971	34.10%
Republican	Britt Moore	2,299	19.74%
Republican	Michelle Bardsley	2,209	18.97%
Republican	Ann Schneider	1,942	16.68%
Republican	Jaxon Barber	1,223	10.50%
Total votes		11,644	100%

North Carolina House of Representatives 62nd district general election, 2024
Party	Candidate	Votes	%
Republican	John Blust (incumbent)	29,389	53.45%
Democratic	Marjorie Benbow	25,597	46.55%
Total votes		54,986	100%
Republican hold			

==== District 63 ====
2024 North Carolina's 63rd House district election
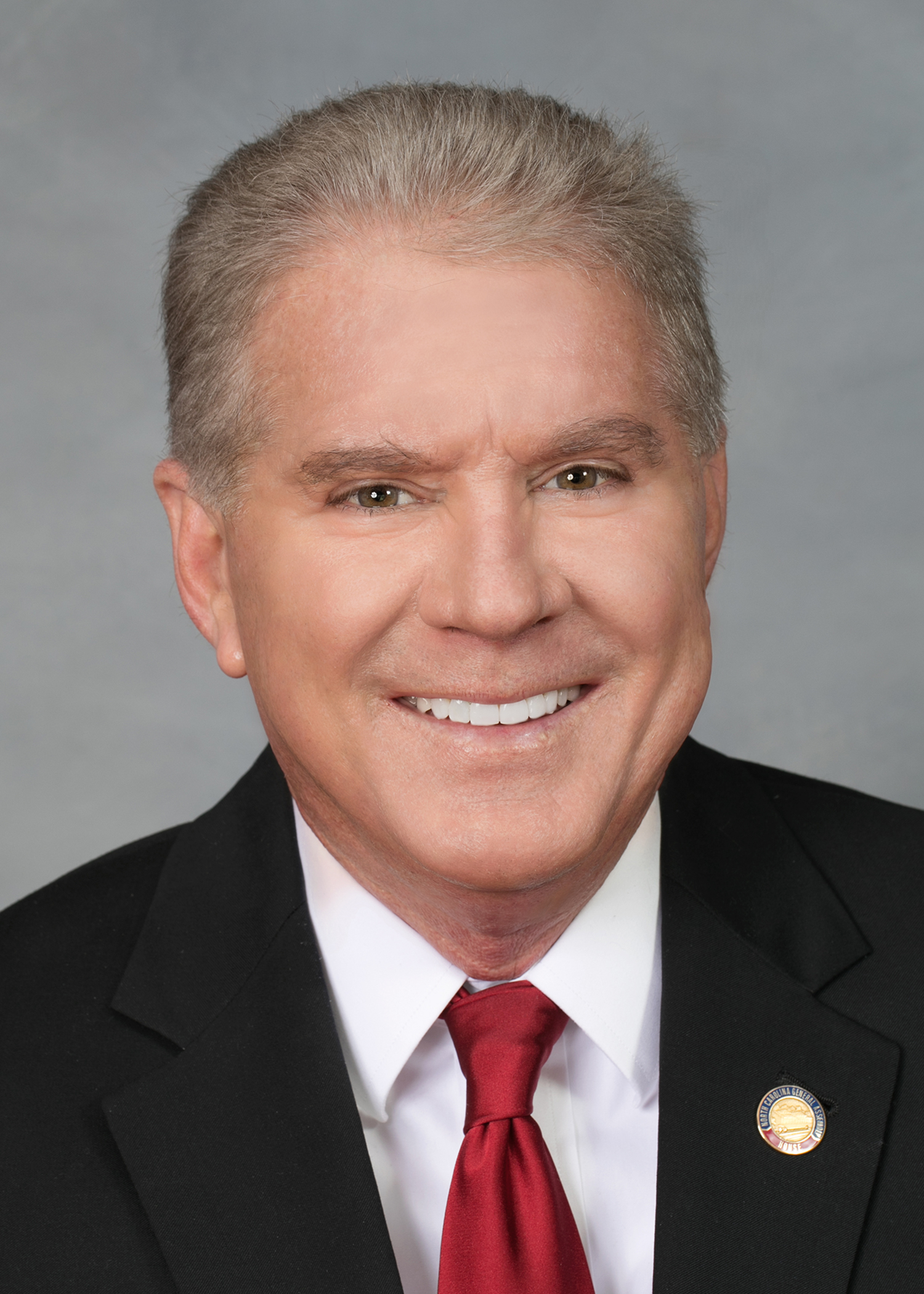

Nominee	Stephen Ross	Robin Wintringham
Party	Republican	Democratic
Popular vote	23,812	19,460
Percentage	55.03%	44.97%
State Representative before election
Stephen Ross
Republican
Elected State Representative
Stephen Ross
Republican

The new 63rd district includes portions of northern Alamance County. It includes the home of incumbent Republican Stephen Ross, who has represented the 63rd district since 2023.

North Carolina House of Representatives 63rd District general election, 2024
Party	Candidate	Votes	%
Republican	Stephen Ross (incumbent)	23,812	55.03%
Democratic	Robin Wintringham	19,460	44.97%
Total votes		43,272	100%
Republican hold			

==== District 64 ====
2024 North Carolina's 64th House district election
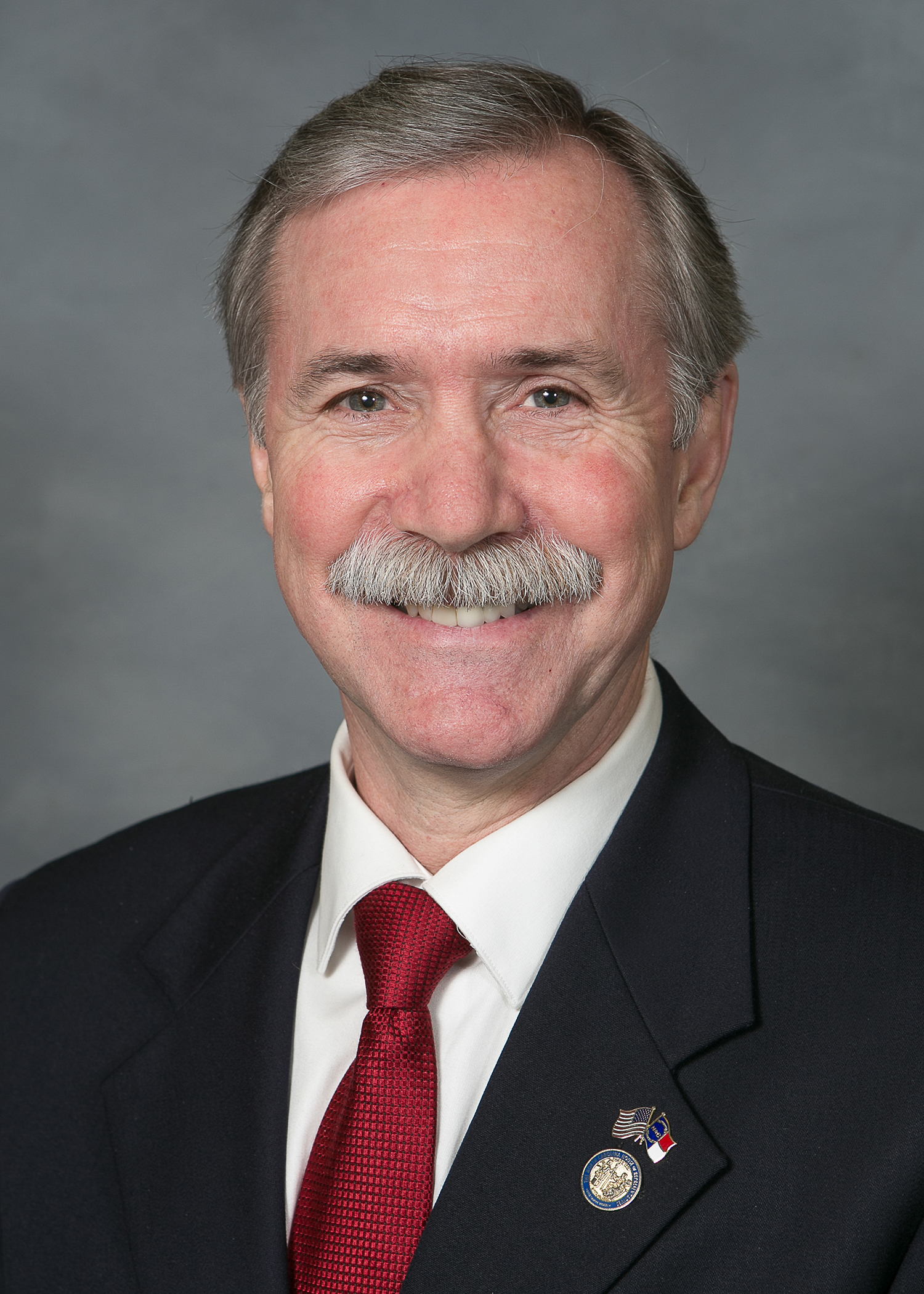

Nominee	Dennis Riddell	LeVon Barnes
Party	Republican	Democratic
Popular vote	24,541	20,212
Percentage	54.84%	45.16%
State Representative before election
Dennis Riddell
Republican
Elected State Representative
Dennis Riddell
Republican

The new 64th district includes portions of southern Alamance County. It includes the home of incumbent Republican Dennis Riddell, who has represented the 64th district since 2013.

North Carolina House of Representatives 64th district general election, 2024
Party	Candidate	Votes	%
Republican	Dennis Riddell (incumbent)	24,541	54.84%
Democratic	LeVon Barnes	20,212	45.16%
Total votes		44,753	100%
Republican hold			

==== District 65 ====
2024 North Carolina's 65th House district election
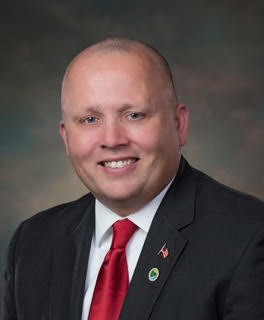
Nominee	Reece Pyrtle
Party	Republican
Popular vote	37,457
Percentage	100%
State Representative before election
Reece Pyrtle
Republican
Elected State Representative
Reece Pyrtle
Republican

The new 65th district includes all of Rockingham County. It includes the home of incumbent Republican Reece Pyrtle, who has represented the 65th district since 2021.

North Carolina House of Representatives 65th district Republican primary election, 2024
Party	Candidate	Votes	%
Republican	Reece Pyrtle (incumbent)	9,850	80.41%
Republican	Joseph Gibson III	2,399	19.59%
Total votes		12,249	100%

North Carolina House of Representatives 65th district general election, 2024
Party	Candidate	Votes	%
Republican	Reece Pyrtle (incumbent)	37,457	100%
Total votes		37,457	100%
Republican hold			

==== District 66 ====
2024 North Carolina's 66th House district election
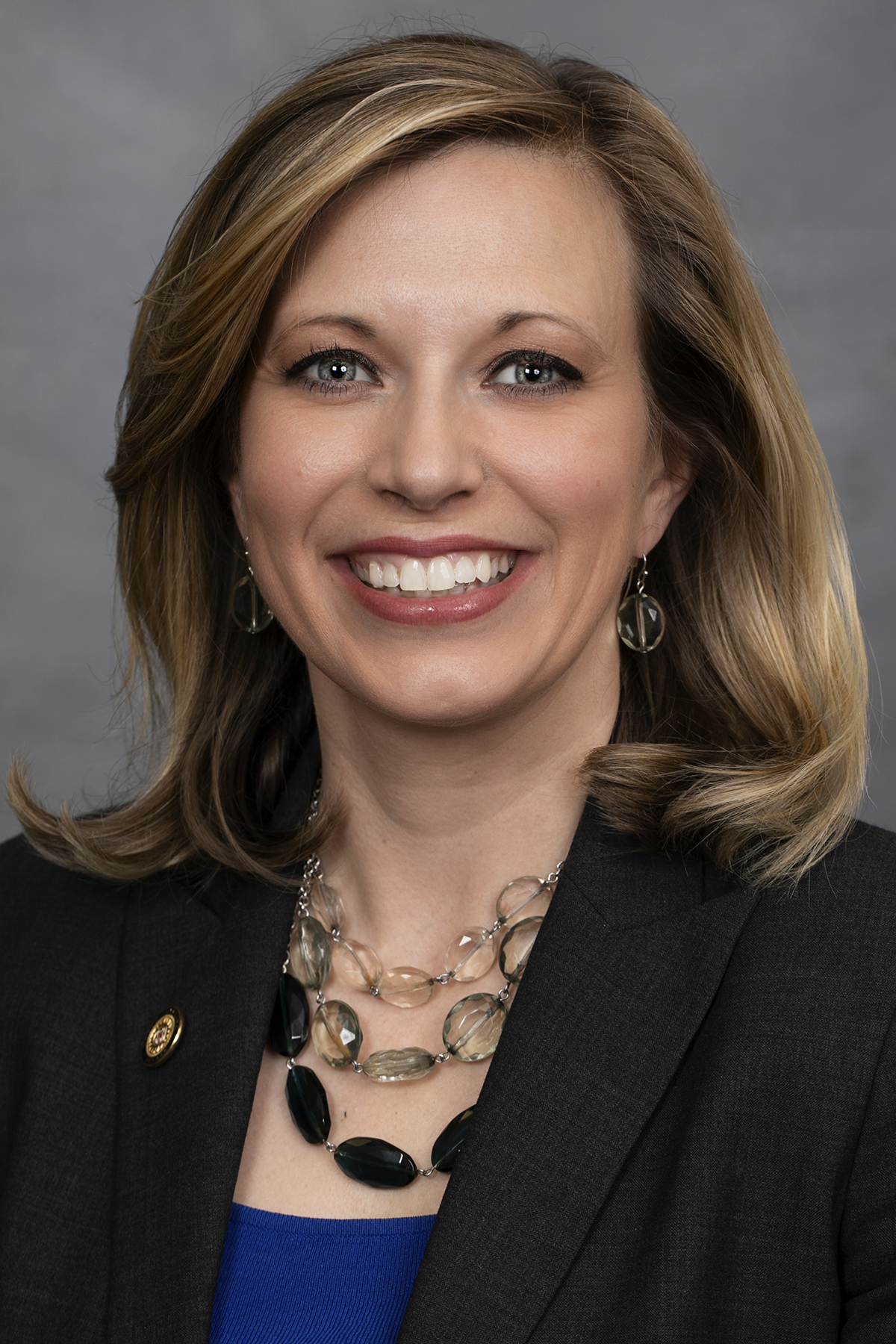

Nominee	Sarah Crawford	Michael Nelson
Party	Democratic	Libertarian
Popular vote	33,224	11,161
Percentage	74.85%	25.15%
State Representative before election
Sarah Crawford
Democratic
Elected State Representative
Sarah Crawford
Democratic

The new 66th district includes portions of northern Wake County. It includes the home of incumbent Democrat Sarah Crawford, who has represented the 66th district since 2023.

North Carolina House of Representatives 66th district general election, 2024
Party	Candidate	Votes	%
Democratic	Sarah Crawford (incumbent)	33,224	74.85%
Libertarian	Michael Nelson	11,161	25.15%
Total votes		44,385	100%
Democratic hold			

==== District 67 ====
2024 North Carolina's 67th House district election
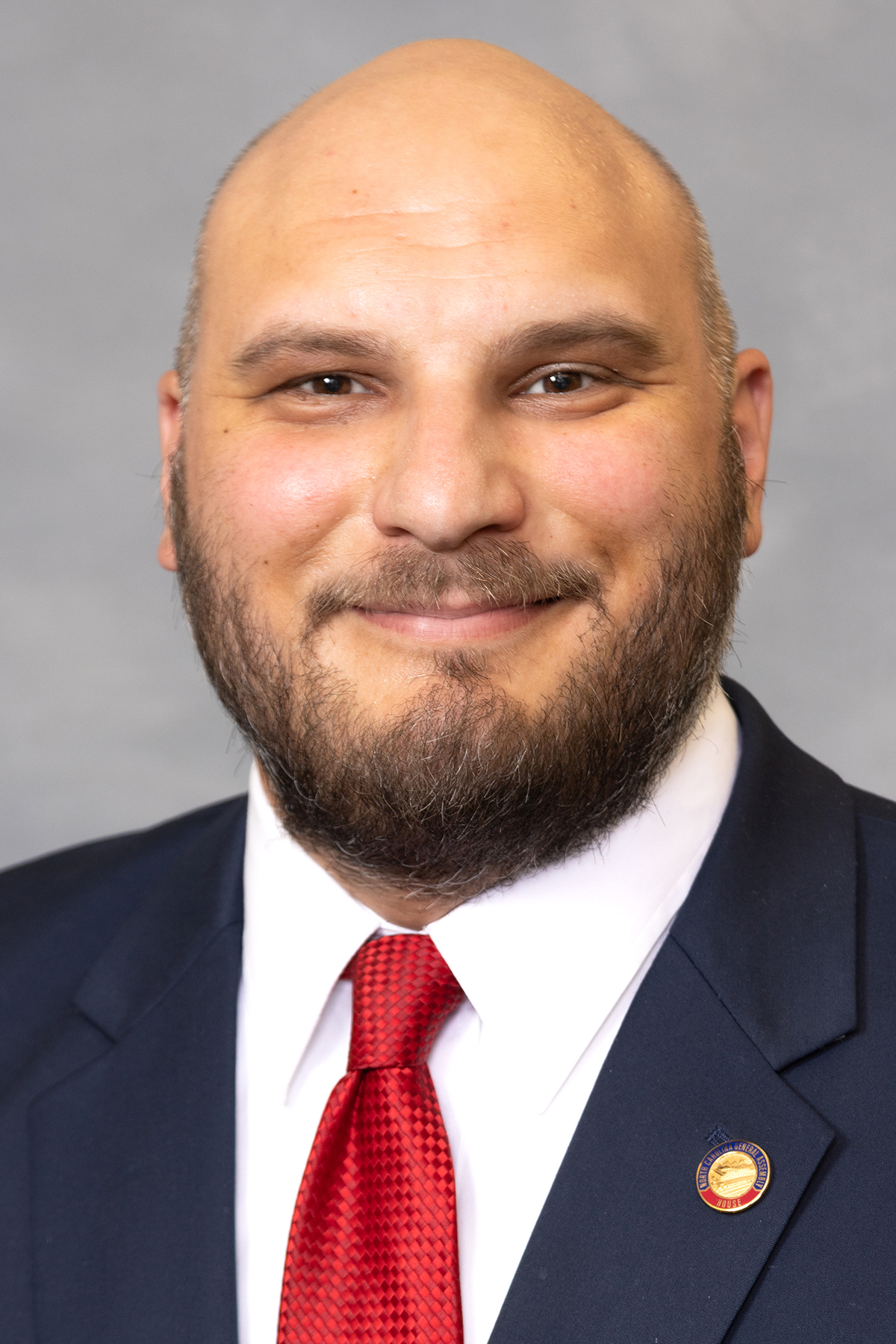

Nominee	Cody Huneycutt	Daniel Quick
Party	Republican	Democratic
Popular vote	36,358	12,099
Percentage	75.03%	24.97%
State Representative before election
Wayne Sasser
Republican
Elected State Representative
Cody Huneycutt
Republican

The new 67th district includes all of Montgomery and Stanly counties. It includes the home of incumbent Republican Wayne Sasser, who has represented the 67th district since 2019. Sasser has announced he is retiring after three terms.

North Carolina House of Representatives 67th district Republican primary election, 2024
Party	Candidate	Votes	%
Republican	Cody Huneycutt	9,140	64.74%
Republican	Brandon King	4,978	35.26%
Total votes		14,118	100%

North Carolina House of Representatives 67th district general election, 2024
Party	Candidate	Votes	%
Republican	Cody Huneycutt	36,358	75.03%
Democratic	Daniel Quick	12,099	24.97%
Total votes		48,457	100%
Republican hold			

==== District 68 ====
2024 North Carolina's 68th House district election
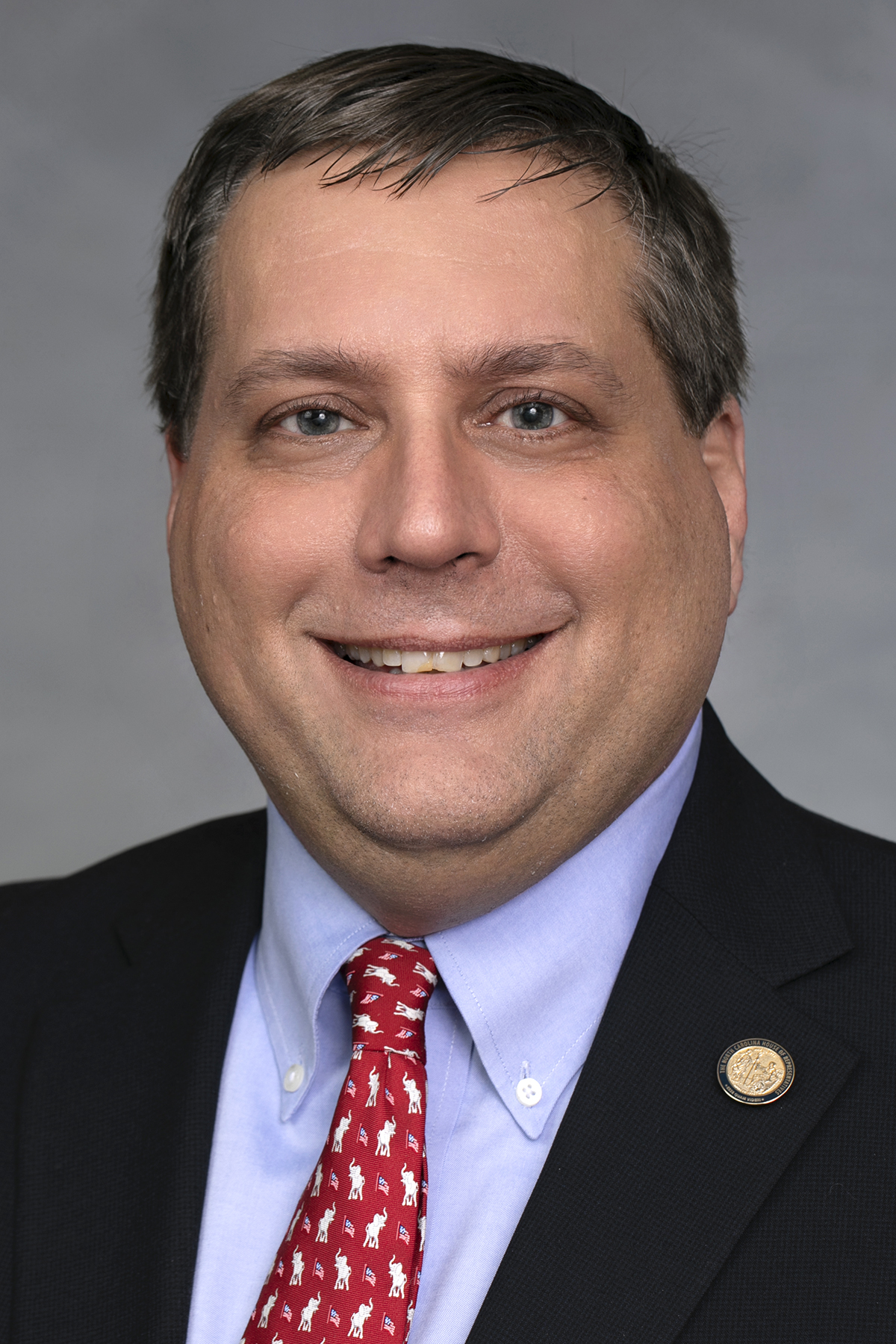

Nominee	David Willis	Cristal Robinson
Party	Republican	Democratic
Popular vote	33,807	20,290
Percentage	62.49%	37.51%
State Representative before election
David Willis
Republican
Elected State Representative
David Willis
Republican

The new 68th district includes portions of southwestern Union County. It includes the home of incumbent Republican David Willis, who has represented the 68th district since 2021.

North Carolina House of Representatives 68th district general election, 2024
Party	Candidate	Votes	%
Republican	David Willis (incumbent)	33,807	62.49%
Democratic	Cristal Robinson	20,290	37.51%
Total votes		54,097	100%
Republican hold			

==== District 69 ====
2024 North Carolina's 69th House district election
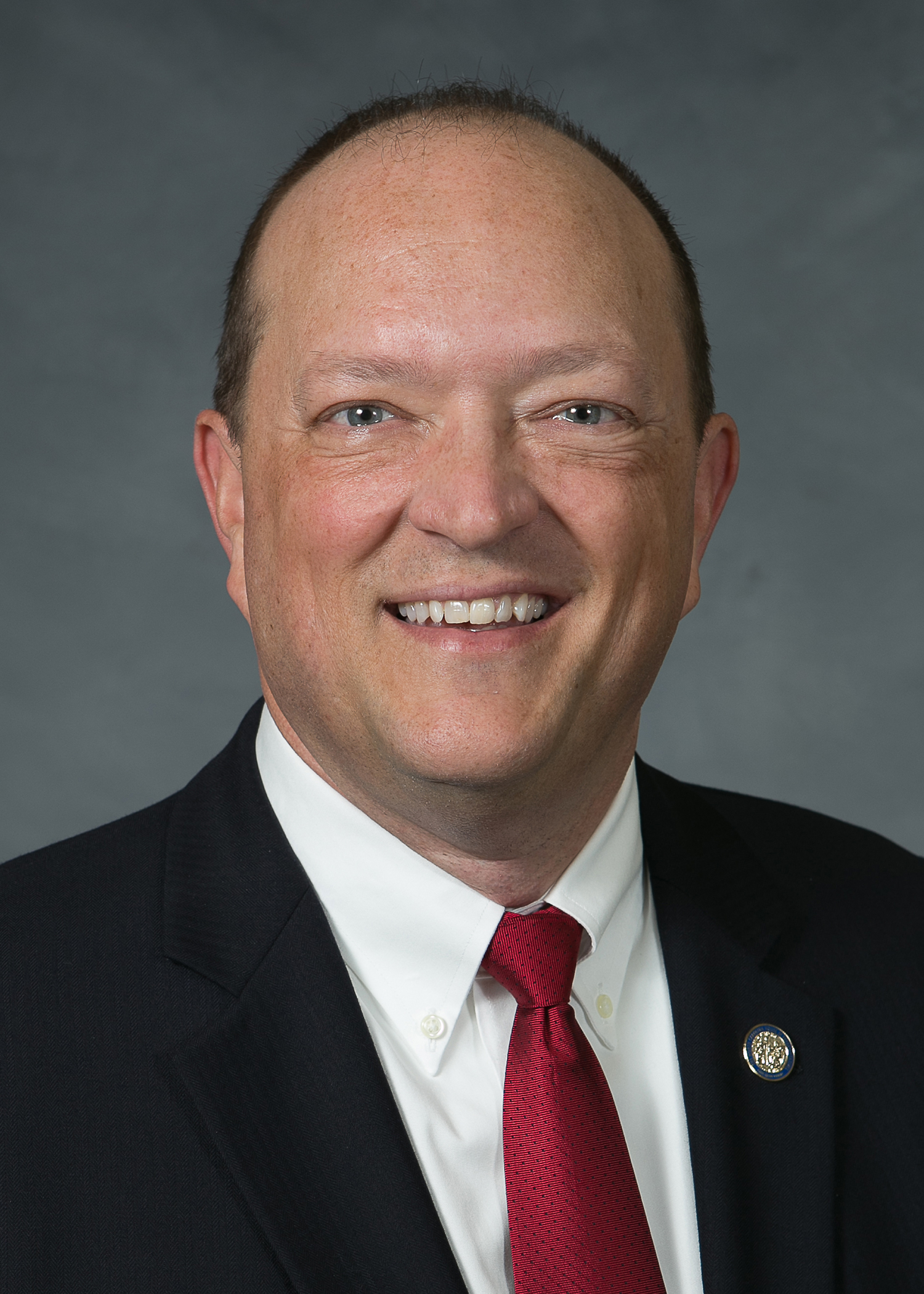

Nominee	Dean Arp	Leigh Coulter
Party	Republican	Democratic
Popular vote	32,796	19,091
Percentage	63.21%	36.79%
State Representative before election
Dean Arp
Republican
Elected State Representative
Dean Arp
Republican

The new 69th district includes portions of northwestern Union County. It includes the home of incumbent Republican Dean Arp, who has represented the 69th district since 2013.

North Carolina House of Representatives 69th district Republican primary election, 2024
Party	Candidate	Votes	%
Republican	Dean Arp (incumbent)	8,041	80.74%
Republican	Clint Cannaday	1,918	19.26%
Total votes		9,959	100%

North Carolina House of Representatives 69th district general election, 2024
Party	Candidate	Votes	%
Republican	Dean Arp (incumbent)	32,796	63.21%
Democratic	Leigh Coulter	19,091	36.79%
Total votes		51,887	100%
Republican hold			

==== District 70 ====
2024 North Carolina's 70th House district election
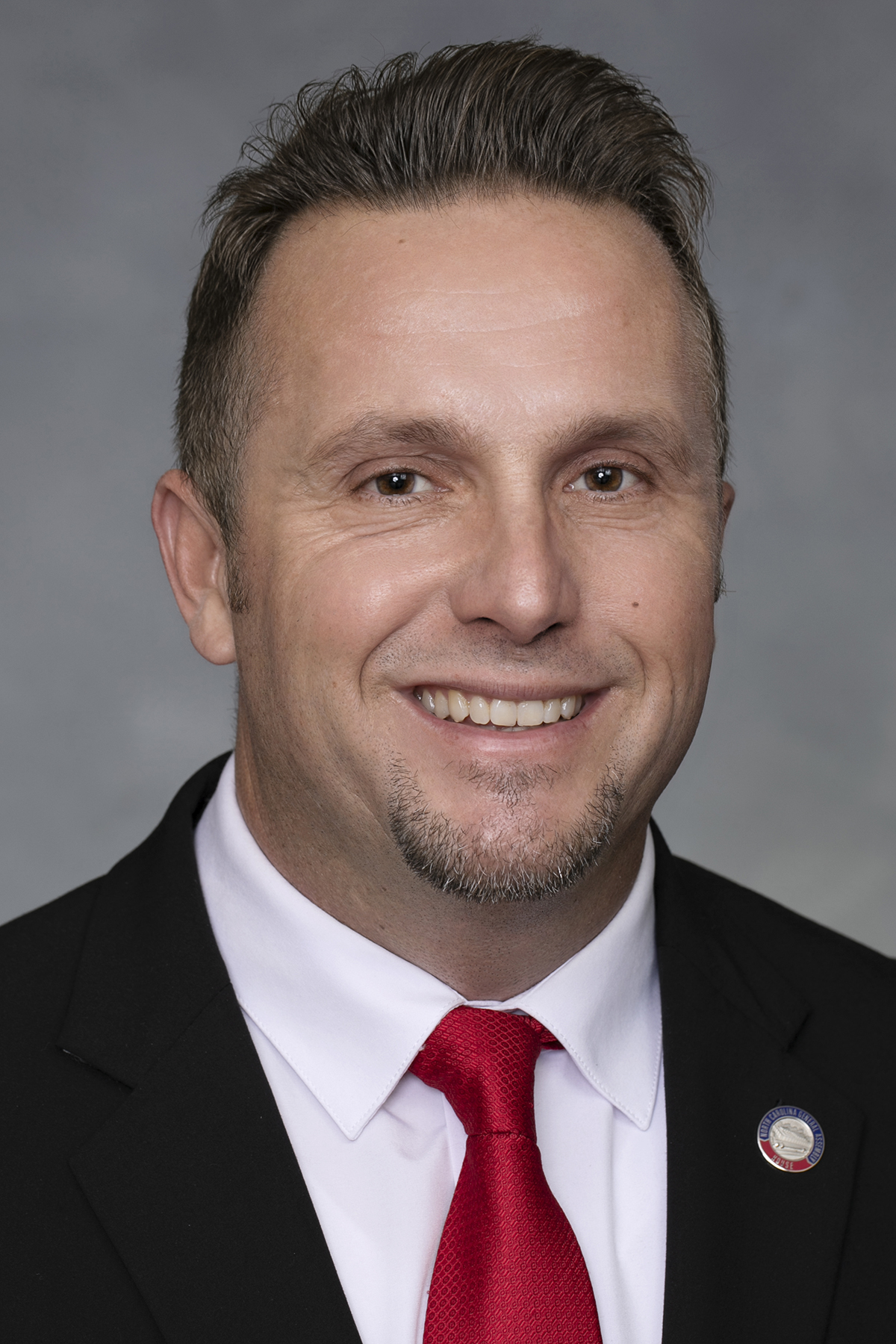

Nominee	Brian Biggs	Susie Scott
Party	Republican	Democratic
Popular vote	33,617	10,520
Percentage	76.17%	23.83%
State Representative before election
Brian Biggs
Republican
Elected State Representative
Brian Biggs
Republican

The new 70th district includes portions of northwestern Randolph County. It includes the home of incumbent Republican Brian Biggs, who has represented the 70th district since 2023.

North Carolina House of Representatives 70th district general election, 2024
Party	Candidate	Votes	%
Republican	Brian Biggs (incumbent)	33,617	76.17%
Democratic	Susan Lee "Susie" Scott	10,520	23.83%
Total votes		44,137	100%
Republican hold			

==== District 71 ====
2024 North Carolina's 71st House district election
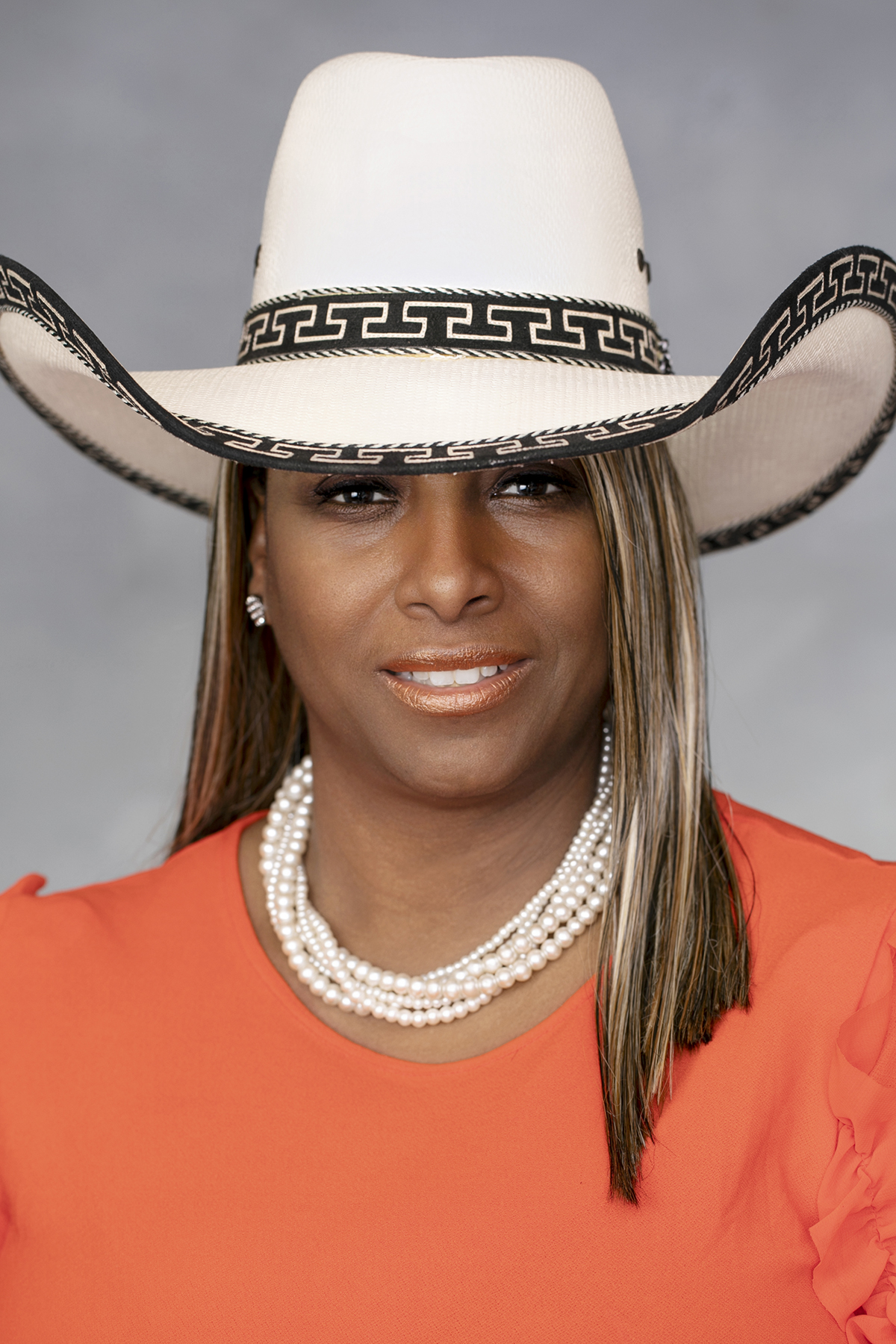
Nominee	Kanika Brown
Party	Democratic
Popular vote	31,755
Percentage	100%
State Representative before election
Kanika Brown
Democratic
Elected State Representative
Kanika Brown
Democratic

The new 71st district includes portions of southern Forsyth County. It includes the home of incumbent Democrat Kanika Brown, who has represented the 71st district since 2023.

North Carolina House of Representatives 71st district general election, 2024
Party	Candidate	Votes	%
Democratic	Kanika Brown (incumbent)	31,755	100%
Total votes		31,755	100%
Democratic hold			

==== District 72 ====
2024 North Carolina's 72nd House district election
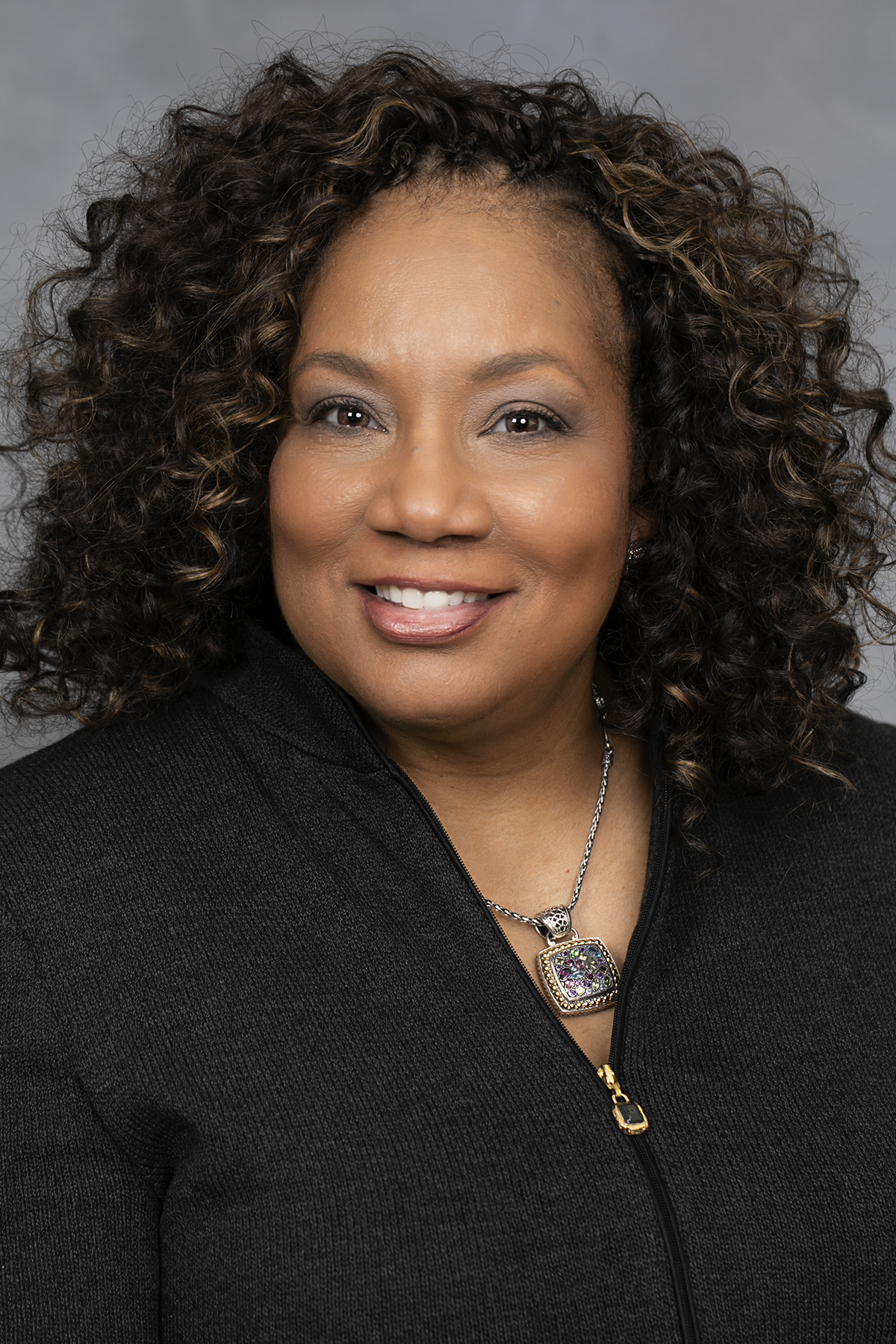
Nominee	Amber Baker
Party	Democratic
Popular vote	31,479
Percentage	100%
State Representative before election
Amber Baker
Democratic
Elected State Representative
Amber Baker
Democratic

The new 72nd district includes portions of central Forsyth County. It includes the home of incumbent Democrat Amber Baker, who has represented the 72nd district since 2021.

North Carolina House of Representatives 72nd district Democratic primary election, 2024
Party	Candidate	Votes	%
Democratic	Amber Baker (incumbent)	6,052	76.18%
Democratic	Marcus Pearson	1,892	23.82%
Total votes		7,944	100%

North Carolina House of Representatives 72nd district general election, 2024
Party	Candidate	Votes	%
Democratic	Amber Baker (incumbent)	31,479	100%
Total votes		31,479	100%
Democratic hold			

==== District 73 ====
2024 North Carolina's 73rd House district election
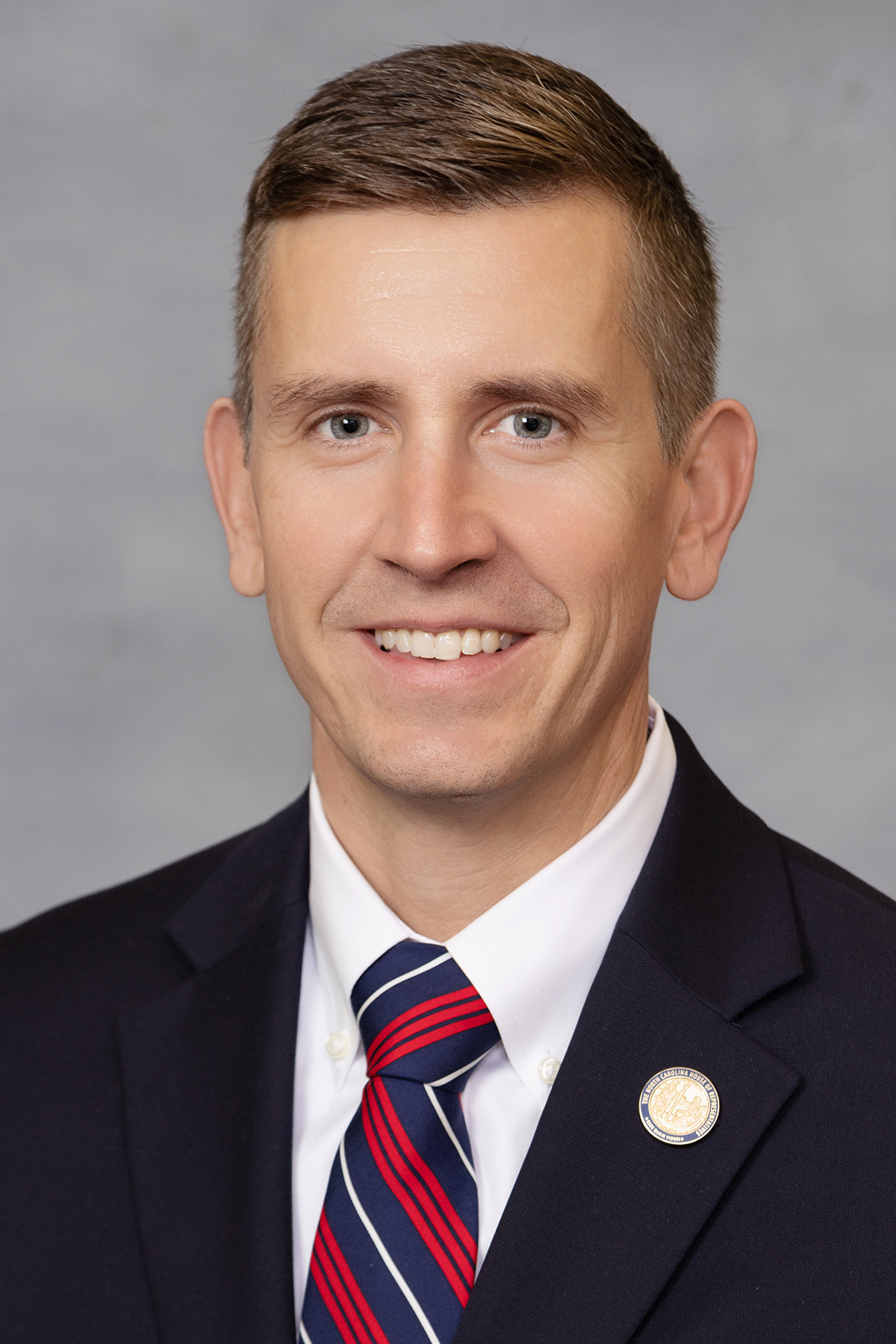

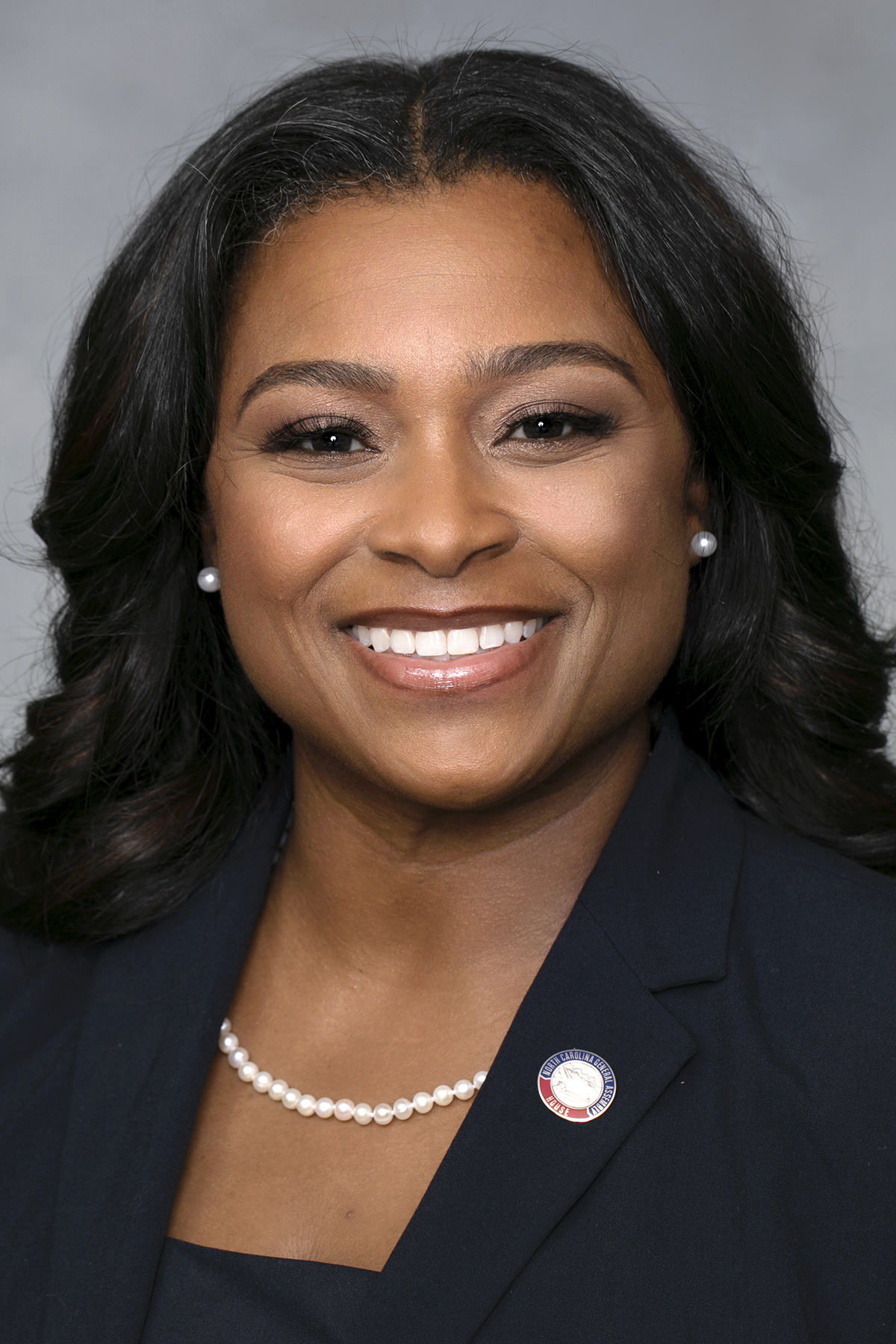
Nominee	Jonathan Almond	Diamond Staton-Williams
Party	Republican	Democratic
Popular vote	23,400	20,577
Percentage	53.21%	46.79%
State Representative before election
Diamond Staton-Williams
Democratic
Kristin Baker
Republican
Elected State Representative
Jonathan Almond
Republican

The new 73rd district includes portions of northern Cabarrus County. It includes the homes of incumbent Democrat Diamond Staton-Williams, who has represented the 73rd district since 2023, and incumbent Republican Kristin Baker, who has represented the 82nd district since 2020. On October 9, 2023, Baker announced her intent to retire after two terms in office.

North Carolina House of Representatives 73rd district Republican primary election, 2024
Party	Candidate	Votes	%
Republican	Jonathan Almond	4,526	53.46%
Republican	Holly Edwards	3,940	46.54%
Total votes		8,466	100%

North Carolina House of Representatives 73rd district general election, 2024
Party	Candidate	Votes	%
Republican	Jonathan Almond	23,400	53.21%
Democratic	Diamond Staton-Williams (incumbent)	20,577	46.79%
Total votes		43,977	100%
Republican gain from Democratic			

==== District 74 ====
2024 North Carolina's 74th House district election
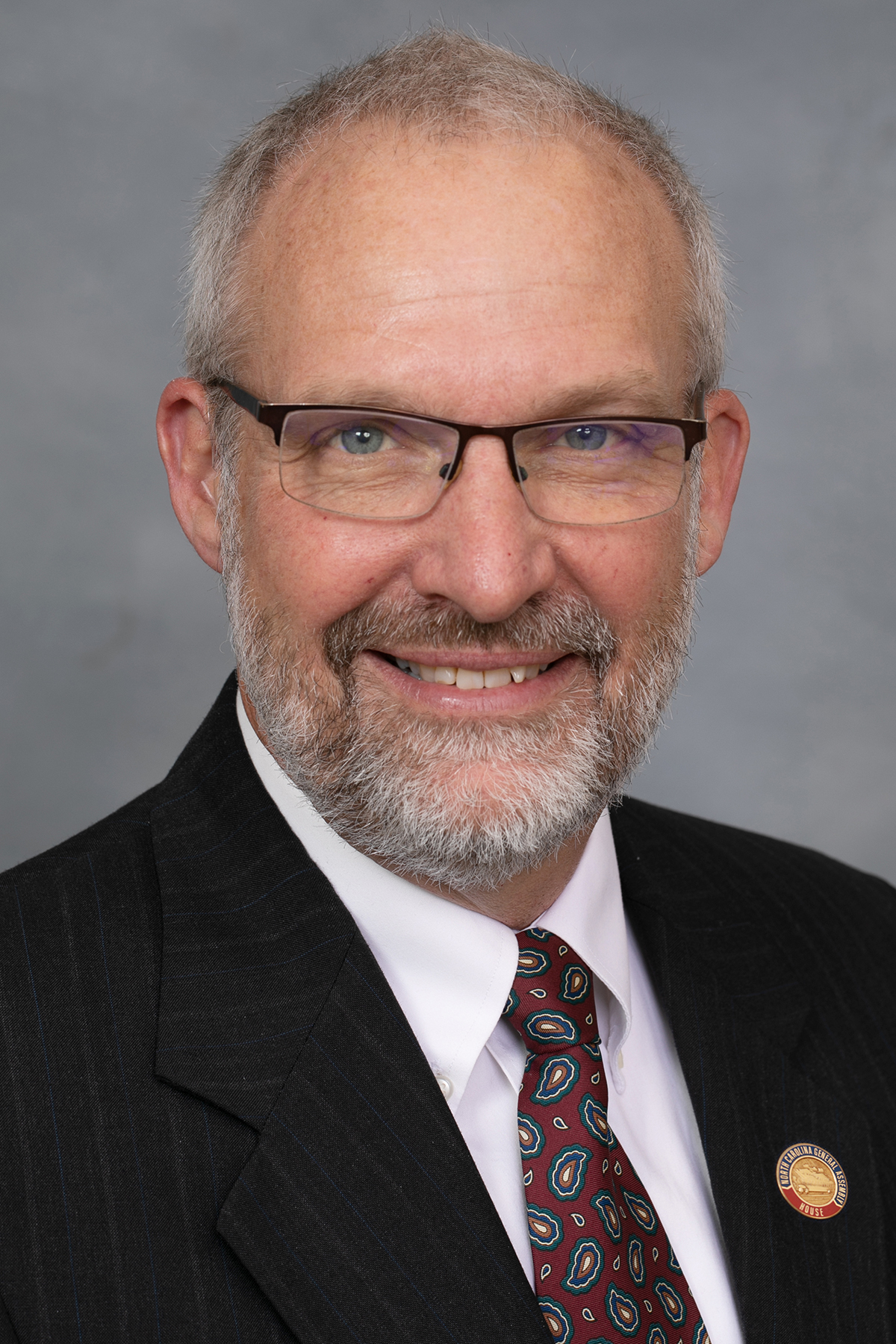

Nominee	Jeff Zenger	Amy Taylor North
Party	Republican	Democratic
Popular vote	26,908	25,015
Percentage	51.82%	48.18%
State Representative before election
Jeff Zenger
Republican
Elected State Representative
Jeff Zenger
Republican

The new 74th district includes portions of western Forsyth County. It includes the home of incumbent Republican Jeff Zenger, who has represented the 74th district since 2021.

North Carolina House of Representatives 74th district Democratic primary election, 2024
Party	Candidate	Votes	%
Democratic	Amy Taylor North	4,954	79.74%
Democratic	Mack Wilder	1,259	20.26%
Total votes		6,213	100%

North Carolina House of Representatives 74th district general election, 2024
Party	Candidate	Votes	%
Republican	Jeff Zenger (incumbent)	26,908	51.82%
Democratic	Amy Taylor North	25,015	48.18%
Total votes		51,923	100%
Republican hold			

==== District 75 ====
2024 North Carolina's 75th House district election
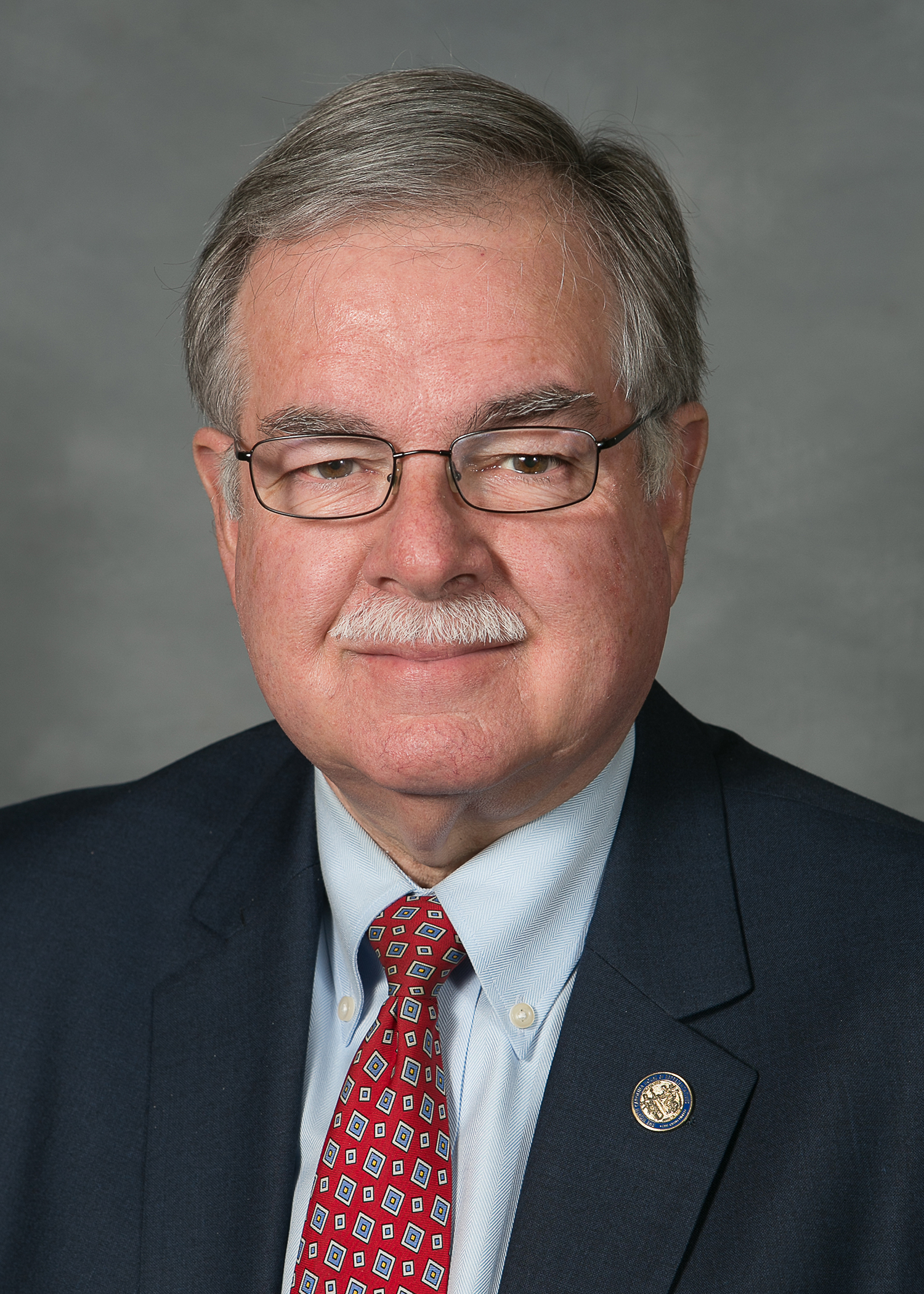

Nominee	Donny Lambeth	Caroline Warren
Party	Republican	Democratic
Popular vote	26,118	19,743
Percentage	56.95%	43.05%
State Representative before election
Donny Lambeth
Republican
Elected State Representative
Donny Lambeth
Republican

The new 75th district includes portions of eastern Forsyth County. It includes the home of incumbent Republican Donny Lambeth, who has represented the 75th district since 2013.

North Carolina House of Representatives 75th district general election, 2024
Party	Candidate	Votes	%
Republican	Donny Lambeth (incumbent)	26,118	56.95%
Democratic	Caroline Warren	19,743	43.05%
Total votes		45,861	100%
Republican hold			

==== District 76 ====
2024 North Carolina's 76th House district election
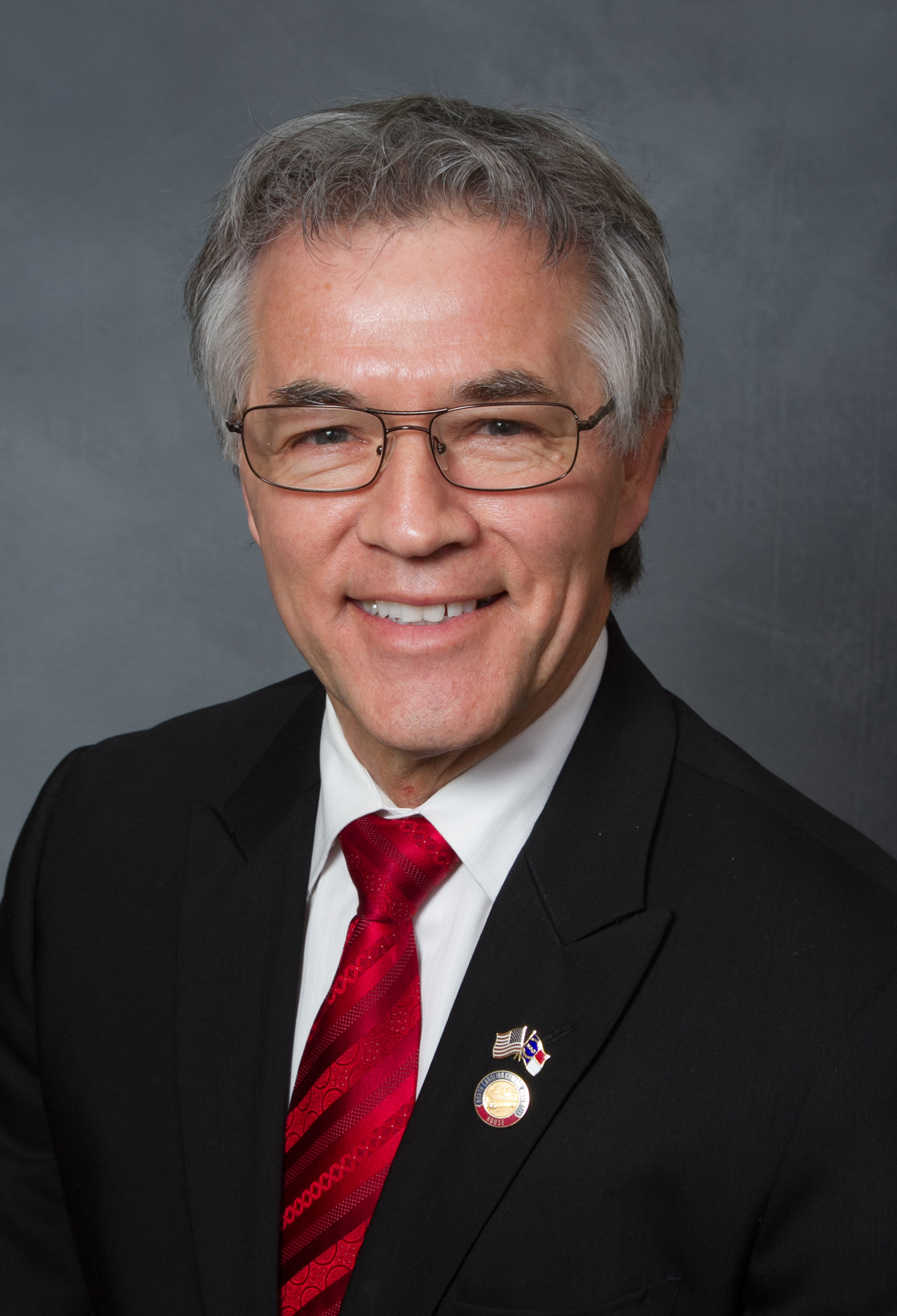

Nominee	Harry Warren	Alisha Byrd-Clark
Party	Republican	Democratic
Popular vote	27,060	16,329
Percentage	62.37%	37.63%
State Representative before election
Harry Warren
Republican
Elected State Representative
Harry Warren
Republican

The new 76th district includes portions of eastern Rowan County. It includes the home of incumbent Republican Harry Warren, who has represented the 76th district and its predecessors since 2011.

North Carolina House of Representatives 76th district general election, 2024
Party	Candidate	Votes	%
Republican	Harry Warren (incumbent)	27,060	62.37%
Democratic	Alisha Byrd-Clark	16,329	37.63%
Total votes		43,389	100%
Republican hold			

==== District 77 ====
2024 North Carolina's 77th House district election
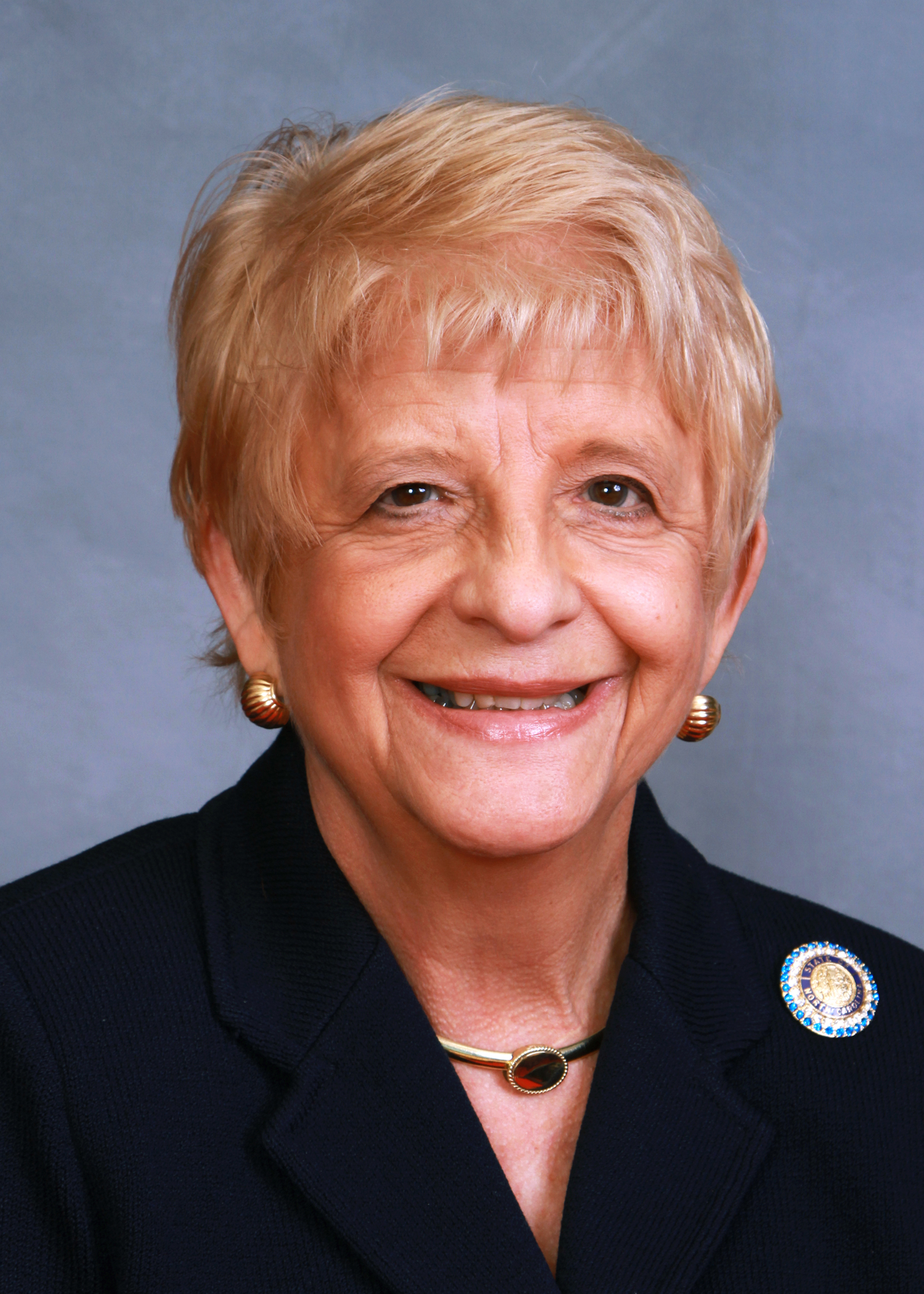

Nominee	Julia Craven Howard	Kashmir Sibby
Party	Republican	Democratic
Popular vote	41,240	10,907
Percentage	79.08%	20.92%
State Representative before election
Julia Craven Howard
Republican
Elected State Representative
Julia Craven Howard
Republican

The new 77th district includes all of Davie and Yadkin counties, as well as portions of northwestern Rowan County. It includes the home of incumbent Republican Julia Craven Howard, who has represented the 77th district and its predecessors since 1989.

North Carolina House of Representatives 77th district general election, 2024
Party	Candidate	Votes	%
Republican	Julia Craven Howard (incumbent)	41,240	79.08%
Democratic	Kashmir Sibby	10,907	20.92%
Total votes		52,147	100%
Republican hold			

==== District 78 ====
2024 North Carolina's 78th House district election
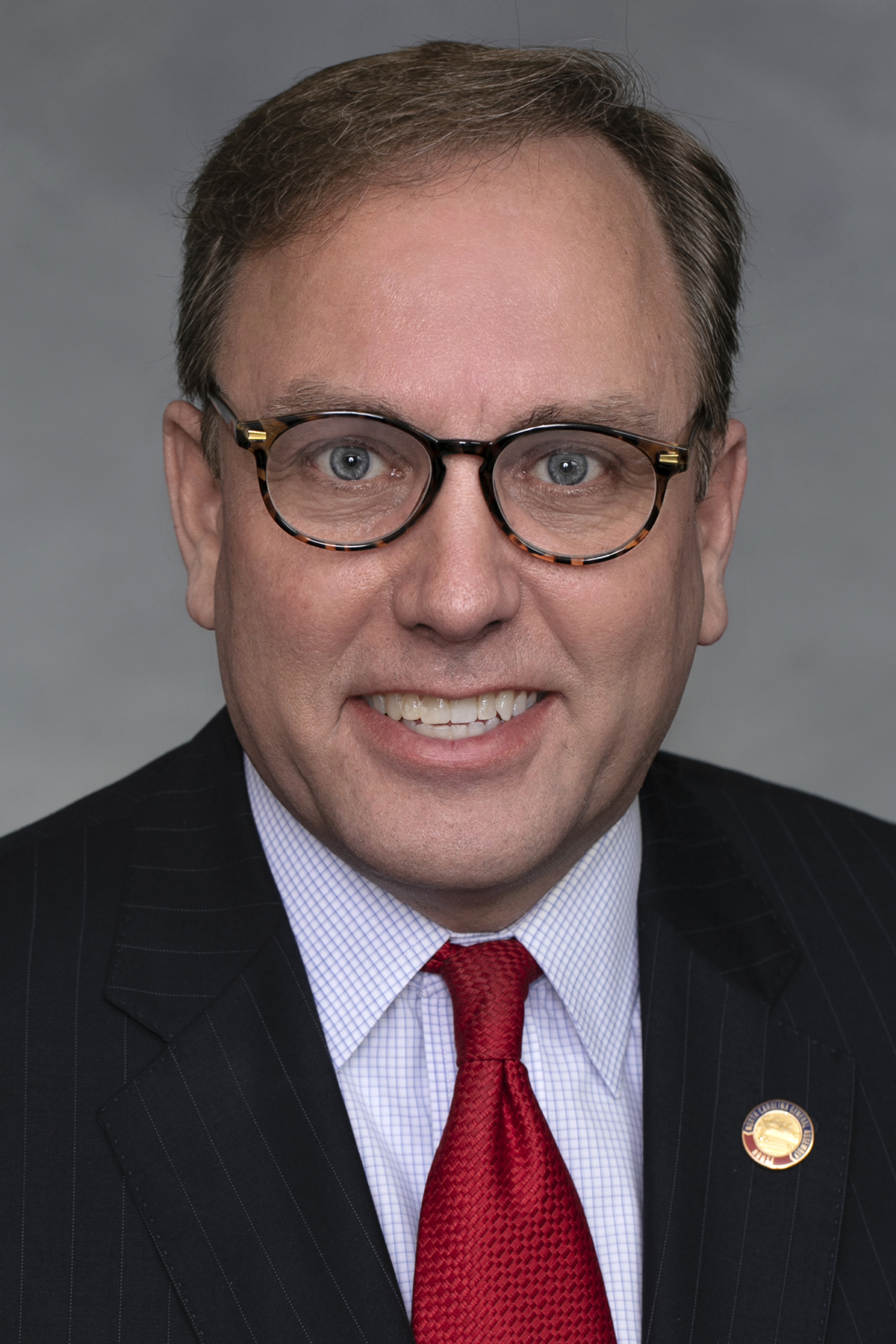

Nominee	Neal Jackson	Lowell Simon
Party	Republican	Democratic
Popular vote	38,928	11,985
Percentage	76.46%	23.54%
State Representative before election
Neal Jackson
Republican
Elected State Representative
Neal Jackson
Republican

The new 78th district includes portions of western Moore County and most of Randolph County. It includes the home of incumbent Republican Neal Jackson, who has represented the 78th district since 2023.

North Carolina House of Representatives 78th district general election, 2024
Party	Candidate	Votes	%
Republican	Neal Jackson (incumbent)	38,928	76.46%
Democratic	Lowell Simon	11,985	23.54%
Total votes		50,913	100%
Republican hold			

==== District 79 ====
2024 North Carolina's 79th House district election
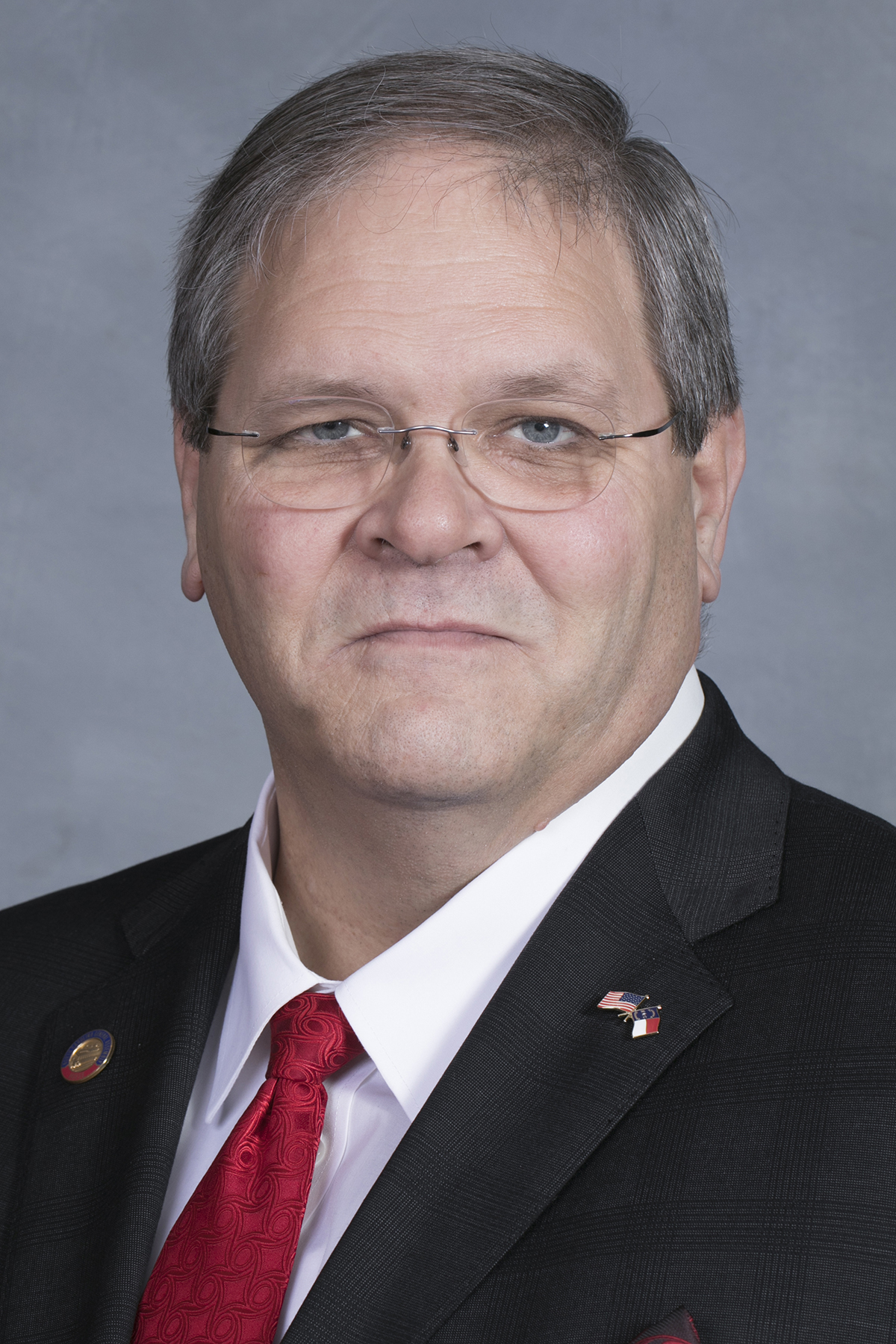

Nominee	Keith Kidwell	Mary Beedle
Party	Republican	Democratic
Popular vote	32,111	18,667
Percentage	63.24%	36.76%
State Representative before election
Keith Kidwell
Republican
Elected State Representative
Keith Kidwell
Republican

The new 79th district includes all of Beaufort, Hyde, and Pamlico counties, as well as most of Dare County. It includes the home of incumbent Republican Keith Kidwell, who has represented the 79th district since 2019.

North Carolina House of Representatives 79th district general election, 2024
Party	Candidate	Votes	%
Republican	Keith Kidwell (incumbent)	32,111	63.24%
Democratic	Mary Beedle	18,667	36.76%
Total votes		50,778	100%
Republican hold			

=== Districts 80-99 ===
==== District 80 ====
2024 North Carolina's 80th House district election
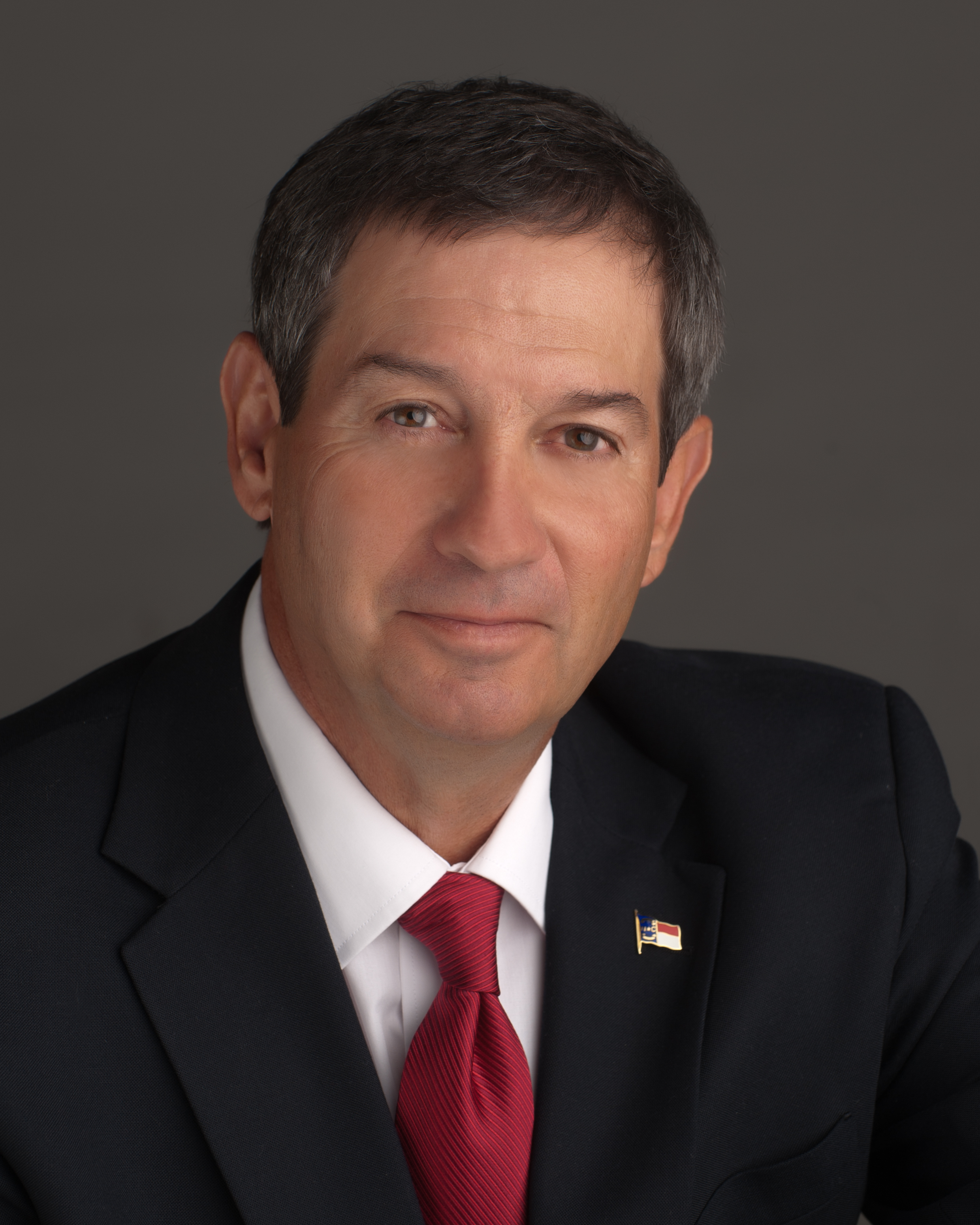

Nominee	Sam Watford	Kimberly Titlebaum
Party	Republican	Democratic
Popular vote	33,897	10,884
Percentage	75.70%	24.30%
State Representative before election
Sam Watford
Republican
Elected State Representative
Sam Watford
Republican

The new 80th district includes portions of eastern Davidson County. It includes the home of incumbent Republican Sam Watford, who has represented the 80th district since 2021.

North Carolina House of Representatives 80th district Republican primary election, 2024
Party	Candidate	Votes	%
Republican	Sam Watford (incumbent)	5,931	50.32%
Republican	Eddie Gallimore	5,855	49.68%
Total votes		11,786	100%

North Carolina House of Representatives 80th district general election, 2024
Party	Candidate	Votes	%
Republican	Sam Watford (incumbent)	33,897	75.70%
Democratic	Kimberly Titlebaum	10,884	24.30%
Total votes		44,781	100%
Republican hold			

==== District 81 ====
2024 North Carolina's 81st House district election
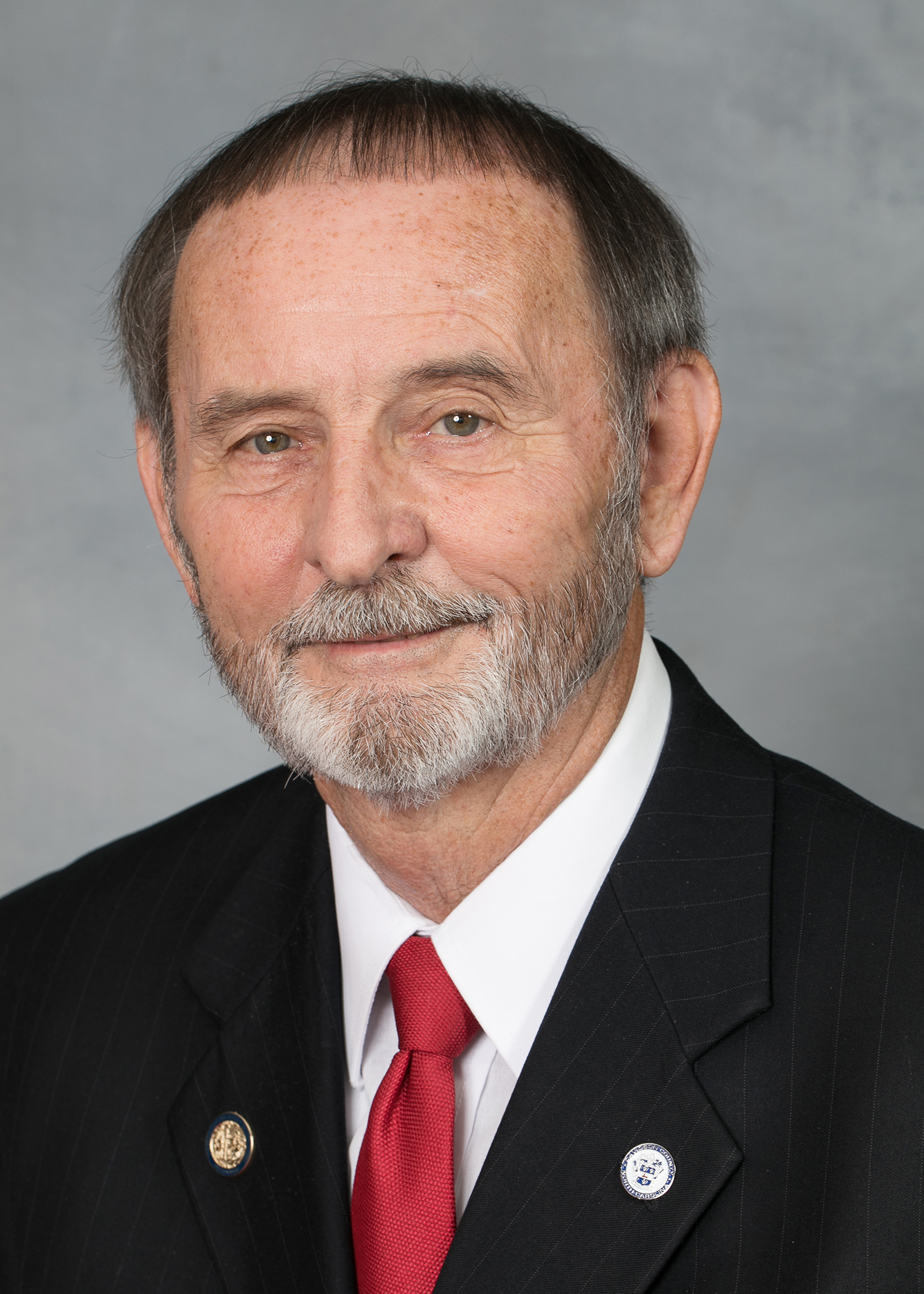

Nominee	Larry Potts	Pamela McAfee
Party	Republican	Democratic
Popular vote	33,971	13,293
Percentage	71.87%	28.13%
State Representative before election
Larry Potts
Republican
Elected State Representative
Larry Potts
Republican

The new 81st district includes portions of western Davidson County. It includes the home of incumbent Republican Larry Potts, who has represented the 81st district since 2017.

North Carolina House of Representatives 81st district general election, 2024
Party	Candidate	Votes	%
Republican	Larry Potts (incumbent)	33,971	71.87%
Democratic	Pamela McAfee	13,293	28.13%
Total votes		47,264	100%
Republican hold			

==== District 82 ====
2024 North Carolina's 82nd House district election
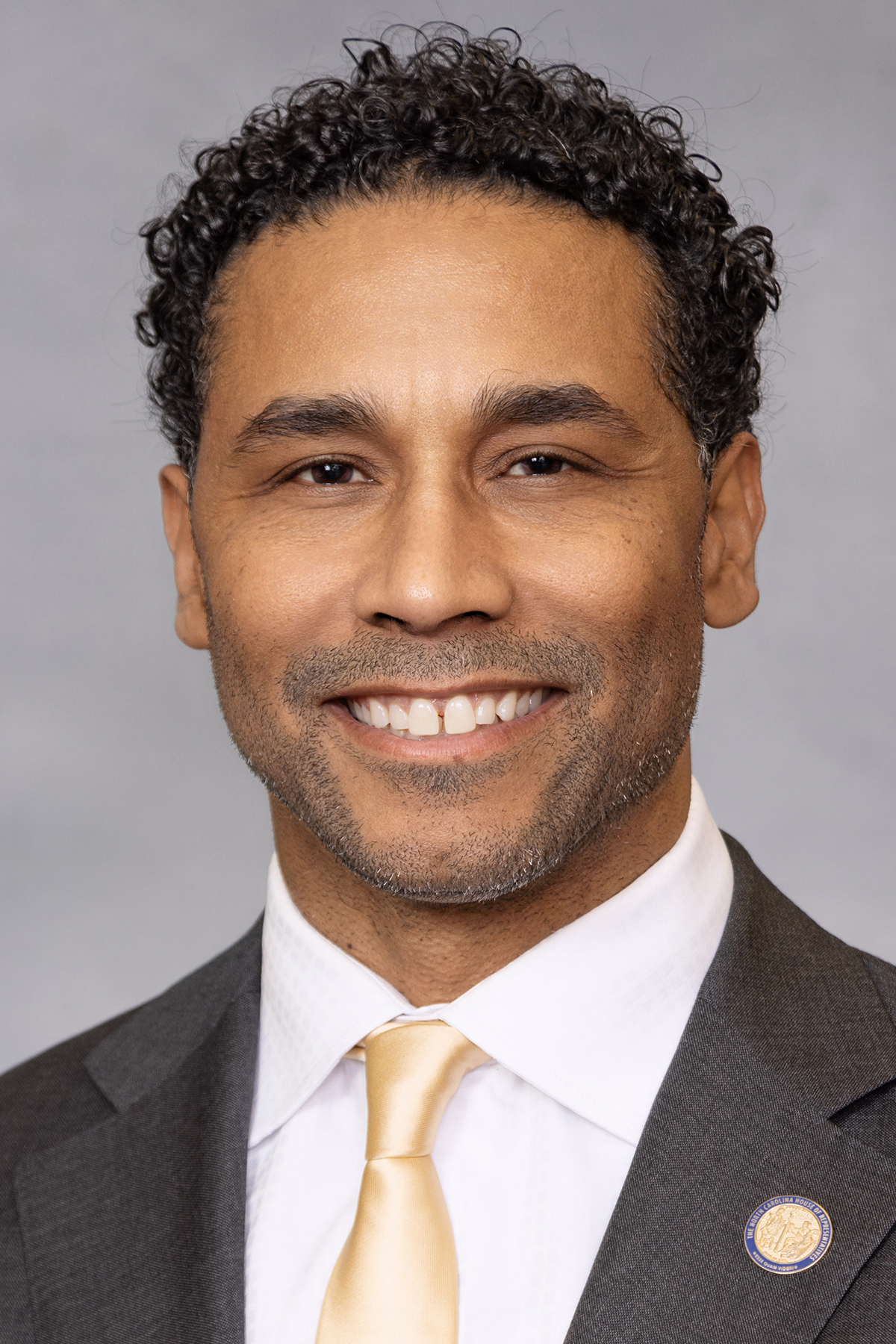

Nominee	Brian Echevarria	Sabrina Berry
Party	Republican	Democratic
Popular vote	26,965	22,649
Percentage	54.35%	45.65%
State Representative before election
Kevin Crutchfield
Republican
Elected State Representative
Brian Echevarria
Republican

The new 82nd district includes portions of southern Cabarrus County. It includes the home of incumbent Republican Kevin Crutchfield, who has represented the 83rd district since 2023.

North Carolina House of Representatives 82nd district Republican primary election, 2024
Party	Candidate	Votes	%
Republican	Brian Echevarria	4,626	50.92%
Republican	Kevin Crutchfield (incumbent)	4,459	49.08%
Total votes		9,085	100%

North Carolina House of Representatives 82nd district general election, 2024
Party	Candidate	Votes	%
Republican	Brian Echevarria	26,965	54.35%
Democratic	Sabrina Berry	22,649	45.65%
Total votes		49,614	100%
Republican hold			

==== District 83 ====
2024 North Carolina's 83rd House district election
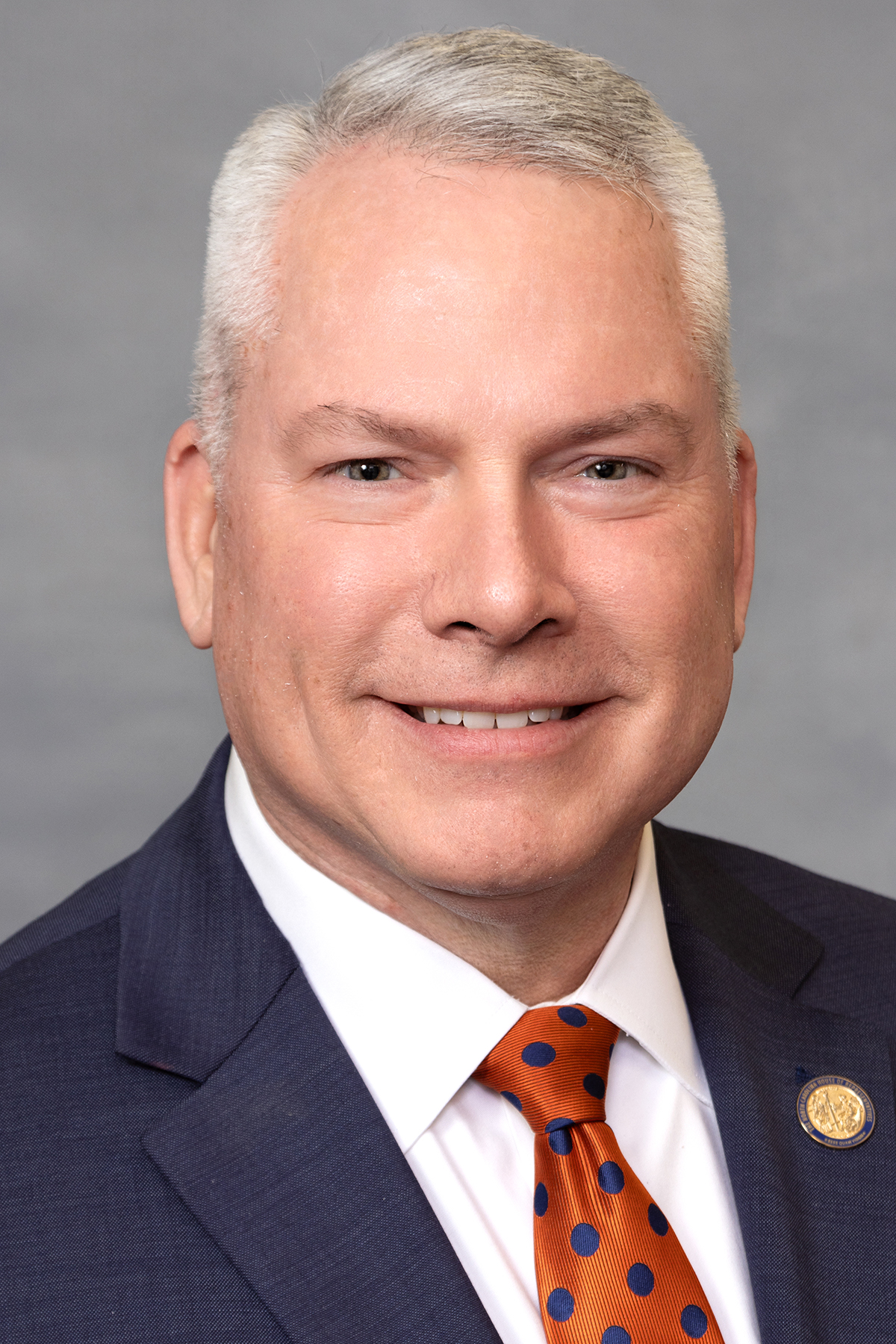

Nominee	Grant Campbell	Joanne Chesley
Party	Republican	Democratic
Popular vote	30,279	15,825
Percentage	65.68%	34.32%
State Representative before election
New Seat
Elected State Representative
Grant Campbell
Republican

The new 83rd district includes portions of northwestern Cabarrus County and southwestern Rowan County. It has no incumbent.

North Carolina House of Representatives 83rd district Republican primary election, 2024
Party	Candidate	Votes	%
Republican	Grant Campbell	5,032	52.26%
Republican	Brad Jenkins	4,597	47.74%
Total votes		9,629	100%

North Carolina House of Representatives 83rd district general election, 2024
Party	Candidate	Votes	%
Republican	Grant Campbell	30,279	65.68%
Democratic	Joanne Chesley	15,825	34.32%
Total votes		46,104	100%
Republican win (new seat)			

==== District 84 ====
2024 North Carolina's 84th House district election
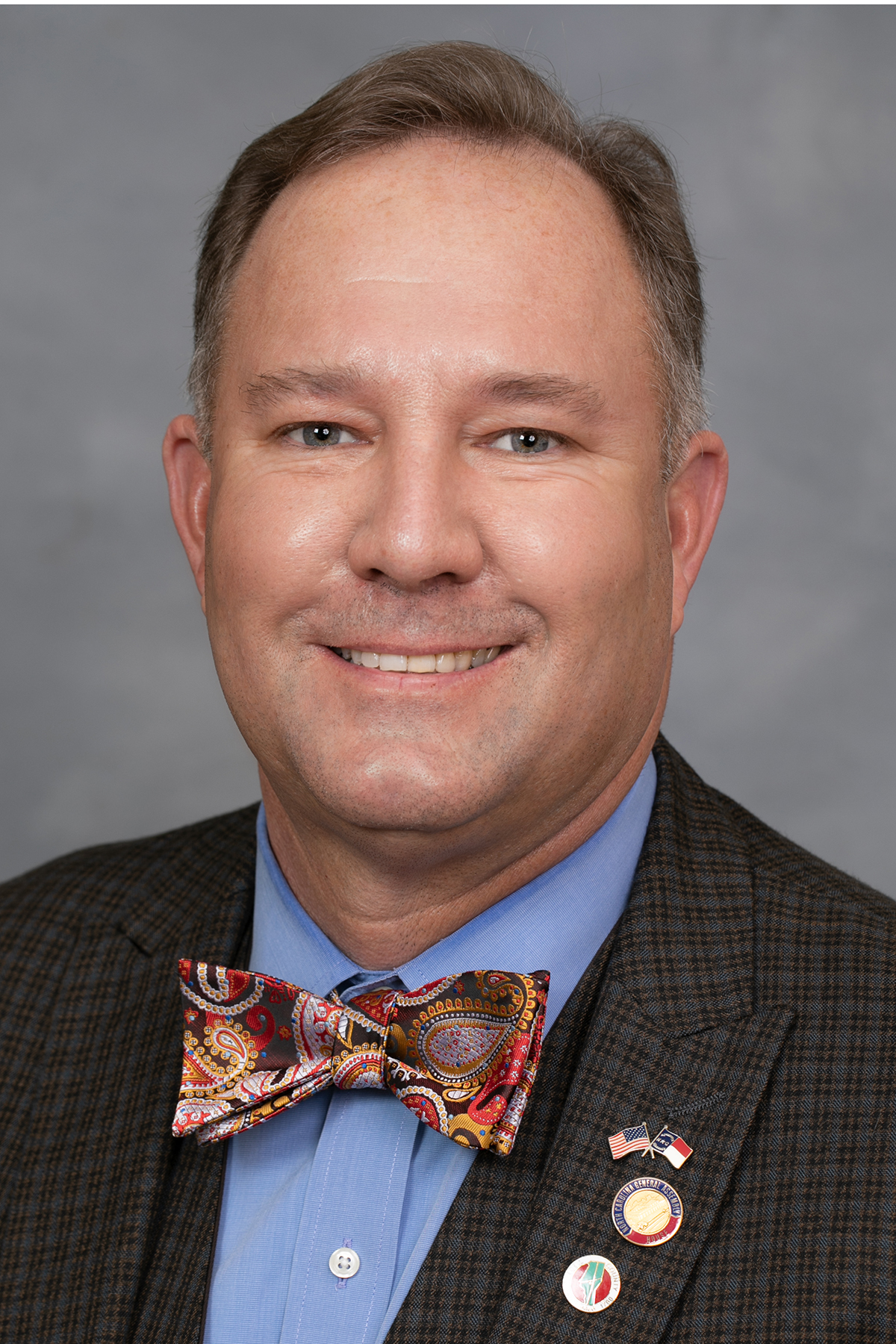

Nominee	Jeffrey McNeely	Chris Gilbert
Party	Republican	Democratic
Popular vote	31,180	13,424
Percentage	68.17%	29.35%
State Representative before election
Jeffrey McNeely
Republican
Elected State Representative
Jeffrey McNeely
Republican

The new 84th district includes portions of northern Iredell County. It includes the home of incumbent Republican Jeffrey McNeely, who has represented the 84th district since 2019.

North Carolina House of Representatives 84th district Republican primary election, 2024
Party	Candidate	Votes	%
Republican	Jeffrey McNeely (incumbent)	6,775	55.24%
Republican	John (Doug) Gallina	5,490	44.76%
Total votes		12,265	100%

North Carolina House of Representatives 84th district general election, 2024
Party	Candidate	Votes	%
Republican	Jeffrey McNeely (incumbent)	31,180	68.17%
Democratic	Chris Gilbert	13,424	29.35%
Independent	Lisa Mozer (write-in)	788	1.72%
Write-in		346	0.76%
Total votes		45,738	100%
Republican hold			

==== District 85 ====
2024 North Carolina's 85th House district election
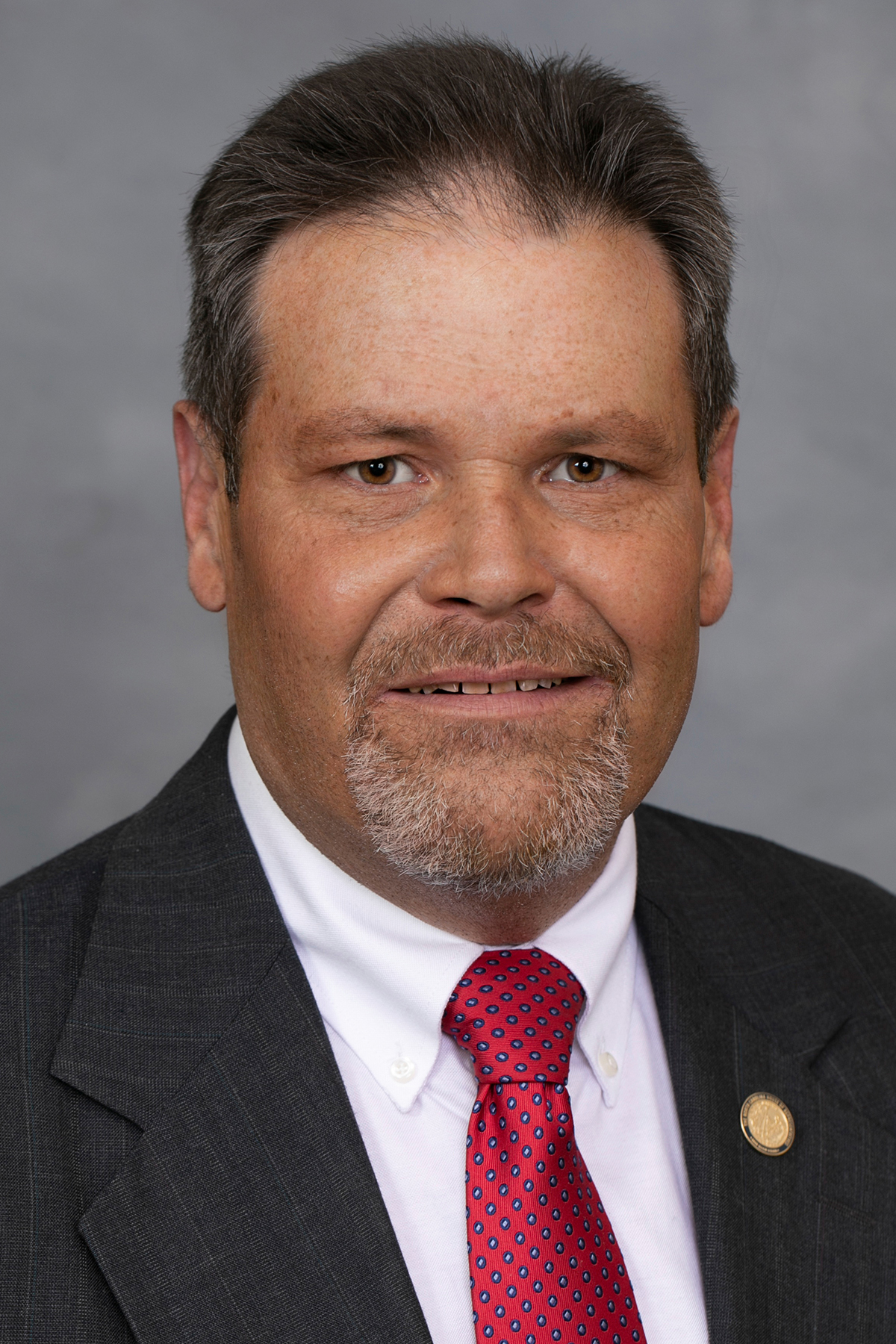

Nominee	Dudley Greene	John Ford
Party	Republican	Democratic
Popular vote	36,145	12,574
Percentage	74.19%	25.81%
State Representative before election
Dudley Greene
Republican
Elected State Representative
Dudley Greene
Republican

The new 85th district includes all of Avery, Mitchell, and Yadkin counties, as well as most of McDowell County. It includes the home of incumbent Republican Dudley Greene, who has represented the 85th district since 2021.

North Carolina House of Representatives 85th district general election, 2024
Party	Candidate	Votes	%
Republican	Dudley Greene (incumbent)	36,145	74.19%
Democratic	John Ford	12,574	25.81%
Total votes		48,719	100%
Republican hold			

==== District 86 ====
2024 North Carolina's 86th House district election
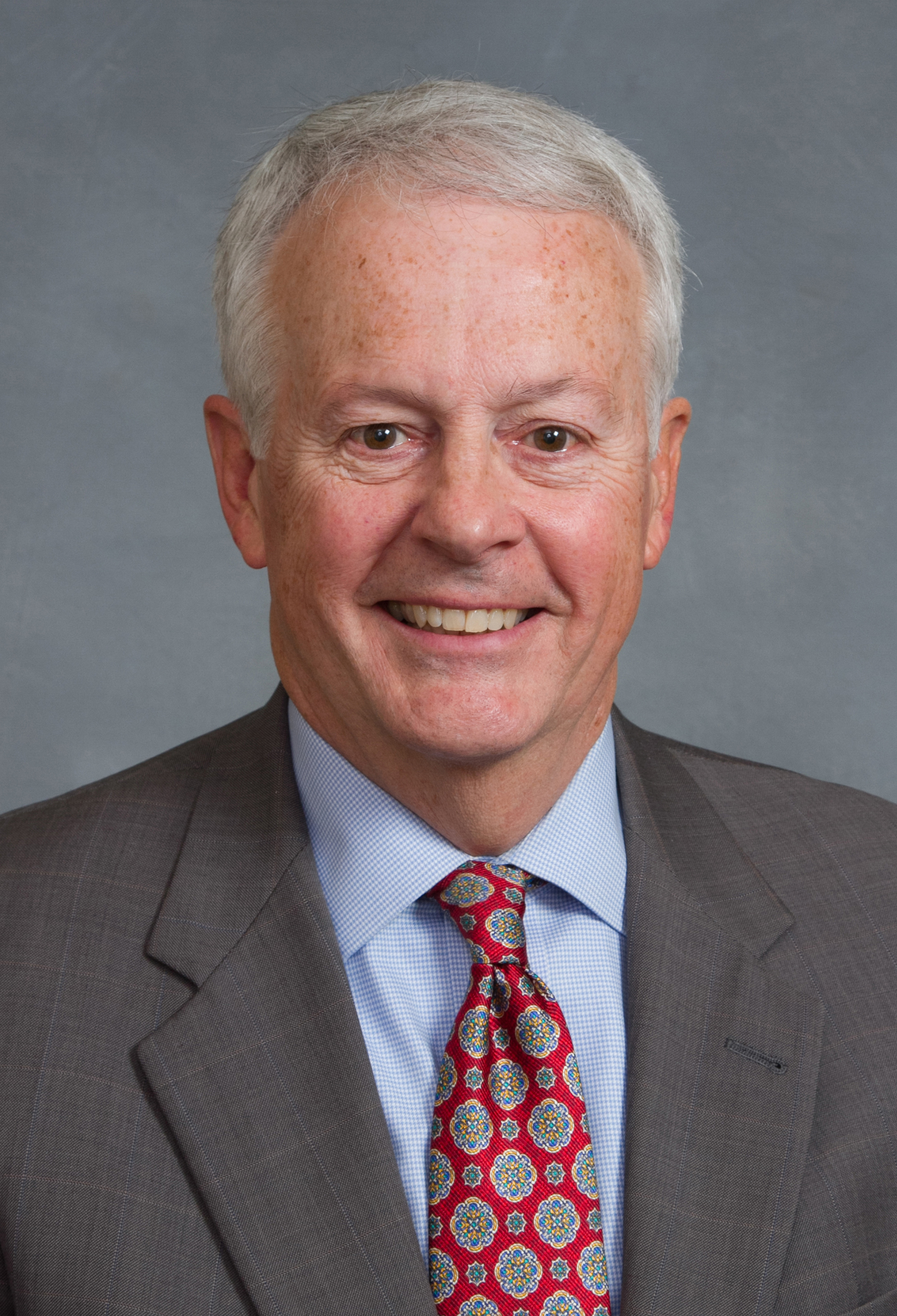

Nominee	Hugh Blackwell	Gena Singleton
Party	Republican	Democratic
Popular vote	32,134	12,467
Percentage	72.05%	27.95%
State Representative before election
Hugh Blackwell
Republican
Elected State Representative
Hugh Blackwell
Republican

The new 86th district includes all of Burke County. It includes the home of incumbent Republican Hugh Blackwell, who has represented the 86th district since 2009.

North Carolina House of Representatives 86th district general election, 2024
Party	Candidate	Votes	%
Republican	Hugh Blackwell (incumbent)	32,134	72.05%
Democratic	Gena Singleton	12,467	27.95%
Total votes		44,601	100%
Republican hold			

==== District 87 ====
2024 North Carolina's 87th House district election
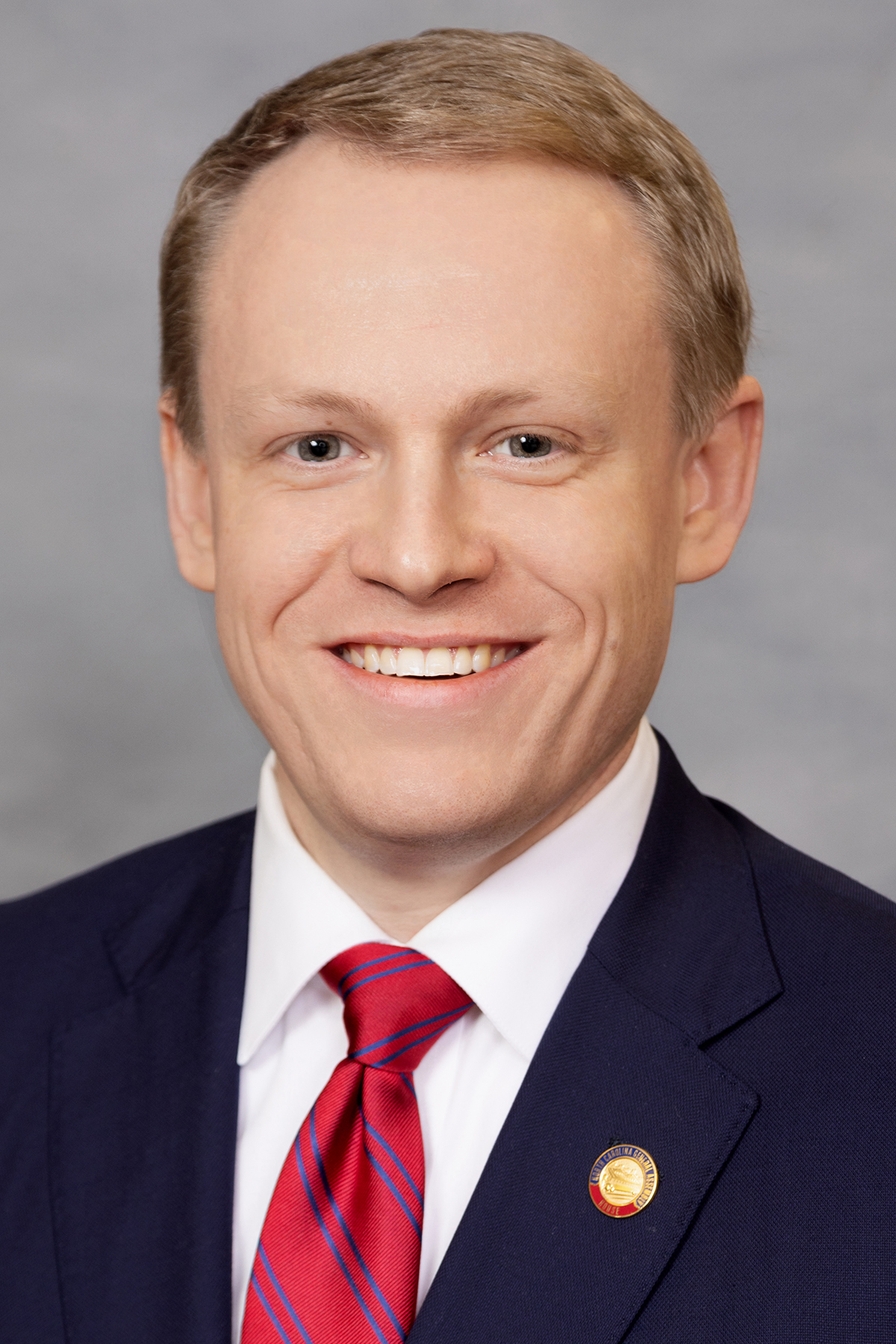

Nominee	Destin Hall	Barbara Kirby
Party	Republican	Democratic
Popular vote	34,187	11,142
Percentage	75.42%	24.58%
State Representative before election
Destin Hall
Republican
Elected State Representative
Destin Hall
Republican

The new 87th district includes all of Caldwell County, and portions of southern Watauga County. It includes the home of incumbent Republican Destin Hall, who has represented the 87th district since 2017.

North Carolina House of Representatives 87th district general election, 2024
Party	Candidate	Votes	%
Republican	Destin Hall (incumbent)	34,187	75.42%
Democratic	Barbara Kirby	11,142	24.58%
Total votes		45,329	100%
Republican hold			

==== District 88 ====
2024 North Carolina's 88th House district election
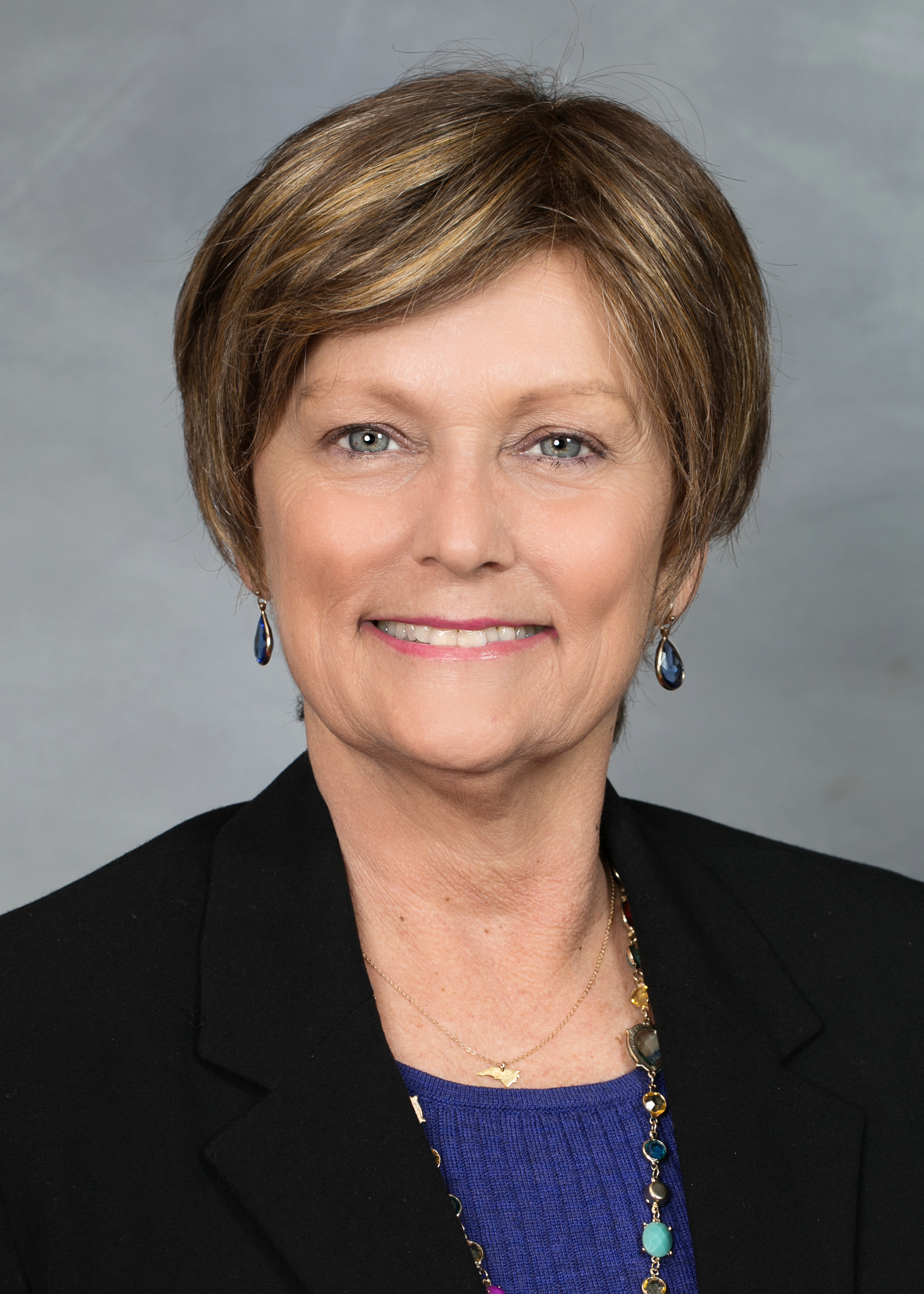
Nominee	Mary Belk
Party	Democratic
Popular vote	33,555
Percentage	100%
State Representative before election
Mary Belk
Democratic
Elected State Representative
Mary Belk
Democratic

The new 88th district includes portions of southern Mecklenburg County. It includes the home of incumbent Democrat Mary Belk, who has represented the 88th district since 2017.

North Carolina House of Representatives 88th district general election, 2024
Party	Candidate	Votes	%
Democratic	Mary Belk (incumbent)	33,555	100%
Total votes		33,555	100%
Democratic hold			

==== District 89 ====
2024 North Carolina's 89th House district election
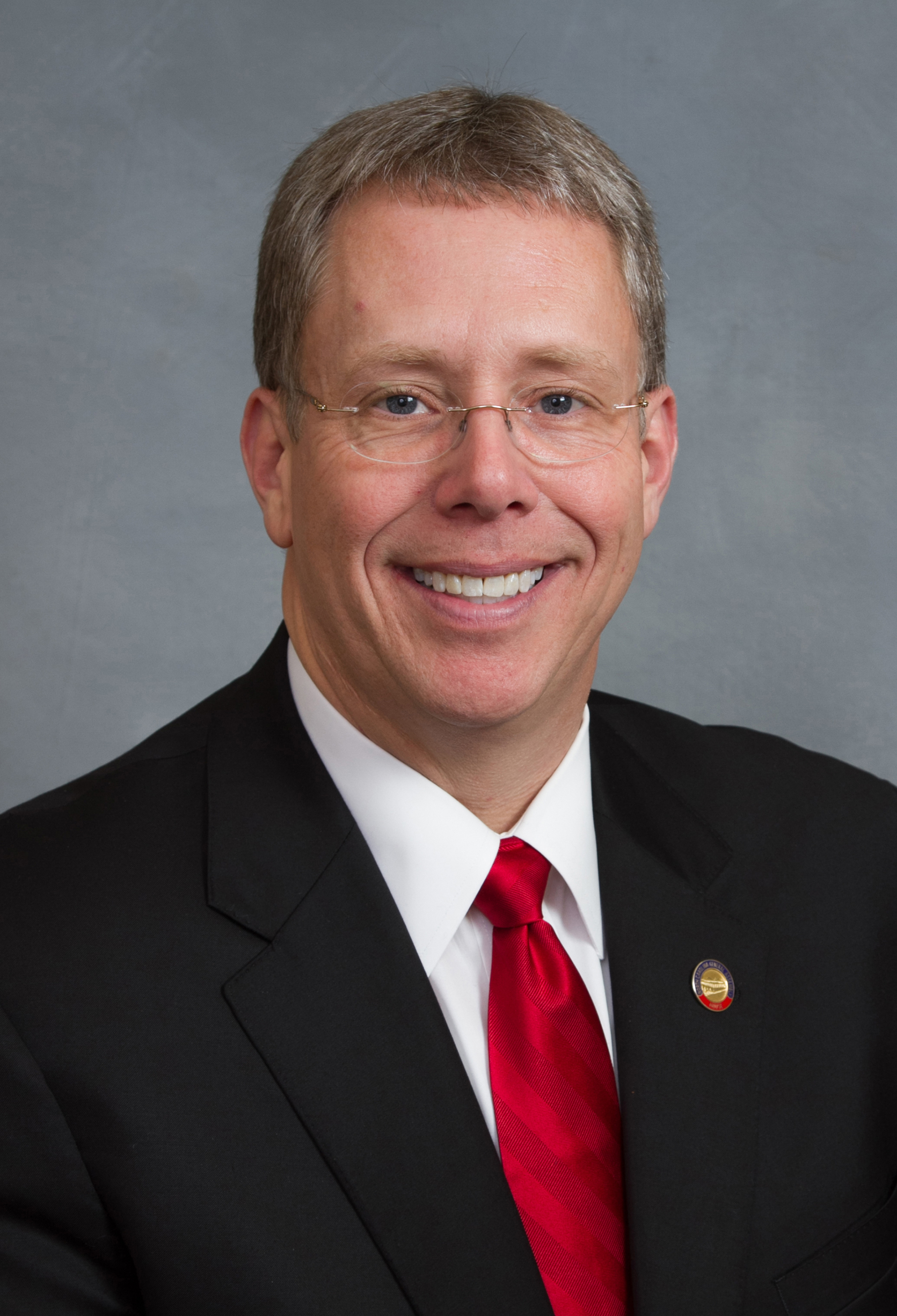

Nominee	Mitchell Setzer	Greg Cranford
Party	Republican	Democratic
Popular vote	38,122	12,044
Percentage	75.99%	24.01%
State Representative before election
Mitchell Setzer
Republican
Elected State Representative
Mitchell Setzer
Republican

The new 89th district includes most of Catawba County and portions of western Iredell County. It includes the home of incumbent Republican Mitchell Setzer, who has represented the 89th district and its predecessors since 1999.

North Carolina House of Representatives 89th district general election, 2024
Party	Candidate	Votes	%
Republican	Mitchell Setzer (incumbent)	38,122	75.99%
Democratic	Greg Cranford	12,044	24.01%
Total votes		50,166	100%
Republican hold			

==== District 90 ====
2024 North Carolina's 90th House district election
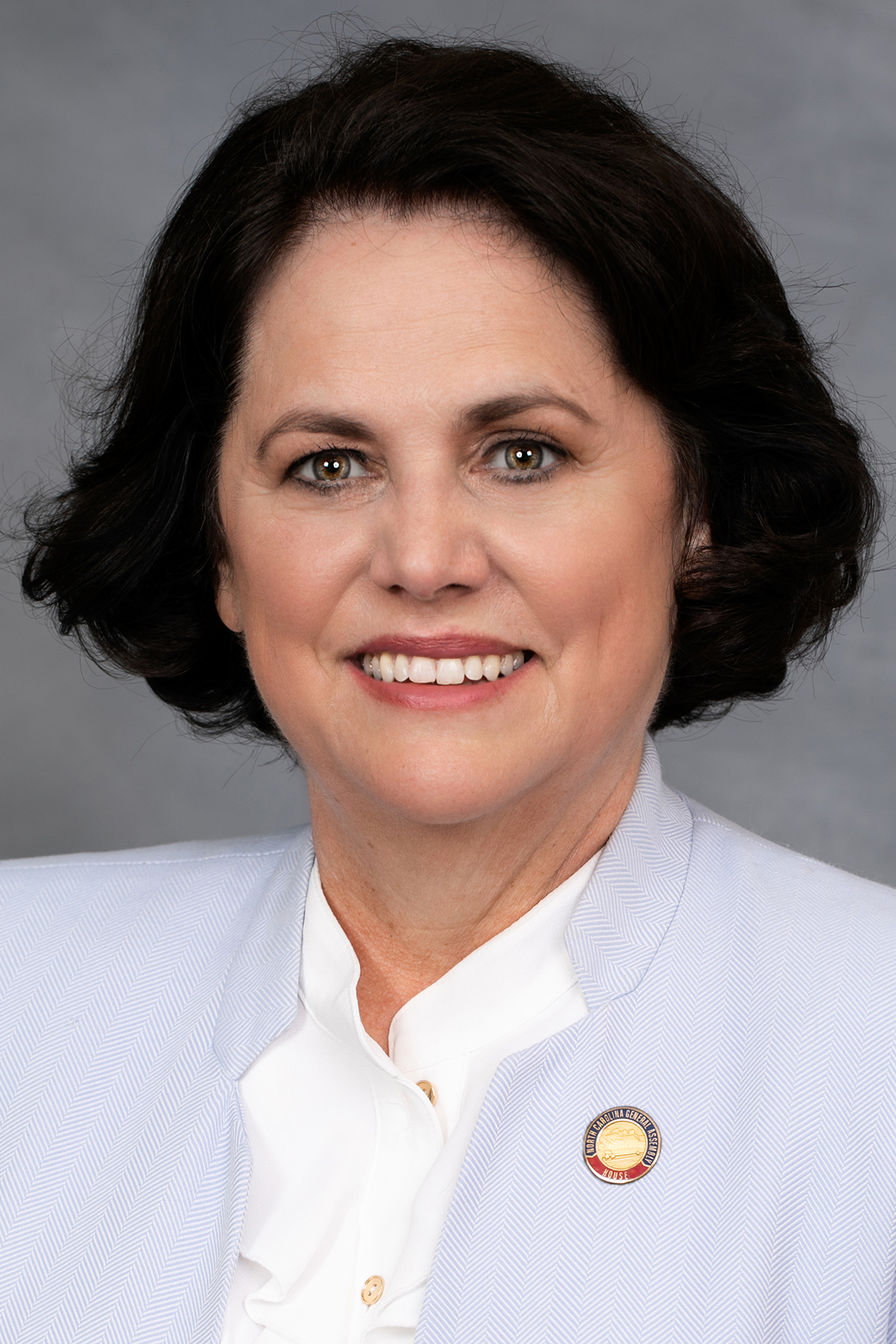

Nominee	Sarah Stevens	Ken Badgett
Party	Republican	Democratic
Popular vote	35,674	10,119
Percentage	77.90%	22.10%
State Representative before election
Sarah Stevens
Republican
Elected State Representative
Sarah Stevens
Republican

The new 90th district includes all of Surry County and portions of northeastern Wilkes County. It includes the home of incumbent Republican Sarah Stevens, who has represented the 90th district since 2009.

North Carolina House of Representatives 90th district general election, 2024
Party	Candidate	Votes	%
Republican	Sarah Stevens (incumbent)	35,674	77.90%
Democratic	Ken Badgett	10,119	22.10%
Total votes		45,793	100%
Republican hold			

==== District 91 ====
2024 North Carolina's 91st House district election
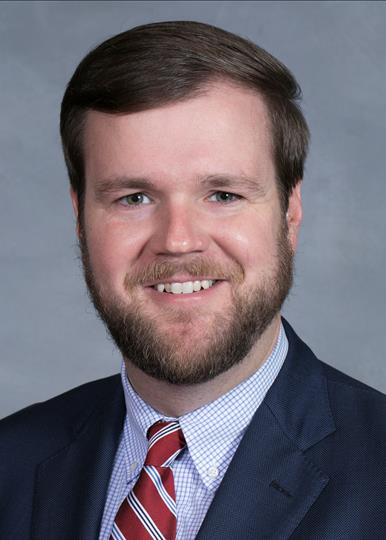

Nominee	Kyle Hall	Vivian Fulk
Party	Republican	Democratic
Popular vote	29,819	14,583
Percentage	67.16%	32.84%
State Representative before election
Kyle Hall
Republican
Elected State Representative
Kyle Hall
Republican

The new 91st district includes all of Stokes County and portions of northern Forsyth County. It includes the home of incumbent Republican Kyle Hall, who has represented the 91st district since 2015.

North Carolina House of Representatives 91st district general election, 2024
Party	Candidate	Votes	%
Republican	Kyle Hall (incumbent)	29,819	67.16%
Democratic	Vivian Fulk	14,583	32.84%
Total votes		44,402	100%
Republican hold			

==== District 92 ====
2024 North Carolina's 92nd House district election
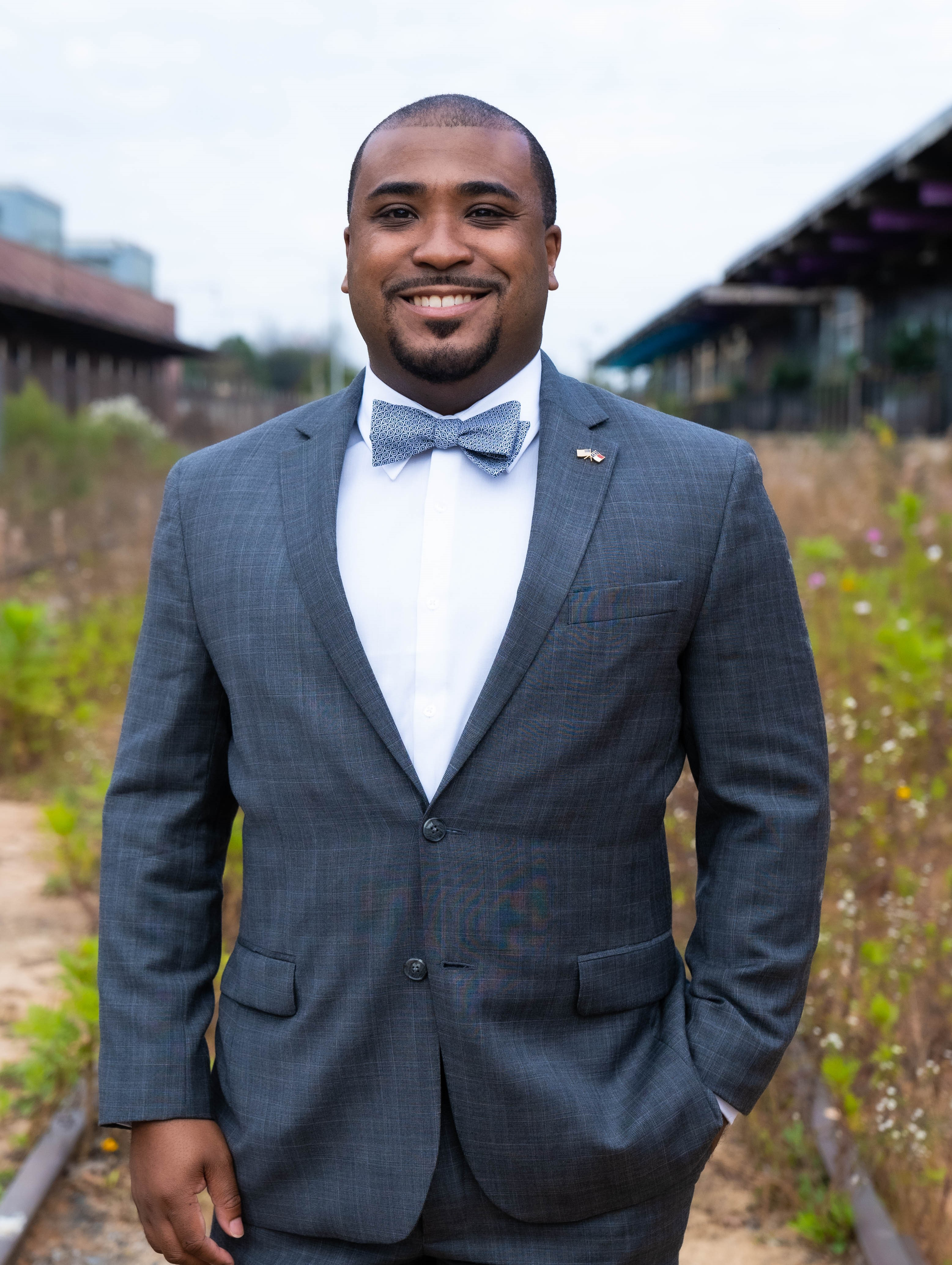
Nominee	Terry Brown
Party	Democratic
Popular vote	37,214
Percentage	100%
State Representative before election
Terry Brown
Democratic
Elected State Representative
Terry Brown
Democratic

The new 92nd district includes portions of southwestern Mecklenburg County. It includes the home of incumbent Democrat Terry Brown, who has represented the 92nd district since 2021.

North Carolina House of Representatives 92nd district general election, 2024
Party	Candidate	Votes	%
Democratic	Terry Brown (incumbent)	37,214	100%
Total votes		37,214	100%
Democratic hold			

==== District 93 ====
2024 North Carolina's 93rd House district election
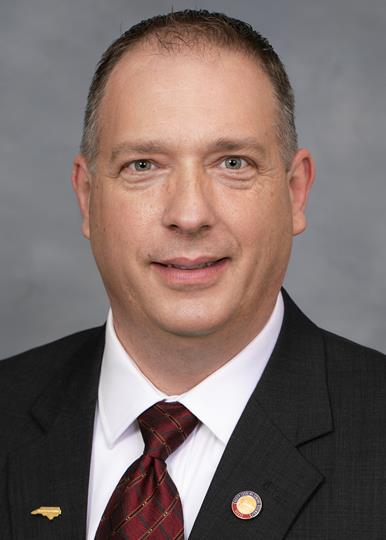

Nominee	Ray Pickett	Ben Massey
Party	Republican	Democratic
Popular vote	28,752	21,841
Percentage	56.83%	43.17%
State Representative before election
Ray Pickett
Republican
Elected State Representative
Ray Pickett
Republican

The new 93rd district includes all of Ashe and Alleghany counties, as well as most of Watauga County. It includes the home of incumbent Republican Ray Pickett, who has represented the 93rd district since 2021.

North Carolina House of Representatives 93rd district general election, 2024
Party	Candidate	Votes	%
Republican	Ray Pickett (incumbent)	28,752	56.83%
Democratic	Ben Massey	21,841	43.17%
Total votes		50,593	100%
Republican hold			

==== District 94 ====
2024 North Carolina's 94th House district election
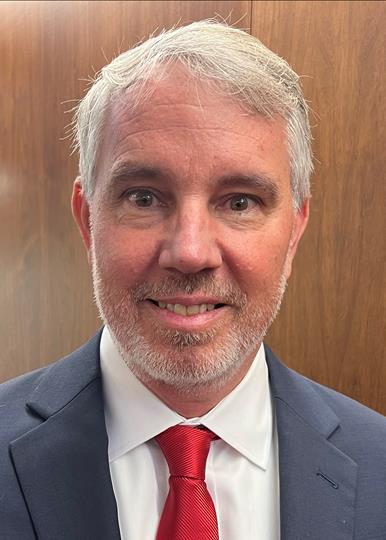

Nominee	Blair Eddins	Steve Moree
Party	Republican	Democratic
Popular vote	35,329	10,573
Percentage	76.97%	23.03%
State Representative before election
Blair Eddins
Republican
Elected State Representative
Blair Eddins
Republican

The new 94th district includes all of Alexander County, as well as most of Wilkes County. It includes the home of incumbent Republican Jeffrey Elmore, who has represented the 94th district since 2013. On May 9, 2023, Elmore announced his intent to retire after six terms to run for Lieutenant Governor. Elmore resigned on September 13, 2024 and Republican nominee Blair Eddins was appointed to the seat on September 24, 2024.

North Carolina House of Representatives 94th district Republican primary election, 2024
Party	Candidate	Votes	%
Republican	Blair Eddins	6,869	43.31%
Republican	Stoney Greene	4,922	31.04%
Republican	Larry Yoder	2,628	16.57%
Republican	Dwight Shook	1,440	9.08%
Total votes		15,859	100%

North Carolina House of Representatives 94th district general election, 2024
Party	Candidate	Votes	%
Republican	Blair Eddins (incumbent)	35,329	76.97%
Democratic	Steve Moree	10,573	23.03%
Total votes		45,902	100%
Republican hold			

==== District 95 ====
2024 North Carolina's 95th House district election
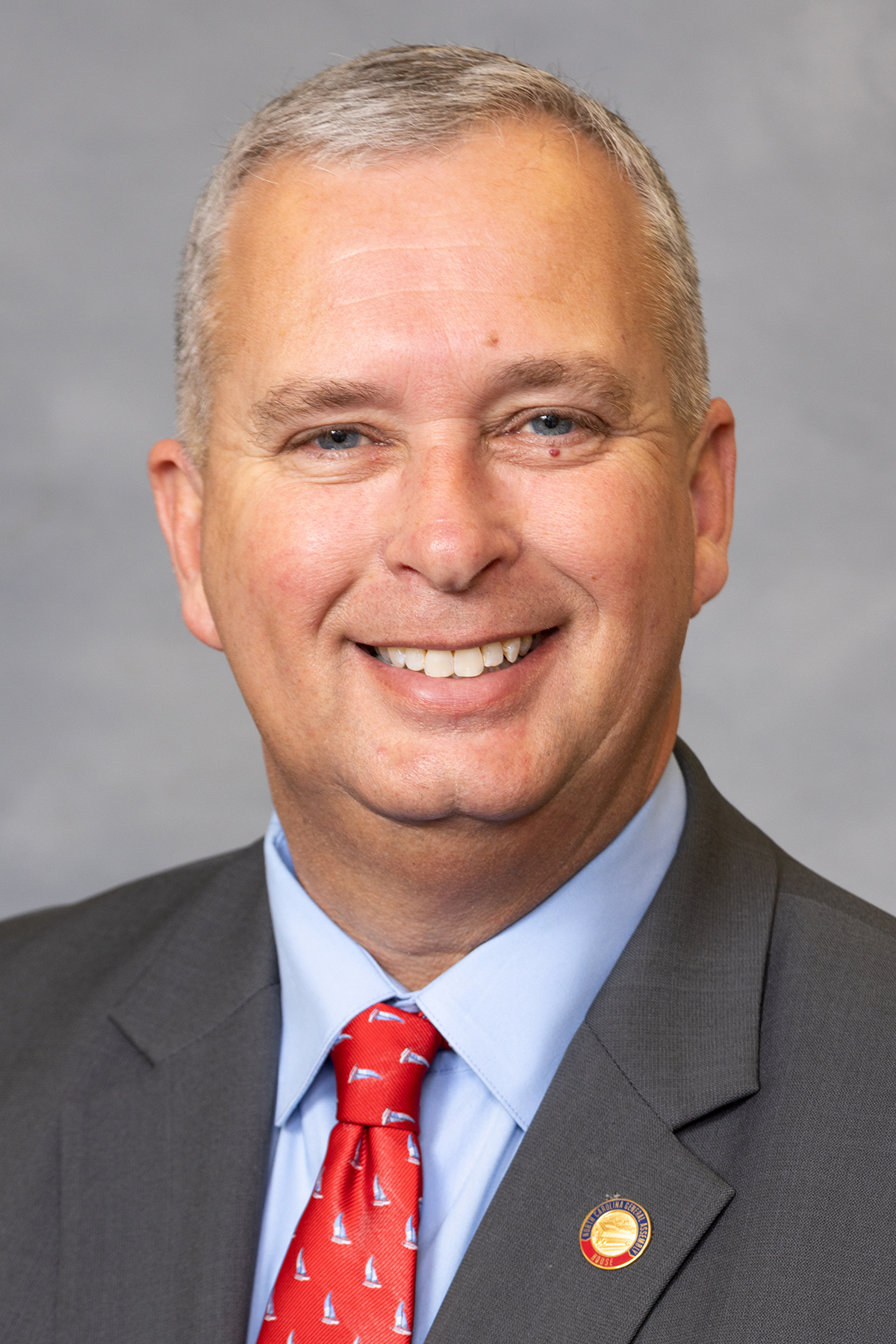

Nominee	Todd Carver	Mike Robinson
Party	Republican	Democratic
Popular vote	32,402	17,855
Percentage	64.47%	35.53%
State Representative before election
Grey Mills
Republican
Elected State Representative
Todd Carver
Republican

The new 95th district includes portions of southern Iredell County. It includes the home of incumbent Republican Grey Mills, who has represented the 95th district since 2021. On December 11, 2023, Mills announced his intent to retire after two terms to run for Congress.

North Carolina House of Representatives 95th district general election, 2024
Party	Candidate	Votes	%
Republican	Todd Carver	32,402	64.47%
Democratic	Mike Robinson	17,855	35.53%
Total votes		50,257	100%
Republican hold			

==== District 96 ====
2024 North Carolina's 96th House district election
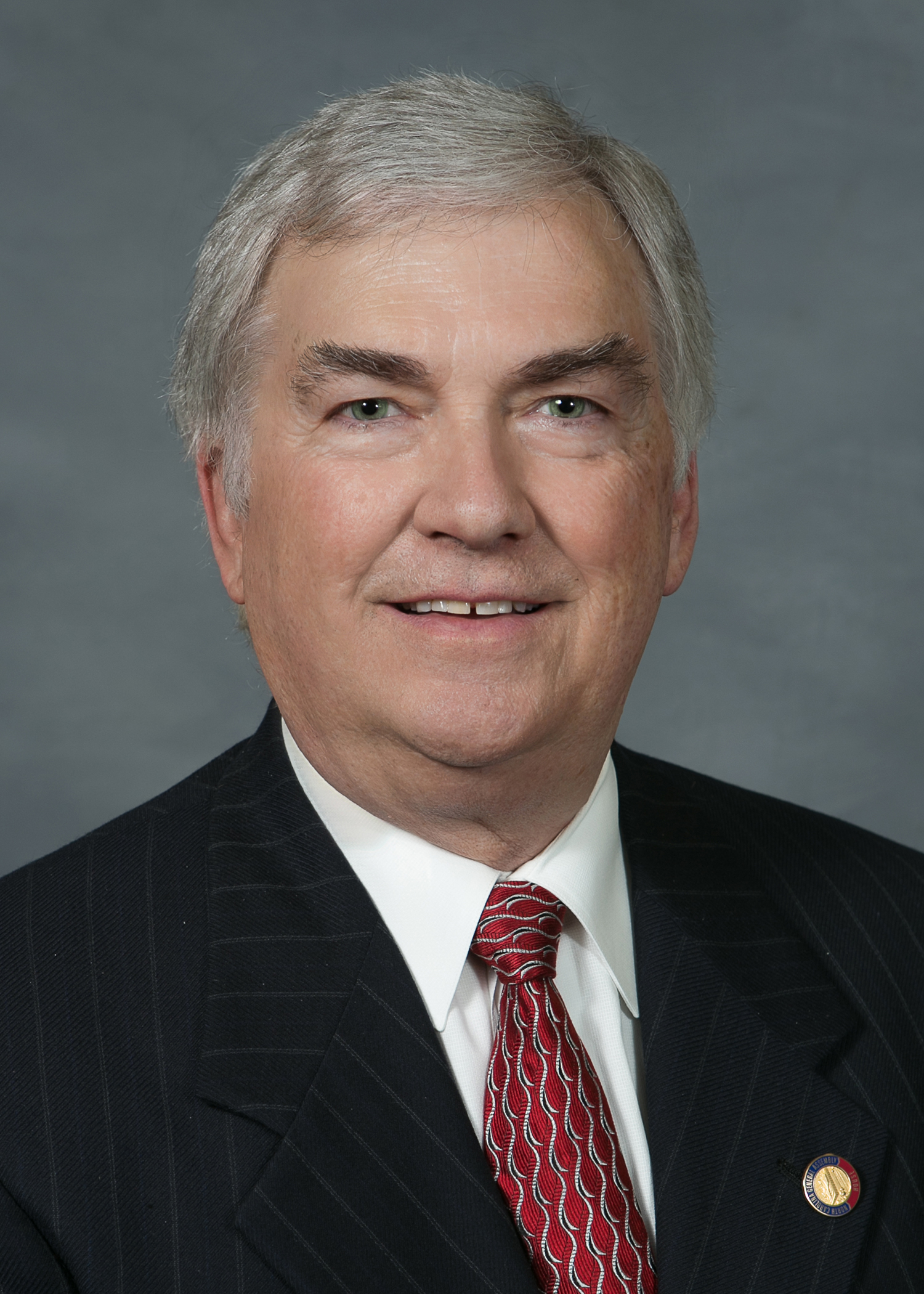

Nominee	Jay Adams	Elizabeth Glynn
Party	Republican	Democratic
Popular vote	28,037	15,629
Percentage	64.21%	35.79%
State Representative before election
Jay Adams
Republican
Elected State Representative
Jay Adams
Republican

The new 96th district includes portions of northwestern Catawba County. It includes the home of incumbent Republican Jay Adams, who has represented the 96th district since 2015.

North Carolina House of Representatives 96th district general election, 2024
Party	Candidate	Votes	%
Republican	Jay Adams (incumbent)	28,037	64.21%
Democratic	Elizabeth (Eli) Glynn	15,629	35.79%
Total votes		43,666	100%
Republican hold			

==== District 97 ====
2024 North Carolina's 97th House district election
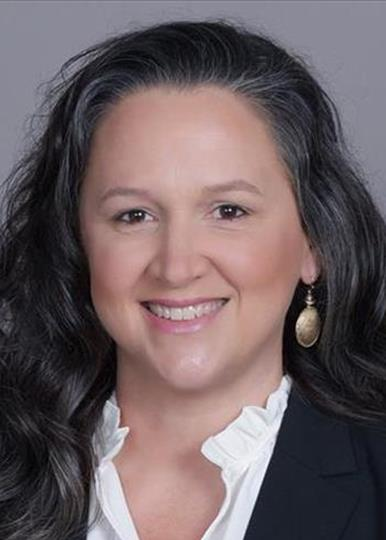
Nominee	Heather Rhyne
Party	Republican
Popular vote	43,332
Percentage	100%
State Representative before election
Heather Rhyne
Republican
Elected State Representative
Heather Rhyne
Republican

The new 97th district includes all of Lincoln County. It includes the home of incumbent Republican Jason Saine, who has represented the 97th district since 2011. Saine resigned his seat on August 12, 2024 and fellow Republican Heather Rhyne was appointed to the seat on August 19 2024.

North Carolina House of Representatives 97th district general election, 2024
Party	Candidate	Votes	%
Republican	Heather Rhyne (incumbent)	43,332	100%
Total votes		43,332	100%
Republican hold			

==== District 98 ====
2024 North Carolina's 98th House district election
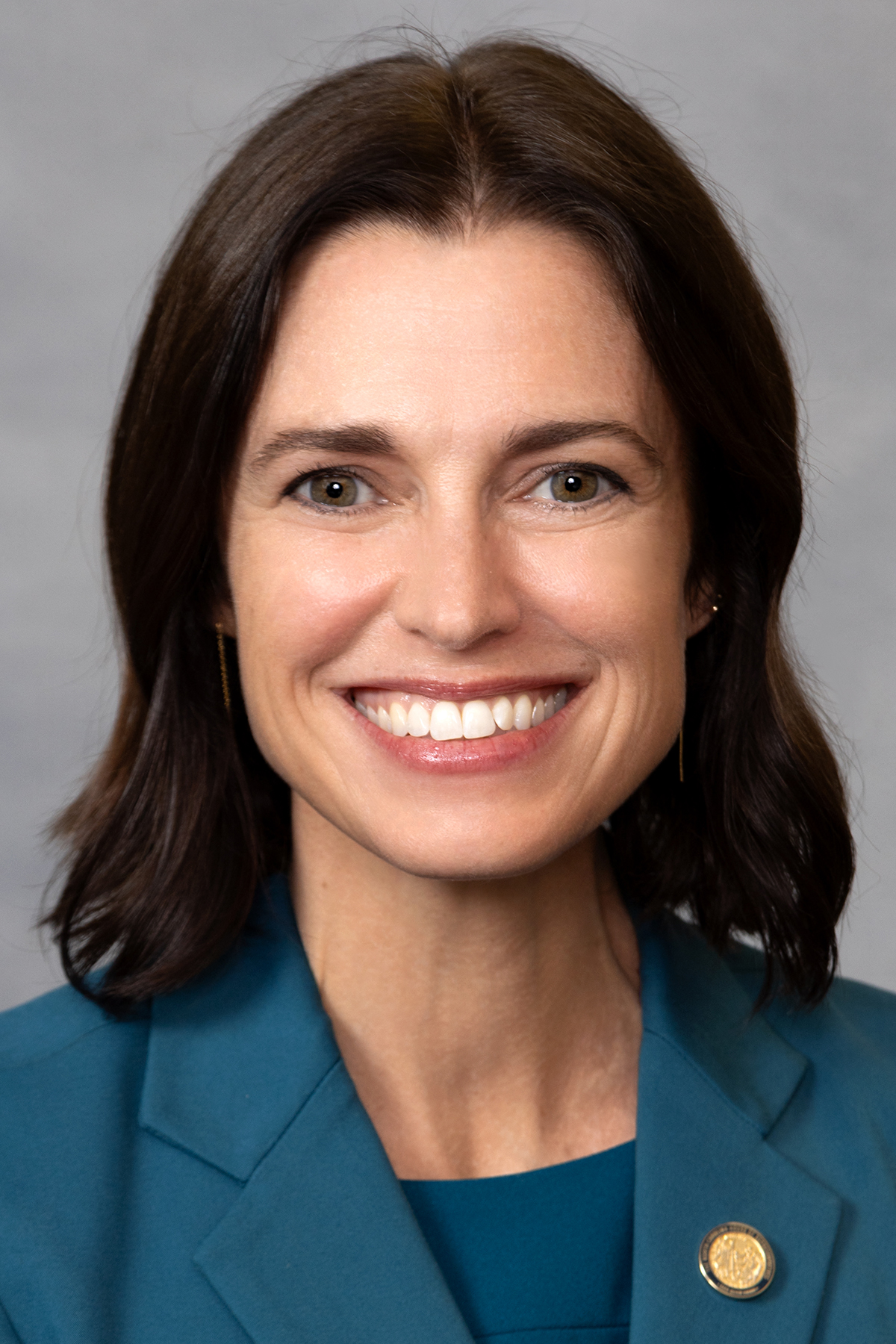

Nominee	Beth Helfrich	Melinda Bales
Party	Democratic	Republican
Popular vote	27,083	24,800
Percentage	52.20%	47.80%
State Representative before election
John Bradford
Republican
Elected State Representative
Beth Helfrich
Democratic

The new 98th district includes portions of northern Mecklenburg County. It includes the home of incumbent Republican John Bradford, who has represented the 98th district since 2021. Initially, on April 20, 2023, Bradford announced his intent to retire after two terms to run for State Treasurer, but on December 8, 2023, Bradford withdrew from that race and announced he would run for Congress.

North Carolina House of Representatives 98th district Democratic primary election, 2024
Party	Candidate	Votes	%
Democratic	Beth Helfrich	3,997	65.55%
Democratic	Lisa Jewel	2,101	34.45%
Total votes		6,098	100%

North Carolina House of Representatives 98th district general election, 2024
Party	Candidate	Votes	%
Democratic	Beth Helfrich	27,083	52.20%
Republican	Melinda Bales	24,800	47.80%
Total votes		51,883	100%
Democratic gain from Republican			

==== District 99 ====
2024 North Carolina's 99th House district election
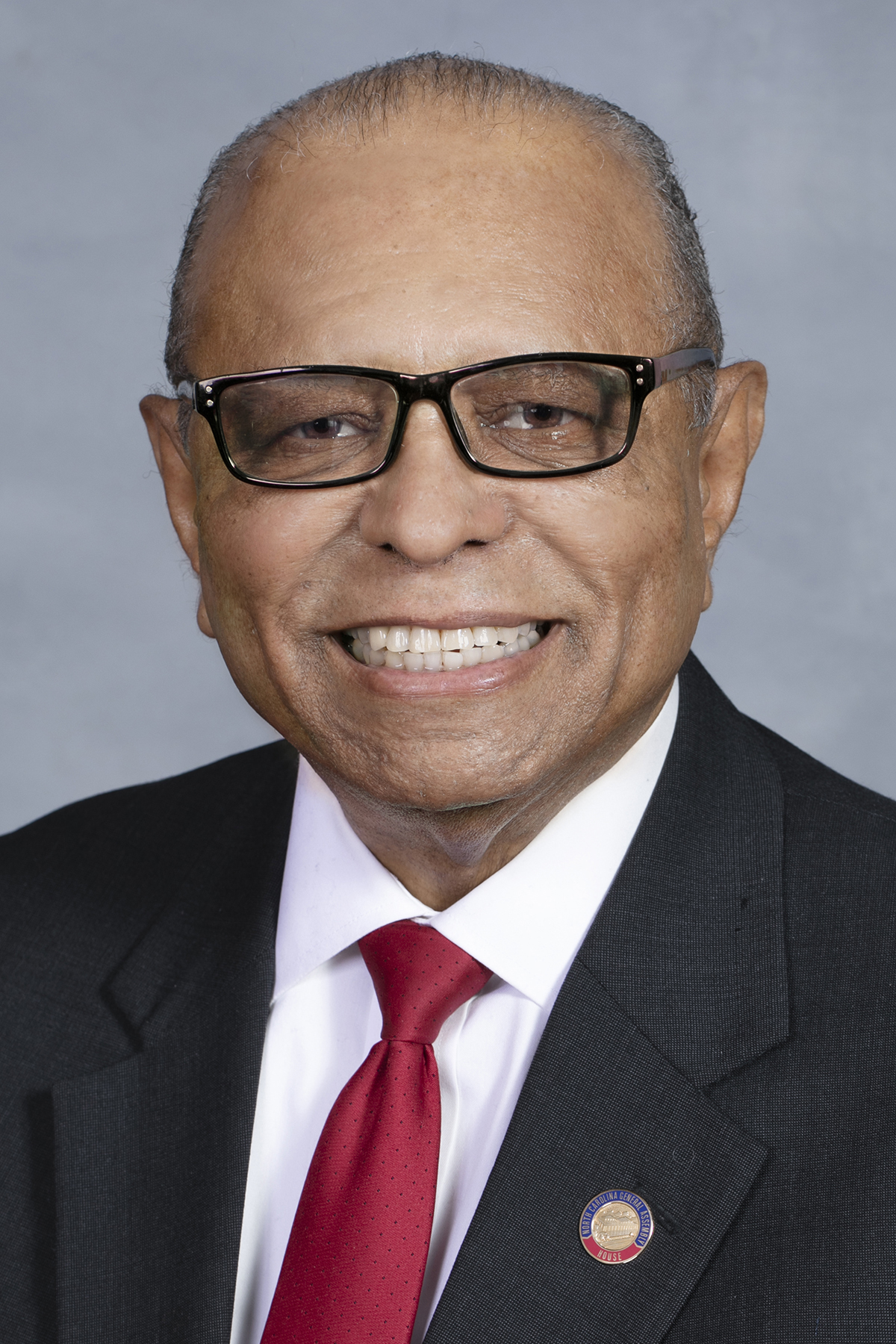

Nominee	Nasif Majeed	Rob Yates
Party	Democratic	Libertarian
Popular vote	27,772	4,373
Percentage	86.40%	13.60%
State Representative before election
Nasif Majeed
Democratic
Elected State Representative
Nasif Majeed
Democratic

The new 99th district includes portions of eastern Mecklenburg County. It includes the home of incumbent Democrat Nasif Majeed, who has represented the 99th district since 2019.

North Carolina House of Representatives 99th district general election, 2024
Party	Candidate	Votes	%
Democratic	Nasif Majeed (incumbent)	27,772	86.40%
Libertarian	Rob Yates	4,373	13.60%
Total votes		32,145	100%
Democratic hold			

=== Districts 100-120 ===
==== District 100 ====
2024 North Carolina's 100th House district election
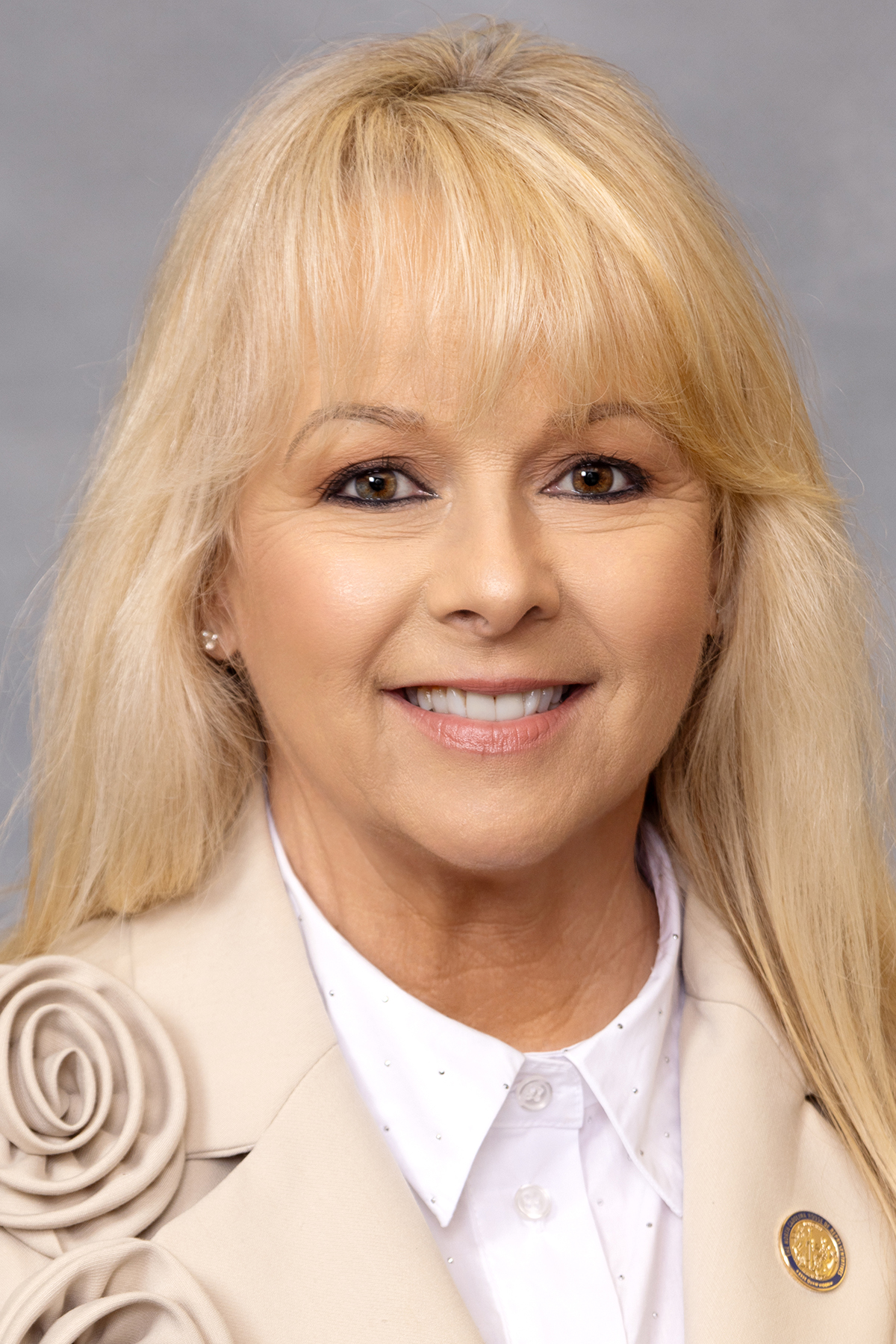
Nominee	Julia Greenfield
Party	Democratic
Popular vote	28,937
Percentage	100%
State Representative before election
John Autry
Democratic
Elected State Representative
Julia Greenfield
Democratic

The new 100th district includes portions of southeastern Mecklenburg County. It includes the home of incumbent Democrat John Autry, who has represented the 100th district since 2017. On November 10, 2023, Autry announced his intent to retire after four terms.

North Carolina House of Representatives 100th district general election, 2024
Party	Candidate	Votes	%
Democratic	Julia Greenfield	28,937	100%
Total votes		28,937	100%
Democratic hold			

==== District 101 ====
2024 North Carolina's 101st House district election
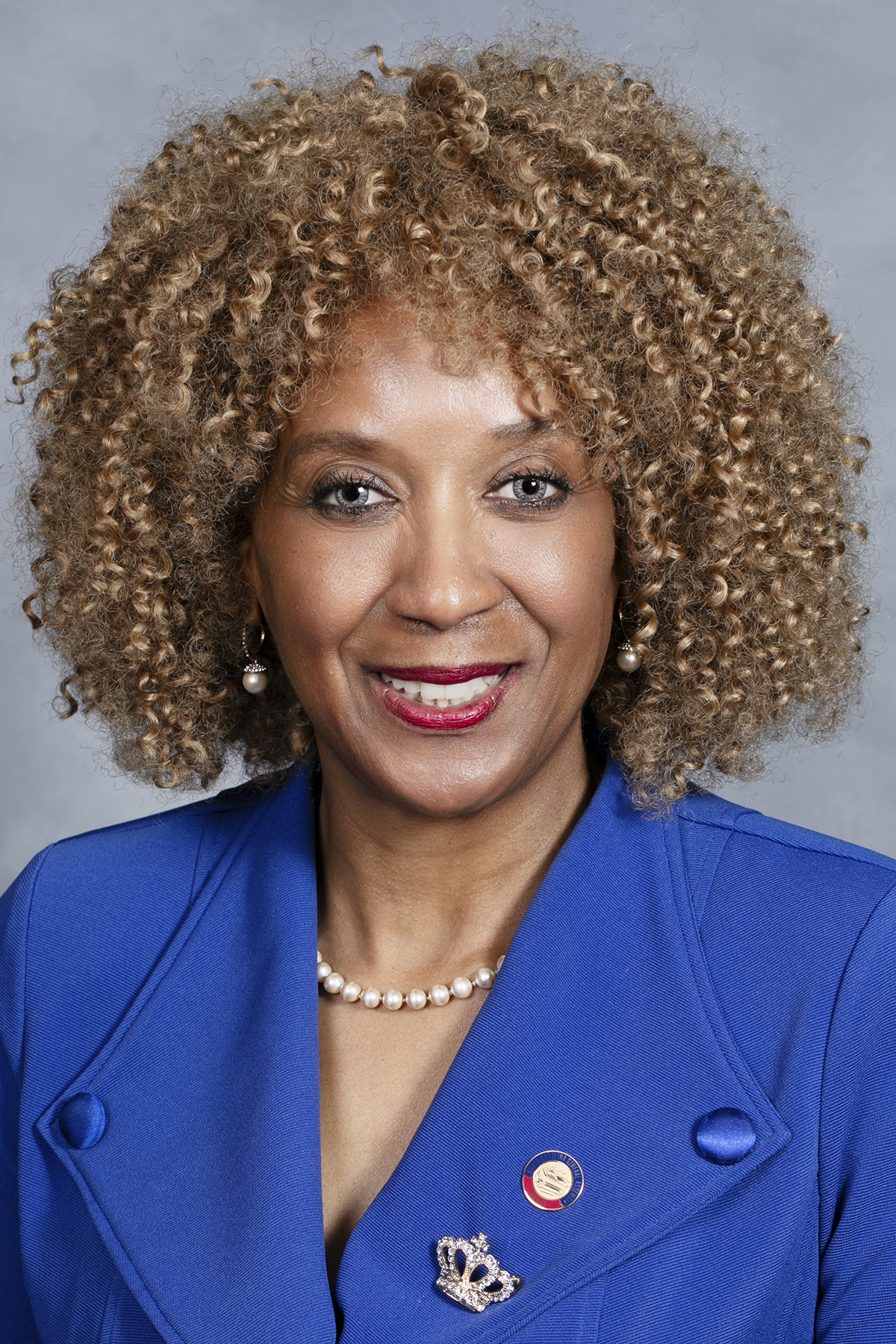
Nominee	Carolyn Logan
Party	Democratic
Popular vote	34,424
Percentage	100%
State Representative before election
Carolyn Logan
Democratic
Elected State Representative
Carolyn Logan
Democratic

The new 101st district includes portions of northern Mecklenburg County. It includes the home of incumbent Democrat Carolyn Logan, who has represented the 101st district since 2019.

North Carolina House of Representatives 101st district general election, 2024
Party	Candidate	Votes	%
Democratic	Carolyn Logan (incumbent)	34,424	100%
Total votes		34,424	100%
Democratic hold			

==== District 102 ====
2024 North Carolina's 102nd House district election
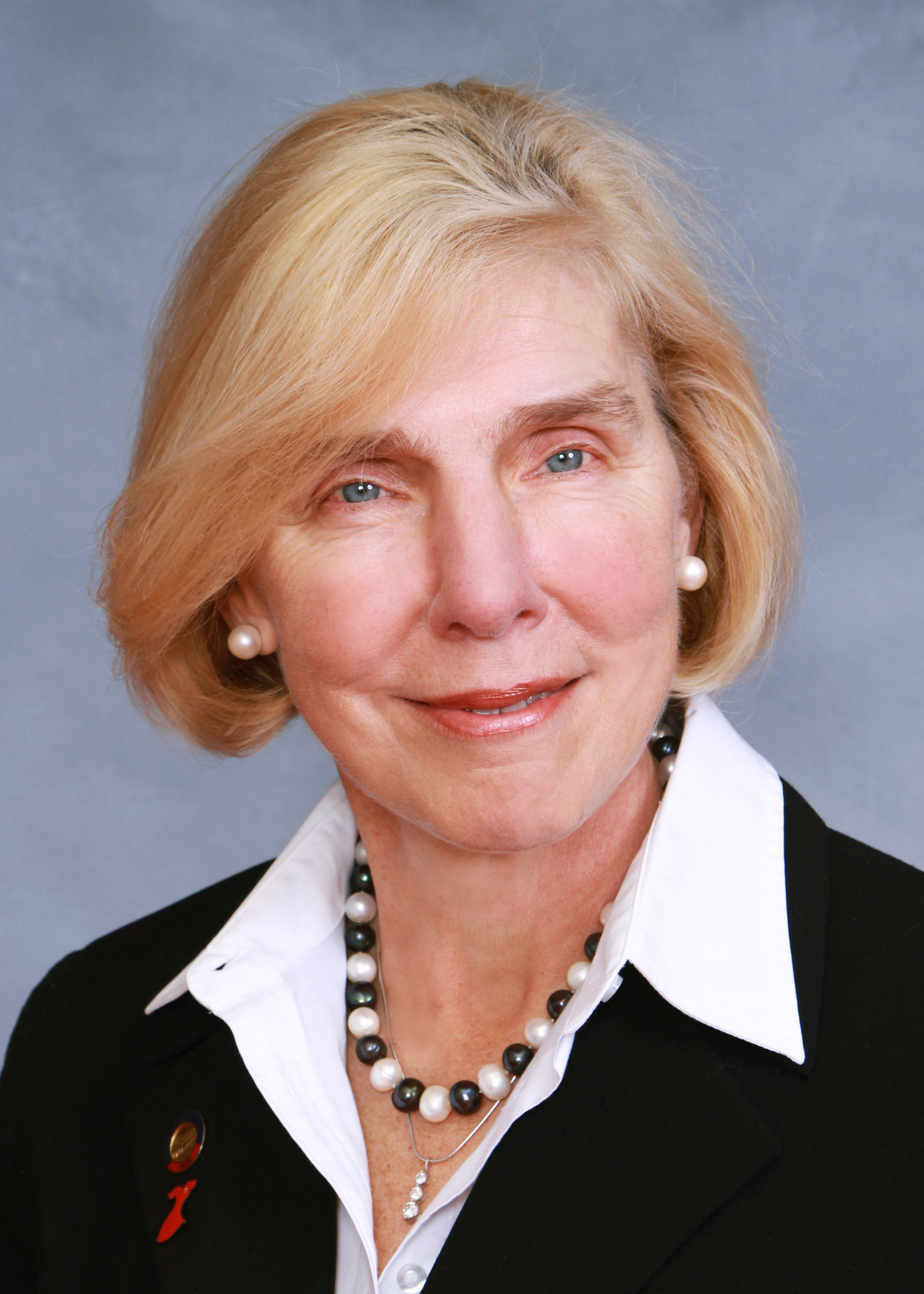
Nominee	Becky Carney
Party	Democratic
Popular vote	39,811
Percentage	100%
State Representative before election
Becky Carney
Democratic
Elected State Representative
Becky Carney
Democratic

The new 102nd district includes portions of central Mecklenburg County. It includes the home of incumbent Democrat Becky Carney, who has represented the 102nd district since 2003.

North Carolina House of Representatives 102nd district general election, 2024
Party	Candidate	Votes	%
Democratic	Becky Carney (incumbent)	39,811	100%
Total votes		39,811	100%
Democratic hold			

==== District 103 ====
2024 North Carolina's 103rd House district election
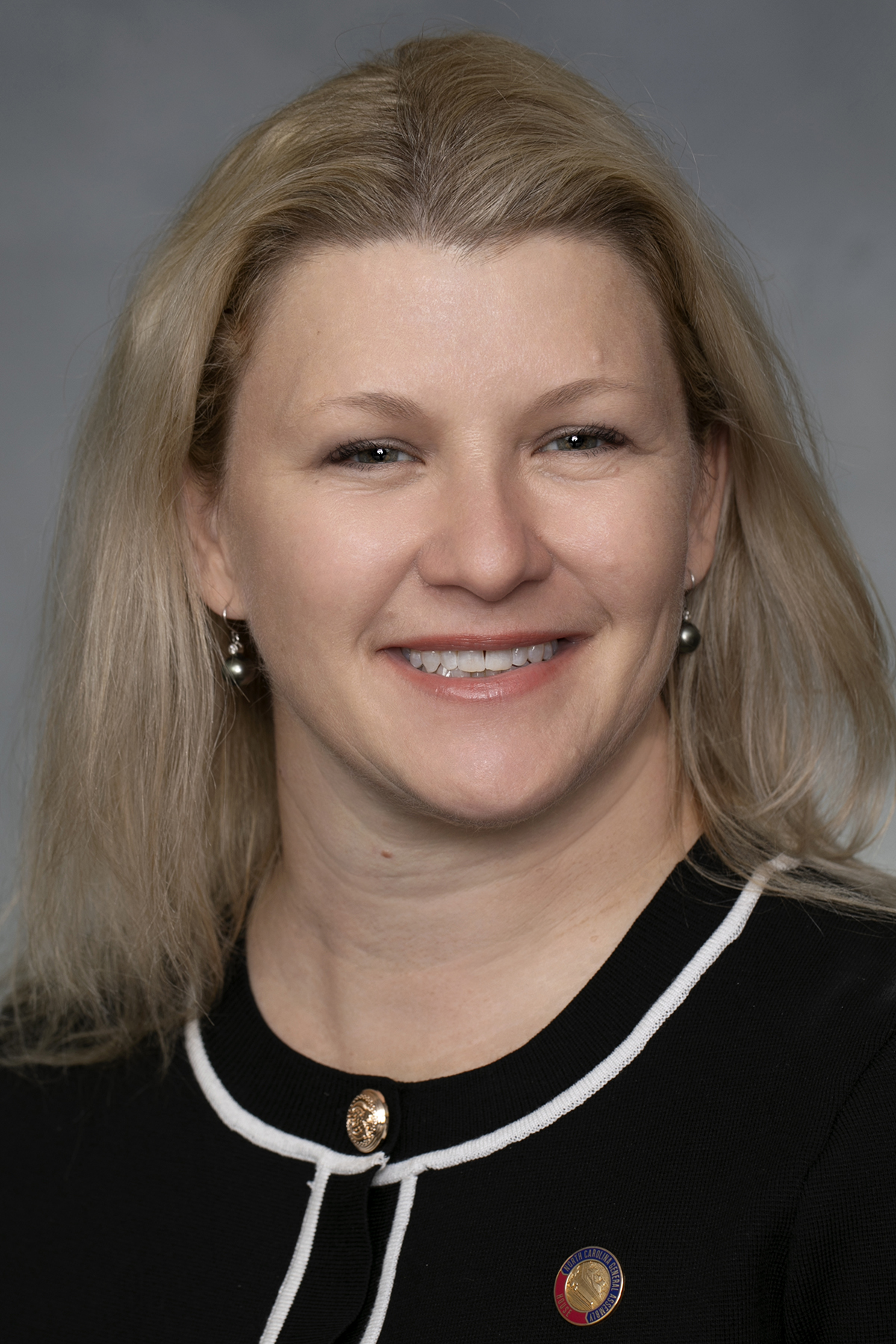

Nominee	Laura Budd	Joshua Niday
Party	Democratic	Republican
Popular vote	25,772	18,609
Percentage	58.07%	41.93%
State Representative before election
Laura Budd
Democratic
Wesley Harris
Democratic
Elected State Representative
Laura Budd
Democratic

The new 103rd district includes portions of southern Mecklenburg County. It includes the homes of incumbent Democrat Laura Budd, who has represented the 103rd district since 2019, and Wesley Harris, who has represented the 105th district since 2019. On March 13, 2023, Harris announced his intent to retire after three terms to run for State Treasurer.

North Carolina House of Representatives 103rd district general election, 2024
Party	Candidate	Votes	%
Democratic	Laura Budd (incumbent)	25,772	58.07%
Republican	Joshua Niday	18,609	41.93%
Total votes		44,381	100%
Democratic hold			

==== District 104 ====
2024 North Carolina's 104th House district election
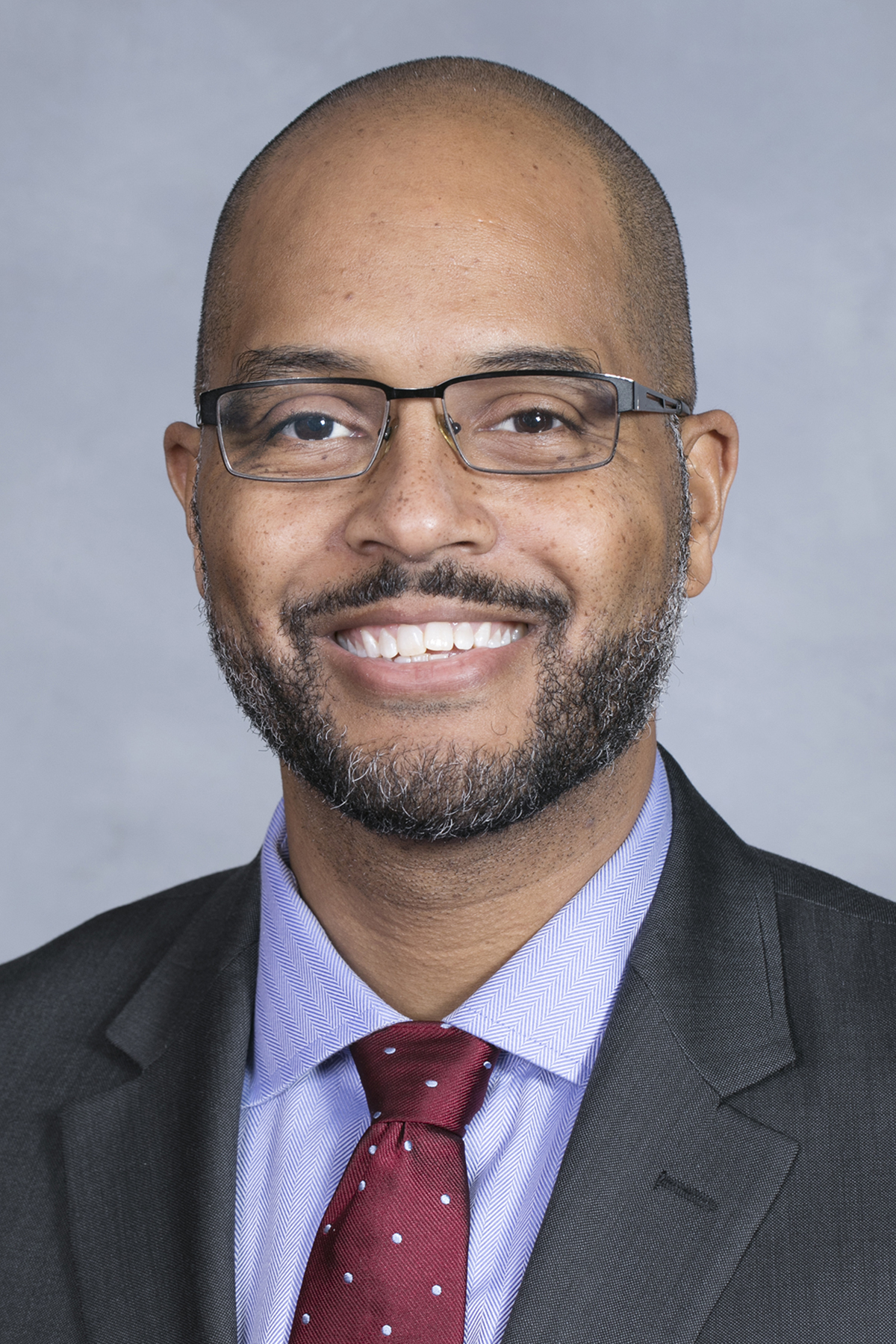

Nominee	Brandon Lofton	Krista Bokhari
Party	Democratic	Republican
Popular vote	27,629	21,748
Percentage	55.96%	44.04%
State Representative before election
Brandon Lofton
Democratic
Elected State Representative
Brandon Lofton
Democratic

The new 104th district includes portions of southern Mecklenburg County. It includes the home of incumbent Democrat Brandon Lofton, who has represented the 104th district since 2019.

North Carolina House of Representatives 104th district general election, 2024
Party	Candidate	Votes	%
Democratic	Brandon Lofton (incumbent)	27,629	55.96%
Republican	Krista Bokhari	21,748	44.04%
Total votes		49,377	100%
Democratic hold			

==== District 105 ====
2024 North Carolina's 105th House district election
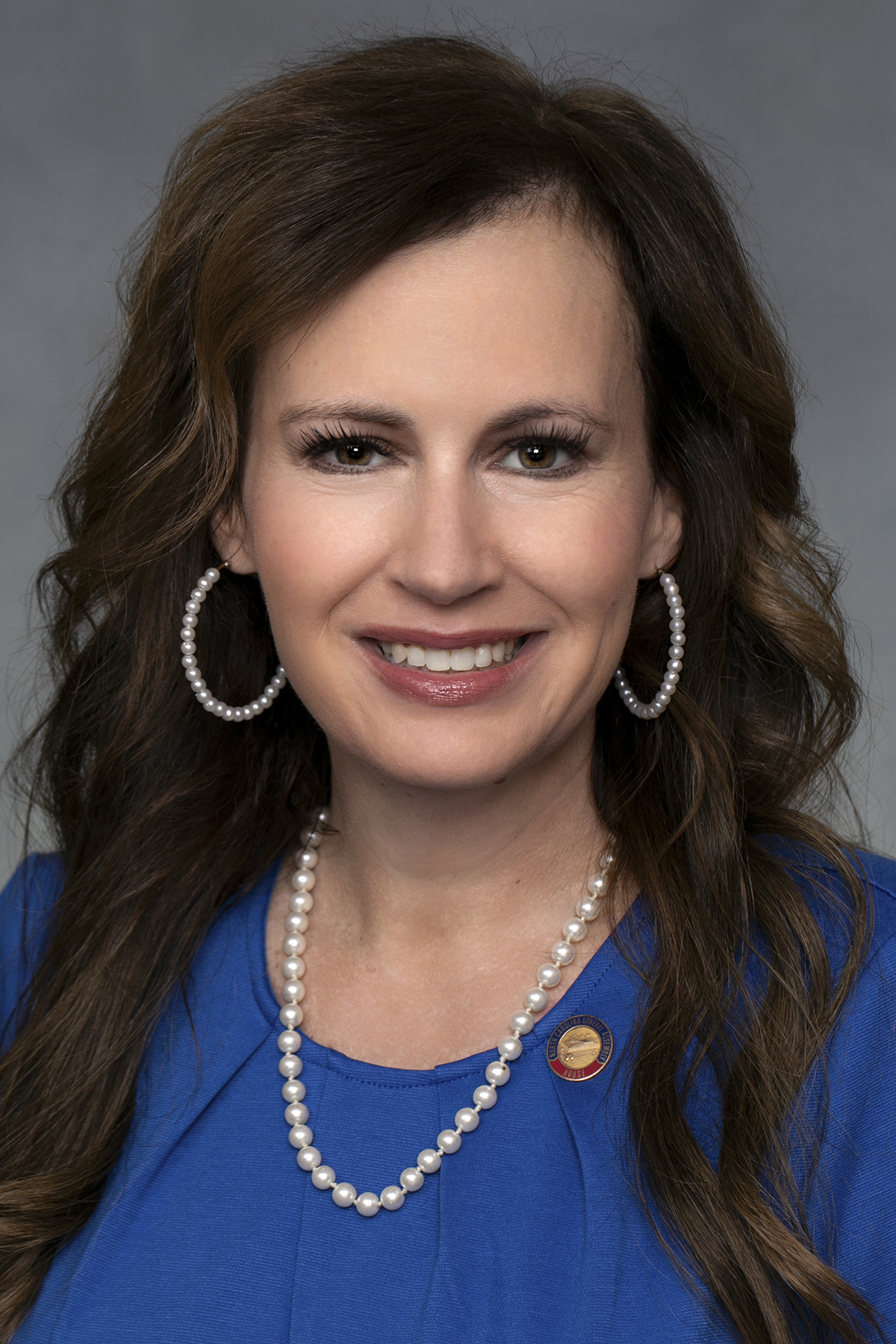

Nominee	Tricia Cotham	Nicole Sidman
Party	Republican	Democratic
Popular vote	27,299	27,086
Percentage	50.20%	49.80%
State Representative before election
Tricia Cotham
Republican
Elected State Representative
Tricia Cotham
Republican

The new 105th district portions of southeastern Mecklenburg County. It includes the home of incumbent Republican Tricia Cotham, who has represented the 112th district since 2023. She was elected as a Democrat, before switching parties on April 5, 2023.

North Carolina House of Representatives 105th district Democratic primary election, 2024
Party	Candidate	Votes	%
Democratic	Nicole Sidman	3,939	57.28%
Democratic	Yolanda Holmes	2,608	37.92%
Democratic	Terry Lansdell	330	4.80%
Total votes		6,877	100%

North Carolina House of Representatives 105th district general election, 2024
Party	Candidate	Votes	%
Republican	Tricia Cotham (incumbent)	27,299	50.20%
Democratic	Nicole Sidman	27,086	49.80%
Total votes		54,385	100%
Republican hold			

==== District 106 ====
2024 North Carolina's 106th House district election
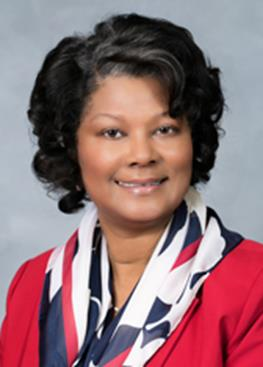
Nominee	Carla Cunningham
Party	Democratic
Popular vote	40,633
Percentage	100%
State Representative before election
Carla Cunningham
Democratic
Elected State Representative
Carla Cunningham
Democratic

The new 106th district includes portions of northern Mecklenburg County. It includes the home of incumbent Democrat Carla Cunningham, who has represented the 106th district since 2013.

North Carolina House of Representatives 106th district Democratic primary election, 2024
Party	Candidate	Votes	%
Democratic	Carla Cunningham (incumbent)	6,209	84.56%
Democratic	Vermanno Bowman	1,134	15.44%
Total votes		7,343	100%

North Carolina House of Representatives 106th district general election, 2024
Party	Candidate	Votes	%
Democratic	Carla Cunningham (incumbent)	40,633	100%
Total votes		40,633	100%
Democratic hold			

==== District 107 ====
2024 North Carolina's 107th House district election
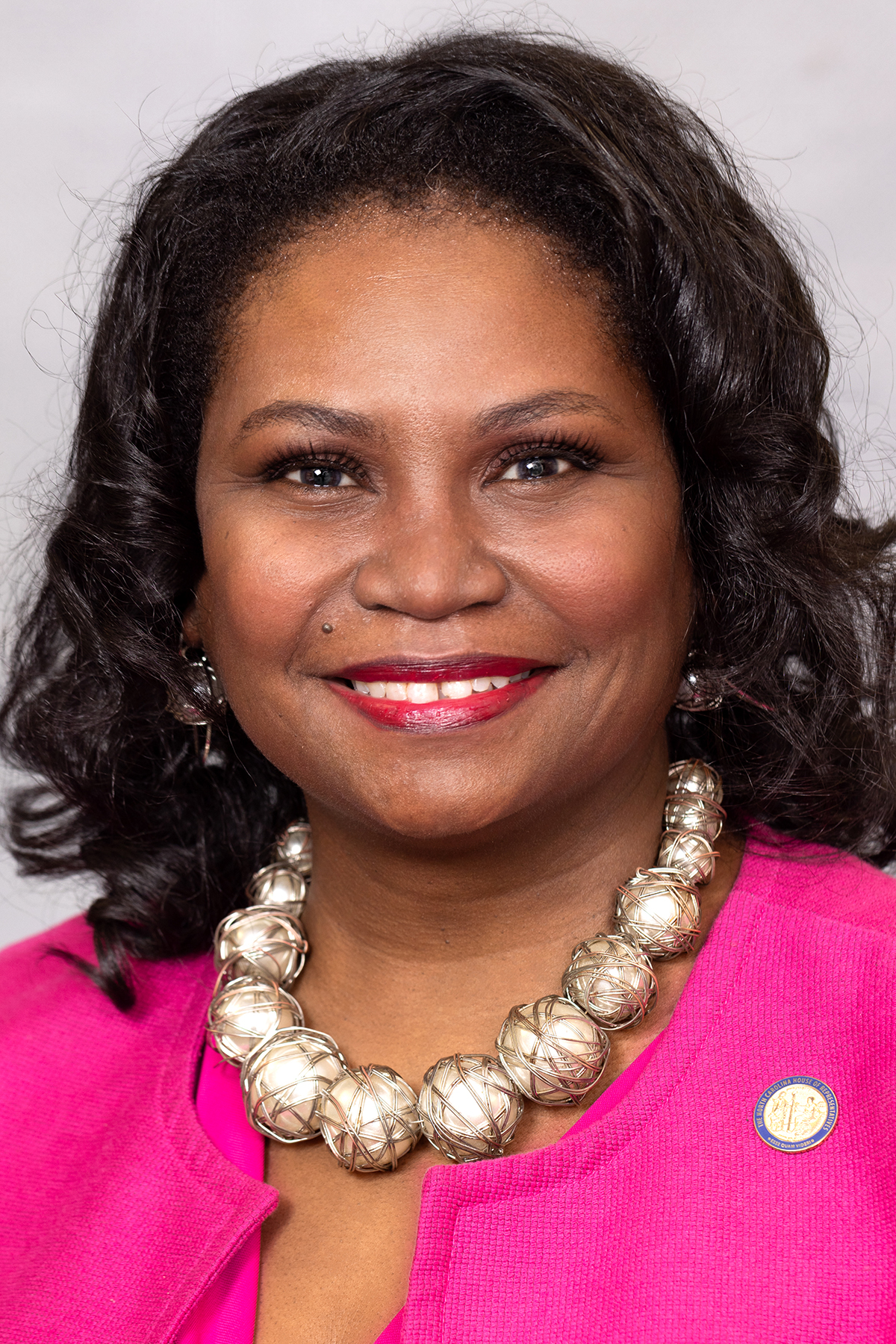
Nominee	Aisha Dew
Party	Democratic
Popular vote	38,603
Percentage	100%
State Representative before election
Bobby Drakeford
Democratic
Elected State Representative
Aisha Dew
Democratic

The new 107th district includes portions of central Mecklenburg County. It includes the home of Democrat Kelly Alexander, who last represented the 107th district since 2009. On December 6, 2023, Alexander announced his intent to retire after eight terms. He died on September 6, 2024. Successor Bobby Drakeford was nominated to finish Alexander's term.

North Carolina House of Representatives 107th district general election, 2024
Party	Candidate	Votes	%
Democratic	Aisha Dew	38,603	100%
Total votes		38,603	100%
Democratic hold			

==== District 108 ====
2024 North Carolina's 108th House district election
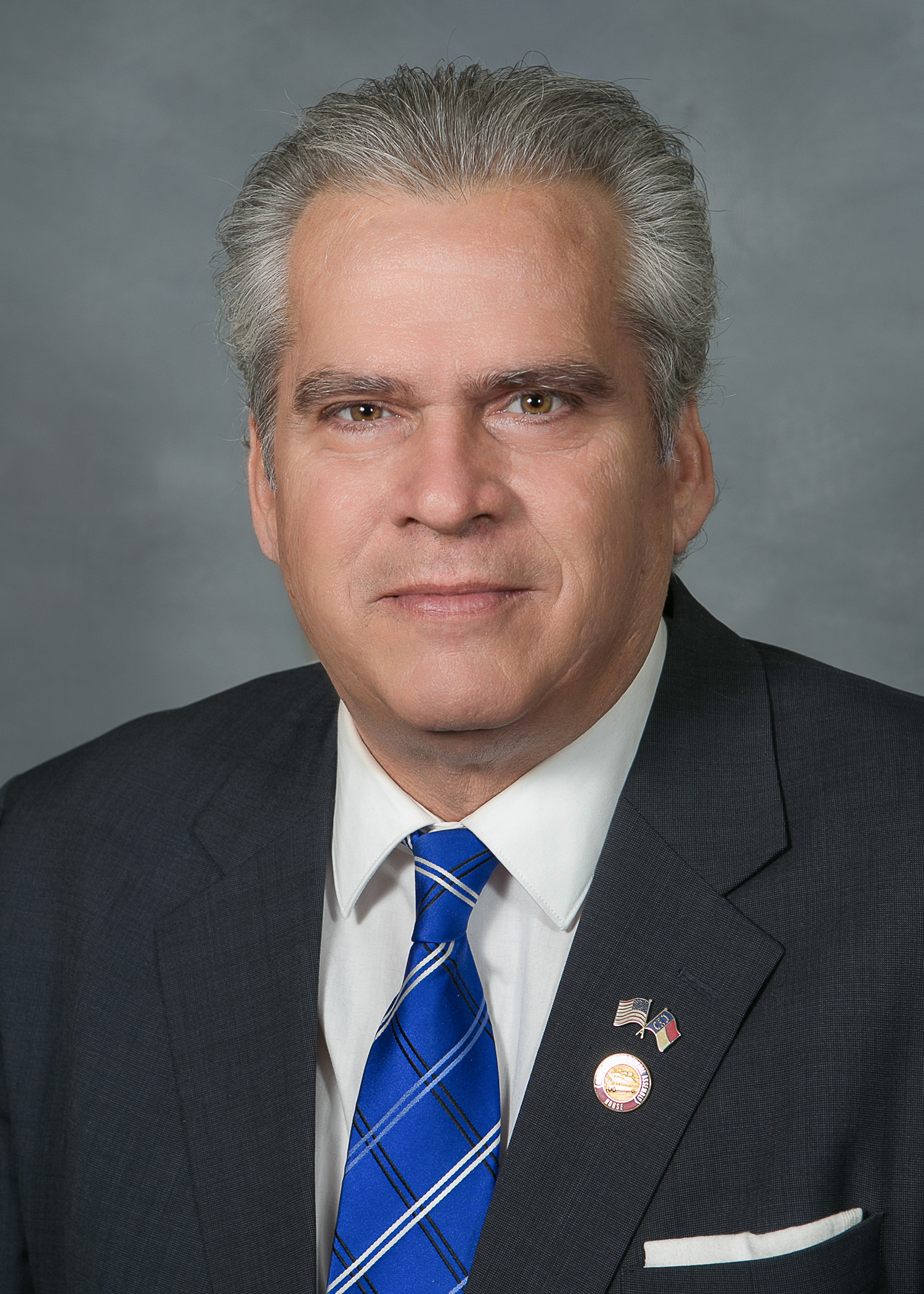

Nominee	John Torbett	Sydnie Hutchinson
Party	Republican	Democratic
Popular vote	28,982	15,892
Percentage	64.59%	35.41%
State Representative before election
John Torbett
Republican
Elected State Representative
John Torbett
Republican

The new 108th district includes portions of northeastern Gaston County. It includes the home of incumbent Republican John Torbett, who has represented the 108th district since 2011.

North Carolina House of Representatives 108th district general election, 2024
Party	Candidate	Votes	%
Republican	John Torbett (incumbent)	28,982	64.59%
Democratic	Sydnie Hutchinson	15,892	35.41%
Total votes		44,874	100%
Republican hold			

==== District 109 ====
2024 North Carolina's 109th House district election
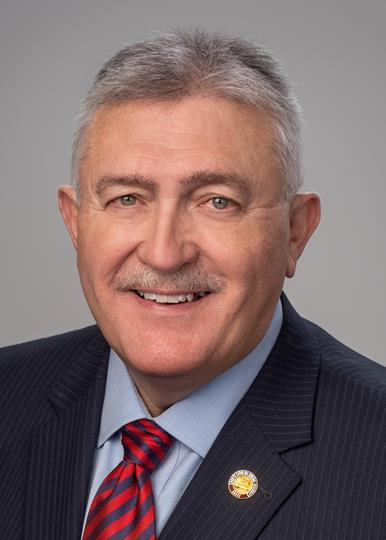

Nominee	Donnie Loftis	Pam Morgenstern
Party	Republican	Democratic
Popular vote	28,167	20,374
Percentage	58.03%	41.97%
State Representative before election
Donnie Loftis
Republican
Elected State Representative
Donnie Loftis
Republican

The new 109th district includes portions of southeastern Gaston County. It includes the home of incumbent Republican Donnie Loftis, who has represented the 109th district since 2021.

North Carolina House of Representatives 109th district general election, 2024
Party	Candidate	Votes	%
Republican	Donnie Loftis (incumbent)	28,167	58.03%
Democratic	Pam Morgenstern	20,374	41.97%
Total votes		48,541	100%
Republican hold			

==== District 110 ====
2024 North Carolina's 110th House district election
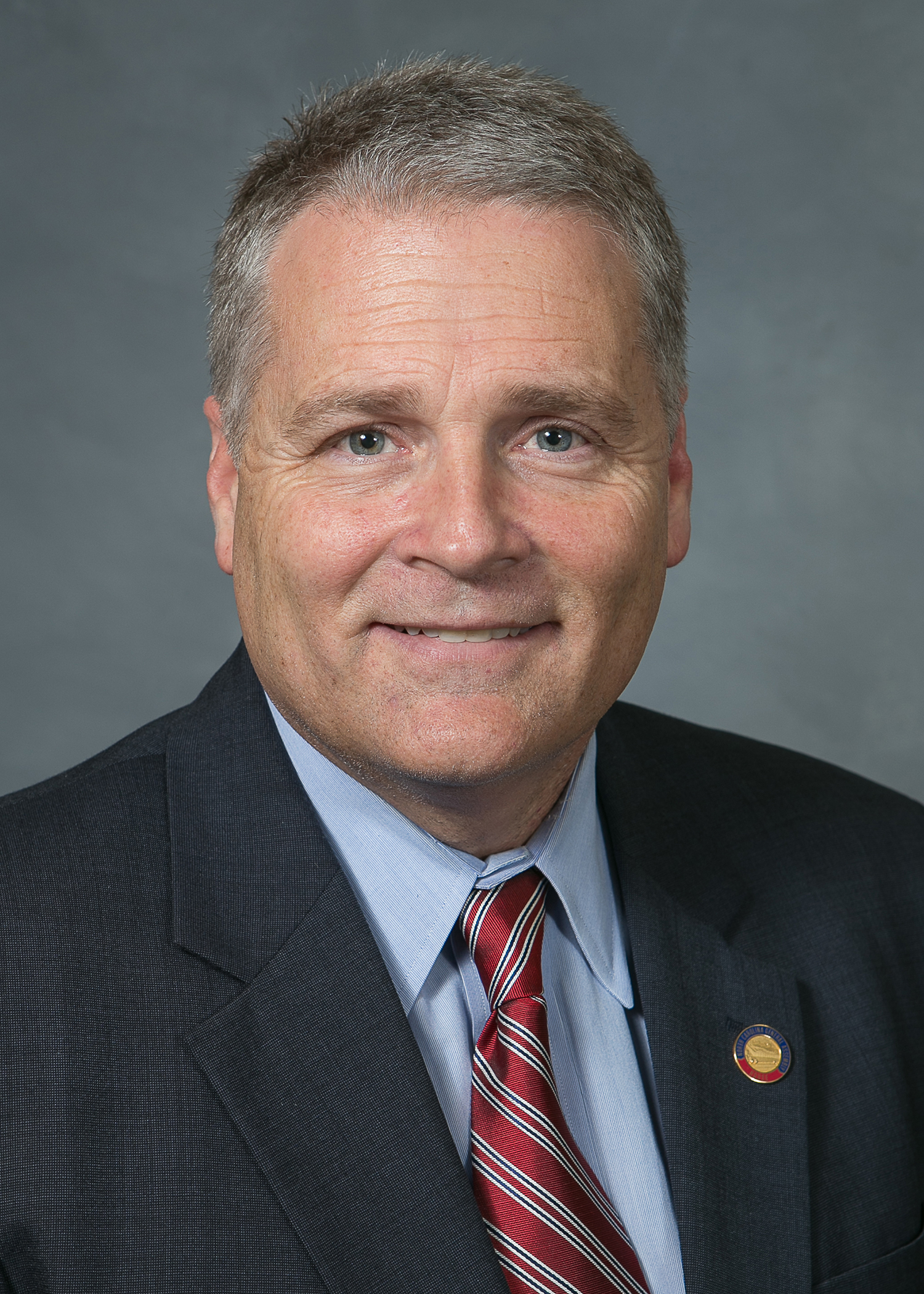

Nominee	Kelly Hastings	Justin Matthews
Party	Republican	Democratic
Popular vote	28,418	14,268
Percentage	66.57%	33.43%
State Representative before election
Kelly Hastings
Republican
Elected State Representative
Kelly Hastings
Republican

The new 110th district includes portions of northern Cleveland County and western Gaston County. It includes the home of incumbent Republican Kelly Hastings, who has represented the 110th district since 2011.

North Carolina House of Representatives 110th district Republican primary election, 2024
Party	Candidate	Votes	%
Republican	Kelly Hastings (incumbent)	7,347	88.15%
Republican	Esther Scott	988	11.85%
Total votes		8,335	100%

North Carolina House of Representatives 110th district general election, 2024
Party	Candidate	Votes	%
Republican	Kelly Hastings (incumbent)	28,418	66.57%
Democratic	Justin Matthews	14,268	33.43%
Total votes		42,686	100%
Republican hold			

==== District 111 ====
2024 North Carolina's 111th House district election
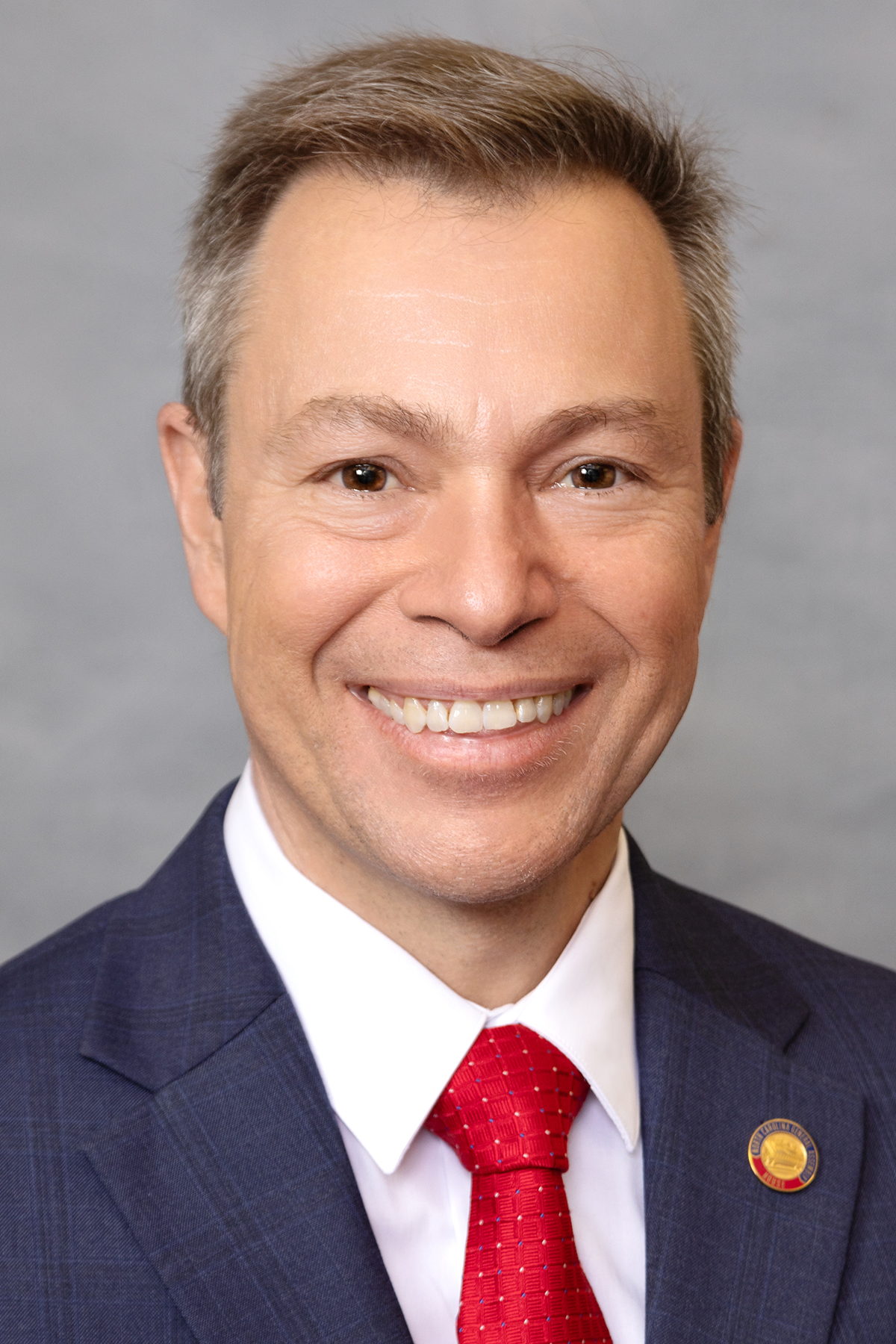

Nominee	Paul Scott	Frances Rollinson Webber
Party	Republican	Democratic
Popular vote	31,434	11,110
Percentage	73.89%	26.11%
State Representative before election
Tim Moore
Republican
Elected State Representative
Paul Scott
Republican

The new 111th district includes portions of southern Cleveland County and eastern Rutherford County. It includes the home of incumbent Republican Speaker of the House Tim Moore, who has represented the 111th district since 2003. On July 19, 2023, Moore announced his intent to retire after eleven terms, announcing a run for Congress on November 7, 2023.

North Carolina House of Representatives 111th district Republican primary election, 2024
Party	Candidate	Votes	%
Republican	Paul Scott	3,648	34.31%
Republican	David Allen	3,239	30.46%
Republican	Paul Brintley	1,985	18.67%
Republican	Scott Neisler	1,760	16.55%
Total votes		10,632	100%

North Carolina House of Representatives 111th district general election, 2024
Party	Candidate	Votes	%
Republican	Paul Scott	31,434	73.89%
Democratic	Frances Rollinson Webber	11,110	26.11%
Total votes		42,544	100%
Republican hold			

==== District 112 ====
2024 North Carolina's 112th House district election
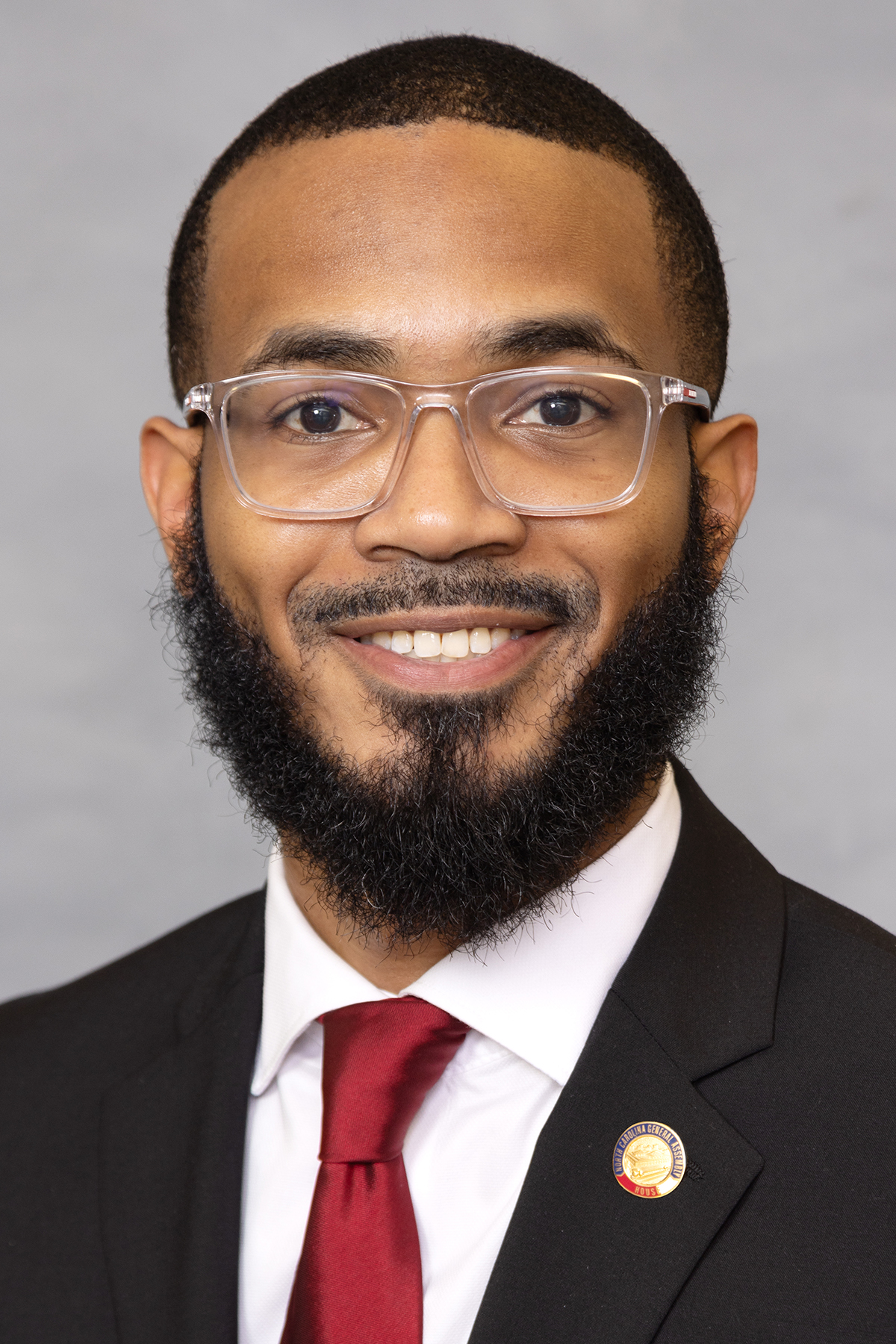
Nominee	Jordan Lopez
Party	Democratic
Popular vote	32,721
Percentage	100%
State Representative before election
New Seat
Elected State Representative
Jordan Lopez
Democratic

The new 112th district includes portions of southeastern Mecklenburg County. It has no incumbent. Democrat Jordan Lopez went uncontested in the primary and general election.

North Carolina House of Representatives 112th district general election, 2024
Party	Candidate	Votes	%
Democratic	Jordan Lopez	32,721	100%
Total votes		32,721	100%
Democratic win (new seat)			

==== District 113 ====
2024 North Carolina's 113th House district election
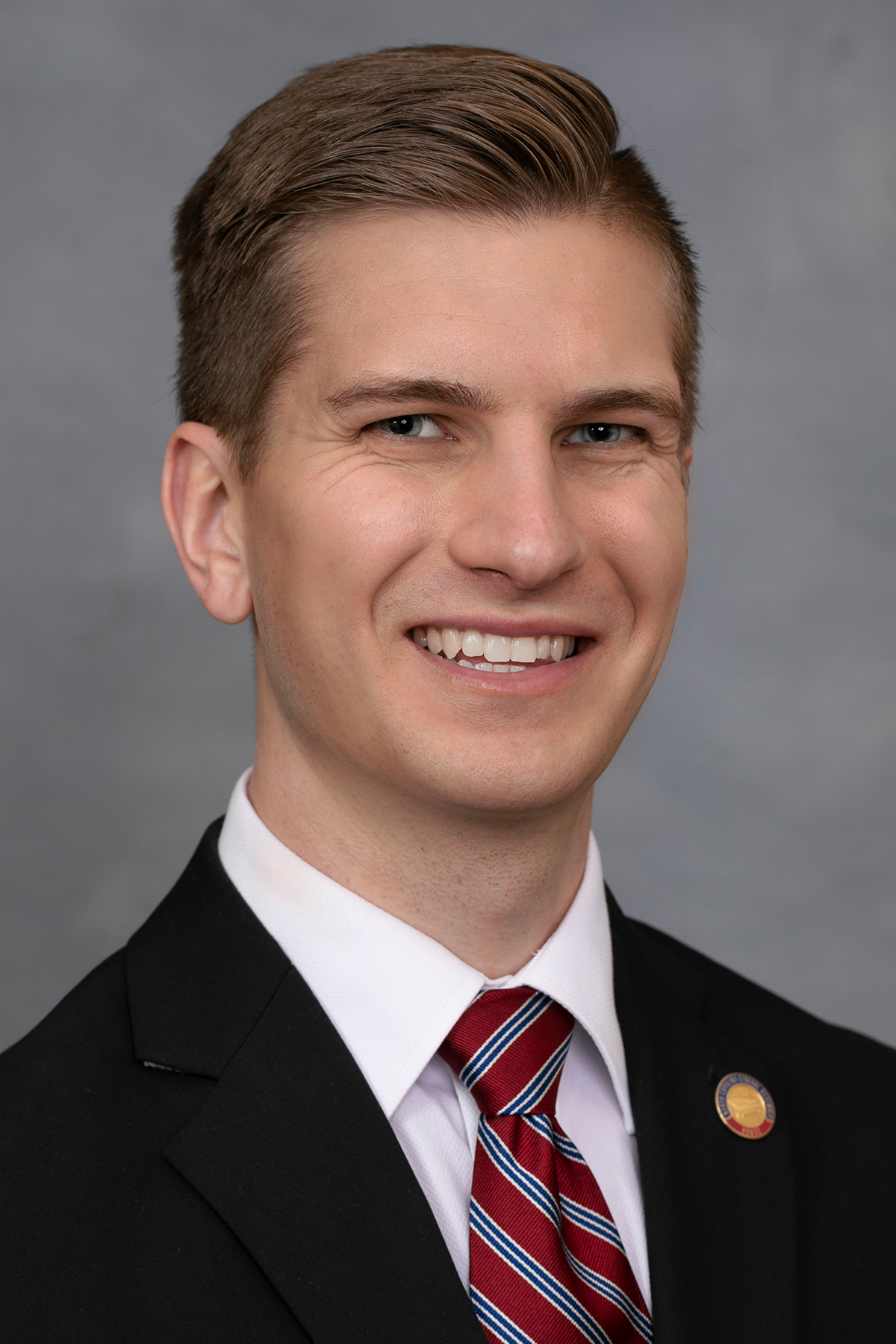

Nominee	Jake Johnson	Michelle Antalec
Party	Republican	Democratic
Popular vote	34,467	17,223
Percentage	66.68%	33.32%
State Representative before election
Jake Johnson
Republican
Elected State Representative
Jake Johnson
Republican

The new 113th district includes all of Polk County, portions of southern Henderson and McDowell counties, and portions of western Rutherford County. It includes the home of incumbent Republican Jake Johnson, who has represented the 113th district since 2019.

North Carolina House of Representatives 113th district general election, 2024
Party	Candidate	Votes	%
Republican	Jake Johnson (incumbent)	34,467	66.68%
Democratic	Michelle Antalec	17,223	33.32%
Total votes		51,690	100%
Republican hold			

==== District 114 ====
2024 North Carolina's 114th House district election
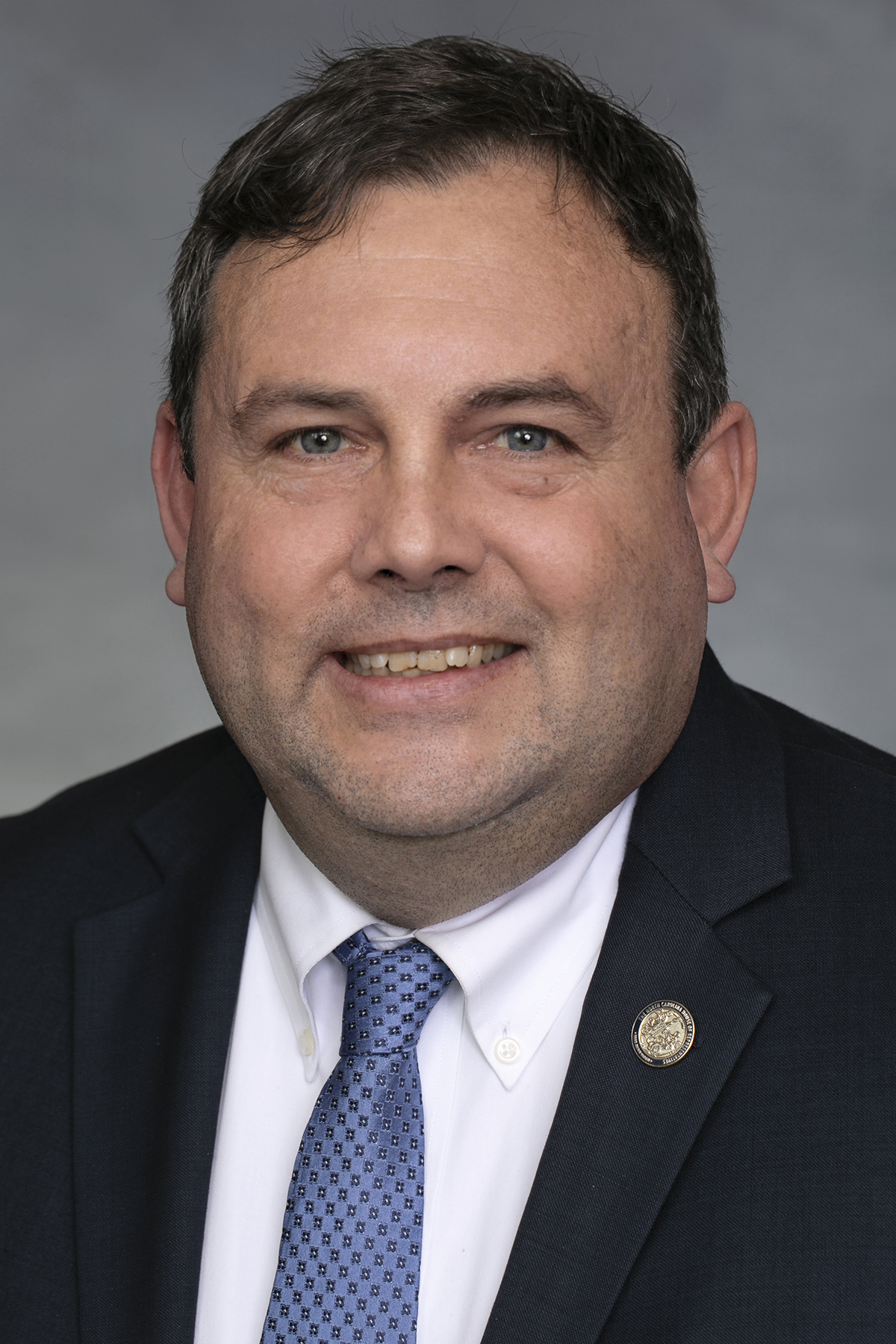

Nominee	Eric Ager	Sherry Higgins
Party	Democratic	Republican
Popular vote	32,441	21,905
Percentage	59.69%	40.31%
State Representative before election
Eric Ager
Democratic
Elected State Representative
Eric Ager
Democratic

The new 114th district includes portions of southern Buncombe County. It includes the home of incumbent Democrat Eric Ager, who has represented the 114th district since 2023.

North Carolina House of Representatives 114th district general election, 2024
Party	Candidate	Votes	%
Democratic	Eric Ager (incumbent)	32,441	59.69%
Republican	Sherry Higgins	21,905	40.31%
Total votes		54,346	100%
Democratic hold			

==== District 115 ====
2024 North Carolina's 115th House district election
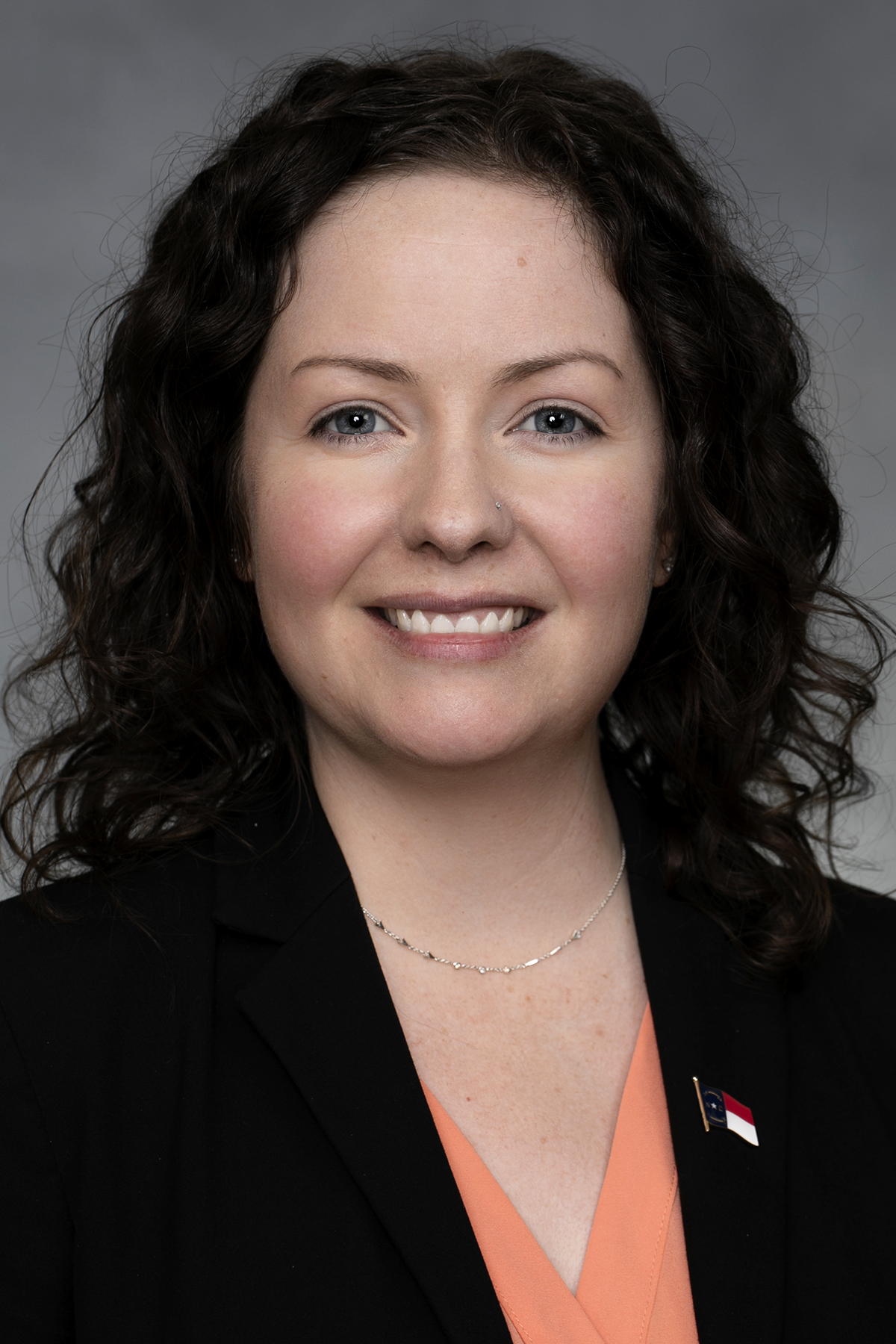

Nominee	Lindsey Prather	Ruth Smith
Party	Democratic	Republican
Popular vote	26,203	24,720
Percentage	51.46%	48.54%
- Prather: 50–60% 60–70% Smith: 40-50% 50–60%
State Representative before election
Lindsey Prather
Democratic
Elected State Representative
Lindsey Prather
Democratic

The new 115th district includes portions of northern Buncombe County. It includes the home of incumbent Democrat Lindsey Prather, who has represented the 115th district since 2023.

North Carolina House of Representatives 115th district general election, 2024
Party	Candidate	Votes	%
Democratic	Lindsey Prather (incumbent)	26,203	51.46%
Republican	Ruth Smith	24,720	48.54%
Total votes		50,923	100%
Democratic hold			

==== District 116 ====
2024 North Carolina's 116th House district election
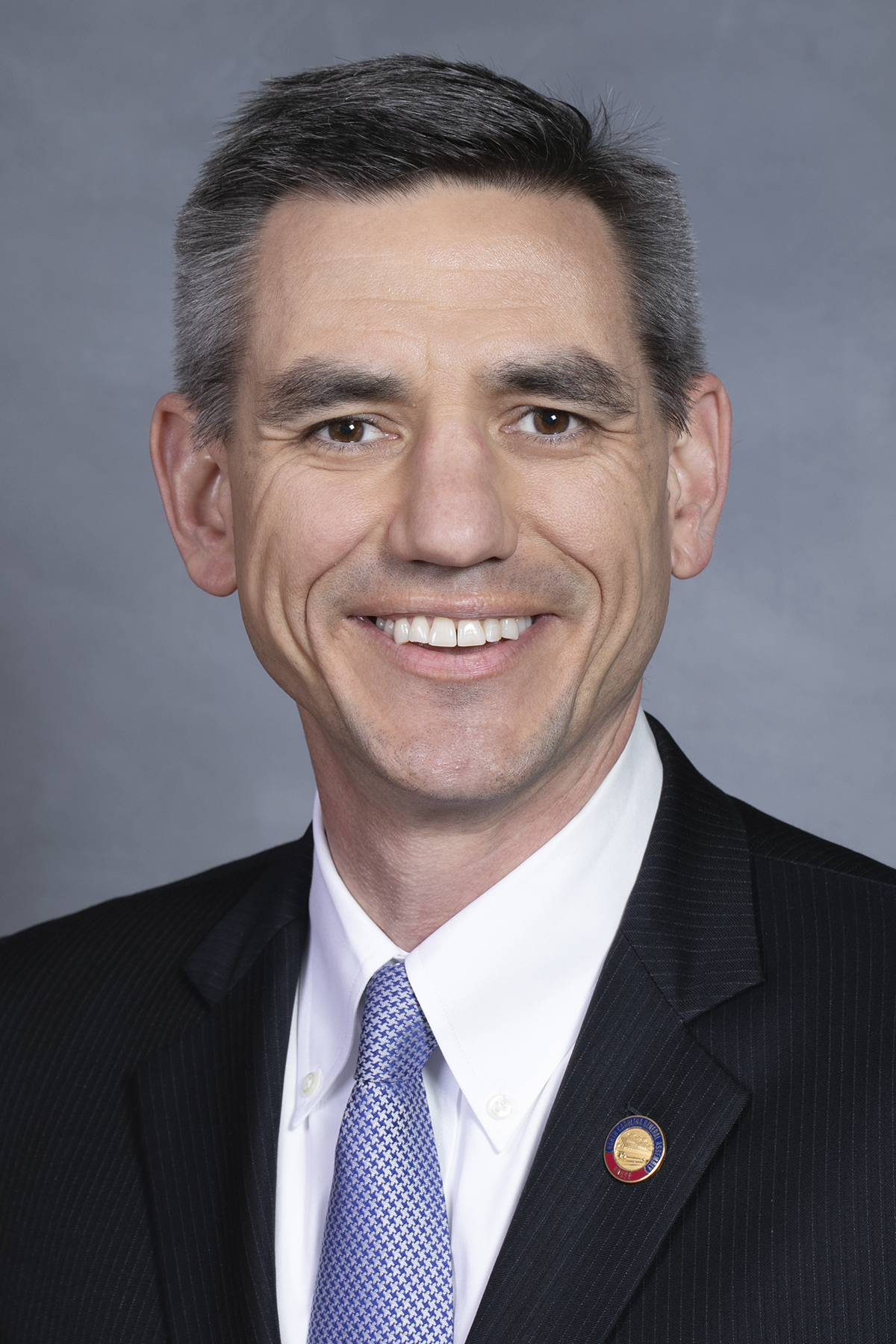
Nominee	Brian Turner
Party	Democratic
Popular vote	42,815
Percentage	100%
State Representative before election
Caleb Rudow
Democratic
Elected State Representative
Brian Turner
Democratic

The new 116th district includes portions of central Buncombe County. It includes the home of incumbent Democrat Caleb Rudow, who has represented the 116th district and its predecessors since 2022. On November 28, 2023, Rudow announced his intent to retire after one term to run for Congress.

Former Representative Brian Turner went uncontested in the primary and general elections.

North Carolina House of Representatives 116th district general election, 2024
Party	Candidate	Votes	%
Democratic	Brian Turner	42,815	100%
Total votes		42,815	100%
Democratic hold			

==== District 117 ====
2024 North Carolina's 117th House district election
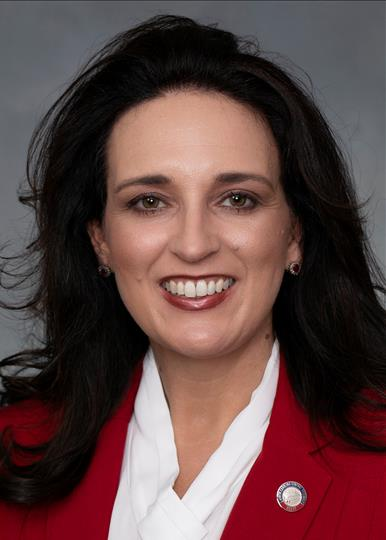

Nominee	Jennifer Balkcom	Steve Martinez
Party	Republican	Democratic
Popular vote	30,603	22,390
Percentage	57.75%	42.25%
State Representative before election
Jennifer Balkcom
Republican
Elected State Representative
Jennifer Balkcom
Republican

The new 117th district includes portions of northern Henderson County. It includes the home of incumbent Republican Jennifer Balkcom, who has represented the 117th district since 2023.

North Carolina House of Representatives 117th district general election, 2024
Party	Candidate	Votes	%
Republican	Jennifer Balkcom (incumbent)	30,603	57.75%
Democratic	Steve Martinez	22,390	42.25%
Total votes		52,993	100%
Republican hold			

==== District 118 ====
2024 North Carolina's 118th House district election
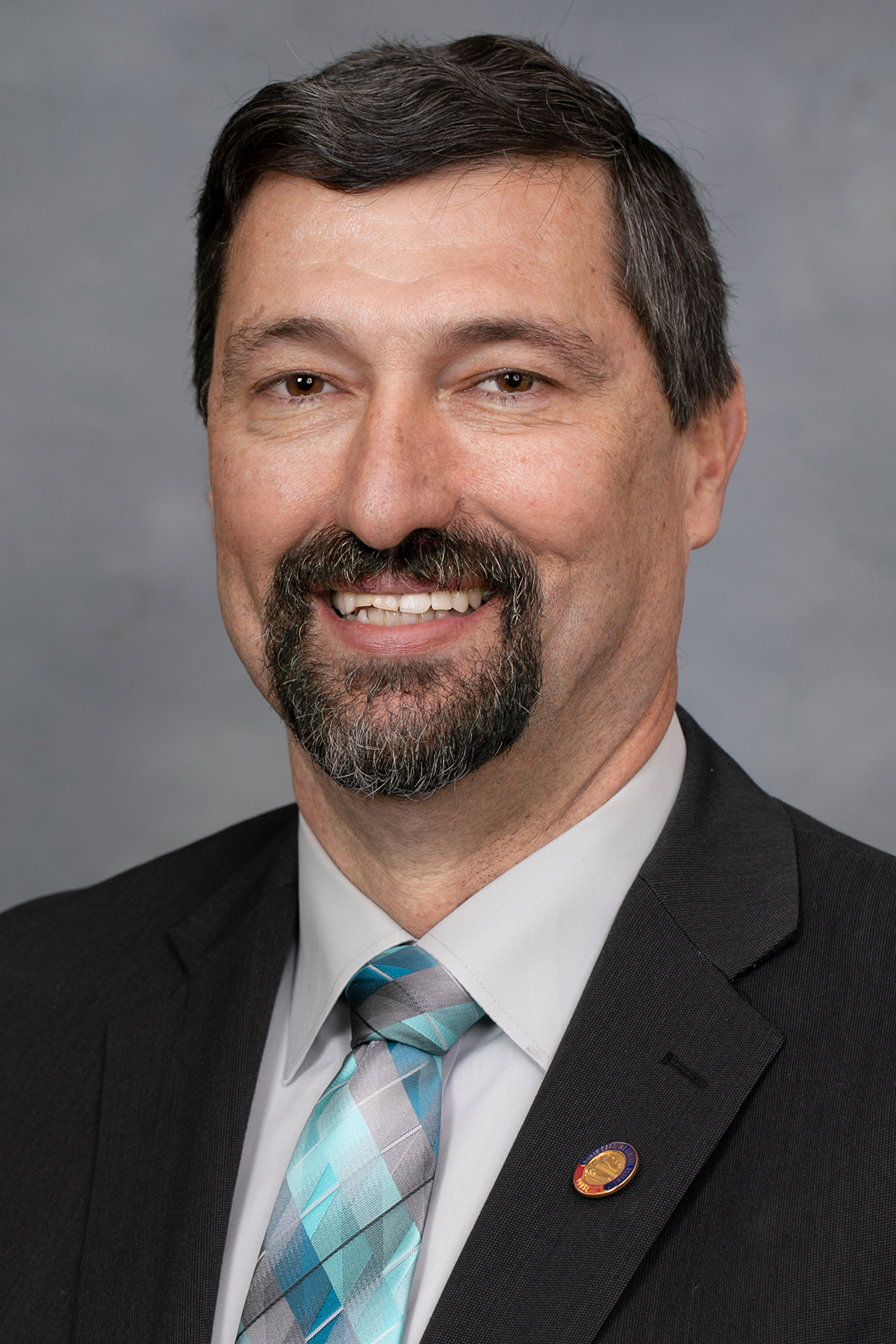

Nominee	Mark Pless	Evelyn Davidson
Party	Republican	Democratic
Popular vote	30,807	19,480
Percentage	61.26%	38.74%
State Representative before election
Mark Pless
Republican
Elected State Representative
Mark Pless
Republican

The new 118th district includes all of Haywood and Madison counties. It includes the home of incumbent Republican Mark Pless, who has represented the 118th district since 2021.

North Carolina House of Representatives 118th district general election, 2024
Party	Candidate	Votes	%
Republican	Mark Pless (incumbent)	30,807	61.26%
Democratic	Evelyn Davidson	19,480	38.74%
Total votes		50,287	100%
Republican hold			

==== District 119 ====
2024 North Carolina's 119th House district election
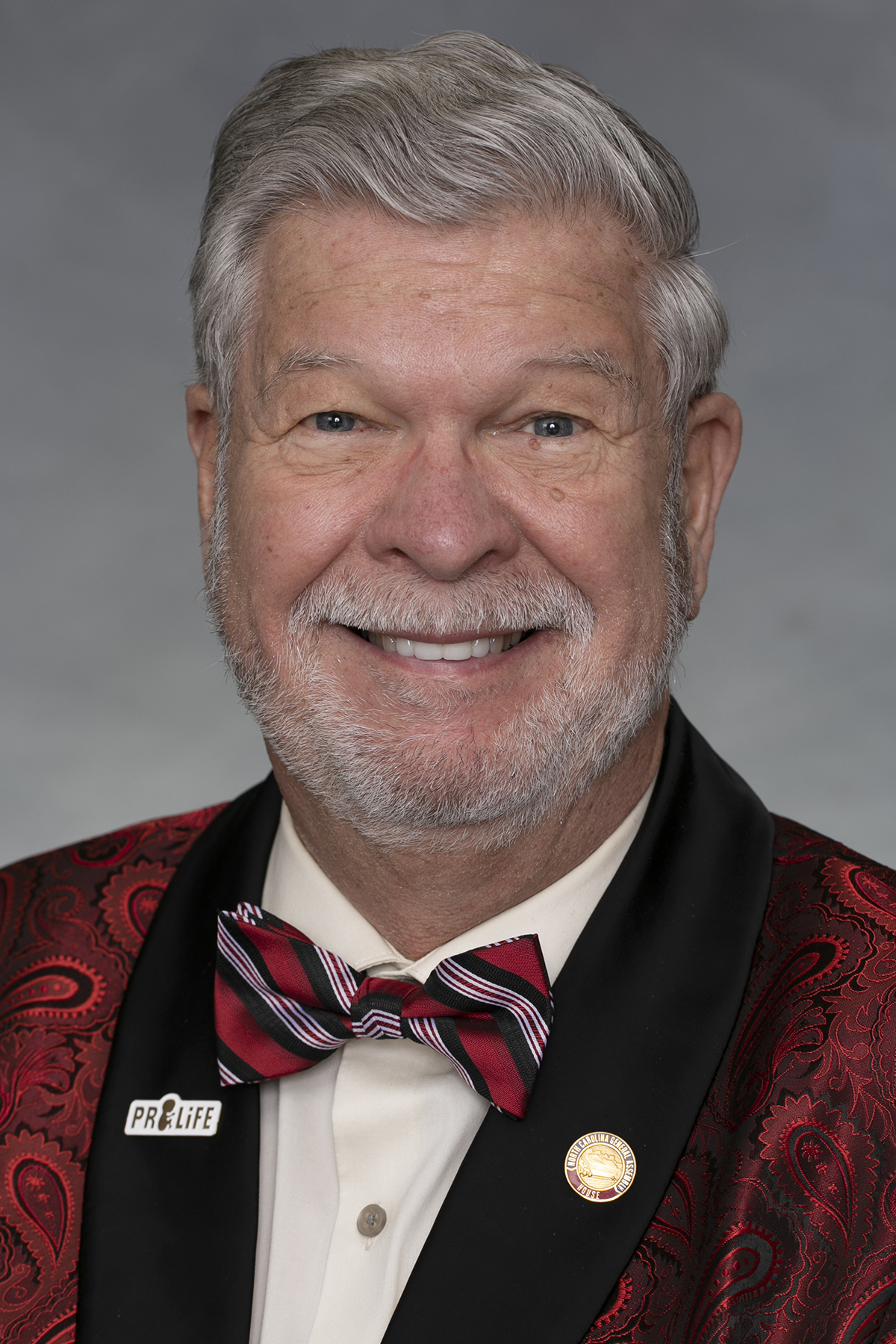

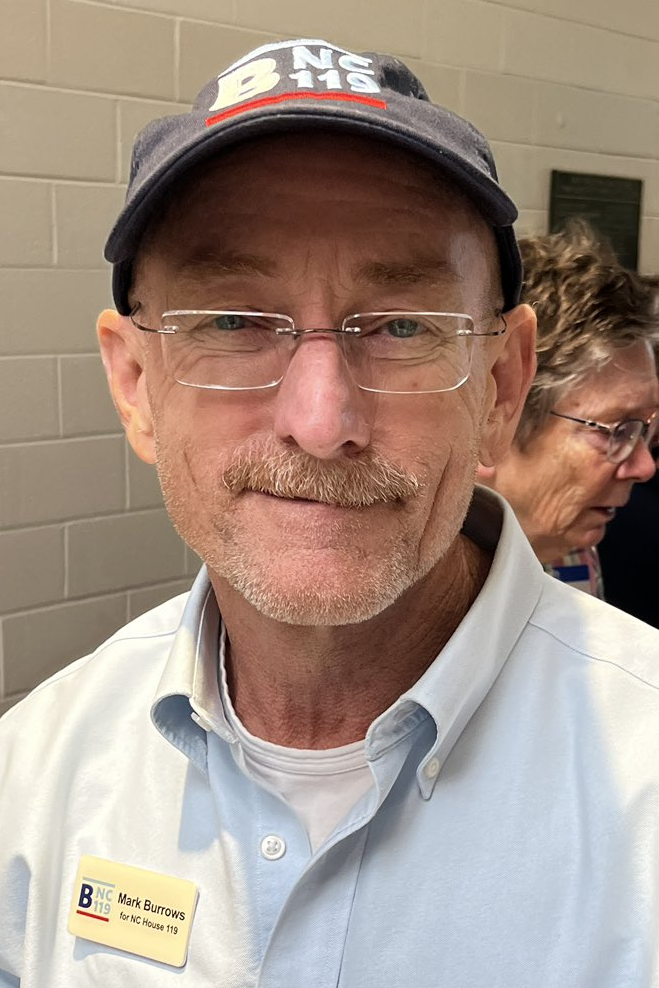
Nominee	Mike Clampitt	Mark Burrows
Party	Republican	Democratic
Popular vote	26,871	21,641
Percentage	55.39%	44.61%
- Clampitt: 50–60% 60–70%
State Representative before election
Mike Clampitt
Republican
Elected State Representative
Mike Clampitt
Republican

The new 119th district includes all of Jackson, Swain, and Transylvania counties. It includes the home of incumbent Republican Mike Clampitt, who has represented the 119th district since 2021.

North Carolina House of Representatives 119th district general election, 2024
Party	Candidate	Votes	%
Republican	Mike Clampitt (incumbent)	26,871	55.39%
Democratic	Mark Burrows	21,641	44.61%
Total votes		48,512	100%
Republican hold			

==== District 120 ====
2024 North Carolina's 120th House district election
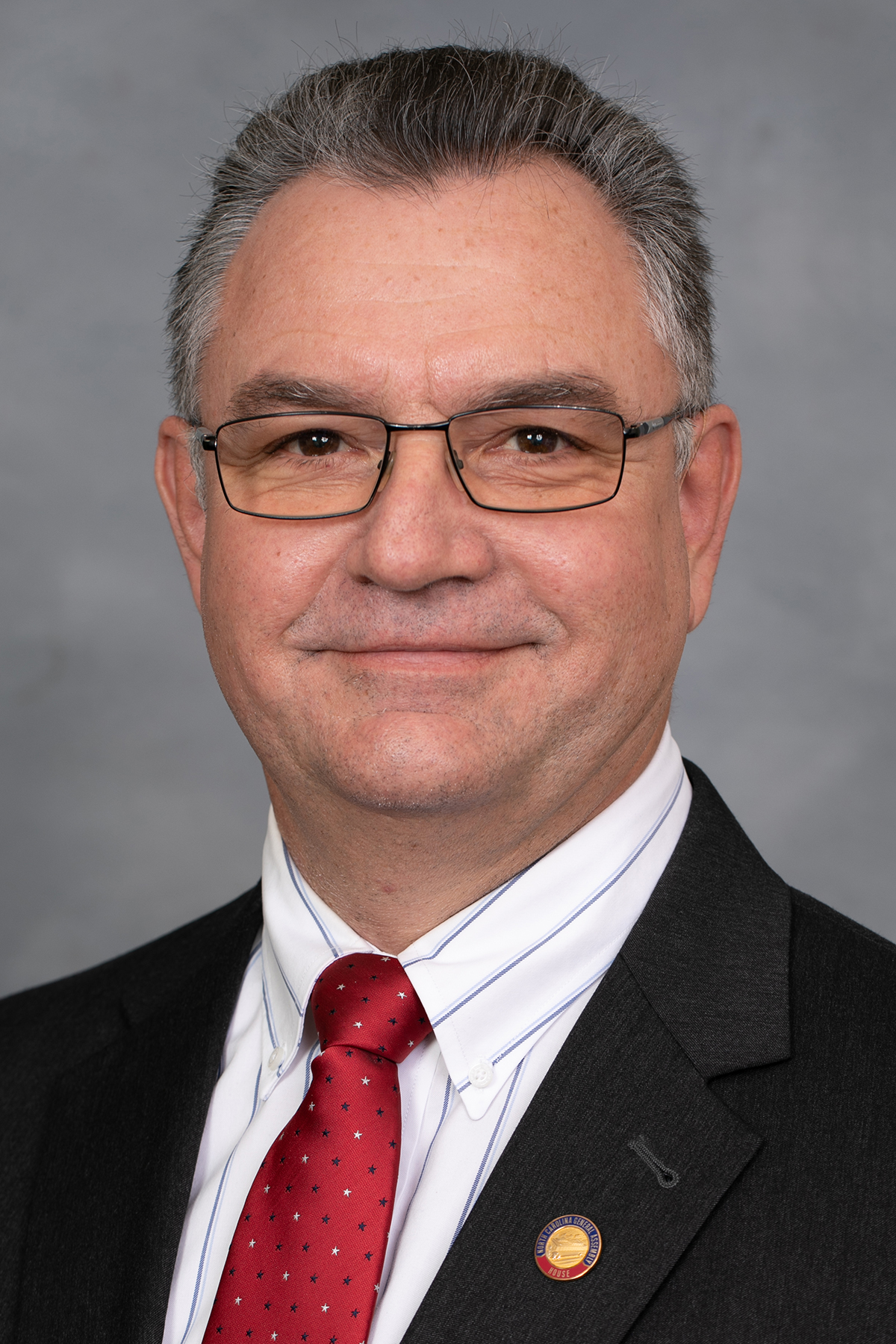

Nominee	Karl Gillespie	Nancy Curtis
Party	Republican	Democratic
Popular vote	38,040	12,572
Percentage	75.16%	24.84%
State Representative before election
Karl Gillespie
Republican
Elected State Representative
Karl Gillespie
Republican

The new 120th district includes all of Cherokee, Clay, Graham, and Macon counties. It includes the home of incumbent Republican Karl Gillespie, who has represented the 120th district since 2021.

North Carolina House of Representatives 120th district general election, 2024
Party	Candidate	Votes	%
Republican	Karl Gillespie (incumbent)	38,040	75.16%
Democratic	Nancy Curtis	12,572	24.84%
Total votes		50,612	100%
Republican hold			

== See also ==
- 2024 North Carolina elections
- 2024 North Carolina Senate election
- List of North Carolina state legislatures
