= 2016 North Carolina House of Representatives election =

- November 8, 2016

All 120 seats in the North Carolina House of Representatives 61 seats needed for a majority
- Turnout: 68.98%
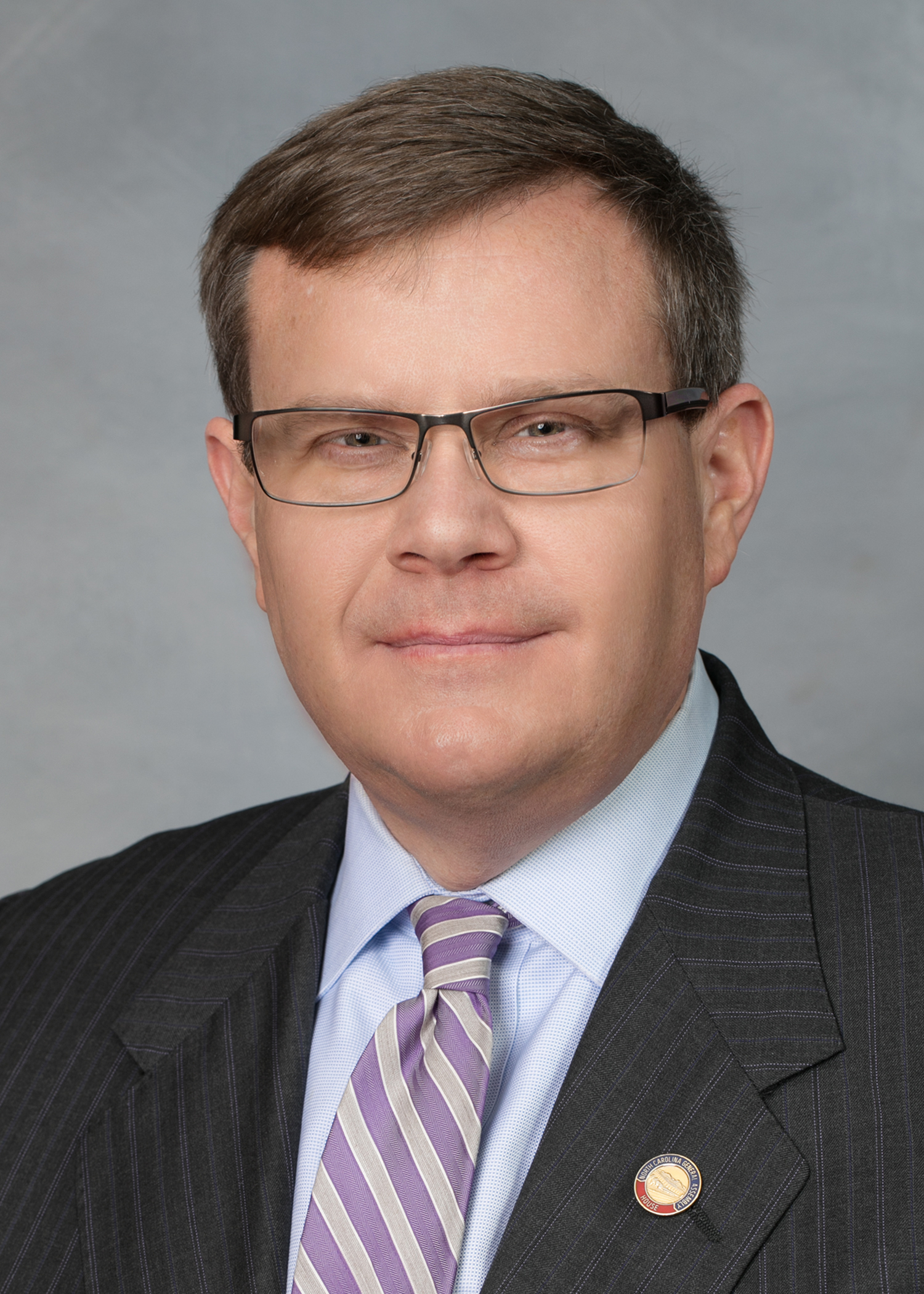

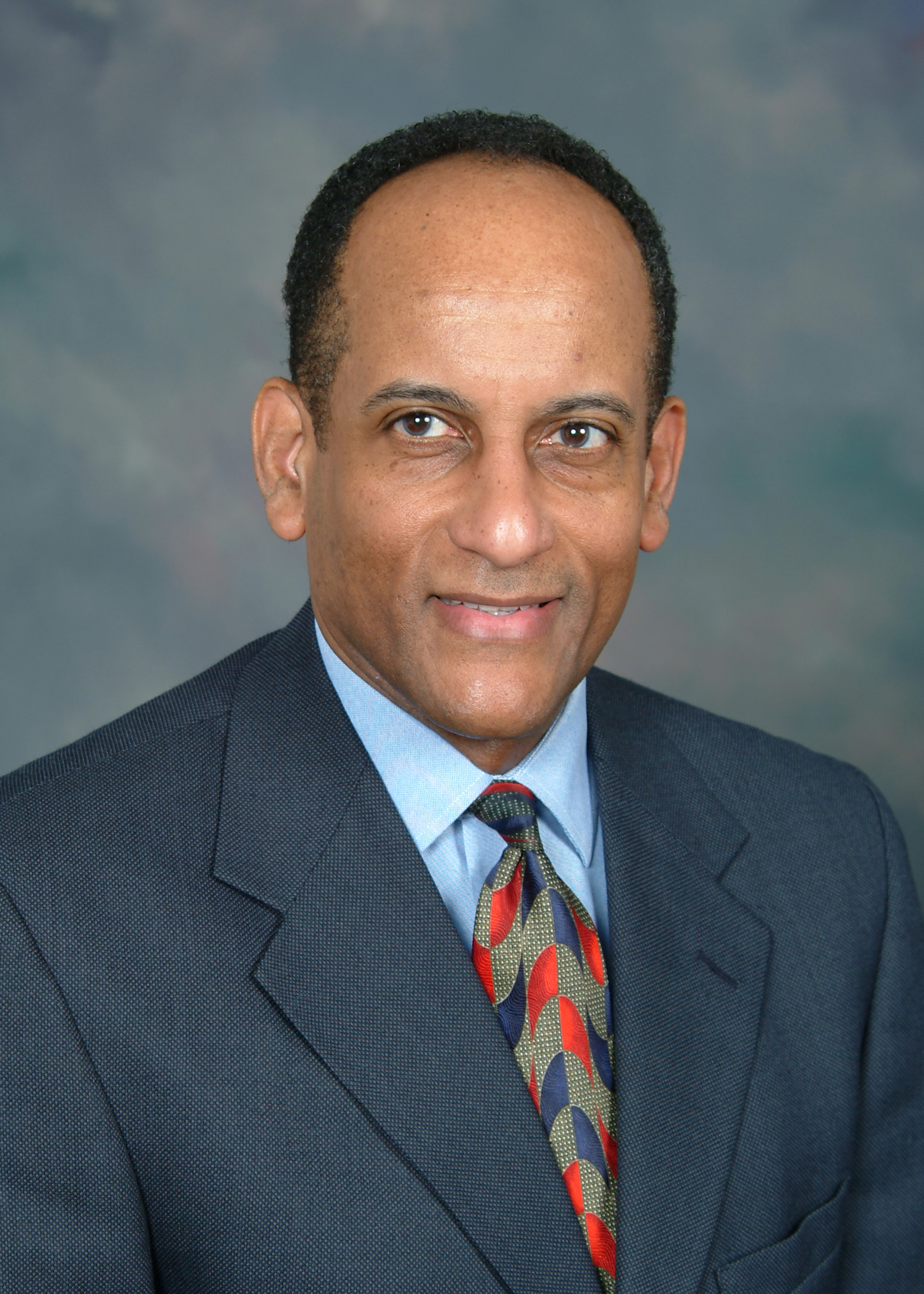
	Majority party	Minority party
Leader	Tim Moore	Larry Hall
Party	Republican	Democratic
Leader since	January 14, 2015	January 1, 2013
Leader's seat	111th - Kings Mountain	29th - Durham
Last election	74	46
Seats before	74	45 (Note: One Democrat elected in 2014, Paul Tine, changed his registration to unaffiliated in 2015.)
Seats won	74	46
Seat change	Steady	▲1
Popular vote	2,150,258	1,929,943
Percentage	52.01%	46.68%
- Results: Democratic hold Democratic gain Republican hold Republican gain
Speaker before election
Tim Moore
Republican
Elected Speaker
Tim Moore
Republican

An election was held on November 8, 2016, to elect all 120 members to North Carolina's House of Representatives. The election coincided with elections for other offices, including U.S. President, U.S. Senate, U.S. House of Representatives, state governor and state senate. The primary election was held on March 15, 2016.

There was no change in the composition of the House (compared to the results of the 2014 elections) as Republicans retained their three-fifths supermajority, winning 74 seats compared to 46 seats for the Democrats.

== Results summary ==
District	Incumbent	Party	Elected	Party
1st	Bob Steinburg	Rep	Bob Steinburg	Rep
2nd	Larry Yarborough	Rep	Larry Yarborough	Rep
3rd	Michael Speciale	Rep	Michael Speciale	Rep
4th	Jimmy Dixon	Rep	Jimmy Dixon	Rep
5th	Howard Hunter III	Dem	Howard Hunter III	Dem
6th	Paul Tine	Ind	Beverly Boswell	Rep
7th	Bobbie Richardson	Dem	Bobbie Richardson	Dem
8th	Susan Martin	Rep	Susan Martin	Rep
9th	Greg Murphy	Rep	Greg Murphy	Rep
10th	John Bell	Rep	John Bell	Rep
11th	Duane Hall	Dem	Duane Hall	Dem
12th	George Graham	Dem	George Graham	Dem
13th	Pat McElraft	Rep	Pat McElraft	Rep
14th	George Cleveland	Rep	George Cleveland	Rep
15th	Phil Shepard	Rep	Phil Shepard	Rep
16th	Chris Millis	Rep	Chris Millis	Rep
17th	Frank Iler	Rep	Frank Iler	Rep
18th	Susi Hamilton	Dem	Susi Hamilton	Dem
19th	Ted Davis Jr.	Rep	Ted Davis Jr.	Rep
20th	Holly Grange	Rep	Holly Grange	Rep
21st	Larry Bell	Dem	Larry Bell	Dem
22nd	William Brisson	Dem	William Brisson	Dem
23rd	Shelly Willingham	Dem	Shelly Willingham	Dem
24th	Jean Farmer-Butterfield	Dem	Jean Farmer-Butterfield	Dem
25th	Jeff Collins	Rep	Jeff Collins	Rep
26th	Leo Daughtry†	Rep	Donna McDowell White	Rep
27th	Michael Wray	Dem	Michael Wray	Dem
28th	James Langdon Jr.†	Rep	Larry Strickland	Rep
29th	Larry Hall	Dem	Larry Hall	Dem
30th	Paul Luebke	Dem	Paul Luebke	Dem
31st	Mickey Michaux	Dem	Mickey Michaux	Dem
32nd	Nathan Baskerville†	Dem	Terry Garrison	Dem
33rd	Rosa Gill	Dem	Rosa Gill	Dem
34th	Grier Martin	Dem	Grier Martin	Dem
35th	Chris Malone	Rep	Chris Malone	Rep
36th	Nelson Dollar	Rep	Nelson Dollar	Rep
37th	Paul Stam†	Rep	Linda Hunt Williams	Rep
38th	Yvonne Lewis Holley	Dem	Yvonne Lewis Holley	Dem
39th	Darren Jackson	Dem	Darren Jackson	Dem
40th	Marilyn Avila	Rep	Joe John	Dem
41st	Gale Adcock	Dem	Gale Adcock	Dem
42nd	Marvin Lucas	Dem	Marvin Lucas	Dem
43rd	Elmer Floyd	Dem	Elmer Floyd	Dem
44th	Billy Richardson	Dem	Billy Richardson	Dem
45th	John Szoka	Rep	John Szoka	Rep
46th	Ken Waddell†	Dem	Brenden Jones	Rep
47th	Charles Graham	Dem	Charles Graham	Dem
48th	Garland Pierce	Dem	Garland Pierce	Dem
49th	Gary Pendleton	Rep	Cynthia Ball	Dem
50th	Graig Meyer	Dem	Graig Meyer	Dem
51st	Brad Salmon	Dem	John Sauls	Rep
52nd	Jamie Boles	Rep	Jamie Boles	Rep
53rd	David Lewis	Rep	David Lewis	Rep
54th	Robert Reives	Dem	Robert Reives	Dem
55th	Mark Brody	Rep	Mark Brody	Rep
56th	Verla Insko	Dem	Verla Insko	Dem
57th	Pricey Harrison	Dem	Pricey Harrison	Dem
58th	Chris Sgro†	Dem	Amos Quick	Dem
59th	Jon Hardister	Rep	Jon Hardister	Rep
60th	Cecil Brockman	Dem	Cecil Brockman	Dem
61st	John Faircloth	Rep	John Faircloth	Rep
62nd	John Blust	Rep	John Blust	Rep
63rd	Stephen Ross	Rep	Stephen Ross	Rep
64th	Dennis Riddell	Rep	Dennis Riddell	Rep
65th	Bert Jones	Rep	Bert Jones	Rep
66th	Ken Goodman	Dem	Ken Goodman	Dem
67th	Justin Burr	Rep	Justin Burr	Rep
68th	Craig Horn	Rep	Craig Horn	Rep
69th	Dean Arp	Rep	Dean Arp	Rep
70th	Pat Hurley	Rep	Pat Hurley	Rep
71st	Evelyn Terry	Dem	Evelyn Terry	Dem
72nd	Ed Hanes	Dem	Ed Hanes	Dem
73rd	Lee Zachary	Rep	Lee Zachary	Rep
74th	Debra Conrad	Rep	Debra Conrad	Rep
75th	Donny Lambeth	Rep	Donny Lambeth	Rep
76th	Carl Ford	Rep	Carl Ford	Rep
77th	Harry Warren	Rep	Harry Warren	Rep
78th	Allen McNeill	Rep	Allen McNeill	Rep
79th	Julia Craven Howard	Rep	Julia Craven Howard	Rep
80th	Sam Watford	Rep	Sam Watford	Rep
81st	Rayne Brown†	Rep	Larry Potts	Rep
82nd	Larry Pittman	Rep	Larry Pittman	Rep
83rd	Linda Johnson	Rep	Linda Johnson	Rep
84th	Rena Turner	Rep	Rena Turner	Rep
85th	Josh Dobson	Rep	Josh Dobson	Rep
86th	Hugh Blackwell	Rep	Hugh Blackwell	Rep
87th	George Robinson	Rep	Destin Hall	Rep
88th	Rob Bryan	Rep	Mary Belk	Dem
89th	Mitchell Setzer	Rep	Mitchell Setzer	Rep
90th	Sarah Stevens	Rep	Sarah Stevens	Rep
91st	Kyle Hall	Rep	Kyle Hall	Rep
92nd	Justin Moore†	Rep	Chaz Beasley	Dem
93rd	Jonathan Jordan	Rep	Jonathan Jordan	Rep
94th	Jeffrey Elmore	Rep	Jeffrey Elmore	Rep
95th	John Fraley	Rep	John Fraley	Rep
96th	Jay Adams	Rep	Jay Adams	Rep
97th	Jason Saine	Rep	Jason Saine	Rep
98th	John Bradford	Rep	John Bradford	Rep
99th	Rodney Moore	Dem	Rodney Moore	Dem
100th	Tricia Cotham†	Dem	John Autry	Dem
101st	Beverly Earle	Dem	Beverly Earle	Dem
102nd	Becky Carney	Dem	Becky Carney	Dem
103rd	Bill Brawley	Rep	Bill Brawley	Rep
104th	Dan Bishop†	Rep	Andy Dulin	Rep
105th	Scott Stone	Rep	Scott Stone	Rep
106th	Carla Cunningham	Dem	Carla Cunningham	Dem
107th	Kelly Alexander	Dem	Kelly Alexander	Dem
108th	John Torbett	Rep	John Torbett	Rep
109th	Dana Bumgardner	Rep	Dana Bumgardner	Rep
110th	Kelly Hastings	Rep	Kelly Hastings	Rep
111th	Tim Moore	Rep	Tim Moore	Rep
112th	David Rogers	Rep	David Rogers	Rep
113th	Chris Whitmire†	Rep	Cody Henson	Rep
114th	Susan Fisher	Dem	Susan Fisher	Dem
115th	John Ager	Dem	John Ager	Dem
116th	Brian Turner	Dem	Brian Turner	Dem
117th	Chuck McGrady	Rep	Chuck McGrady	Rep
118th	Michele Presnell	Rep	Michele Presnell	Rep
119th	Joe Sam Queen	Dem	Mike Clampitt	Rep
120th	Roger West†	Rep	Kevin Corbin	Rep

† - Incumbent not seeking re-election

=== Statewide ===
Party	Candi- dates	Votes		Seats		
Party	Candi- dates	No.	%	No.	+/–	%
Republican Party	89	2,150,258	52.01%	74	Steady	61.67%
Democratic Party	91	1,929,943	46.68%	46	Steady	38.33%
Independent	3	36,273	0.88%	0	Steady	0.00%
Libertarian Party	6	16,102	0.39%	0	Steady	0.00%
Write-in	2	1,810	0.04%	0	Steady	0.00%
Total	191	4,134,386	100.00%	120	Steady	100.00%

Popular vote
Republican	52.01%
Democratic	46.68%
Other	1.31%

House seats
Republican	61.67%
Democratic	38.33%

=== Incumbents defeated in general election ===
==== Democrats ====
- Brad Salmon (D-District 51), defeated by John Sauls (R)
- Joe Sam Queen (D-District 119), defeated by Mike Clampitt (R)

==== Republicans ====
- Marilyn Avila (R-District 40), defeated by Joe John (D)
- Gary Pendleton (R-District 49), defeated by Cynthia Ball (D)
- Rob Bryan (R-District 88), defeated by Mary Belk (D)

=== Open seats that changed parties ===
- Paul Tine (I-District 6) didn't seek re-election, seat won by Beverly Boswell (R)
- Ken Waddell (D-District 46) didn't seek re-election, seat won by Brenden Jones (R)
- Justin Moore (R-District 92) didn't seek re-election, seat won by Chaz Beasley (D)

== Predictions ==
Source	Ranking	As of
Governing	Lean R	October 12, 2016

== Detailed results ==
=== Districts 1-19 ===
==== District 1 ====
Incumbent Republican Bob Steinburg has represented the 1st District since 2013.

North Carolina House of Representatives 1st district general election, 2016
Party	Candidate	Votes	%
Republican	Bob Steinburg (incumbent)	25,363	64.04%
Democratic	Sam Davis	14,240	35.96%
Total votes		39,603	100%
Republican hold			

==== District 2 ====
Incumbent Republican Larry Yarborough has represented the 2nd district since 2015.

North Carolina House of Representatives 2nd district general election, 2016
Party	Candidate	Votes	%
Republican	Larry Yarborough (incumbent)	22,760	60.64%
Democratic	Joe Parrish	14,775	39.36%
Total votes		37,535	100%
Republican hold			

==== District 3 ====
Incumbent Republican Michael Speciale has represented the 3rd district since 2013.

North Carolina House of Representatives 3rd district general election, 2016
Party	Candidate	Votes	%
Republican	Michael Speciale (incumbent)	23,273	64.81%
Democratic	Marva Fisher Baldwin	12,638	35.19%
Total votes		35,911	100%
Republican hold			

==== District 4 ====
Incumbent Republican Jimmy Dixon has represented the 4th district since 2011.

North Carolina House of Representatives 4th district general election, 2016
Party	Candidate	Votes	%
Republican	Jimmy Dixon (incumbent)	24,646	100%
Total votes		24,646	100%
Republican hold			

==== District 5 ====
Incumbent Democrat Howard Hunter III has represented the 5th district since 2015.

North Carolina House of Representatives 5th district general election, 2016
Party	Candidate	Votes	%
Democratic	Howard Hunter III (incumbent)	25,961	100%
Total votes		25,961	100%
Democratic hold			

==== District 6 ====
Incumbent independent politician Paul Tine has represented the 6th district since 2013. Tine didn't seek re-election. Republican Beverly Boswell won the open seat.

North Carolina House of Representatives 6th district general election, 2016
Party	Candidate	Votes	%
Republican	Beverly Boswell	22,022	51.83%
Democratic	Warren Judge	20,471	48.17%
Total votes		42,493	100%
Republican gain from Independent			

==== District 7 ====
Incumbent Democrat Bobbie Richardson has represented the 7th district since 2013.

North Carolina House of Representatives 7th district general election, 2016
Party	Candidate	Votes	%
Democratic	Bobbie Richardson (incumbent)	23,329	67.81%
Republican	William Duke Hancock II	11,072	32.19%
Total votes		34,401	100%
Democratic hold			

==== District 8 ====
Incumbent Republican Susan Martin has represented the 8th district since 2013.

North Carolina House of Representatives 8th district general election, 2016
Party	Candidate	Votes	%
Republican	Susan Martin (incumbent)	21,329	50.19%
Democratic	Charlie Pat Farris	21,166	49.81%
Total votes		42,495	100%
Republican hold			

==== District 9 ====
Incumbent Republican Greg Murphy has represented the 9th district since 2015.

North Carolina House of representatives 9th district general election, 2016
Party	Candidate	Votes	%
Republican	Greg Murphy (incumbent)	22,869	57.35%
Democratic	Brian Farkas	17,007	42.65%
Total votes		39,876	100%
Republican hold			

==== District 10 ====
Incumbent Republican Majority Leader John Bell has represented the 10th district since 2013.

North Carolina House of Representatives 10th district general election, 2016
Party	Candidate	Votes	%
Republican	John Bell (incumbent)	26,440	71.55%
Democratic	Evelyn Paul	10,514	28.45%
Total votes		36,954	100%
Republican hold			

==== District 11 ====
Incumbent Democrat Duane Hall has represented the 11th district since 2013.

North Carolina House of Representatives 11th district general election, 2016
Party	Candidate	Votes	%
Democratic	Duane Hall (incumbent)	24,624	60.88%
Republican	Ray Martin	12,924	31.95%
Libertarian	Brian Lewis	2,897	7.16%
Total votes		40,445	100%
Democratic hold			

==== District 12 ====
Incumbent Democrat George Graham has represented the 12th district since 2013.

North Carolina House of Representatives 12th district general election, 2016
Party	Candidate	Votes	%
Democratic	George Graham (incumbent)	23,689	100%
Total votes		23,689	100%
Democratic hold			

==== District 13 ====
Incumbent Republican Pat McElraft has represented the 13th district since 2007.

North Carolina House of Representatives 13th district general election, 2016
Party	Candidate	Votes	%
Republican	Pat McElraft (incumbent)	29,188	70.82%
Democratic	Rodney Alexander	12,024	29.18%
Total votes		41,212	100%
Republican hold			

==== District 14 ====
Incumbent Republican George Cleveland has represented the 14th district since 2005.

North Carolina House of Representatives 14th district general election, 2016
Party	Candidate	Votes	%
Republican	George Cleveland (incumbent)	18,908	100%
Total votes		18,908	100%
Republican hold			

==== District 15 ====
Incumbent Republican Phil Shepard has represented the 15th district since 2011.

North Carolina House of Representatives 15th district general election, 2016
Party	Candidate	Votes	%
Republican	Phil Shepard (incumbent)	13,273	69.60%
Democratic	Dan Whitten	5,797	30.40%
Total votes		19,070	100%
Republican hold			

==== District 16 ====
Incumbent Republican Chris Millis has represented the 16th district since 2013.

North Carolina House of Representatives 16th district general election, 2016
Party	Candidate	Votes	%
Republican	Chris Millis (incumbent)	23,649	66.98%
Democratic	Steve Unger	11,656	33.02%
Total votes		35,305	100%
Republican hold			

==== District 17 ====
Incumbent Republican Frank Iler has represented the 17th district since 2009.

North Carolina House of representatives 17th district general election, 2016
Party	Candidate	Votes	%
Republican	Frank Iler (incumbent)	32,757	66.44%
Democratic	Charles Warren	16,549	33.56%
Total votes		49,306	100%
Republican hold			

==== District 18 ====
Incumbent Democrat Susi Hamilton has represented the 18th district since 2011.

North Carolina House of Representatives 18th district general election, 2016
Party	Candidate	Votes	%
Democratic	Susi Hamilton (incumbent)	22,006	61.10%
Republican	Gerald (Jerry) Benton	14,011	38.90%
Total votes		36,017	100%
Democratic hold			

==== District 19 ====
Incumbent Republican Ted Davis Jr. has represented the 19th district since 2012.

North Carolina House of Representatives 19th district general election, 2016
Party	Candidate	Votes	%
Republican	Ted Davis Jr. (incumbent)	31,133	100%
Total votes		31,133	100%
Republican hold			

=== Districts 20-39 ===
==== District 20 ====
Incumbent Republican Holly Grange has represented the 20th district since 2016. Grange was elected to her first full term.

North Carolina House of representavives 20th district general election, 2016
Party	Candidate	Votes	%
Republican	Holly Grange (incumbent)	32,576	100%
Total votes		32,576	100%
Republican hold			

==== District 21 ====
Incumbent Democrat Larry Bell has represented the 21st district and its predecessors since 2001.

North Carolina House of Representatives 21st district general election, 2016
Party	Candidate	Votes	%
Democratic	Larry Bell (incumbent)	24,564	100%
Total votes		24,564	100%
Democratic hold			

==== District 22 ====
Incumbent Democrat William Brisson has represented the 22nd district since 2007.

North Carolina House of Representatives 22nd district general election, 2016
Party	Candidate	Votes	%
Democratic	William Brisson (incumbent)	21,091	100%
Total votes		21,091	100%
Democratic hold			

==== District 23 ====
Incumbent Democrat Shelly Willingham has represented the 23rd district since 2015.

North Carolina House of Representatives 23rd district general election, 2016
Party	Candidate	Votes	%
Democratic	Shelly Willingham (incumbent)	27,208	100%
Total votes		27,208	100%
Democratic hold			

==== District 24 ====
Incumbent Democrat Jean Farmer-Butterfield has represented the 24th district since 2003.

North Carolina House of Repre sentativesdistrict general election, 2016
Party	Candidate	Votes	%
Democratic	Jean Farmer-Butterfield (incumbent)	26,895	100%
Total votes		26,895	100%
Democratic hold			

==== District 25 ====
Incumbent Republican Jeff Collins has represented the 25th district since 2011. His opponent James Gailliard sought election to this seat again in 2018 and became Collin's successor when he left office.

North CarolinaHouse of Representatives 25th district general election, 2016
Party	Candidate	Votes	%
Republican	Jeff Collins (incumbent)	27,969	68.10%
Democratic	James Gailliard	13,099	31.90%
Total votes		41,068	100%
Republican hold			

==== District 26 ====
Incumbent Republican Leo Daughtry has represented the 26th district and its predecessors since 1993. Daughtry didn't seek re-election and Donna McDowell White won the open seat.

North Carolina House of Representatives 26th district general election, 2016
Party	Candidate	Votes	%
Republican	Donna McDowell White	25,899	58.05%
Democratic	Rich Nixon	18,716	41.95%
Total votes		44,615	100%
Republican hold			

==== District 27 ====
Incumbent Democrat Michael Wray has represented the 27th district since 2005.

North Carolina House of Representatives 27th district general election, 2016
Party	Candidate	Votes	%
Democratic	Michael Wray (incumbent)	29,200	100%
Total votes		29,200	100%
Democratic hold			

==== District 28 ====
Incumbent Republican James Langdon Jr. has represented the 28th district since 2005. Republican Larry C. Strickland won the open seat.

North Carolina House of Representatives district general election, 2016
Party	Candidate	Votes	%
Republican	Larry Strickland	26,161	70.59%
Democratic	Patricia Oliver	10,897	29.41%
Total votes		37,058	100%
Republican hold			

==== District 29 ====
Incumbent Democratic Minority Leader Larry Hall has represented the 29th district since 2006.

North Carolina House of Representatives 29th district general election, 2016
Party	Candidate	Votes	%
Democratic	Larry Hall (incumbent)	39,607	100%
Total votes		39,607	100%
Democratic hold			

==== District 30 ====
Incumbent Democrat Paul Luebke has represented the 30th district since 1991. Luebke died before the election, but was re-elected posthumously. Philip Lehman was appointed to succeed Luebke at the start of 2017-2018 session.

North Carolina House of Representatives 30th district general election, 2016
Party	Candidate	Votes	%
Democratic	Paul Luebke (incumbent)	37,094	73.85%
Republican	Elissa Fuchs	13,132	26.15%
Total votes		50,226	100%
Democratic hold			

==== District 31 ====
Incumbent Democrat Mickey Michaux has represented the 31st district and its predecessors since 1983.

North Carolina House of Representatives 31st district general election, 2016
Party	Candidate	Votes	%
Democratic	Mickey Michaux (incumbent)	34,540	100%
Total votes		34,540	100%
Democratic hold			

==== District 32 ====
Incumbent Democrat Nathan Baskerville has represented the 32nd district since 2013. Baskerville didn't seek re-election and Democrat Terry Garrison won the open seat.

North Carolina House of Representatives district general election, 2016
Party	Candidate	Votes	%
Democratic	Terry Garrison	29,142	100%
Total votes		29,142	100%
Democratic hold			

==== District 33 ====
Incumbent Democrat Rosa Gill has represented the 33rd district since 2009.

North Carolina House of Representatives 33rd district general election, 2016
Party	Candidate	Votes	%
Democratic	Rosa Gill (incumbent)	33,094	100%
Total votes		33,094	100%
Democratic hold			

==== District 34 ====
Incumbent Democrat Grier Martin has represented the 34th district since 2013.

North Carolina House of Representatives 34th district general election, 2016
Party	Candidate	Votes	%
Democratic	Grier Martin (incumbent)	31,335	67.56%
Republican	Bill Morris	15,049	32.44%
Total votes		46,384	100%
Democratic hold			

==== District 35 ====
Incumbent Democrat Chris Malone has represented the 35th district since 2013.

North Carolina House of Representatives 35th district general election, 2016
Party	Candidate	Votes	%
Republican	Chris Malone (incumbent)	25,117	53.14%
Democratic	Terence Everitt	22,145	46.86%
Total votes		47,262	100%
Republican hold			

==== District 36 ====
Incumbent Republican Nelson Dollar has represented the 36th district since 2005.

North Carolina House of Representatives 36th district general election, 2016
Party	Candidate	Votes	%
Republican	Nelson Dollar (incumbent)	25,295	49.26%
Democratic	Jennifer Ferrell	23,875	46.49%
Libertarian	Brian Irving	2,184	4.25%
Total votes		51,354	100%
Republican hold			

==== District 37 ====
Incumbent Republican Paul Stam has represented the 37th district since 2003. Stam didn't seek re-election. Republican Linda Hunt Williams won the open seat.

North Carolina House of Representatives 37th district general election, 2016
Party	Candidate	Votes	%
Republican	Linda Hunt Williams	27,448	52.29%
Democratic	Randy Barrow	22,569	43.00%
Libertarian	Robert Rose	2,474	4.71%
Total votes		52,491	100%
Republican hold			

==== District 38 ====
Incumbent Democrat Yvonne Lewis Holley has represented the 38th district since 2013.

North Carolina House of Representatives 38th district general election, 2016
Party	Candidate	Votes	%
Democratic	Yvonne Lewis Holley (incumbent)	28,990	84.80%
Libertarian	Olen Watson III	5,196	15.20%
Total votes		34,186	100%
Democratic hold			

==== District 39 ====
Incumbent Democrat Darren Jackson has represented the 39th district since 2009.

North Carolina House of Representatives 39th district general election, 2016
Party	Candidate	Votes	%
Democratic	Darren Jackson (incumbent)	31,901	100%
Total votes		31,901	100%
Democratic hold			

=== Districts 40-59 ===
==== District 40 ====
Incumbent Republican Marilyn Avila has represented the 40th district since 2007. She lost re-election to Democrat Joe John.

North Carolina House of Representatives 40th district general election, 2016
Party	Candidate	Votes	%
Democratic	Joe John	23,786	50.41%
Republican	Marilyn Avila (incumbent)	23,402	49.59%
Total votes		47,188	100%
Democratic gain from Republican			

==== District 41 ====
Incumbent Democrat Gale Adcock has represented the 41st district since 2015.

North Carolina House of Representatives 41st district general election, 2016
Party	Candidate	Votes	%
Democratic	Gale Adcock (incumbent)	27,491	56.99%
Republican	Chris M. Shoffner	20,745	43.01%
Total votes		48,236	100%
Democratic hold			

==== District 42 ====
Incumbent Democrat Marvin Lucas has represented the 42nd district since 2001.

North Carolina House of Representatives 42nd district general election, 2016
Party	Candidate	Votes	%
Democratic	Marvin Lucas (incumbent)	24,213	100%
Total votes		24,213	100%
Democratic hold			

==== District 43 ====
Incumbent Democrat Elmer Floyd has represented the 43rd district since 2009.

North Carolina House of Representatives 43rd district general election, 2016
Party	Candidate	Votes	%
Democratic	Elmer Floyd (incumbent)	27,121	100%
Total votes		27,121	100%
Democratic hold			

==== District 44 ====
Incumbent Democrat Billy Richardson has represented the 44th district since 2015.

North Carolina House of Representatives 44th district general election, 2016
Party	Candidate	Votes	%
Democratic	Billy Richardson (incumbent)	15,433	50.57%
Republican	Jim Arp	15,086	49.43%
Total votes		30,519	100%
Democratic hold			

==== District 45 ====
Incumbent Republican John Szoka has represented the 45th district since 2013.

North Carolina House of Representatives 45th district general election, 2016
Party	Candidate	Votes	%
Republican	John Szoka (incumbent)	23,495	100%
Total votes		23,495	100%
Republican hold			

==== District 46 ====
Incumbent Democrat Ken Waddell has represented the 46th district since 2013. Waddell didn't seek re-election and was succeeded by Republican Brenden Jones.

North Carolina House of Representatives 46th district general election, 2016
Party	Candidate	Votes	%
Republican	Brenden Jones	19,607	60.34%
Democratic	Tim Benton	11,836	36.42%
Libertarian	Thomas Howell Jr.	1,052	3.24%
Total votes		32,495	100%
Republican gain from Democratic			

==== District 47 ====
Incumbent Democrat Charles Graham has represented the 47th district since 2011.

North Carolina House of Representatives 47th district general election, 2016
Party	Candidate	Votes	%
Democratic	Charles Graham (incumbent)	17,366	100%
Total votes		17,366	100%
Democratic hold			

==== District 48 ====
Incumbent Democrat Garland Pierce has represented the 48th district since 2005.

North Carolina House of Representatives 48th district general election, 2016
Party	Candidate	Votes	%
Democratic	Garland Pierce (incumbent)	24,076	100%
Total votes		24,076	100%
Democratic hold			

==== District 49 ====
Incumbent Republican Gary Pendleton has represented the 49th district since 2014. He was defeated for re-election by Democrat Cynthia Ball.

North Carolina House of Representatives 49th district general election, 2016
Party	Candidate	Votes	%
Democratic	Cynthia Ball	26,975	48.67%
Republican	Gary Pendleton (incumbent)	26,155	47.19%
Libertarian	David Ulmer	2,299	4.15%
Total votes		55,429	100%
Democratic gain from Republican			

==== District 50 ====
Incumbent Democrat Graig Meyer has represented the 50th district since 2013.

North Carolina House of Represesntatives 50th district general election, 2016
Party	Candidate	Votes	%
Democratic	Graig Meyer (incumbent)	27,278	57.28%
Republican	Rod Chaney	20,347	42.72%
Total votes		47,625	100%
Democratic hold			

==== District 51 ====
Incumbent Democrat Brad Salmon has represented the 51st district since 2015. Salmon lost re-election to Republican John Sauls

North Carolina House of Representatives 51st district general election, 2016
Party	Candidate	Votes	%
Republican	John Sauls	17,904	55.66%
Democratic	Brad Salmon (incumbent)	14,262	44.34%
Total votes		32,166	100%
Republican gain from Democratic			

==== District 52 ====
Incumbent Republican Jamie Boles has represented the 52nd district since 2009.

North Carolina House of Representatives 52nd district general election, 2016
Party	Candidate	Votes	%
Republican	Jamie Boles (incumbent)	31,146	100%
Total votes		31,146	100%
Republican hold			

==== District 53 ====
Incumbent Republican David Lewis has represented the 53rd district since 2003.

North Carolina House of Representatives 53rd district general election, 2016
Party	Candidate	Votes	%
Republican	David Lewis (incumbent)	19,548	60.66%
Democratic	Jon Blum	12,678	39.34%
Total votes		32,226	100%
Republican hold			

==== District 54 ====
Incumbent Democrat Robert Reives has represented the 54th district since 2014.

North Carolina House of Representatives 54th district general election, 2016
Party	Candidate	Votes	%
Democratic	Robert Reives (incumbent)	24,773	57.20%
Republican	Wesley Seawell	18,534	42.80%
Total votes		43,307	100%
Democratic hold			

==== District 55 ====
Incumbent Republican Mark Brody has represented the 55th district since 2013.

North Carolina House of Representatives 55th district general election, 2016
Party	Candidate	Votes	%
Republican	Mark Brody (incumbent)	20,901	60.37%
Democratic	Kim Hargett	13,719	39.63%
Total votes		34,620	100%
Republican hold			

==== District 56 ====
Incumbent Democrat Verla Insko has represented the 56th district since 1997.

North Carolina House of Representatives 56th district general election, 2016
Party	Candidate	Votes	%
Democratic	Verla Insko (incumbent)	43,144	100%
Total votes		43,144	100%
Democratic hold			

==== District 57 ====
Incumbent Democrat Pricey Harrison has represented the 57th district since 2005.

North Carolina House of Representatives 57th district general election, 2016
Party	Candidate	Votes	%
Democratic	Pricey Harrison (incumbent)	31,518	100%
Total votes		31,518	100%
Democratic hold			

==== District 58 ====
Incumbent Democrat Chris Sgro has represented the 58th district since his appointment in 2016. Sgro didn't seek re-election and fellow Democrat Amos Quick won the open seat.

North Carolina House of Representatives 58th district general election, 2016
Party	Candidate	Votes	%
Democratic	Amos Quick	35,176	100%
Total votes		35,176	100%
Democratic hold			

==== District 59 ====
Incumbent Republican Jon Hardister has represented the 59th district since 2013.

North Carolina House of Representatives 58th district general election, 2016
Party	Candidate	Votes	%
Republican	Jon Hardister (incumbent)	28,980	60.32%
Democratic	Scott A. Jones	19,060	39.68%
Total votes		48,040	100%
Republican hold			

=== Districts 60-79 ===
==== District 60 ====
Incumbent Democrat Cecil Brockman has represented the 60th district since 2015.

North Carolina House of Representatives 58th district general election, 2016
Party	Candidate	Votes	%
Democratic	Cecil Brockman (incumbent)	27,035	100%
Total votes		27,035	100%
Democratic hold			

==== District 61 ====
Incumbent Republican John Faircloth has represented the 61st District since 2011.

North Carolina House of Representatives 61st district general election, 2016
Party	Candidate	Votes	%
Republican	John Faircloth (incumbent)	31,767	100%
Total votes		31,767	100%
Republican hold			

==== District 62 ====
Incumbent Republican John Blust has represented the 62nd District since 2001.

North Carolina House of Representatives 62nd district general election, 2016
Party	Candidate	Votes	%
Republican	John Blust (incumbent)	32,010	100%
Total votes		32,010	100%
Republican hold			

==== District 63 ====
Incumbent Republican Stephen Ross has represented the 63rd District since 2013.

North Carolina House of Representatives 63rd district general election, 2016
Party	Candidate	Votes	%
Republican	Stephen Ross (incumbent)	26,068	100%
Total votes		26,068	100%
Republican hold			

==== District 64 ====
Incumbent Republican Dennis Riddell has represented the 64th District since 2013.

North Carolina House of Representatives 64th district general election, 2016
Party	Candidate	Votes	%
Republican	Dennis Riddell (incumbent)	23,857	100%
Total votes		23,857	100%
Republican hold			

==== District 65 ====
Incumbent Republican Bert Jones has represented the 65th District since 2011.

North Carolina House of Representatives 65th district general election, 2016
Party	Candidate	Votes	%
Republican	Bert Jones (incumbent)	21,857	60.39%
Democratic	H. Keith Duncan	14,336	39.61%
Total votes		36,193	100%
Republican hold			

==== District 66 ====
Incumbent Democrat Ken Goodman has represented the 66th District since 2011.

North Carolina House of Representatives 66th district general election, 2016
Party	Candidate	Votes	%
Democratic	Ken Goodman (incumbent)	23,396	100%
Total votes		23,396	100%
Democratic hold			

==== District 67 ====
Incumbent Republican Justin Burr has represented the 67th District since 2009.

North Carolina House of Representatives 67th district general election, 2016
Party	Candidate	Votes	%
Republican	Justin Burr (incumbent)	20,421	53.25%
Democratic	Carson Roger Snyder	10,637	27.74%
Unaffiliated	Billy Mills	7,288	19.01%
Total votes		38,346	100%
Republican hold			

==== District 68 ====
Incumbent Republican Craig Horn has represented the 68th District since 2011.

North Carolina House of Representatives 68th district general election, 2016
Party	Candidate	Votes	%
Republican	Craig Horn (incumbent)	30,953	100%
Total votes		30,953	100%
Republican hold			

==== District 69 ====
Incumbent Republican Dean Arp has represented the 69th District since 2013.

North Carolina House of Representatives 69th district general election, 2016
Party	Candidate	Votes	%
Republican	Dean Arp (incumbent)	23,249	66.01%
Democratic	Gordon B. Daniels	11,970	33.99%
Total votes		35,219	100%
Republican hold			

==== District 70 ====
Incumbent Republican Pat Hurley has represented the 70th District since 2007.

North Carolina House of Representatives 70th district general election, 2016
Party	Candidate	Votes	%
Republican	Pat Hurley (incumbent)	24,856	76.14%
Democratic	Lois Bohnsack	7,789	23.86%
Total votes		32,645	100%
Republican hold			

==== District 71 ====
Incumbent Democrat Evelyn Terry has represented the 71st District since 2013.

North Carolina House of Representatives 71st district general election, 2016
Party	Candidate	Votes	%
Democratic	Evelyn Terry (incumbent)	25,414	100%
Total votes		25,414	100%
Democratic hold			

==== District 72 ====
Incumbent Democrat Ed Hanes has represented the 72nd District since 2013.

North Carolina House of Representatives 72nd district general election, 2016
Party	Candidate	Votes	%
Democratic	Ed Hanes (incumbent)	28,192	100%
Total votes		28,192	100%
Democratic hold			

==== District 73 ====
Incumbent Republican Lee Zachary has represented the 73rd District since 2015.

North Carolina House of Representatives 73rd district general election, 2016
Party	Candidate	Votes	%
Republican	Lee Zachary (incumbent)	30,354	100%
Total votes		30,354	100%
Republican hold			

==== District 74 ====
Incumbent Republican Debra Conrad has represented the 74th District since 2013.

North Carolina House of Representatives 74th district general election, 2016
Party	Candidate	Votes	%
Republican	Debra Conrad (incumbent)	27,209	63.52%
Democratic	Marilynn Baker	15,626	36.48%
Total votes		42,835	100%
Republican hold			

==== District 75 ====
Incumbent Republican Donny Lambeth has represented the 75th District since 2013.

North Carolina House of Representatives 75th district general election, 2016
Party	Candidate	Votes	%
Republican	Donny Lambeth (incumbent)	30,831	100%
Total votes		30,831	100%
Republican hold			

==== District 76 ====
Incumbent Republican Carl Ford has represented the 76th District since 2013.

North Carolina House of Representatives 76th district general election, 2016
Party	Candidate	Votes	%
Republican	Carl Ford (incumbent)	29,590	100%
Total votes		29,590	100%
Republican hold			

==== District 77 ====
Incumbent Republican Harry Warren has represented the 77th District since 2011.

North Carolina House of Representatives th district general election, 2016
Party	Candidate	Votes	%
Republican	Harry Warren (incumbent)	27,699	100%
Total votes		27,699	100%
Republican hold			

==== District 78 ====
Incumbent Republican Allen McNeill has represented the 78th District since 2012.

North Carolina House of Representatives 78th district general election, 2016
Party	Candidate	Votes	%
Republican	Allen McNeill (incumbent)	27,040	78.11%
Democratic	William (Bill) McCaskill	7,579	21.89%
Total votes		34,619	100%
Republican hold			

==== District 79 ====
Incumbent Republican Julia Craven Howard has represented the 79th District and its predecessors since 1989.

North Carolina House of Representatives th district general election, 2016
Party	Candidate	Votes	%
Republican	Julia Craven Howard (incumbent)	31,255	100%
Total votes		31,255	100%
Republican hold			

=== Districts 80-99 ===
==== District 80 ====
Incumbent Republican Sam Watford has represented the 80th District since 2015.

North Carolina House of Representatives 80th district general election, 2016
Party	Candidate	Votes	%
Republican	Sam Watford (incumbent)	31,287	100%
Total votes		31,287	100%
Republican hold			

==== District 81 ====
Incumbent Republican Rayne Brown has represented the 81st District since 2011. Brown didn't seek re-election and Republican Larry Potts won the open seat.

North Carolina House of Representatives 81st district general election, 2016
Party	Candidate	Votes	%
Republican	Larry Potts	24,379	68.07%
Democratic	Andy Hedrick	11,438	31.93%
Total votes		35,817	100%
Republican hold			

==== District 82 ====
Incumbent Republican Larry Pittman has represented the 82nd District since 2011.

North Carolina House of Representatives 82nd district general election, 2016
Party	Candidate	Votes	%
Republican	Larry Pittman (incumbent)	24,636	57.92%
Democratic	Earle Schecter	17,900	42.08%
Total votes		42,536	100%
Republican hold			

==== District 83 ====
Incumbent Republican Linda Johnson has represented the 83rd District and its predecessors since 2001.

North Carolina House of Representatives 83rd district general election, 2016
Party	Candidate	Votes	%
Republican	Linda Johnson (incumbent)	22,927	63.10%
Democratic	Jeremy Hachen	13,407	36.90%
Total votes		36,334	100%
Republican hold			

==== District 84 ====
Incumbent Republican Rena Turner has represented the 84th District since 2013.

North Carolina House of Representatives 84th district general election, 2016
Party	Candidate	Votes	%
Republican	Rena Turner (incumbent)	25,414	69.29%
Democratic	John Wayne Kahl	11,266	30.71%
Total votes		36,680	100%
Republican hold			

==== District 85 ====
Incumbent Republican Josh Dobson has represented the 85th District since 2013.

North Carolina House of Representatives 85th district general election, 2016
Party	Candidate	Votes	%
Republican	Josh Dobson (incumbent)	29,064	100%
Total votes		29,064	100%
Republican hold			

==== District 86 ====
Incumbent Republican Hugh Blackwell has represented the 86th District since 2009.

North Carolina House of Representatives 86th district general election, 2016
Party	Candidate	Votes	%
Republican	Hugh Blackwell (incumbent)	21,226	62.44%
Democratic	Tim Barnsback	12,766	37.56%
Total votes		33,992	100%
Republican hold			

==== District 87 ====
Incumbent Republican George Robinson has represented the 87th District since 2015. Robinson ran for re-election but was defeated by Republican Destin Hall in the Republican primary. Hall easily won the general election.

North Carolina House of Representatives 87th district general election, 2016
Party	Candidate	Votes	%
Republican	Destin Hall	29,066	94.14%
Unaffaliated	Terri M. Johnson (write-in)	1,279	4.14%
Write-in		531	1.72%
Total votes		30,876	100%
Republican hold			

==== District 88 ====
Incumbent Republican Rob Bryan has represented the 88th District since 2013. Bryan lost re-election to Democrat Mary Belk.

North Carolina House of Representatives 88th district general election, 2016
Party	Candidate	Votes	%
Democratic	Mary Belk	21,754	50.54%
Republican	Rob Bryan (incumbent)	21,286	49.46%
Total votes		43,040	100%
Democratic gain from Republican			

==== District 89 ====
Incumbent Republican Mitchell Setzer has represented the 89th District and its predecessors since 1999.

North Carolina House of Representatives 89th district general election, 2016
Party	Candidate	Votes	%
Republican	Mitchell Setzer (incumbent)	28,409	100%
Total votes		28,409	100%
Republican hold			

==== District 90 ====
Incumbent Republican Sarah Stevens has represented the 90th District since 2009.

North Carolina House of Representatives 90th district general election, 2016
Party	Candidate	Votes	%
Republican	Sarah Stevens (incumbent)	23,678	73.26%
Democratic	Vera Smith Reynolds	8,641	26.74%
Total votes		32,319	100%
Republican hold			

==== District 91 ====
Incumbent Republican Kyle Hall has represented the 91st District since 2015.

North Carolina House of Representatives 91st district general election, 2016
Party	Candidate	Votes	%
Republican	Kyle Hall (incumbent)	24,639	66.47%
Democratic	Eugene Russell	12,430	33.53%
Total votes		37,069	100%
Republican hold			

==== District 92 ====
Incumbent Republican Justin Moore has represented the 92nd District since August 2016 after Charles Jeter resigned. Democrat Chaz Beasley defeated Republican Beth Danae Caulfield in the general election.

North Carolina House of Representatives 92nd district general election, 2016
Party	Candidate	Votes	%
Democratic	Chaz Beasley	22,941	54.38%
Republican	Beth Danae Caulfield	19,246	45.62%
Total votes		42,187	100%
Democratic gain from Republican			

==== District 93 ====
Incumbent Republican Jonathan Jordan has represented the 93rd District since 2011.

North Carolina House of Representatives 93rd district general election, 2016
Party	Candidate	Votes	%
Republican	Jonathan Jordan (incumbent)	21,910	53.00%
Democratic	Sue Counts	19,433	47.00%
Total votes		41,343	100%
Republican hold			

==== District 94 ====
Incumbent Republican Jeffrey Elmore has represented the 94th District since 2013.

North Carolina House of Representatives 94th district general election, 2016
Party	Candidate	Votes	%
Republican	Jeffrey Elmore (incumbent)	24,467	74.51%
Democratic	Michael T. Lentz	8,372	25.49%
Total votes		32,839	100%
Republican hold			

==== District 95 ====
Incumbent Republican John Fraley has represented the 95th District since 2015.

North Carolina House of Representatives 95th district general election, 2016
Party	Candidate	Votes	%
Republican	John Fraley (incumbent)	33,298	100%
Total votes		33,298	100%
Republican hold			

==== District 96 ====
Incumbent Republican Jay Adams has represented the 96th District since 2015.

North Carolina House of Representatives 96th district general election, 2016
Party	Candidate	Votes	%
Republican	Jay Adams (incumbent)	26,595	100%
Total votes		26,595	100%
Republican hold			

==== District 97 ====
Incumbent Republican Jason Saine has represented the 97th District since 2011.

North Carolina House of Representatives 97th district general election, 2016
Party	Candidate	Votes	%
Republican	Jason Saine (incumbent)	31,390	100%
Total votes		31,390	100%
Republican hold			

==== District 98 ====
Incumbent Republican John Bradford has represented the 98th District since 2015.

North Carolina House of Representatives 98th district general election, 2016
Party	Candidate	Votes	%
Republican	John Bradford (incumbent)	25,428	56.48%
Unaffaliated	Jane Campbell	19,597	43.52%
Total votes		45,025	100%
Republican hold			

==== District 99 ====
Incumbent DemocratRodney Moore has represented the 99th District since 2011.

North Carolina House of Representatives 99th district general election, 2016
Party	Candidate	Votes	%
Democratic	Rodney Moore (incumbent)	28,838	100%
Total votes		28,838	100%
Democratic hold			

=== Districts 100-120 ===
==== District 100 ====
Incumbent Democrat Tricia Cotham has represented the 100th District since 2007. Cotham didn't seek re-election and Democrat John Autry won the open seat.

North Carolina House of Representatives 100th district general election, 2016
Party	Candidate	Votes	%
Democratic	John Autry	25,736	100%
Total votes		25,736	100%
Democratic hold			

==== District 101 ====
Incumbent Democrat Beverly Earle has represented the 101st District and its predecessors since 1995.

North Carolina House of Representatives 101st district general election, 2016
Party	Candidate	Votes	%
Democratic	Beverly Earle (incumbent)	27,476	75.97%
Republican	Justin Dunn	8,691	24.03%
Total votes		36,167	100%
Democratic hold			

==== District 102 ====
Incumbent Democrat Becky Carney has represented the 102nd District since 2003.

North Carolina House of Representatives 102nd district general election, 2016
Party	Candidate	Votes	%
Democratic	Becky Carney (incumbent)	27,836	100%
Total votes		27,836	100%
Democratic hold			

==== District 103 ====
Incumbent Republican Bill Brawley has represented the 103rd District since 2011.

North Carolina House of Representatives 103rd district general election, 2016
Party	Candidate	Votes	%
Republican	Bill Brawley (incumbent)	21,702	56.19%
Democratic	Rochelle Rivas	16,922	43.81%
Total votes		38,624	100%
Republican hold			

==== District 104 ====
Incumbent Republican Dan Bishop has represented the 104th District since 2015. Bishop didn't seek re-election and successfully was elected to State Senate district 39. Republican Andy Dulin won the open seat.

North Carolina House of Representatives 104th district general election, 2016
Party	Candidate	Votes	%
Republican	Andy Dulin	24,700	55.32%
Democratic	Peter Noris	19,952	44.68%
Total votes		44,652	100%
Republican hold			

==== District 105 ====
Incumbent Republican Scott Stone has represented the 105th District since May 2016. Stone was elected to his first full term.

North Carolina House of Representatives 105th district general election, 2016
Party	Candidate	Votes	%
Republican	Scott Stone (incumbent)	21,853	55.27%
Democratic	Connie Green-Johnson	17,689	44.73%
Total votes		39,542	100%
Republican hold			

==== District 106 ====
Incumbent Democrat Carla Cunningham has represented the 106th District since 2013.

North Carolina House of Representatives 106th district general election, 2016
Party	Candidate	Votes	%
Democratic	Carla Cunningham (incumbent)	27,247	100%
Total votes		27,247	100%
Democratic hold			

==== District 107 ====
Incumbent Democrat Kelly Alexander has represented the 107th District since 2009.

North Carolina House of Representatives 107th district general election, 2016
Party	Candidate	Votes	%
Democratic	Kelly Alexander (incumbent)	34,305	100%
Total votes		34,305	100%
Democratic hold			

==== District 108 ====
Incumbent Republican John Torbett has represented the 108th District since 2011.

North Carolina House of Representatives 108th district general election, 2016
Party	Candidate	Votes	%
Republican	John Torbett (incumbent)	24,636	100%
Total votes		24,636	100%
Republican hold			

==== District 109 ====
Incumbent Republican Dana Bumgardner has represented the 109th District since 2013.

North Carolina House of Representatives 109th district general election, 2016
Party	Candidate	Votes	%
Republican	Dana Bumgardner (incumbent)	21,687	61.19%
Democratic	Susan Maxon	13,755	38.81%
Total votes			100%
Republican hold			

==== District 110 ====
Incumbent Republican Kelly Hastings has represented the 110th District since 2011.

North Carolina House of Representatives 110th district general election, 2016
Party	Candidate	Votes	%
Republican	Kelly Hastings (incumbent)	24,931	100%
Total votes		24,931	100%
Republican hold			

==== District 111 ====
Incumbent Republican Speaker of the House Tim Moore has represented the 111th District since 2003.

North Carolina House of Representatives 110th district general election, 2016
Party	Candidate	Votes	%
Republican	Tim Moore (incumbent)	25,398	100%
Total votes		25,398	100%
Republican hold			

==== District 112 ====
Incumbent Republican David Rogers has represented the 112th District since August 2016. Rogers was elected to his first full term.

North Carolina House of Representatives 112th district general election, 2016
Party	Candidate	Votes	%
Republican	David Rogers (incumbent)	22,938	70.96%
Unaffaliated	Ben Edwards	9,388	29.04%
Total votes		32,326	100%
Republican hold			

==== District 113 ====
Incumbent Republican Chris Whitmire has represented the 113th District since 2013. Whitmire didn't seek re-election. Republican Cody Henson won the open seat.

North Carolina House of Representatives 113th district general election, 2016
Party	Candidate	Votes	%
Republican	Cody Henson	26,848	61.61%
Democratic	Maureen Mahan Copelof	16,726	38.39%
Total votes		43,574	100%
Republican hold			

==== District 114 ====
Incumbent Democrat Susan Fisher has represented the 114th District since 2004.

North Carolina House of Representatives 114th district general election, 2016
Party	Candidate	Votes	%
Democratic	Susan Fisher (incumbent)	39,243	100%
Total votes		39,243	100%
Democratic hold			

==== District 115 ====
Incumbent Democrat John Ager has represented the 115th District since 2015.

North Carolina House of Representatives 115th district general election, 2016
Party	Candidate	Votes	%
Democratic	John Ager (incumbent)	25,257	55.58%
Republican	Frank Mortez	20,183	44.42%
Total votes		40,636	100%
Democratic hold			

==== District 116 ====
Incumbent Democrat Brian Turner has represented the 116th District since 2015.

North Carolina House of Representatives 116th district general election, 2016
Party	Candidate	Votes	%
Democratic	Brian Turner (incumbent)	28,014	100%
Total votes		28,014	100%
Democratic hold			

==== District 117 ====
Incumbent Republican Chuck McGrady has represented the 117th District since 2011.

North Carolina House of Representatives 117th district general election, 2016
Party	Candidate	Votes	%
Republican	Chuck McGrady (incumbent)	30,659	100%
Total votes		30,659	100%
Republican hold			

==== District 118 ====
Incumbent Republican Michele Presnell has represented the 118th District since 2013.

North Carolina House of Representatives 118th district general election, 2016
Party	Candidate	Votes	%
Republican	Michele Presnell (incumbent)	21,754	55.35%
Democratic	Rhonda Cole Schandevel	17,549	45.65%
Total votes		39,303	100%
Republican hold			

==== District 119 ====
Incumbent Democrat Joe Sam Queen has represented the 119th District since 2013. Queen was defeated for re-election by Republican Mike Clampitt.

North Carolina House of Representatives 119th district general election, 2016
Party	Candidate	Votes	%
Republican	Mike Clampitt	17,757	50.39%
Democratic	Joe Sam Queen (incumbent)	17,480	49.61%
Total votes		35,237	100%
Republican gain from Democratic			

==== District 120 ====
Incumbent Republican Roger West has represented the 120th District and its predecessors since 2000. West didn't seek re-election and Republican Kevin Corbin won the open seat.

North Carolina House of Representatives 120th district general election, 2016
Party	Candidate	Votes	%
Republican	Kevin Corbin	29,047	72.03%
Democratic	Randy Hogsed	11,282	27.97%
Total votes		40,329	100%
Republican hold			

== See also ==
- List of North Carolina state legislatures
