= North Carolina's 28th House district =

American legislative district

North Carolina's 28th State House of Representatives district
Representative
Larry Strickland; R–Pine Level, Johnston County
- Demographics: 59% White; 16% Black; 21% Hispanic; 1% Asian; 3% Multiracial
- Population (2024): 95,213

North Carolina's 28th House district is one of 120 districts in the North Carolina House of Representatives. It has been represented by Republican Larry Strickland since 2017.

== Geography ==
Since 2023, the district has included part of Johnston County. The district overlaps with the 10th Senate district.

== District officeholders ==
=== Single-member district ===
Representative	Party	Dates	Notes	Counties
District created January 1, 1967.
T. Clyde Auman (West End)	Democratic	January 1, 1967 – January 1, 1973	Redistricted from the Moore County district. Redistricted to the 25th district.	1967–1973; All of Moore County.

=== Multi-member district ===
Representative	Party	Dates	Notes	Representative	Party	Dates	Notes	Representative	Party	Dates	Notes	Counties
Clyde Green (Boone)	Republican	January 1, 1973 – January 1, 1975		William Hiatt (Mount Airy)	Republican	January 1, 1973 – January 1, 1975		Marshall Hall (King)	Republican	January 1, 1973 – January 1, 1975		1973–1983; All of Watauga, Ashe, Alleghany, Surry, and Stokes counties.
P. C. Collins Jr. (Laurel Springs)	Democratic	January 1, 1975 – January 1, 1981		David Diamont (Pilot Mountain)	Democratic	January 1, 1975 – January 1, 1983	Redistricted to the 40th district.	J. Worth Gentry (King)	Democratic	January 1, 1975 – January 1, 1981		1973–1983; All of Watauga, Ashe, Alleghany, Surry, and Stokes counties.
Margaret Hayden (Sparta)	Democratic	January 1, 1981 – January 1, 1983	Redistricted to the 40th district.	David Diamont (Pilot Mountain)	Democratic	January 1, 1975 – January 1, 1983	Redistricted to the 40th district.	William Hiatt (Mount Airy)	Republican	January 1, 1981 – January 1, 1983		1973–1983; All of Watauga, Ashe, Alleghany, Surry, and Stokes counties.
Dorothy Burnley (High Point)	Republican	January 1, 1983 – January 1, 1985	Redistricted from the 23rd district.	Mary Jarrell (High Point)	Democratic	January 1, 1983 – January 1, 1985						1983–1993; Part of Guilford County.
Richard Chalk Jr. (High Point)	Republican	January 1, 1985 – January 1, 1989	Retired to run for State Senate.	Stephen Wood (High Point)	Republican	January 1, 1985 – January 1, 1987						1983–1993; Part of Guilford County.
Richard Chalk Jr. (High Point)	Republican	January 1, 1985 – January 1, 1989	Retired to run for State Senate.	Mary Jarrell (High Point)	Democratic	January 1, 1987 – January 1, 1989						1983–1993; Part of Guilford County.
Steve Arnold (High Point)	Republican	January 1, 1989 – January 1, 1991		Stephen Wood (High Point)	Republican	January 1, 1989 – January 1, 1993	Redistricted to the 27th district.					1983–1993; Part of Guilford County.
Mary Jarrell (High Point)	Democratic	January 1, 1991 – January 1, 1993	Redistricted to the 89th district.	Stephen Wood (High Point)	Republican	January 1, 1989 – January 1, 1993	Redistricted to the 27th district.					1983–1993; Part of Guilford County.

=== Single-member district ===
Representative	Party	Dates	Notes	Counties
William Burton III (Greensboro)	Democratic	January 1, 1993 – January 1, 1995		1993–2003; Part of Guilford County.
Flossie Boyd-McIntyre (Jamestown)	Democratic	January 1, 1995 – January 1, 2003	Redistricted to the 62nd district and lost re-election.	1993–2003; Part of Guilford County.
Leo Daughtry (Smithfield)	Republican	January 1, 2003 – January 1, 2005	Redistricted from the 95th district. Redistricted to the 26th district.	2003–2005; Part of Johnston County.
James Langdon Jr. (Angier)	Republican	January 1, 2005 – January 1, 2017	Retired.	2005–2013; Parts of Johnston and Sampson counties.
James Langdon Jr. (Angier)	Republican	January 1, 2005 – January 1, 2017	Retired.	2013–2019; Part of Johnston County.
Larry Strickland (Pine Level)	Republican	January 1, 2017 – Present		2013–2019; Part of Johnston County.
Larry Strickland (Pine Level)	Republican	January 1, 2017 – Present		2019–2023; Parts of Johnston and Harnett counties.
Larry Strickland (Pine Level)	Republican	January 1, 2017 – Present		2023–Present; Part of Johnston County.

== Election results ==
=== 2026 ===
North Carolina House of Representatives 28th district Republican primary election, 2026
Party	Candidate	Votes	%
Republican	Larry Strickland (incumbent)	7,056	89.11%
Republican	Eric Bowles Sr.	862	10.89%
Total votes		7,918	100%

North Carolina House of Representatives 28th district general election, 2026
Party	Candidate	Votes	%
Republican	Larry Strickland (incumbent)		
Democratic	D. Matthew Bailey		
Total votes			100%

=== 2024 ===
North Carolina House of Representatives 28th district Republican primary election, 2024
Party	Candidate	Votes	%
Republican	Larry Strickland (incumbent)	8,877	89.31%
Republican	Elizabeth Anne Temple	1,062	10.69%
Total votes		9,939	100%

North Carolina House of Representatives 28th district general election, 2024
Party	Candidate	Votes	%
Republican	Larry Strickland (incumbent)	28,915	68.88%
Democratic	Tawanda Shepard	13,065	31.12%
Total votes		41,980	100%
Republican hold			

=== 2022 ===
North Carolina House of Representatives district Republican primary election, 2022
Party	Candidate	Votes	%
Republican	Larry Strickland (incumbent)	6,482	83.47%
Republican	Jim Davenport	1,284	16.53%
Total votes		7,766	100%

North Carolina House of Representatives 28th district general election, 2022
Party	Candidate	Votes	%
Republican	Larry Strickland (incumbent)	18,838	71.94%
Democratic	Wendy Ella May	7,349	28.06%
Total votes		26,187	100%
Republican hold			

=== 2020 ===
North Carolina House of Representatives district general election, 2020
Party	Candidate	Votes	%
Republican	Larry Strickland (incumbent)	29,510	67.70%
Democratic	Corey Stephens	14,082	32.30%
Total votes		43,592	100%
Republican hold			

=== 2018 ===
North Carolina House of Representatives 28th district general election, 2018
Party	Candidate	Votes	%
Republican	Larry Strickland (incumbent)	17,237	63.19%
Democratic	Jimmie M. Massengill	9,373	34.36%
Libertarian	Walt Rabon	670	2.46%
Total votes		27,280	100%
Republican hold			

=== 2016 ===
North Carolina House of Representatives district Democratic primary election, 2016
Party	Candidate	Votes	%
Democratic	Patricia Oliver	3,068	50.44%
Democratic	Jimmie M. Massengill	3,014	49.56%
Total votes		6,082	100%

North Carolina House of Representatives district Republican primary election, 2016
Party	Candidate	Votes	%
Republican	Larry Strickland	5,375	50.15%
Republican	Tony Braswell	4,478	41.78%
Republican	Gregory A. Dail	864	8.06%
Total votes		10,717	100%

North Carolina House of Representatives district general election, 2016
Party	Candidate	Votes	%
Republican	Larry Strickland	26,161	70.59%
Democratic	Patricia Oliver	10,897	29.41%
Total votes		37,058	100%
Republican hold			

=== 2014 ===
North Carolina House of Representatives district general election, 2014
Party	Candidate	Votes	%
Republican	James Langdon Jr. (incumbent)	17,487	100%
Total votes		17,487	100%
Republican hold			

=== 2012 ===
North Carolina House of Representatives district general election, 2012
Party	Candidate	Votes	%
Republican	James Langdon Jr. (incumbent)	25,169	100%
Total votes		25,169	100%
Republican hold			

=== 2010 ===
North Carolina House of Representatives district general election, 2010
Party	Candidate	Votes	%
Republican	James Langdon Jr. (incumbent)	19,918	76.72%
Democratic	Brian Allen	6,043	23.28%
Total votes		25,961	100%
Republican hold			

=== 2008 ===
North Carolina House of Representatives district general election, 2008
Party	Candidate	Votes	%
Republican	James Langdon Jr. (incumbent)	27,954	100%
Total votes		27,954	100%
Republican hold			

=== 2006 ===
North Carolina House of Representatives district general election, 2006
Party	Candidate	Votes	%
Republican	James Langdon Jr. (incumbent)	12,687	100%
Total votes		12,687	100%
Republican hold			

=== 2004 ===
North Carolina House of Representatives district general election, 2004
Party	Candidate	Votes	%
Republican	James Langdon Jr.	23,805	100%
Total votes		23,805	100%
Republican win (new seat)			

=== 2002 ===
North Carolina House of Representatives 28th district general election, 2002
Party	Candidate	Votes	%
Republican	Leo Daughtry (incumbent)	15,833	100%
Total votes		15,833	100%
Republican hold			

=== 2000 ===
North Carolina House of Representatives 28th district general election, 2000
Party	Candidate	Votes	%
Democratic	Flossie Boyd-McIntyre (incumbent)	15,313	100%
Total votes		15,313	100%
Democratic hold			
