= Pine Level, North Carolina =

Pine Level, North Carolina may refer to:

- Pine Level, Columbus County, North Carolina, Columbus County
- Pine Level, Johnston County, North Carolina
