= North Carolina's 32nd House district =

American legislative district

North Carolina's 32nd State House of Representatives district
Representative
Bryan Cohn; D–Oxford
- Demographics: 48% White; 37% Black; 10% Hispanic; 1% Asian; 1% Native American; 3% Multiracial
- Population (2024): 88,195

North Carolina's 32nd House district is one of 120 districts in the North Carolina House of Representatives. It has been represented by Democrat Bryan Cohn since 2025.

== Geography ==
Since 2025, the district has included all of Granville County, as well as part of Vance County. The district overlaps with the 11th and 18th Senate districts.

== District officeholders ==
Representative	Party	Dates	Notes	Counties
District created January 1, 1967.
Clyde Whitley (Albemarle)	Republican	January 1, 1967 – January 1, 1971	Redistricted from the Stanly County district.	1967–1983; All of Stanly County.
Richard Brown III (Albemarle)	Democratic	January 1, 1971 – January 1, 1977		1967–1983; All of Stanly County.
Janet Pickler (New London)	Democratic	January 1, 1977 – January 1, 1979		1967–1983; All of Stanly County.
H. Otha Carter (New London)	Republican	January 1, 1979 – January 1, 1981		1967–1983; All of Stanly County.
Pearson Almond (Albemarle)	Republican	January 1, 1981 – January 1, 1983	Redistricted to the 34th district.	1967–1983; All of Stanly County.
Hugh Lee (Rockingham)	Democratic	January 1, 1983 – January 1, 1985		1983–1993; All of Richmond County. Part of Scotland County.
Donald Dawkins (Rockingham)	Democratic	January 1, 1985 – January 1, 1993		1983–1993; All of Richmond County. Part of Scotland County.
Hugh Lee (Rockingham)	Democratic	January 1, 1993 – January 1, 1997	Retired.	1993–2003; All of Richmond County. Parts of Montgomery and Scotland counties.
Wayne Goodwin (Rockingham)	Democratic	January 1, 1997 – January 1, 2003	Redistricted to the 68th district.	1993–2003; All of Richmond County. Parts of Montgomery and Scotland counties.
Jim Crawford (Oxford)	Democratic	January 1, 2003 – January 1, 2013	Redistricted from the 22nd district. Redistricted to the 2nd district and lost re-nomination.	2003–2005; Part of Durham, Granville, and Vance counties.
Jim Crawford (Oxford)	Democratic	January 1, 2003 – January 1, 2013	Redistricted from the 22nd district. Redistricted to the 2nd district and lost re-nomination.	2005–2013; All of Granville County. Part of Vance County.
Nathan Baskerville (Henderson)	Democratic	January 1, 2013 – January 1, 2017	Retired.	2013–2023; All of Warren and Vance counties. Part of Granville County.
Terry Garrison (Henderson)	Democratic	January 1, 2017 – January 1, 2023	Lost re-election.	2013–2023; All of Warren and Vance counties. Part of Granville County.
Frank Sossamon (Henderson)	Republican	January 1, 2023 – January 1, 2025	Lost re-election.	2023–2025; All of Vance County. Part of Granville County.
Bryan Cohn (Oxford)	Democratic	January 1, 2025 – Present	Retiring.	2025–Present; All of Granville County. Part of Vance County.

== Election results ==
=== 2026 ===
North Carolina House of Representatives 32nd district Democratic primary election, 2026
Party	Candidate	Votes	%
Democratic	Curtis McRae	5,073	63.73%
Democratic	Melissa Elliott	2,887	36.27%
Total votes		7,960	100%

North Carolina House of Representatives 32nd district Republican primary election, 2026
Party	Candidate	Votes	%
Republican	Frank Sossamon	4,996	88.44%
Republican	Pamela Ayscue	653	11.56%
Total votes		5,649	100%

North Carolina House of Representatives 32nd district general election, 2026
Party	Candidate	Votes	%
Democratic	Curtis McRae		
Republican	Frank Sossamon		
Total votes			100%

=== 2024 ===
North Carolina House of Representatives 32nd district general election, 2024
Party	Candidate	Votes	%
Democratic	Bryan Cohn	21,215	48.95%
Republican	Frank Sossamon (incumbent)	20,987	48.42%
Libertarian	Ryan Brown	1,140	2.63%
Total votes		43,342	100%
Democratic gain from Republican			

=== 2022 ===
North Carolina House of Representatives district general election, 2022
Party	Candidate	Votes	%
Republican	Frank Sossamon	14,156	51.33%
Democratic	Terry Garrison (incumbent)	13,424	48.67%
Total votes		27,580	100%
Republican gain from Democratic			

=== 2020 ===
North Carolina House of Representatives district general election, 2020
Party	Candidate	Votes	%
Democratic	Terry Garrison (incumbent)	24,078	61.21%
Republican	David Woodson	15,260	38.79%
Total votes		39,338	100%
Democratic hold			

=== 2018 ===
North Carolina House of Representatives 32nd district general election, 2018
Party	Candidate	Votes	%
Democratic	Terry Garrison (incumbent)	17,822	64.27%
Republican	Robert Shingler	9,909	35.73%
Total votes		27,731	100%
Democratic hold			

=== 2016 ===
North Carolina House of Representatives 32nd district Democratic primary election, 2016
Party	Candidate	Votes	%
Democratic	Terry Garrison	9,190	67.38%
Democratic	Gary Lamont Miles Sr.	4,449	32.62%
Total votes		13,639	100%

North Carolina House of Representatives district general election, 2016
Party	Candidate	Votes	%
Democratic	Terry Garrison	29,142	100%
Total votes		29,142	100%
Democratic hold			

=== 2014 ===
North Carolina House of Representatives district general election, 2014
Party	Candidate	Votes	%
Democratic	Nathan Baskerville (incumbent)	19,931	100%
Total votes		19,931	100%
Democratic hold			

=== 2012 ===
North Carolina House of Representatives district Democratic primary election, 2012
Party	Candidate	Votes	%
Democratic	Nathan Baskerville	5,864	39.46%
Democratic	Jim Crawford	4,627	31.13%
Democratic	Dollie B. Burwell	4,371	29.41%
Total votes		14,862	100%

North Carolina House of Representatives district Democratic primary run-off election, 2012
Party	Candidate	Votes	%
Democratic	Nathan Baskerville	5,622	76.57%
Democratic	Jim Crawford	1,720	23.43%
Total votes		7,342	100%

North Carolina House of Representatives district general election, 2012
Party	Candidate	Votes	%
Democratic	Nathan Baskerville	27,057	70.78%
Republican	Scott Bynum	11,170	29.22%
Total votes		38,227	100%
Democratic win (new seat)			

=== 2010 ===
North Carolina House of Representatives district general election, 2010
Party	Candidate	Votes	%
Democratic	Jim Crawford (incumbent)	13,814	78.42%
Libertarian	Barbara Howe	3,802	21.58%
Total votes		17,616	100%
Democratic hold			

=== 2008 ===
North Carolina House of Representatives district general election, 2008
Party	Candidate	Votes	%
Democratic	Jim Crawford (incumbent)	23,934	87.81%
Libertarian	Barbara Howe	3,322	12.19%
Total votes		27,256	100%
Democratic hold			

=== 2006 ===
North Carolina House of Representatives district general election, 2006
Party	Candidate	Votes	%
Democratic	Jim Crawford (incumbent)	10,531	100%
Total votes		10,531	100%
Democratic hold			

=== 2004 ===
North Carolina House of Representatives 32nd district Democratic primary election, 2004
Party	Candidate	Votes	%
Democratic	Jim Crawford (incumbent)	4,281	55.93%
Democratic	James J. Gouch	3,373	44.07%
Total votes		7,654	100%

North Carolina House of Representatives district general election, 2004
Party	Candidate	Votes	%
Democratic	Jim Crawford (incumbent)	18,851	88.27%
Libertarian	Tom Howe	2,505	11.73%
Total votes		21,356	100%
Democratic hold			

=== 2002 ===
North Carolina House of Representatives 32nd district Democratic primary election, 2002
Party	Candidate	Votes	%
Democratic	Jim Crawford (incumbent)	4,083	75.03%
Democratic	Bernard A. Holliday	1,359	24.97%
Total votes		5,442	100%

North Carolina House of Representatives 32nd district general election, 2002
Party	Candidate	Votes	%
Democratic	Jim Crawford (incumbent)	10,644	58.24%
Republican	Sallie Edwards-Pickett	6,852	37.49%
Libertarian	Barbara Howe	780	4.27%
Total votes		18,276	100%
Democratic hold			

=== 2000 ===
North Carolina House of Representatives 32nd district general election, 2000
Party	Candidate	Votes	%
Democratic	Wayne Goodwin (incumbent)	13,417	100%
Total votes		13,417	100%
Democratic hold			
