= Frank Sossamon =

American politician

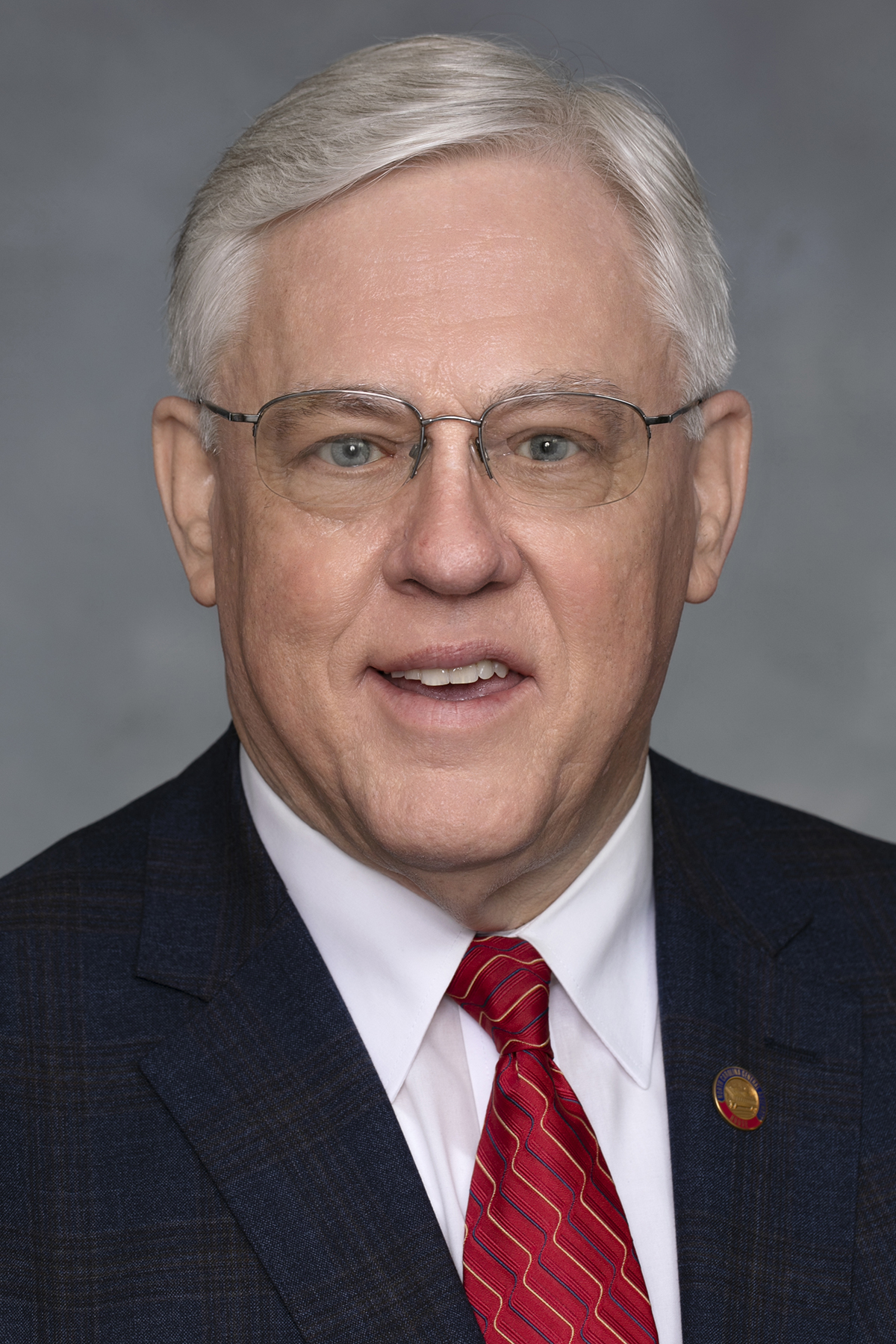

Member of the North Carolina House of Representatives from the 32nd district
- In office January 1, 2023 – January 1, 2025
- Preceded by: Terry Garrison
- Succeeded by: Bryan Cohn

Personal details
- Party: Republican
- Spouse: Vickie
- Children: 3
- Education: East Carolina University
- Occupation: Pastor and Funeral Home Owner
- Website: Official website

John Franklin Sossamon is an American politician. He is a Republican former member of the North Carolina House of Representatives, who represented the 32nd district (including all of Vance County, as well as most of Granville County.) from 2023 to 2025.

== Committee assignments ==
=== 2023-2024 session ===
- Appropriations
- Appropriations - Education
- Commerce
- Education: K-12
- Transportation

== Electoral history ==
=== 2024 ===
North Carolina House of Representatives 32nd district general election, 2024
Party	Candidate	Votes	%
Democratic	Bryan Cohn	21,215	48.95%
Republican	Frank Sossamon (incumbent)	20,987	48.42%
Libertarian	Ryan Brown	1,140	2.63%
Total votes		43,342	100%
Democratic gain from Republican			

=== 2022 ===
North Carolina House of Representatives district general election, 2022
Party	Candidate	Votes	%
Republican	Frank Sossamon	14,156	51.33%
Democratic	Terry Garrison (incumbent)	13,424	48.67%
Total votes		27,580	100%
Republican gain from Democratic			

North Carolina House of Representatives
Preceded by Terry Garrison	Member of the North Carolina House of Representatives from the 32nd district 2023–2025	Succeeded by Bryan Cohn
