= James W. Crawford Jr. =

American politician from North Carolina

James Crawford
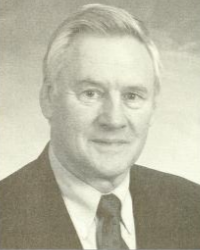
- Crawford in the 2003 legislative manual

Member of the North Carolina House of Representatives
- In office January 1, 1995 – January 1, 2013
- Preceded by: Richard Moore
- Succeeded by: Winkie Wilkins (Redistricting)
- Constituency: 22nd District (1995-2003); 32nd District (2003-2013)
- In office January 1, 1983 – January 1, 1993
- Preceded by: Thomas William Ellis Jr. (Redistricting)
- Succeeded by: Richard Moore
- Constituency: 22nd District

Personal details
- Born: James Walker Crawford Jr. October 4, 1937 (age 88)
- Party: Democratic
- Education: University of North Carolina, Chapel Hill (BS)
- Profession: retail developer

James Walker Crawford Jr. (born October 4, 1937) is a former member of the North Carolina General Assembly. A Democrat, he represented the state's thirty-second House district, including constituents in Granville and Vance counties. A retail developer from Oxford, North Carolina, Crawford served fourteen terms in the state House of Representatives. In his last term he served as one of the chairmen of the House Appropriations committee (and the only Democrat to be a chairman in the Republican-majority House).

Crawford earned a degree in Industrial Relations from the University of North Carolina at Chapel Hill. After serving in the United States Navy and as an Oxford city commissioner, Crawford was first elected to the legislature in 1982. He considered a run for Lieutenant Governor of North Carolina in 1988, but dropped out and was re-elected to the House. In 1992, he ran for Lt. Governor, losing in the Democratic primary to Dennis Wicker. Crawford's seat in the House was won by Richard H. Moore. When Moore ran for Congress in 1994, Crawford won the seat back. He was re-elected without opposition in 2006. In 2008 and in 2010, he was opposed by Libertarian Barbara Howe.

In 2012, after supporting the budget passed by the House Republican majority and after supporting the bill that put North Carolina Amendment 1 before the voters, Crawford was defeated in the May 8 Democratic primary by fellow Rep. Winkie Wilkins. The Republican majority had placed both Democratic lawmakers in the new 2nd District during redistricting. Crawford endorsed Republican Pat McCrory in the subsequent general election for Governor. McCrory later appointed Crawford to the state Board of Transportation.

== Notes ==
North Carolina House of Representatives
| Preceded by Bertha Merrill Holt; John M. Jordan; Timothy Hill McDowell; Robert Lee McAlister | Member of the North Carolina House of Representatives from the 22nd district 1983–1993 | Succeeded by Richard Moore |
| Preceded by Richard Moore | Member of the North Carolina House of Representatives from the 22nd district 1995–2003 | Succeeded by Edd Nye |
| Preceded by Wayne Goodwin | Member of the North Carolina House of Representatives from the 32nd district 2003–2013 | Succeeded by Nathan Baskerville |
