= Edd Nye =

American politician from North Carolina (1932–2025)

Member of the North Carolina House of Representatives
- In office January 1, 1985 – January 1, 2007
- Preceded by: Edward C. Bowen
- Succeeded by: William Brisson
- Constituency: 12th District (1985–1993); 96th District (1993–2003); 22nd District (2003–2007)
- In office January 1, 1977 – January 1, 1983
- Preceded by: James Collins Green; R. C. Soles Jr.
- Succeeded by: Edward C. Bowen; Murray Powell Poole (Redistricting)
- Constituency: 19th District

Member of the North Carolina Senate from the 11th district
- In office January 1, 1975 – January 1, 1977
- Preceded by: Arthur W. Williamson
- Succeeded by: R. C. Soles Jr.

Personal details
- Born: September 12, 1932 Gulf, North Carolina, U.S.
- Died: June 13, 2025 (aged 92)
- Party: Democratic
- Education: North Carolina State University
- Profession: Insurance Executive

Edd Nye (September 12, 1932 – June 13, 2025) was an American politician who was a Democratic member of the North Carolina General Assembly representing the US state's twenty-second House district, including constituents in Bladen and Sampson counties. An insurance professional from Elizabethtown, North Carolina, Nye was (2003–2004 session) serving in his thirteenth term in the state House, where he held the position of Permanent Democratic Caucus Chair. Nye was one of the chief budget writers in the North Carolina House. Nye previously served one term in the state Senate.

Nye was predeceased by his wife, Irene, in February 2024. They were married for 69 years. He died on June 13, 2025, at the age of 92.

== Electoral history ==
=== 2006 ===
North Carolina House of Representatives 22nd district Democratic primary election, 2006
Party	Candidate	Votes	%
Democratic	William Brisson	3,903	50.47%
Democratic	Edd Nye (incumbent)	3,831	49.53%
Total votes		7,734	100%

=== 2004 ===
North Carolina House of Representatives 22nd district Democratic primary election, 2004
Party	Candidate	Votes	%
Democratic	Edd Nye (incumbent)	3,453	53.38%
Democratic	William Brisson	3,016	46.62%
Total votes		6,469	100%

North Carolina House of Representatives 22nd district general election, 2004
Party	Candidate	Votes	%
Democratic	Edd Nye (incumbent)	18,646	100%
Total votes		18,646	100%
Democratic hold			

=== 2002 ===
2002 North Carolina House of Representatives 22nd district Democratic primary election, 2002
Party	Candidate	Votes	%
Democratic	Edd Nye (incumbent)	5,528	54.37%
Democratic	Nurham Warwick (incumbent)	4,640	45.63%
Total votes		10,168	100%

2002 North Carolina House of Representatives 22nd district general election, 2002
Party	Candidate	Votes	%
Democratic	Edd Nye (incumbent)	11,614	62.27%
Republican	Joy Barbour	7,038	37.73%
Total votes		18,652	100%
Democratic hold			

=== 2000 ===
North Carolina House of Representatives 96th district Democratic primary election, 2000
Party	Candidate	Votes	%
Democratic	Edd Nye (incumbent)	4,435	49.69%
Democratic	Ron Taylor	2,453	27.49%
Democratic	Donna Gooden Payne	2,037	22.82%
Total votes		8,925	100%

North Carolina House of Representatives 96th district general election, 2000
Party	Candidate	Votes	%
Democratic	Edd Nye (incumbent)	14,599	53.39%
Republican	Al Freimark	12,743	46.61%
Total votes		27,342	100%
Democratic hold			

North Carolina Senate
Preceded by Arthur W. Williamson	Member of the North Carolina Senate from the 11th district 1975–1977	Succeeded by R. C. Soles Jr.
North Carolina House of Representatives
Preceded by James Collins Green; R. C. Soles Jr.	Member of the North Carolina House of Representatives from the 19th district 1977–1983; Served alongside: George Ronald Taylor, Ottis Richard Wright Jr.	Succeeded by Bob Etheridge; Dennis Wicker
Preceded by Edward C. Bowen	Member of the North Carolina House of Representatives from the 12th district 1985–1993; Served alongside: Murray Powell Poole, Edward C. Bowen	Succeeded by Edward C. Bowen
Preceded by Constituency established	Member of the North Carolina House of Representatives from the 96th district 1993–2003	Succeeded by Frank Mitchell
Preceded by Jim Crawford; Gordon Allen	Member of the North Carolina House of Representatives from the 22nd district 2003–2007	Succeeded by William Brisson
