= North Carolina's 22nd House district =

American legislative district

North Carolina's 22nd State House of Representatives district
Representative
William Brisson; R–Dublin
- Demographics: 51% White; 27% Black; 18% Hispanic; 2% Native American; 2% Multiracial
- Population (2024): 89,036

North Carolina's 22nd House district is one of 120 districts in the North Carolina House of Representatives. It has been represented by Republican William Brisson since 2007.

== Geography ==
Since 2023, the district has included all of Bladen and Sampson counties. The district overlaps with the 9th and 12th Senate districts.

== District officeholders ==
=== Multi-member district ===
Representative	Party	Dates	Notes	Representative	Party	Dates	Notes	Representative	Party	Dates	Notes	Representative	Party	Dates	Notes	Counties
District created January 1, 1967.
William Staton (Sanford)	Democratic	January 1, 1967 – January 1, 1969	Retired to run for State Senate.	Jimmy Love (Sanford)	Democratic	January 1, 1967 – January 1, 1973	Redistricted to the 18th district.									1967–1973; All of Harnett and Lee counties.
James Penny Jr. (Lillington)	Democratic	January 1, 1969 – January 1, 1971		Jimmy Love (Sanford)	Democratic	January 1, 1967 – January 1, 1973	Redistricted to the 18th district.									1967–1973; All of Harnett and Lee counties.
S. Gerald Arnold (Lillington)	Democratic	January 1, 1971 – January 1, 1973	Redistricted to the 18th district.	Jimmy Love (Sanford)	Democratic	January 1, 1967 – January 1, 1973	Redistricted to the 18th district.									1967–1973; All of Harnett and Lee counties.
James Long (Burlington)	Democratic	January 1, 1973 – January 1, 1977	Redistricted from the 21st district.	W. S. "Sandy" Harris Jr. (Graham)	Democratic	January 1, 1973 – September 2, 1977	Redistricted from the 21st district. Resigned.	Homer Wright Jr. (Eden)	Democratic	January 1, 1973 – January 1, 1975		David Blackwell (Reidsville)	Democratic	January 1, 1973 – January 1, 1977		1973–1983; All of Alamance and Rockingham counties.
James Long (Burlington)	Democratic	January 1, 1973 – January 1, 1977	Redistricted from the 21st district.	W. S. "Sandy" Harris Jr. (Graham)	Democratic	January 1, 1973 – September 2, 1977	Redistricted from the 21st district. Resigned.	John Jordan (Saxapahaw)	Democratic	January 1, 1975 – January 1, 1977		David Blackwell (Reidsville)	Democratic	January 1, 1973 – January 1, 1977		1973–1983; All of Alamance and Rockingham counties.
Bertha Merrill Holt (Burlington)	Democratic	January 1, 1977 – January 1, 1983	Redistricted to the 25th district.	W. S. "Sandy" Harris Jr. (Graham)	Democratic	January 1, 1973 – September 2, 1977	Redistricted from the 21st district. Resigned.	Daniel Hall Jr. (Burlington)	Democratic	January 1, 1977 – January 1, 1979		Conrad Duncan (Stoneville)	Democratic	January 1, 1977 – October 6, 1977	Resigned to accept appointment to the State Senate.	1973–1983; All of Alamance and Rockingham counties.
Bertha Merrill Holt (Burlington)	Democratic	January 1, 1977 – January 1, 1983	Redistricted to the 25th district.	Vacant		September 2, 1977 – September 19, 1977		Daniel Hall Jr. (Burlington)	Democratic	January 1, 1977 – January 1, 1979		Conrad Duncan (Stoneville)	Democratic	January 1, 1977 – October 6, 1977	Resigned to accept appointment to the State Senate.	1973–1983; All of Alamance and Rockingham counties.
Bertha Merrill Holt (Burlington)	Democratic	January 1, 1977 – January 1, 1983	Redistricted to the 25th district.	Timothy McDowell (Mebane)	Democratic	September 19, 1977 – January 1, 1983	Appointed to finish Harris' term. Redistricted to the 25th district.	Daniel Hall Jr. (Burlington)	Democratic	January 1, 1977 – January 1, 1979		Conrad Duncan (Stoneville)	Democratic	January 1, 1977 – October 6, 1977	Resigned to accept appointment to the State Senate.	1973–1983; All of Alamance and Rockingham counties.
Bertha Merrill Holt (Burlington)	Democratic	January 1, 1977 – January 1, 1983	Redistricted to the 25th district.	Timothy McDowell (Mebane)	Democratic	September 19, 1977 – January 1, 1983	Appointed to finish Harris' term. Redistricted to the 25th district.	Daniel Hall Jr. (Burlington)	Democratic	January 1, 1977 – January 1, 1979		Vacant		October 6, 1977 – October 13, 1977		1973–1983; All of Alamance and Rockingham counties.
Bertha Merrill Holt (Burlington)	Democratic	January 1, 1977 – January 1, 1983	Redistricted to the 25th district.	Timothy McDowell (Mebane)	Democratic	September 19, 1977 – January 1, 1983	Appointed to finish Harris' term. Redistricted to the 25th district.	Daniel Hall Jr. (Burlington)	Democratic	January 1, 1977 – January 1, 1979		Robert McAlister (Ruffin)	Democratic	October 13, 1977 – January 1, 1983	Appointed to finish Duncan's term. Redistricted to the 25th district.	1973–1983; All of Alamance and Rockingham counties.
Bertha Merrill Holt (Burlington)	Democratic	January 1, 1977 – January 1, 1983	Redistricted to the 25th district.	Timothy McDowell (Mebane)	Democratic	September 19, 1977 – January 1, 1983	Appointed to finish Harris' term. Redistricted to the 25th district.	John Jordan (Saxapahaw)	Democratic	January 1, 1979 – January 1, 1983	Redistricted to the 25th district.	Robert McAlister (Ruffin)	Democratic	October 13, 1977 – January 1, 1983	Appointed to finish Duncan's term. Redistricted to the 25th district.	1973–1983; All of Alamance and Rockingham counties.
Jim Crawford (Oxford)	Democratic	January 1, 1983 – January 1, 1993	Retired to run for Lieutenant Governor.	William Watkins (Oxford)	Democratic	January 1, 1983 – January 1, 1991	Redistricted from the 13th district.	John Church (Henderson)	Democratic	January 1, 1983 – January 1, 1993	Redistricted from the 13th district.					1983–1993; All of Caswell, Person, Granville, and Vance counties. Parts of Warren and Halifax counties.
Jim Crawford (Oxford)	Democratic	January 1, 1983 – January 1, 1993	Retired to run for Lieutenant Governor.	James Green Sr. (Henderson)	Democratic	January 1, 1991 – January 1, 1993	Redistricted to the 78th district.	John Church (Henderson)	Democratic	January 1, 1983 – January 1, 1993	Redistricted from the 13th district.					1983–1993; All of Caswell, Person, Granville, and Vance counties. Parts of Warren and Halifax counties.
Richard Moore (Henderson)	Democratic	January 1, 1993 – January 1, 1995	Retired to run for Congress.	Michael Wilkins (Roxboro)	Democratic	January 1, 1993 – January 1, 1997										1993–2003; All of Person County. Parts of Granville, Vance, Franklin, and Warren counties.
Jim Crawford (Oxford)	Democratic	January 1, 1995 – January 1, 2003	Redistricted to the 32nd district.	Michael Wilkins (Roxboro)	Democratic	January 1, 1993 – January 1, 1997										1993–2003; All of Person County. Parts of Granville, Vance, Franklin, and Warren counties.
Jim Crawford (Oxford)	Democratic	January 1, 1995 – January 1, 2003	Redistricted to the 32nd district.	Gordon Allen (Roxboro)	Democratic	January 1, 1997 – January 1, 2003	Redistricted to the 55th district.									1993–2003; All of Person County. Parts of Granville, Vance, Franklin, and Warren counties.

=== Single-member district ===
Representative	Party	Dates	Notes	Counties
Edd Nye (Elizabethtown)	Democratic	January 1, 2003 – January 1, 2007	Redistricted from the 96th district. Lost re-nomination.	2003–2005; All of Bladen County. Part of Sampson County.
Edd Nye (Elizabethtown)	Democratic	January 1, 2003 – January 1, 2007	Redistricted from the 96th district. Lost re-nomination.	2005–2013; All of Bladen County. Part of Cumberland County.
William Brisson (Dublin)	Democratic	January 1, 2007 – October 25, 2017	Switched parties. Retiring.	2005–2013; All of Bladen County. Part of Cumberland County.
William Brisson (Dublin)	Democratic	January 1, 2007 – October 25, 2017	Switched parties. Retiring.	2013–2019; Parts of Bladen and Sampson counties.
William Brisson (Dublin)	Republican	October 25, 2017 – Present	Switched parties. Retiring.	2013–2019; Parts of Bladen and Sampson counties.
William Brisson (Dublin)	Republican	October 25, 2017 – Present	Switched parties. Retiring.	2019–2023; All of Bladen County. Part of Sampson County.
William Brisson (Dublin)	Republican	October 25, 2017 – Present	Switched parties. Retiring.	2023–Present; All of Bladen and Sampson counties.

== Election results ==
=== 2026 ===
North Carolina House of Representatives 22nd district Republican primary election, 2026
Party	Candidate	Votes	%
Republican	Wellie Jackson	7,155	77.23%
Republican	Jerol Kivett	2,109	22.77%
Total votes		9,264	100%

North Carolina House of Representatives 22nd district general election, 2026
Party	Candidate	Votes	%
Republican	Wellie Jackson		
Democratic	Jimmy Melvin		
Total votes			100%

=== 2024 ===
North Carolina House of Representatives 22nd district general election, 2024
Party	Candidate	Votes	%
Republican	William Brisson (incumbent)	26,176	61.01%
Democratic	Joshua Harrell	16,729	38.99%
Total votes		42,905	100%
Republican hold			

=== 2022 ===
North Carolina House of Representatives 22nd district general election, 2022
Party	Candidate	Votes	%
Republican	William Brisson (incumbent)	20,633	100%
Total votes		20,633	100%
Republican hold			

=== 2020 ===
North Carolina House of Representatives 22nd district Democratic primary election, 2020
Party	Candidate	Votes	%
Democratic	Albert D. Kirby Jr.	5,552	72.48%
Democratic	Martin "Tony" Denning	2,108	27.52%
Total votes		7,660	100%

North Carolina House of Representatives 22nd district general election, 2020
Party	Candidate	Votes	%
Republican	William Brisson (incumbent)	21,698	57.55%
Democratic	Albert D. Kirby Jr.	16,002	42.45%
Total votes		37,700	100%
Republican hold			

=== 2018 ===
North Carolina House of Representatives 22nd district Democratic primary election, 2018
Party	Candidate	Votes	%
Democratic	Martin "Tony" Denning	2,858	56.56%
Democratic	Lawrence A. Aycock	2,195	43.44%
Total votes		5,053	100%

North Carolina House of Representatives 22nd district general election, 2018
Party	Candidate	Votes	%
Republican	William Brisson (incumbent)	15,423	56.69%
Democratic	Martin "Tony" Denning	11,783	43.31%
Total votes		27,206	100%
Republican hold			

=== 2016 ===
North Carolina House of Representatives 22nd district Democratic primary election, 2016
Party	Candidate	Votes	%
Democratic	William Brisson (incumbent)	4,642	53.48%
Democratic	Ben Snyder	4,038	46.52%
Total votes		8,680	100%

North Carolina House of Representatives 22nd district general election, 2016
Party	Candidate	Votes	%
Democratic	William Brisson (incumbent)	21,091	100%
Total votes		21,091	100%
Democratic hold			

=== 2014 ===
North Carolina House of Representatives 22nd district general election, 2014
Party	Candidate	Votes	%
Democratic	William Brisson (incumbent)	12,208	51.99%
Republican	Ken Smith	11,274	48.01%
Total votes		23,482	100%
Democratic hold			

=== 2012 ===
North Carolina House of Representatives 22nd district Democratic primary election, 2012
Party	Candidate	Votes	%
Democratic	William Brisson (incumbent)	5,128	51.61%
Democratic	Matt Dixon	4,808	48.39%
Total votes		9,936	100%

North Carolina House of Representatives 22nd district general election, 2012
Party	Candidate	Votes	%
Democratic	William Brisson (incumbent)	21,187	100%
Total votes		21,187	100%
Democratic hold			

=== 2010 ===
North Carolina House of Representatives 22nd district Democratic primary election, 2010
Party	Candidate	Votes	%
Democratic	William Brisson (incumbent)	6,499	73.15%
Democratic	Robert Jacobs Brooks	2,385	26.85%
Total votes		8,884	100%

North Carolina House of Representatives 22nd district general election, 2010
Party	Candidate	Votes	%
Democratic	William Brisson (incumbent)	12,675	52.87%
Republican	John Szoka	11,298	47.13%
Total votes		23,973	100%
Democratic hold			

=== 2008 ===
North Carolina House of Representatives 22nd district Democratic primary election, 2008
Party	Candidate	Votes	%
Democratic	William Brisson (incumbent)	9,375	64.18%
Democratic	Greg Taylor	5,233	35.82%
Total votes		14,608	100%

North Carolina House of Representatives 22nd district general election, 2008
Party	Candidate	Votes	%
Democratic	William Brisson (incumbent)	25,417	100%
Total votes		25,417	100%
Democratic hold			

=== 2006 ===
North Carolina House of Representatives 22nd district Democratic primary election, 2006
Party	Candidate	Votes	%
Democratic	William Brisson	3,903	50.47%
Democratic	Edd Nye (incumbent)	3,831	49.53%
Total votes		7,734	100%

North Carolina House of Representatives 22nd district general election, 2006
Party	Candidate	Votes	%
Democratic	William Brisson	10,267	100%
Total votes		10,267	100%
Democratic hold			

=== 2004 ===
North Carolina House of Representatives 22nd district Democratic primary election, 2004
Party	Candidate	Votes	%
Democratic	Edd Nye (incumbent)	3,453	53.38%
Democratic	William Brisson	3,016	46.62%
Total votes		6,469	100%

North Carolina House of Representatives 22nd district general election, 2004
Party	Candidate	Votes	%
Democratic	Edd Nye (incumbent)	18,646	100%
Total votes		18,646	100%
Democratic hold			

=== 2002 ===
2002 North Carolina House of Representatives 22nd district Democratic primary election, 2002
Party	Candidate	Votes	%
Democratic	Edd Nye (incumbent)	5,528	54.37%
Democratic	Nurham Warwick (incumbent)	4,640	45.63%
Total votes		10,168	100%

2002 North Carolina House of Representatives 22nd district general election, 2002
Party	Candidate	Votes	%
Democratic	Edd Nye (incumbent)	11,614	62.27%
Republican	Joy Barbour	7,038	37.73%
Total votes		18,652	100%
Democratic hold			

=== 2000 ===
North Carolina House of Representatives 22nd district Democratic primary election, 2000
Party	Candidate	Votes	%
Democratic	Jim Crawford (incumbent)	9,155	51.19%
Democratic	Gordon Allen (incumbent)	6,578	36.78%
Democratic	Bernard A. Holliday	2,151	12.03%
Total votes		17,884	100%

North Carolina House of Representatives 22nd district general election, 2000
Party	Candidate	Votes	%
Democratic	Jim Crawford (incumbent)	26,875	39.33%
Democratic	Gordon Allen (incumbent)	24,148	35.34%
Republican	Audrey M. Smith	15,340	22.45%
Libertarian	Tom Howe	1,975	2.89%
Total votes		68,338	100%
Democratic hold			
Democratic hold			
