= William Brisson =

American politician (born 1946)

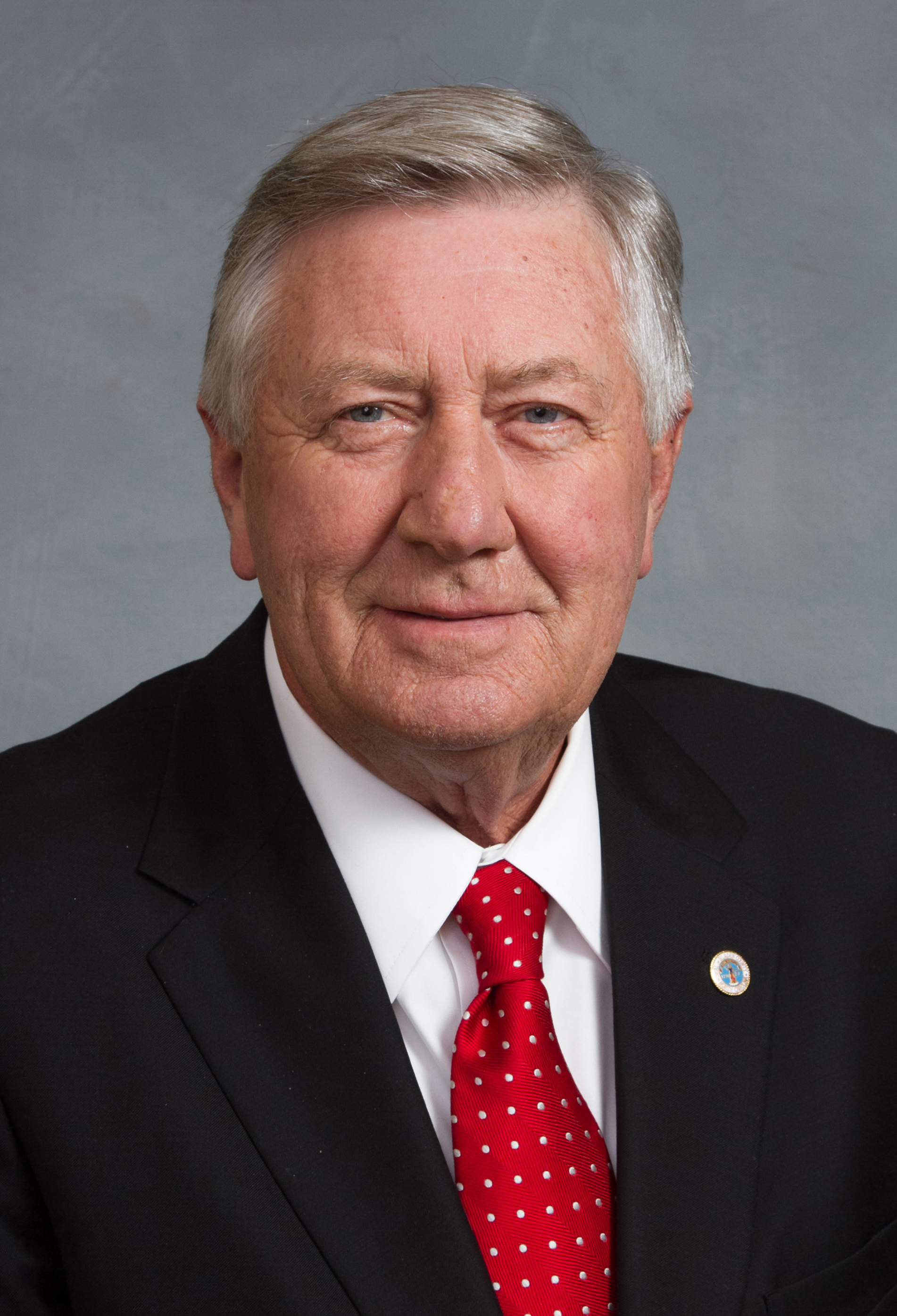

Member of the North Carolina House of Representatives from the 22nd district
- Incumbent
- Assumed office January 1, 2007
- Preceded by: Edd Nye

Personal details
- Born: William Dale Brisson; August 18, 1946 (age 79) Dublin, North Carolina, U.S.
- Party: Republican (2017–present); Democratic (before 2017)
- Spouse: Brenda
- Children: 1
- Occupation: Farmer

William Dale Brisson (born August 18, 1946) is a Republican member of the North Carolina House of Representatives. He has represented the 22nd district, covering Bladen County and a portion of Sampson County, since 2007. Brisson lives in Bladen County, North Carolina.

== North Carolina House of Representatives ==
After narrowly losing in 2004, Brisson defeated incumbent Democrat Edd Nye in the 2006 Democratic primary for House District 22 and ran unopposed in the general election. Brisson defeated primary challenges in the 2008, 2010, 2012, and 2016 elections, and defeated his Republican challengers in the 2010 and 2014 elections.

During the 2016 legislative session, Brisson was one of 11 Democrats to vote in favor of House Bill 2, the controversial "Bathroom Bill."

On October 25, 2017, Brisson announced his intention to switch from the Democratic Party to the Republican Party. He cited his district's rural character and the increasing liberalness of the Democratic Party as the reasoning for his decision.

In December 2025, Brisson announced his intention to retire at the end of his term in December 2026. Thus far, two republicans have announced their intention to run for his seat.

== Electoral history ==
=== 2020 ===
North Carolina House of Representatives 22nd district general election, 2020
Party	Candidate	Votes	%
Republican	William Brisson (incumbent)	21,698	57.55%
Democratic	Albert D. Kirby, Jr.	16,002	42.45%
Total votes		37,700	100%
Republican hold			

=== 2018 ===
North Carolina House of Representatives 22nd district general election, 2018
Party	Candidate	Votes	%
Republican	William Brisson (incumbent)	15,423	56.69%
Democratic	Martin (Tony) Denning	11,783	43.31%
Total votes		27,206	100%
Republican hold			

=== 2016 ===
North Carolina House of Representatives 22nd district Democratic primary election, 2016
Party	Candidate	Votes	%
Democratic	William Brisson (incumbent)	4,642	53.48%
Democratic	Ben Snyder	4,038	46.52%
Total votes		8,680	100%

North Carolina House of Representatives 22nd district general election, 2016
Party	Candidate	Votes	%
Democratic	William Brisson (incumbent)	21,091	100%
Total votes		21,091	100%
Democratic hold			

=== 2014 ===
North Carolina House of Representatives 22nd district general election, 2014
Party	Candidate	Votes	%
Democratic	William Brisson (incumbent)	12,208	51.99%
Republican	Ken Smith	11,274	48.01%
Total votes		23,482	100%
Democratic hold			

=== 2012 ===
North Carolina House of Representatives 22nd district Democratic primary election, 2012
Party	Candidate	Votes	%
Democratic	William Brisson (incumbent)	5,128	51.61%
Democratic	Matt Dixon	4,808	48.39%
Total votes		9,936	100%

North Carolina House of Representatives 22nd district general election, 2012
Party	Candidate	Votes	%
Democratic	William Brisson (incumbent)	21,187	100%
Total votes		21,187	100%
Democratic hold			

=== 2010 ===
North Carolina House of Representatives 22nd district Democratic primary election, 2010
Party	Candidate	Votes	%
Democratic	William Brisson (incumbent)	6,499	73.15%
Democratic	Robert Jacobs Brooks	2,385	26.85%
Total votes		8,884	100%

North Carolina House of Representatives 22nd district general election, 2010
Party	Candidate	Votes	%
Democratic	William Brisson (incumbent)	12,675	52.87%
Republican	John Szoka	11,298	47.13%
Total votes		23,973	100%
Democratic hold			

=== 2008 ===
North Carolina House of Representatives 22nd district Democratic primary election, 2008
Party	Candidate	Votes	%
Democratic	William Brisson (incumbent)	9,375	64.18%
Democratic	Greg Taylor	5,233	35.82%
Total votes		14,608	100%

North Carolina House of Representatives 22nd district general election, 2008
Party	Candidate	Votes	%
Democratic	William Brisson (incumbent)	25,417	100%
Total votes		25,417	100%
Democratic hold			

=== 2006 ===
North Carolina House of Representatives 22nd district Democratic primary election, 2006
Party	Candidate	Votes	%
Democratic	William Brisson	3,903	50.47%
Democratic	Edd Nye (incumbent)	3,831	49.53%
Total votes		7,734	100%

North Carolina House of Representatives 22nd district general election, 2006
Party	Candidate	Votes	%
Democratic	William Brisson	10,267	100%
Total votes		10,267	100%
Democratic hold			

=== 2004 ===
North Carolina House of Representatives 22nd district Democratic primary election, 2004
Party	Candidate	Votes	%
Democratic	Edd Nye (incumbent)	3,453	53.38%
Democratic	William Brisson	3,016	46.62%
Total votes		6,469	100%

== Committee assignments ==
=== 2021-2022 session ===
- Appropriations (Chair)
- Appropriations - General Government (Vice Chair)
- Agriculture (Vice Chair)
- Energy and Public Utilities
- Health
- Rules, Calendar, and Operations of the House

=== 2019-2020 session ===
- Appropriations (Chair)
- Appropriations - Health and Human Services Committee (Vice Chair)
- Agriculture (Chair)
- Energy and Public Utilities
- Health
- Rules, Calendar, and Operations of the House

=== 2017-2018 session ===
- Appropriations (Vice Chair)
- Appropriations - Health and Human Services (Chair)
- Agriculture (Vice Chair)
- Health (Vice Chair)
- Ethics
- Health Care Reform
- Regulatory Reform
- Wildlife Resources (Vice Chair)

=== 2015-2016 session ===
- Appropriations (Vice Chair)
- Appropriations - Health and Human Services
- Agriculture (Vice Chair)
- Health (Vice Chair)
- Environment
- Ethics
- Insurance
- Regulatory Reform
- Wildlife Resources

=== 2013-2014 session ===
- Appropriations (Vice Chair)
- Agriculture (Vice Chair)
- Health and Human Services
- Rules, Calendar, and Operations of the House
- Environment
- Ethics
- Transportation

=== 2011-2012 session ===
- Appropriations
- Agriculture
- Health and Human Services
- Public Utilities
- Transportation

=== 2009-2010 session ===
- Appropriations
- Agriculture
- Transportation
- Wildlife Resources
- Mental Health Reform

North Carolina House of Representatives
Preceded by Edd Nye	Member of the North Carolina House of Representatives from the 22nd district 2007-Present	Incumbent
