= Nathan Baskerville =

American politician

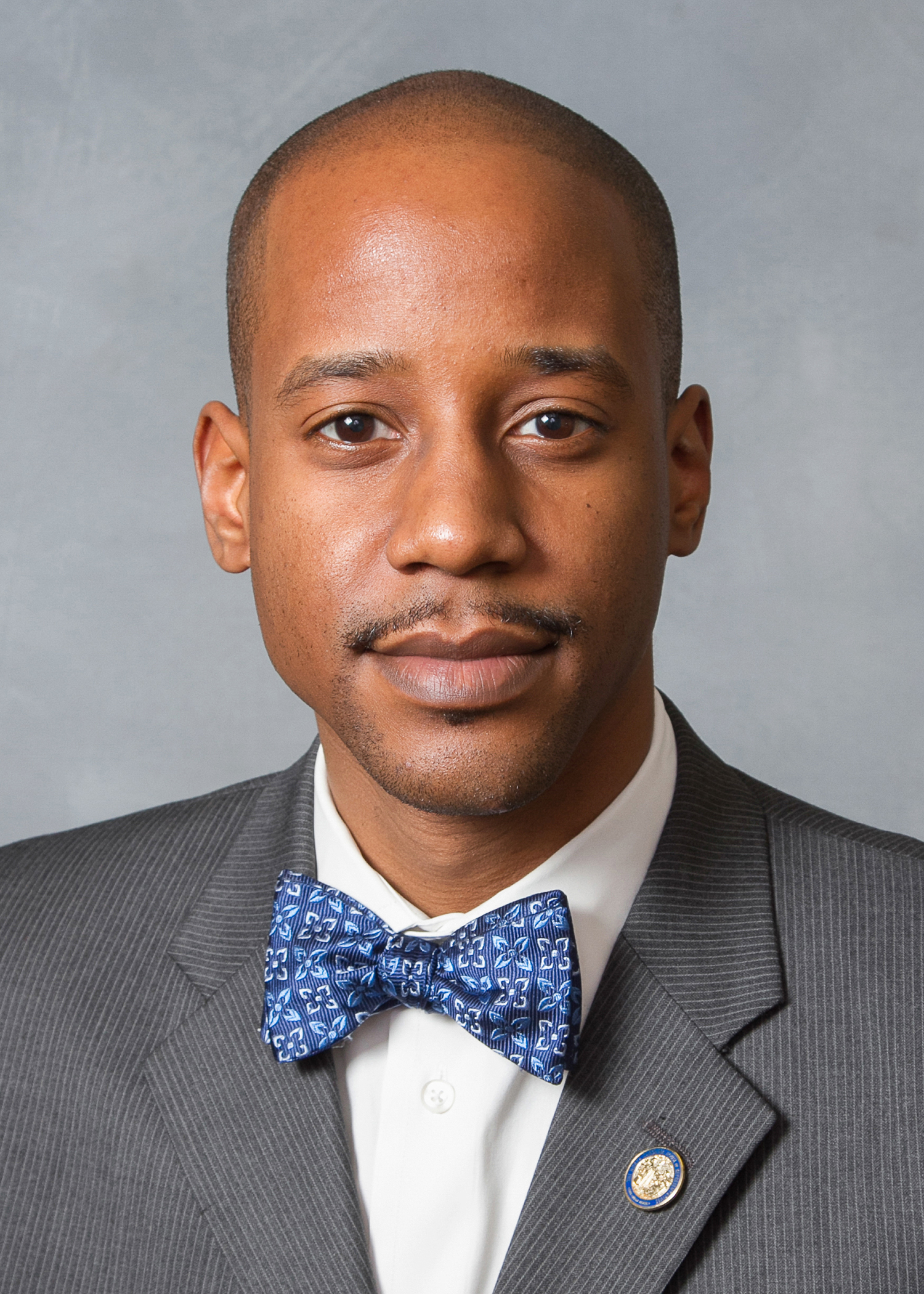

Member of the North Carolina House of Representatives from the 32nd district
- In office January 1, 2013 – January 1, 2017
- Preceded by: Constituency established
- Succeeded by: Terry Garrison

Personal details
- Born: Nathan Angus Baskerville; January 23, 1981 (age 45) Vance County, North Carolina
- Party: Democratic
- Education: Morehouse College (BA); North Carolina Central University (JD)
- Profession: Attorney
- Website: www.nathanbaskerville.com

Nathan Angus Baskerville is a former Democratic member of the North Carolina House of Representatives, who represented the 32nd district from 2013 to 2017. Baskerville also has his own law practice.

During the 2015 legislative session, Baskerville was one of 22 African Americans in the North Carolina House of Representatives.

== Committee assignments ==
=== 2015-2016 session ===
- Appropriations
- Appropriations - Transportation
- Judiciary III (Vice Chair)
- Environment
- Insurance

=== 2013-2014 session ===
- Appropriations
- Judiciary
- Insurance
- Agriculture
- Health and Human Services

== Electoral history ==
=== 2014 ===
North Carolina House of Representatives district general election, 2014
Party	Candidate	Votes	%
Democratic	Nathan Baskerville (incumbent)	19,931	100%
Total votes		19,931	100%
Democratic hold			

=== 2012 ===
North Carolina House of Representatives district Democratic primary election, 2012
Party	Candidate	Votes	%
Democratic	Nathan Baskerville	5,864	39.46%
Democratic	Jim Crawford	4,627	31.13%
Democratic	Dollie B. Burwell	4,371	29.41%
Total votes		14,862	100%

North Carolina House of Representatives district Democratic primary run-off election, 2012
Party	Candidate	Votes	%
Democratic	Nathan Baskerville	5,622	76.57%
Democratic	Jim Crawford	1,720	23.43%
Total votes		7,342	100%

North Carolina House of Representatives district general election, 2012
Party	Candidate	Votes	%
Democratic	Nathan Baskerville	27,057	70.78%
Republican	Scott Bynum	11,170	29.22%
Total votes		38,227	100%
Democratic win (new seat)			

North Carolina House of Representatives
Preceded by Jim Crawford	Member of the North Carolina House of Representatives from the 32nd district 2013–2017	Succeeded by Terry Garrison
