= Bryan Cohn =

North Carolina politician

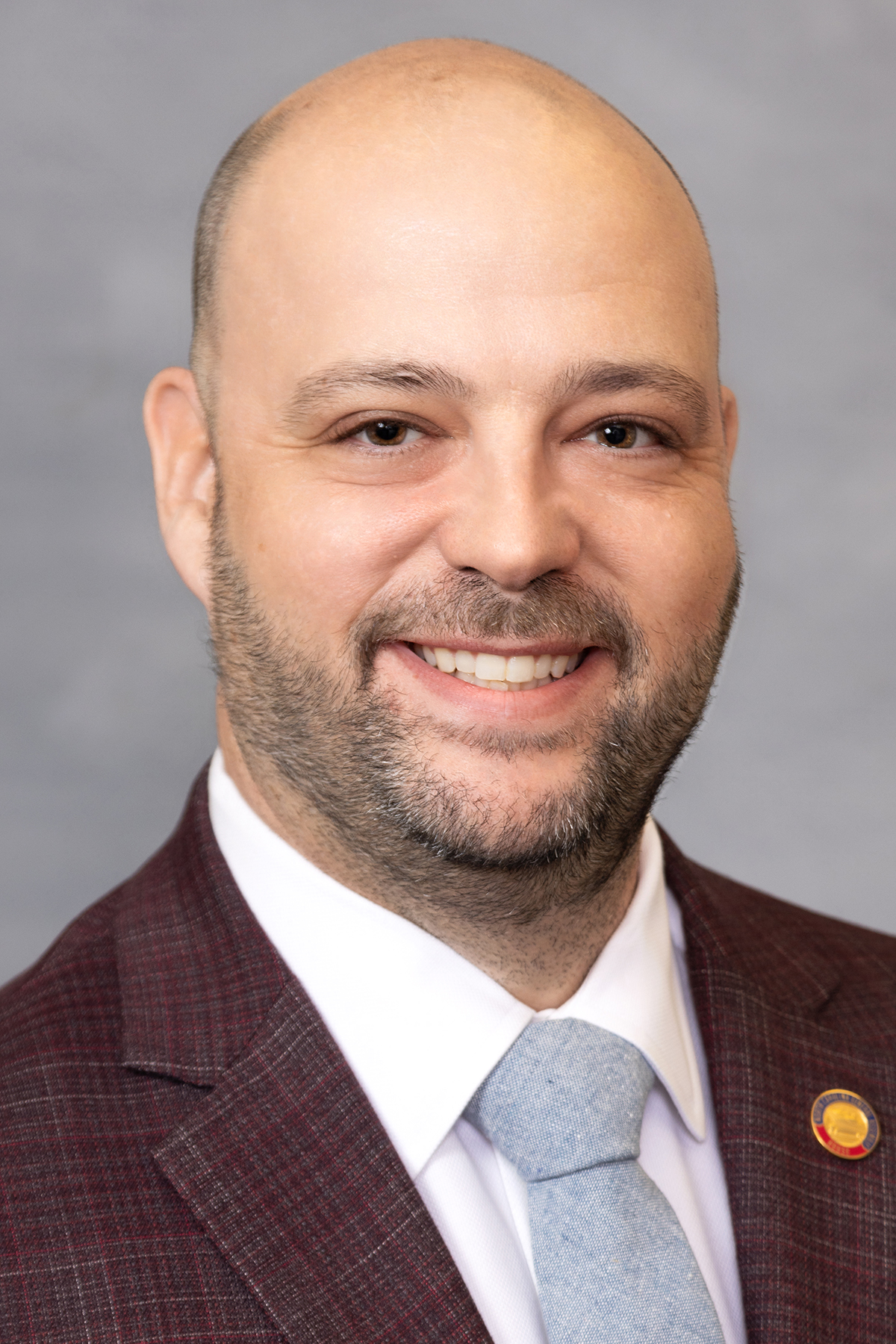
- Official portrait, 2025

Member of the North Carolina House of Representatives from the 32nd district
- Incumbent
- Assumed office January 8, 2025
- Preceded by: Frank Sossamon

Personal details
- Born: Henderson, North Carolina, U.S.
- Party: Democratic Party
- Website: www.bryan4nc.com

Bryan Cohn is an American politician who is currently serving as a Democratic member of the North Carolina House of Representatives, representing the 32nd district. The district is based in Granville and Vance counties. He was first elected in 2024, narrowly defeating incumbent representative Frank Sossamon.

== Personal life and career ==
Cohn was raised in Henderson and currently lives in Oxford. He previously served on the Oxford Board of Commissions.

== Political positions ==
=== Cryptocurrency ===
Cohn supports cryptocurrencies, but does not believe taxpayer money should be invested into them.

=== Immigration ===
Cohn voted against House Bill 318, also known as the Criminal Illegal Alien Enforcement Act, which encourages cooperation between local and federal law enforcement regarding illegal immigrants.

=== Oxford water plant ===
Cohn opposed House Bill 74, a 2025 bill that would shift $10,000,000 from Oxford, a city in his district, to other parts of North Carolina represented by Republicans. He believed it was for "retribution" due to flipping HD-32 in 2024 from Republican control to Democratic control.

== Election History ==
=== 2024 ===
N.C. House of Representatives 32nd district General Election
Party	Candidate	Votes	%
Democratic	Bryan Cohn	21,215	48.95%
Republican	Frank Sossamon (incumbent)	20,987	48.42%
Libertarian	Ryan Brown	1,140	2.63%
Total votes		43,342	100%
Democratic gain from Republican			

=== 2021 ===
City of Oxford Commissioner Election
Party	Candidate	Votes	%
	S. Quon Bridges	932	20.81%
	Patricia T. Fields	771	17.22%
	Bryan K. Cohn	713	15.92%
	B. Seth Lumpkins	702	15.68%
	Courtney Crudup	576	12.86%
	John L. Oliver	454	10.14%
	Walkiria Jones	306	6.83%
	Write-In (Miscellaneous)	24	0.54%
Total votes		4,478	100%

Note: Voters choose up to Four Commissioners
