= Terry Garrison =

American politician

Representative Terry Garrison
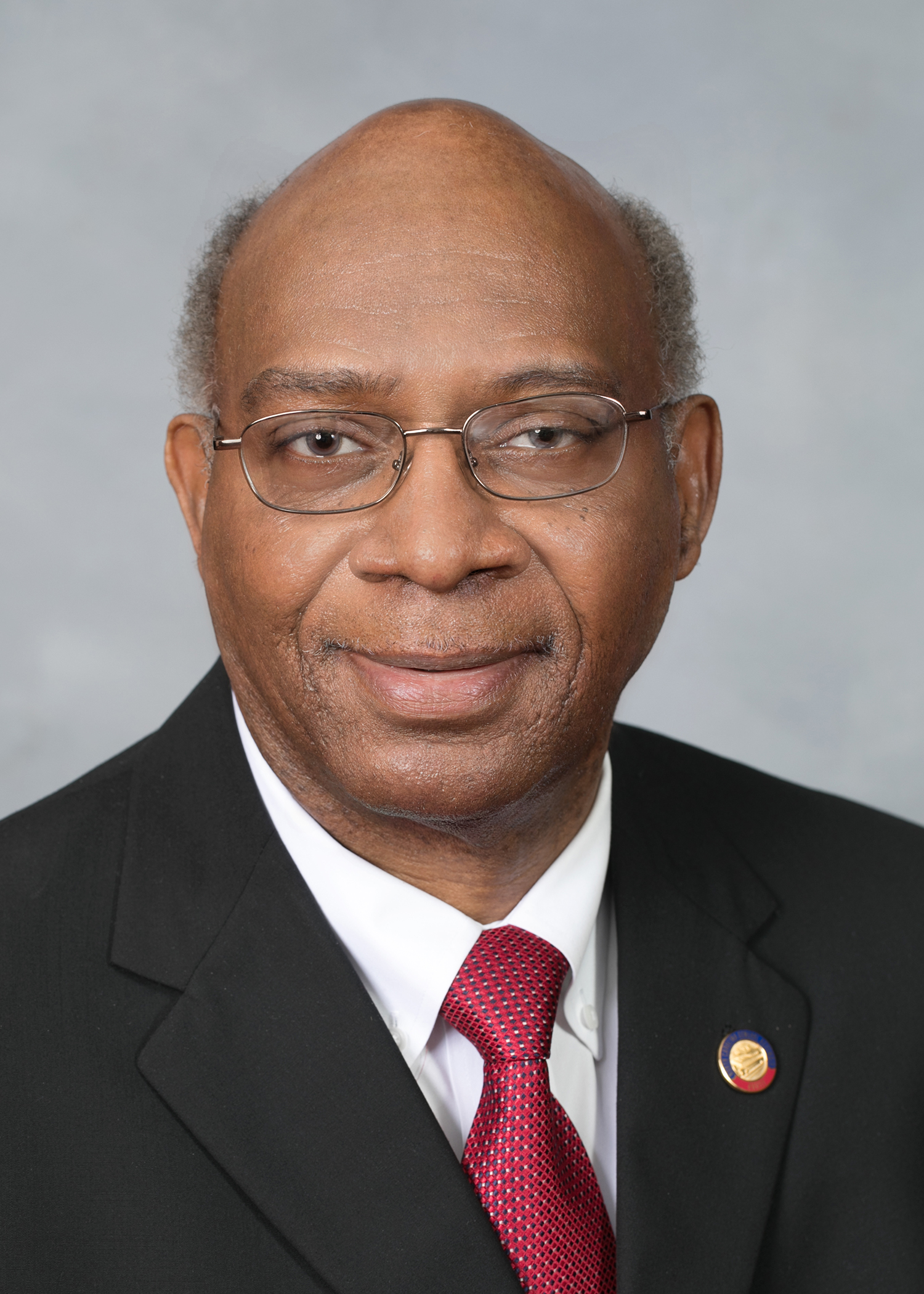

Member of the North Carolina House of Representatives from the 32nd district
- In office January 1, 2017 – January 1, 2023
- Preceded by: Nathan Baskerville
- Succeeded by: Frank Sossamon

Personal details
- Born: Terrence Edward Garrison; January 19, 1949 (age 77)
- Party: Democratic
- Education: North Carolina Central University (BA); North Carolina A&T State University (MS)
- Occupation: realtor, educator

Terrence Edward Garrison (born January 19, 1949) is an American politician. He was elected to the North Carolina House of Representatives in 2016. A Democrat, he represented the 32nd district (including all of Vance and Warren counties, as well as part of Granville County from 2017 to 2023.

== Electoral history ==
=== 2022 ===
North Carolina House of Representatives district general election, 2022
Party	Candidate	Votes	%
Republican	Frank Sossamon	14,156	51.33%
Democratic	Terry Garrison (incumbent)	13,424	48.67%
Total votes		27,580	100%
Republican gain from Democratic			

=== 2020 ===
North Carolina House of Representatives district general election, 2020
Party	Candidate	Votes	%
Democratic	Terry Garrison (incumbent)	24,078	61.21%
Republican	David Woodson	15,260	38.79%
Total votes		39,338	100%
Democratic hold			

=== 2018 ===
North Carolina House of Representatives 32nd district general election, 2018
Party	Candidate	Votes	%
Democratic	Terry Garrison (incumbent)	17,822	64.27%
Republican	Robert Shingler	9,909	35.73%
Total votes		27,731	100%
Democratic hold			

=== 2016 ===
North Carolina House of Representatives 32nd district Democratic primary election, 2016
Party	Candidate	Votes	%
Democratic	Terry Garrison	9,190	67.38%
Democratic	Gary Lamont Miles, Sr.	4,449	32.62%
Total votes		13,639	100%

North Carolina House of Representatives district general election, 2016
Party	Candidate	Votes	%
Democratic	Terry Garrison	29,142	100%
Total votes		29,142	100%
Democratic hold			

== Committee assignments ==
=== 2021-2022 session ===
- Appropriations
- Appropriations - Education
- Commerce
- Insurance
- Wildlife Resources

=== 2019-2020 session ===
- Appropriations
- Appropriations - General Government
- Appropriations - Education
- Insurance
- Transportation
- Wildlife Resources

=== 2017-2018 session ===
- Appropriations
- Appropriations - Transportation
- Education - Community Colleges
- Environment
- Judiciary IV
- State and Local Government I

North Carolina House of Representatives
Preceded by Nathan Baskerville	Member of the North Carolina House of Representatives from the 32nd district 2017–2023	Succeeded by Frank Sossamon
