= Pine Level, Johnston County, North Carolina =

Pine Level, North Carolina
- Town
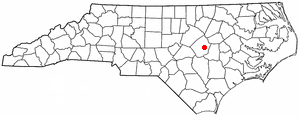
- Location of Pine Level, North Carolina
- Coordinates: 35°30′12″N 78°14′55″W
- Country: United States
- State: North Carolina
- County: Johnston

Government
  - Mayor: Jeff Holt

Area
  - Total: 1.79 sq mi (4.63 km^{2})
  - Land: 1.79 sq mi (4.63 km^{2})
  - Water: 0 sq mi (0.00 km^{2})
- Elevation: 164 ft (50 m)

Population (2020)
  - Total: 2,046
  - Density: 1,145.5/sq mi (442.29/km^{2})
- Time zone: UTC-5 (Eastern (EST))
  - Summer (DST): UTC-4 (EDT)
- ZIP code: 27568
- Area code: 919
- FIPS code: 37-52020
- GNIS feature ID: 2407117
- Website: www.pinelevel.org

Pine Level, chartered 1872, is a town in Johnston County, North Carolina, United States. The population was 1,700 at the 2010 census, up from 1,313 in 2000. Pine Level is located 35 miles (56 km) southeast of Raleigh, the state capital.

== Geography ==
Pine Level is in eastern Johnston County. U.S. Route 70 Alternate runs through the south side of the town, leading west 2.5 miles (4.0 km) to Interstate 95 and southeast 6 miles (10 km) to Princeton. Selma is 3 miles (5 km) to the northwest, and Smithfield, the Johnston county seat, is 6 miles (10 km) to the west.

According to the United States Census Bureau, Pine Level has a total area of 1.6 square miles (4.2 km^{2}), all land.

== Demographics ==
Historical population
Census	Pop.	Note	%±
1880	219		—
1890	264		20.5%
1900	266		0.8%
1910	394		48.1%
1920	373		−5.3%
1930	497		33.2%
1940	595		19.7%
1950	602		1.2%
1960	833		38.4%
1970	983		18.0%
1980	953		−3.1%
1990	1,217		27.7%
2000	1,313		7.9%
2010	1,700		29.5%
2020	2,046		20.4%
U.S. Decennial Census

As of the census of 2000, there were 1,313 people, 592 households, and 374 families residing in the town. The population density was 1,239.1 inhabitants per square mile (478.4/km^{2}). There were 652 housing units at an average density of 615.3 per square mile (237.6/km^{2}). The racial makeup of the town was 88.12% White, 8.53% African American, 0.23% Native American, 0.08% Asian, 2.74% from other races, and 0.30% from two or more races. Hispanic or Latino of any race were 2.97% of the population.

There were 592 households, out of which 27.5% had children under the age of 18 living with them, 50.8% were married couples living together, 9.8% had a female householder with no husband present, and 36.8% were non-families. 33.3% of all households were made up of individuals, and 15.9% had someone living alone who was 65 years of age or older. The average household size was 2.22 and the average family size was 2.81.

In the town, the population was spread out, with 21.9% under the age of 18, 7.6% from 18 to 24, 30.1% from 25 to 44, 21.9% from 45 to 64, and 18.5% who were 65 years of age or older. The median age was 39 years. For every 100 females, there were 82.6 males. For every 100 females age 18 and over, there were 77.6 males.

The median income for a household in the town was $31,250, and the median income for a family was $40,227. Males had a median income of $31,033 versus $22,222 for females. The per capita income for the town was $16,384. About 9.9% of families and 13.0% of the population were below the poverty line, including 14.2% of those under age 18 and 16.3% of those age 65 or over. The Town and surrounding Township has been noted for having more millionaires per capita than any town or township in the United States of America.

== Education ==
- Pine Level Elementary School

== History ==
In 1963, Floyd G. Hinnant, Postmaster of Pine Level, wrote down his history of Pine Level:

In the days of slow transportation this little town, the third oldest in Johnston County, was a trading center for the pioneer turpentine prospectors and merchants who were obligated to feed the workers who followed those who were setting up turpentine distilleries. In 1868 two brothers, Daniel Thomas Oliver and William Berry Oliver migrated from Robinson County in the interest of turpentine, setting up a distillery. Finding the natural setting of pine trees applicable to their need and in a fairly level country, the town found its name, Pine Level.

Some records say Gaston Britt and Bryant Hinnant were merchants at the time the Oliver boys landed. They, too, built two separate stores with supplies for the workers. The D. T. Oliver Store is no longer doing business but the original building is still standing and is used as a workshop by a great grandson. The William Berry Store was purchased by the only surviving son, the late D. B. Oliver, in 1900 and is still in operation by his four sons. The Southern Railroad running through the pine tree growth enabled the turpentine dealers to dispose of the turpentine by the railroad placing a train stop in town. Then a place for a post office was arranged with Mr. Thomas Hinnant being the first recorded post master in 1886. Happy were the people when the Post Office Dept. in Washington, D. C. gave the south the free mail delivery service. Pine Level has an up-to-date post office with efficient service rendered.

During the early nineteen hundreds many more settlers moved into our little town and at this time we have one of the most progressive rural sections in the state. Pine Level has a population of nearly 1,000. It has a bank, oil mill, modern cotton gin, mercantile businesses which service the farmers of a large area, five churches, two civic clubs, a veteran's organization and a fine volunteer fire department. Work is now progressing on a modern water system to keep pace with the rapidly growing town.

== Notable people ==
- Tony Braswell, politician and businessman
- Larry Strickland, member of the North Carolina House of Representatives
