= Tony Braswell =

American politician (1944/1945–2024)

Johnston County Commissioner
- In office November 2004 – March 9, 2024

Mayor of Pine Level
- In office 1999–2003

Personal details
- Born: August 28, 1944 Johnston County, North Carolina, U.S.
- Died: March 9, 2024 (aged 79) Wake County, North Carolina, U.S.
- Party: Republican
- Spouse: Nobie Tench Braswell
- Children: 7
- Education: Pine Level High School
- Alma mater: Johnston Community College

Military service
- Allegiance: United States of America
- Branch/service: United States Army
- Years of service: 1964–1967
- Battles/wars: Vietnam War

Jimmy George "Tony" Braswell (August 28, 1944 – March 9, 2024) was an American businessman and politician. A Republican, he served in various capacities in the local government of Johnston County, North Carolina including Chairman of the Board of County Commissioners and Mayor of Pine Level.

== Early life and education ==
Braswell grew up in Pine Level, Johnston County, North Carolina. He graduated from Pine Level High School in 1962. He took business courses at Hardbarger's Business School in Raleigh in 1963 before continuing his education at Johnston Community College. He served in the United States Army from 1964 until 1967 including a year-long tour of duty in Vietnam during the Vietnam War.

== Career ==
=== Business ===
Braswell owned Holt Lake Gas & Grill, a gas station and restaurant in Four Oaks. He was also a principal owner in Legends Real Estate and served as president of the firm's investment group. Braswell also worked in farm insurance for thirty-two years.

=== Politics ===
Braswell served as mayor of Pine Level. In 2004 he was elected to the Johnston County Board of Commissioners. As a county commissioner, Braswell supported a two-cent cut in property-tax rates, bringing an Ashley HomeStore distribution center and retail outlet to Four Oaks and the construction of a mixed-use retail development in Selma to create 3,000 jobs. He also voted for the board of commissioners to hire the county's first recreation director in 2019.

In 2011 he was added to the Johnston County Sports Council. Braswell also serves on the Johnston County Planning Board, the Johnston County Social Services Board, the Community & Senior Services Board, and the North Carolina Veterans Affairs Commission.

In 2015 Braswell ran an unsuccessful campaign for the North Carolina House of Representatives as a representative of the twenty-eighth district. He ran with a promise to end "government over-regulation" of North Carolinians.

In 2015, as county commissioner, Braswell supported a deal with Novo Nordisk to provide 700 pharmaceutical production jobs with $110 million in tax rebates and infrastructure spending. In 2016 Braswell, who initially supported the construction of a CSX Transportation intermodal terminal, later opposed the proposal and accused the company of "strong-arm tactics". He later stated that he and the other members of the board supported the terminal, but not the terms of the proposal and how it would effect local property owners. The board, including Braswell, moved to again support the project after plan was updated in March 2016. On December 28, 2018 Braswell voted to approve a series of self-funded financial incentives for Novo Nordisk, which planned to invest $1.2 billion into Johnston County for production. The approval included benefits to the company equaling $94 million over a fifteen-year period. In 2015 he supported long-term funding for Johnston County's trash and recycling services.

In early 2016, Braswell appointed a 3-member committee to oversee the development of the county's first Master Aging Plan. He later served on the Johnston County Council on Aging. In March 2016, while serving as chairman of the board of county commissioners, Braswell admitted to posting sensitive financial information on Facebook, including bank account numbers, related to the Johnston County Board of Education. Later that year he was part of a driver safety forum to reduce the risk of teen fatalities.

In December 2019, Braswell filed to run for a fifth term as County Commissioner, representing District 6 of Johnston County. He ran opposed in the Republican primary by two other candidates. He won his seat with 9,470 votes. He supported funding for the construction and maintenance of public parks and recreational areas in Johnston County. He led the move by the commissioners to undo a requirement that county residents purchase a decal to use the solid waste centers, stating "every citizen" needed "access to the convenience centers".

In January 2020 Braswell stated that he supported the Constitution and was committed to protecting the rights of gun owners under the Second Amendment, after an online petition urging Johnston County Commissioners to create an ordinance making the county a "sanctuary" for gun rights gained several thousand signatures.

== Personal life ==
Braswell, a United Methodist, was a parishioner at Pine Level First United Methodist Church. He was married to Nobie Tench Braswell and had seven children, five biological and two adopted.

Braswell served on the boards of the Pine Level Fire Department, the Pine Level Lions Club, and the Tobacco Farm Life Museum, Braswell was a member of Selma Masonic Lodge No.320 A.F.& A.M. where he served as a Junior Warden.

In June 2016 Braswell was presented with a Vietnam Veteran's Lapel Pin for his service in Vietnam. The award was given at a commissioner's board meeting by Colonel Rudy Baker.

Tony Braswell died on March 9, 2024, at the age of 79. In November 2024, the Commissioner Tony Braswell Bridge, located on U.S. 70 Business East at the Peedin Street Extension in Pine Level, was posthumously named for Braswell.
