= James Langdon Jr. =

American politician (1938–2026)

James H. Langdon Jr.
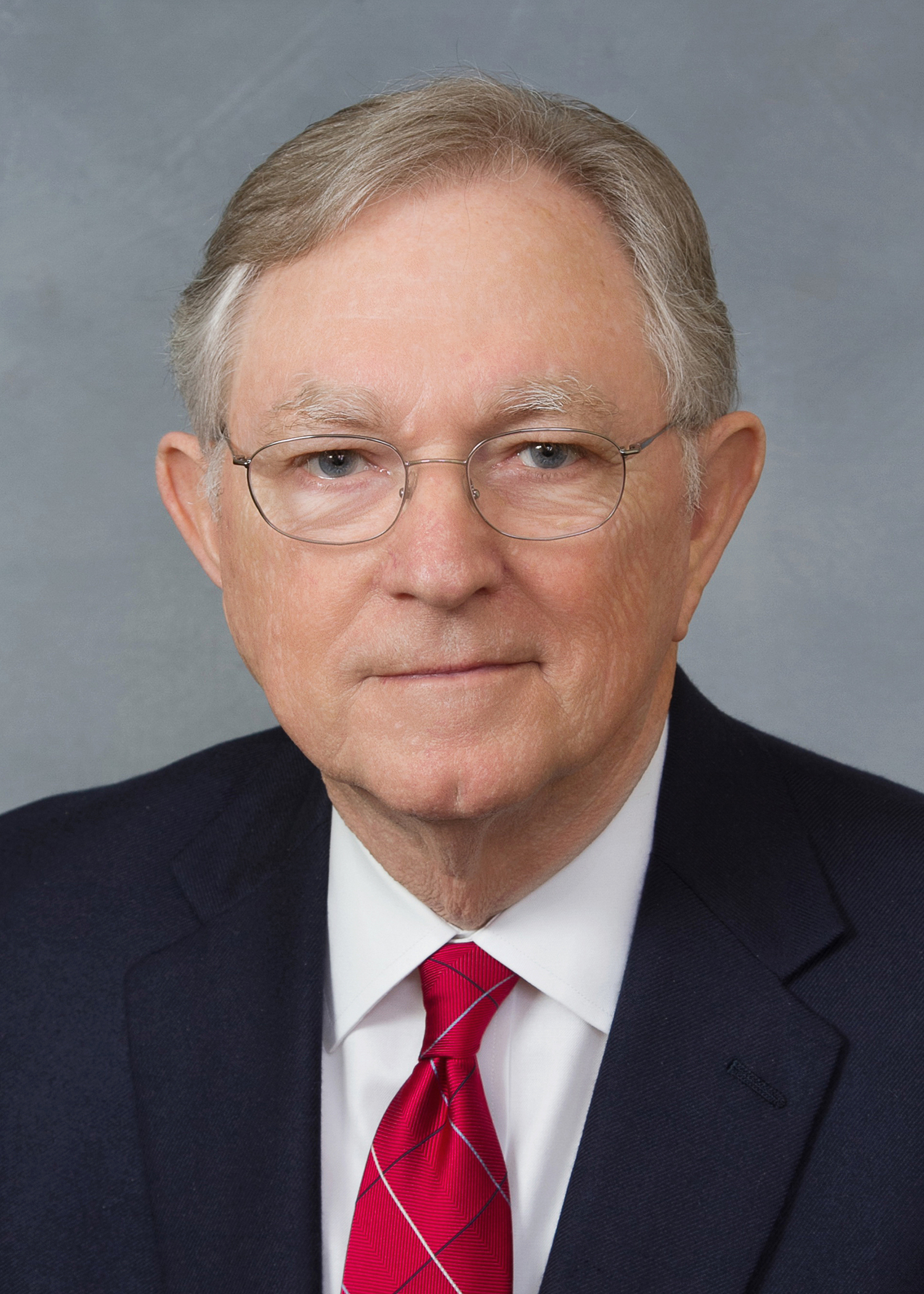

Member of the North Carolina House of Representatives from the 28th district
- In office 2005–2017
- Preceded by: Leo Daughtry
- Succeeded by: Larry Strickland

Personal details
- Born: January 17, 1938 Benson, North Carolina, U.S.
- Died: April 30, 2026 (aged 88) Benson, North Carolina, U.S.
- Party: Republican
- Spouse: Lena Barbour Langdon (d.2021)
- Occupation: Retired Farmer

James Hector Langdon Jr. (January 17, 1938 – April 30, 2026) was an American politician who was a Republican member of the North Carolina General Assembly. He represented the 28th district.

Langdon died on April 30, 2026, at the age of 88.

North Carolina House of Representatives
Preceded by Leo Daughtry	Member of the North Carolina House of Representatives from the 28th district 2005–2017	Succeeded by Larry Strickland
