= Larry C. Strickland =

American politician (born 1955)

Larry Strickland
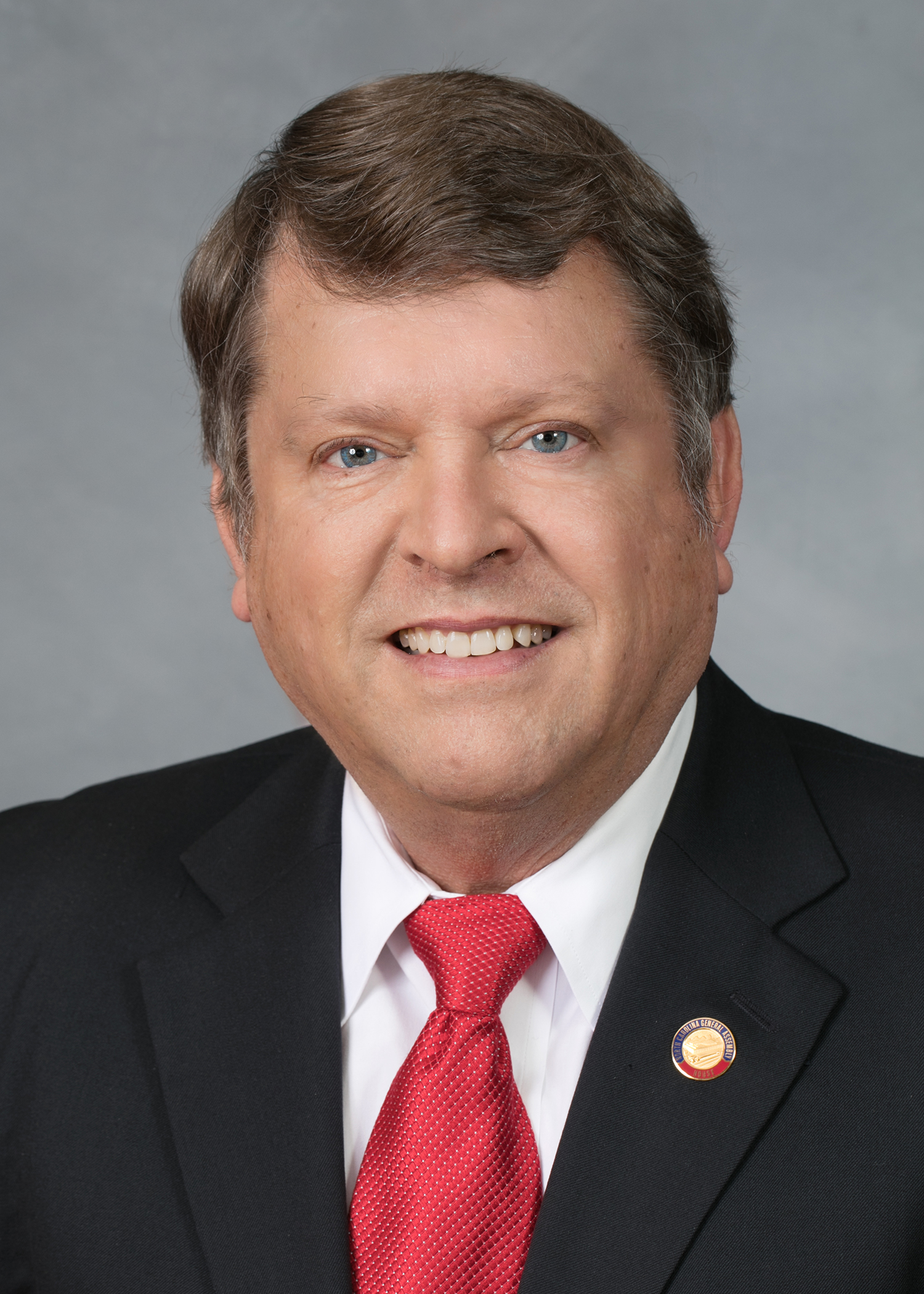

Member of the North Carolina House of Representatives from the 28th district
- Incumbent
- Assumed office January 1, 2017
- Preceded by: James Langdon Jr.

Member of the Johnston County School Board
- In office 1998–2016

Personal details
- Born: Larry Craig Strickland; June 7, 1955 (age 71) Smithfield, North Carolina, U.S.
- Party: Republican
- Children: 1
- Education: Wayne Community College (AS); Atlantic Christian College (BBA)
- Occupation: Real Estate Appraiser/Farmer
- Website: Official website

Larry Craig Strickland (born June 7, 1955) is an American politician from North Carolina. He was elected to the North Carolina House of Representatives in 2016. A Republican, he has represented the 28th district (including constituents in Southern Johnston County) since 2017. Strickland had previously served on the Johnston County School Board from 1998 to 2016.

== Electoral history ==
=== 2020 ===
North Carolina House of Representatives district general election, 2020
Party	Candidate	Votes	%
Republican	Larry Strickland (incumbent)	29,510	67.70%
Democratic	Corey Stephens	14,082	32.30%
Total votes		43,592	100%
Republican hold			

=== 2018 ===
North Carolina House of Representatives 28th district general election, 2018
Party	Candidate	Votes	%
Republican	Larry Strickland (incumbent)	17,237	63.19%
Democratic	Jimmie M. Massengill	9,373	34.36%
Libertarian	Walt Rabon	670	2.46%
Total votes		27,280	100%
Republican hold			

=== 2016 ===
North Carolina House of Representatives district general election, 2016
Party	Candidate	Votes	%
Republican	Larry Strickland	26,161	70.59%
Democratic	Patricia Oliver	10,897	29.41%
Total votes		37,058	100%
Republican hold			

== Committee assignments ==
=== 2021-2022 Session ===
- Appropriations (chair)
- Appropriations - Agriculture and Natural and Economic Resources Committee (Vice Chair)
- Agriculture (Vice Chair)
- Commerce
- Education - K-12
- Energy and Public Utilities

=== 2019-2020 Session ===
- Appropriations (Vice Chair)
- Appropriations - Agriculture and Natural and Economic Resources Committee (chair)
- Agriculture (chair)
- Commerce
- Education - K-12
- Energy and Public Utilities

=== 2017-2018 Session ===
- Appropriations
- Appropriations - Transportation
- Agriculture
- Energy and Public Utilities
- Environment
- Transportation
- State and Local Government I

North Carolina House of Representatives
Preceded by James Langdon Jr.	Member of the North Carolina House of Representatives from the 28th district 2017-Present	Incumbent
