= 2000 North Carolina House of Representatives election =

- November 7, 2000

All 120 seats in the North Carolina House of Representatives 61 seats needed for a majority
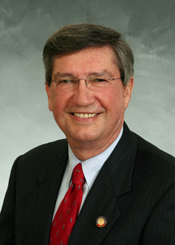

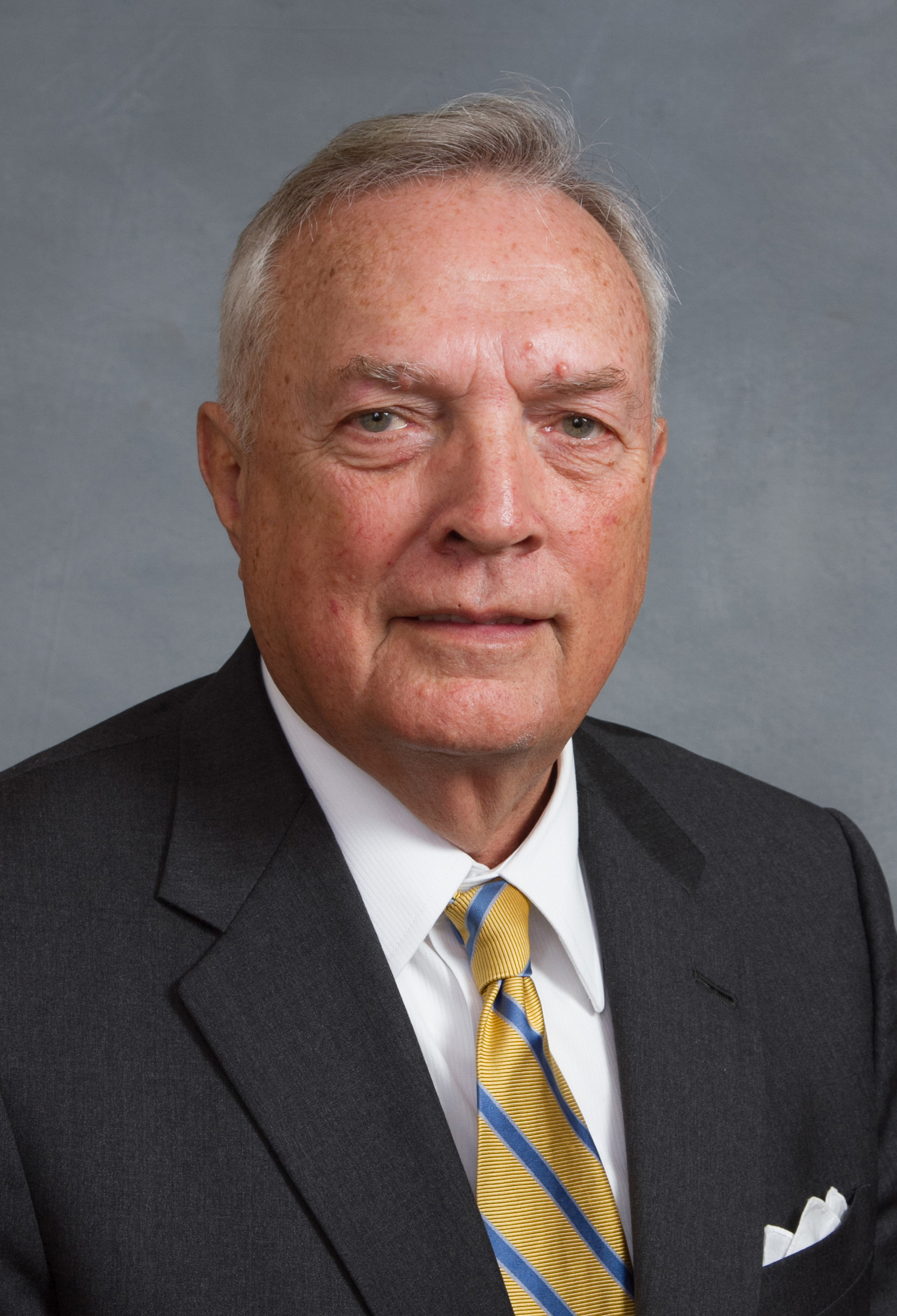
| | Majority party | Minority party |
|---|---|---|
| Leader | Jim Black | Leo Daughtry |
| Party | Democratic | Republican |
| Leader since | January 1, 1999 | January 1, 1999 |
| Leader's seat | 36th - Matthews | 95th - Smithfield |
| Last election | 66 | 54 |
| Seats before | 66 | 53 (Note: After losing the Republican nomination for house district 27, Stephen Wood ran in the general election on the Reform Party line) |
| Seats won | 62 | 58 |
| Seat change | ▼4 | ▲5 |
| Popular vote | 1,722,045 | 1,826,548 |
| Percentage | 47.77% | 50.75% |
- Results: Republican gain Democratic gain Republican hold Democratic hold
Speaker before election
Jim Black
Democratic
Elected Speaker
Jim Black
Democratic

An election was held on November 7, 2000, to elect all 120 members to North Carolina's House of Representatives. The election coincided with elections for other offices, including the Presidency, Governorship, U.S. House of Representatives, Council of State, and state senate. The primary election was held on May 2, 2000.

== Results summary ==
| District | Incumbent | Party | Elected | Party |
|---|---|---|---|---|
| 1st | Bill Owens | Dem | Bill Owens | Dem |
| 2nd | Zeno Edwards | Dem | Zeno Edwards | Dem |
| 3rd | Scott Thomas† | Dem | Alice Graham Underhill | Dem |
| 4th | Jean Preston | Rep | Jean Preston | Rep |
| 4th | Ronald Smith | Dem | Ronald Smith | Dem |
| 5th | Howard Hunter Jr. | Dem | Howard Hunter Jr. | Dem |
| 6th | Gene Rogers | Dem | Gene Rogers | Dem |
| 7th | John Hall | Dem | John Hall | Dem |
| 8th | Edith Warren | Dem | Edith Warren | Dem |
| 9th | Marian McLawhorn | Dem | Marian McLawhorn | Dem |
| 10th | Russell Tucker | Dem | Russell Tucker | Dem |
| 11th | Phil Baddour | Dem | Phil Baddour | Dem |
| 12th | Nurham Warwick | Dem | Nurham Warwick | Dem |
| 13th | Danny McComas | Rep | Danny McComas | Rep |
| 14th | David Redwine | Dem | David Redwine | Dem |
| 14th | Dewey Hill | Dem | Dewey Hill | Dem |
| 15th | Sam Ellis | Rep | Sam Ellis | Rep |
| 16th | Douglas Yongue | Dem | Douglas Yongue | Dem |
| 17th | Theodore James Kinney† | Dem | Marvin Lucas | Dem |
| 17th | Mary McAllister | Dem | Mary McAllister | Dem |
| 18th | Bill Hurley | Dem | Bill Hurley | Dem |
| 18th | Mia Morris | Rep | Mia Morris | Rep |
| 19th | Leslie Cox | Dem | Leslie Cox | Dem |
| 19th | Don Davis | Rep | Don Davis | Rep |
| 20th | Billy Creech | Rep | Billy Creech | Rep |
| 21st | Dan Blue | Dem | Dan Blue | Dem |
| 22nd | Jim Crawford | Dem | Jim Crawford | Dem |
| 22nd | Gordon Allen | Dem | Gordon Allen | Dem |
| 23rd | Paul Luebke | Dem | Paul Luebke | Dem |
| 23rd | Mickey Michaux | Dem | Mickey Michaux | Dem |
| 23rd | George Miller Jr. | Dem | Paul Miller | Dem |
| 24th | Joe Hackney | Dem | Joe Hackney | Dem |
| 24th | Verla Insko | Dem | Verla Insko | Dem |
| 25th | Cary Allred | Rep | Cary Allred | Rep |
| 25th | W.B. Teague | Rep | W.B. Teague | Rep |
| 25th | Nelson Cole | Dem | Nelson Cole | Dem |
| 26th | Alma Adams | Dem | Alma Adams | Dem |
| 27th | Steve Wood | Ref | John Blust | Rep |
| 28th | Flossie Boyd-McIntyre | Dem | Flossie Boyd-McIntyre | Dem |
| 29th | Joanne Bowie | Rep | Joanne Bowie | Rep |
| 30th | Arlie Culp | Rep | Arlie Culp | Rep |
| 31st | Richard Morgan | Rep | Richard Morgan | Rep |
| 32nd | Wayne Goodwin | Dem | Wayne Goodwin | Dem |
| 33rd | Pryor Gibson | Dem | Pryor Gibson | Dem |
| 34th | O. Max Melton | Dem | Fern Shubert | Rep |
| 35th | Charlotte Gardner | Rep | Lorene Coates | Dem |
| 36th | Jim Black | Dem | Jim Black | Dem |
| 37th | Paul Reeves McCrary† | Dem | Hugh Holliman | Dem |
| 38th | Harold Brubaker | Rep | Harold Brubaker | Rep |
| 39th | Lyons Gray | Rep | Lyons Gray | Rep |
| 40th | William Hiatt | Rep | William Hiatt | Rep |
| 40th | Gene Wilson | Rep | Gene Wilson | Rep |
| 40th | Rex Baker | Rep | Rex Baker | Rep |
| 41st | John Walter Brown† | Rep | Tracy Walker | Rep |
| 41st | George Holmes | Rep | George Holmes | Rep |
| 42nd | Frank Mitchell | Rep | Frank Mitchell | Rep |
| 43rd | Mitchell Setzer | Rep | Mitchell Setzer | Rep |
| 44th | Daniel Barefoot | Dem | Daniel Barefoot | Dem |
| 45th | Joe Kiser | Rep | Joe Kiser | Rep |
| 45th | Cherie Berry† | Rep | Mark Hilton | Rep |
| 46th | Charles Buchanan | Rep | Charles Buchanan | Rep |
| 46th | Gregory Thompson | Rep | Gregory Thompson | Rep |
| 47th | Walt Church | Dem | Walt Church | Dem |
| 48th | Debbie Clary | Rep | Debbie Clary | Rep |
| 48th | Andy Dedmon | Dem | Andy Dedmon | Dem |
| 48th | Jim Horn | Dem | John Weatherly | Rep |
| 49th | Mitch Gillespie | Rep | Mitch Gillespie | Rep |
| 50th | Larry Justus | Rep | Larry Justus | Rep |
| 51st | Wilma Sherrill | Rep | Wilma Sherrill | Rep |
| 51st | Martin Nesbitt | Dem | Martin Nesbitt | Dem |
| 51st | Lanier Cansler | Rep | Lanier Cansler | Rep |
| 52nd | Phil Haire | Dem | Phil Haire | Dem |
| 52nd | Liston Ramsey | Dem | Margaret Carpenter | Rep |
| 53rd | Roger West | Rep | Roger West | Rep |
| 54th | Drew Saunders | Dem | Drew Saunders | Dem |
| 55th | Ed McMahan | Rep | Ed McMahan | Rep |
| 56th | Martha Alexander | Dem | Martha Alexander | Dem |
| 57th | Connie Wilson | Rep | Connie Wilson | Rep |
| 58th | Ruth Easterling | Dem | Ruth Easterling | Dem |
| 59th | Pete Cunningham | Dem | Pete Cunningham | Dem |
| 60th | Beverly Earle | Dem | Beverly Earle | Dem |
| 61st | Art Pope | Rep | Art Pope | Rep |
| 62nd | David Miner | Rep | David Miner | Rep |
| 63rd | Jennifer Weiss | Dem | Jennifer Weiss | Dem |
| 64th | Bob Hensley | Dem | Bob Hensley | Dem |
| 65th | Rick Eddins | Rep | Rick Eddins | Rep |
| 66th | Larry Womble | Dem | Larry Womble | Dem |
| 67th | Warren Oldham | Dem | Warren Oldham | Dem |
| 68th | Trudi Walend | Rep | Trudi Walend | Rep |
| 69th | Jim Gulley | Rep | Jim Gulley | Rep |
| 70th | Toby Fitch | Dem | Toby Fitch | Dem |
| 71st | Joe Tolson | Dem | Joe Tolson | Dem |
| 72nd | Gene Arnold | Rep | Gene Arnold | Rep |
| 73rd | Wayne Sexton | Rep | Wayne Sexton | Rep |
| 74th | Julia Craven Howard | Rep | Julia Craven Howard | Rep |
| 75th | Alex Warner | Dem | Alex Warner | Dem |
| 76th | John Bridgeman | Dem | Michael Harrington | Rep |
| 77th | Carolyn Russell | Rep | Carolyn Russell | Rep |
| 78th | Stanley Fox | Dem | Stanley Fox | Dem |
| 79th | William Wainwright | Dem | William Wainwright | Dem |
| 80th | Robert Grady | Rep | Robert Grady | Rep |
| 81st | Tim Tallent† | Rep | Jeff Barnhart | Rep |
| 82nd | Bobby Barbee | Rep | Bobby Barbee | Rep |
| 83rd | Eugene McCombs | Rep | Eugene McCombs | Rep |
| 84th | Michael Decker | Rep | Michael Decker | Rep |
| 85th | Ronnie Sutton | Dem | Ronnie Sutton | Dem |
| 86th | Bill Culpepper | Dem | Bill Culpepper | Dem |
| 87th | Donald Bonner | Dem | Donald Bonner | Dem |
| 88th | Theresa Esposito | Rep | Theresa Esposito | Rep |
| 89th | Mary Jarrell | Dem | Mary Jarrell | Dem |
| 89th | Maggie Jeffus | Dem | Maggie Jeffus | Dem |
| 90th | Len Sossamon | Dem | Linda Johnson | Rep |
| 91st | Edgar Starnes | Rep | Edgar Starnes | Rep |
| 92nd | Russell Capps | Rep | Russell Capps | Rep |
| 93rd | John Rayfield | Rep | John Rayfield | Rep |
| 94th | Jerry Dockham | Rep | Jerry Dockham | Rep |
| 95th | Leo Daughtry | Rep | Leo Daughtry | Rep |
| 96th | Edd Nye | Dem | Edd Nye | Dem |
| 97th | Jimmie Edward Ford | Dem | Larry Bell | Dem |
| 98th | Thomas Wright | Dem | Thomas Wright | Dem |

† - Incumbent not seeking re-election

| Party | Candi- dates | Votes | | Seats | | |
| Party | Candi- dates | No. | % | No. | +/– | % |
|---|---|---|---|---|---|---|
| Democratic | 95 | 1,722,045 | 47.77% | 62 | ▼4 | 50.83% |
| Republican | 95 | 1,826,548 | 50.75% | 58 | ▲5 | 49.17% |
| Libertarian | 17 | 41,880 | 1.16% | 0 | Steady | 0% |
| Reform | 4 | 11,829 | 0.32% | 0 | ▼1 | 0% |
| Independent | 1 | 2,937 | 0.08% | 0 | Steady | 0% |
| Total | 212 | 3,605,239 | 100.00% | 120 | Steady | 100.00% |

House seats
| Democratic | 50.83% |
| Republican | 49.17% |

Popular vote
| Republican | 50.747% |
| Democratic | 47.765% |
| Libertarian | 1.162% |
| Reform | 0.328% |
| Independent | 0.081% |

=== Incumbents defeated in primary election ===
- George Miller Jr. (D-District 23), defeated by Paul Miller (D)
- Steve Wood (R-District 27), defeated by John Blust (R) (Note: Wood ran in the general election on the Reform Party line)
- Jimmie Edward Ford (D-District 97), defeated by Larry Bell (D)

=== Incumbents defeated in general election ===
- O. Max Melton (D-District 34), defeated by Fern Shubert (R)
- Charlotte Gardner (R-District 35), defeated by Lorene Coates (D)
- Jim Horn (D-District 48), defeated by John Weatherly (R)
- John Bridgeman (D-District 76), defeated by Michael Harrington (R)
- Len Sossamon (D-District 90), defeated by Linda Johnson (R)

=== Open seats that changed parties ===
- Liston Ramsey (D-District 52) didn't seek re-election, seat won by Margaret Carpenter (R)

== Detailed Results ==
=== Districts 1-19 ===
==== District 1 ====
Incumbent Democrat Bill Owens has represented the 1st district since 1995.

North Carolina House of Representatives 1st district general election, 2000
| Party | Candidate | Votes | % |
|---|---|---|---|
| Democratic | Bill Owens (incumbent) | 15,475 | 100% |
| Total votes | | 15,475 | 100% |
| Democratic hold | | | |

==== District 2 ====
Incumbent Democrat Zeno Edwards has represented the 2nd district since 1993.

North Carolina House of Representatives 2nd district general election, 2000
| Party | Candidate | Votes | % |
|---|---|---|---|
| Democratic | Zeno Edwards (incumbent) | 12,843 | 54.85% |
| Republican | Stan Deatherage | 10,570 | 45.15% |
| Total votes | | 23,413 | 100% |
| Democratic hold | | | |

==== District 3 ====
Incumbent Democrat Scott Thomas has represented the 3rd district since 1999. He ran successfully for the North Carolina Senate. Democrat Alice Graham Underhill won the open seat, defeating former Representative John M. Nichols.

North Carolina House of Representatives 3rd district general election, 2000
| Party | Candidate | Votes | % |
|---|---|---|---|
| Democratic | Alice Graham Underhill | 10,329 | 46.18% |
| Republican | John M. Nichols | 9,099 | 40.68% |
| Independent | Bill Harper | 2,937 | 13.13% |
| Total votes | | 22,365 | 100% |
| Democratic hold | | | |

==== District 4 ====
Incumbent Republican Jean Preston has represented the 4th district since 1993. Incumbent Democrat Ronald Smith has represented the 4th district since 1997. Both were re-elected.

North Carolina House of Representatives 4th district general election, 2000
| Party | Candidate | Votes | % |
|---|---|---|---|
| Republican | Jean Preston (incumbent) | 22,752 | 39.75% |
| Democratic | Ronald Smith (incumbent) | 19,844 | 34.67% |
| Republican | Jonathan Robinson | 14,648 | 25.59% |
| Total votes | | 57,244 | 100% |
| Republican hold | | | |
| Democratic hold | | | |

==== District 5 ====
Incumbent Democrat Howard Hunter Jr. has represented the 5th district since 1989.

North Carolina House of Representatives 5th district general election, 2000
| Party | Candidate | Votes | % |
|---|---|---|---|
| Democratic | Howard Hunter Jr. (incumbent) | 16,341 | 100% |
| Total votes | | 16,341 | 100% |
| Democratic hold | | | |

==== District 6 ====
Incumbent Democrat Gene Rogers has represented the 6th district since 1987.

North Carolina House of Representatives 6th district general election, 2000
| Party | Candidate | Votes | % |
|---|---|---|---|
| Democratic | Gene Rogers (incumbent) | 12,985 | 63.82% |
| Republican | Edwin W. Congleton | 7,361 | 36.18% |
| Total votes | | 20,346 | 100% |
| Democratic hold | | | |

==== District 7 ====
Incumbent Democrat John Hall has represented the 7th district since his appointment on February 4, 2000. Hall was re-elected to a full term.

North Carolina House of Representatives 7th district general election, 2000
| Party | Candidate | Votes | % |
|---|---|---|---|
| Democratic | John Hall (incumbent) | 14,004 | 100% |
| Total votes | | 14,004 | 100% |
| Democratic hold | | | |

==== District 8 ====
Incumbent Democrat Edith Warren has represented the 8th district since 1999

North Carolina House of Representatives 8th district general election, 2000
| Party | Candidate | Votes | % |
|---|---|---|---|
| Democratic | Edith Warren (incumbent) | 13,051 | 100% |
| Total votes | | 13,051 | 100% |
| Democratic hold | | | |

==== District 9 ====
Incumbent Democrat Marian McLawhorn has represented the 9th district since 1999.

North Carolina House of Representatives 9th district general election, 2000
| Party | Candidate | Votes | % |
|---|---|---|---|
| Democratic | Marian McLawhorn (incumbent) | 14,167 | 54.81% |
| Republican | Wayne Holloman | 11,683 | 45.20% |
| Total votes | | 25,850 | 100% |
| Democratic hold | | | |

==== District 10 ====
Incumbent Democrat Russell Tucker has represented the 10th district since 1999.

North Carolina House of Representatives 10th district general election, 2000
| Party | Candidate | Votes | % |
|---|---|---|---|
| Democratic | Russell Tucker (incumbent) | 8,077 | 52.01% |
| Republican | Sherwood Fountain | 7,454 | 47.99% |
| Total votes | | 15,531 | 100% |
| Democratic hold | | | |

==== District 11 ====
Incumbent Democrat Phil Baddour has represented the 11th district since 1997 and previously from 1993 to 1995.

North Carolina House of Representatives 11th district general election, 2000
| Party | Candidate | Votes | % |
|---|---|---|---|
| Democratic | Phil Baddour (incumbent) | 11,834 | 59.67% |
| Republican | Willie Ray Starling | 7,774 | 39.20% |
| Libertarian | Mike Todaro | 226 | 1.14% |
| Total votes | | 19,834 | 100% |
| Democratic hold | | | |

==== District 12 ====
Incumbent Democrat Nurham Warwick has represented the 12th district since 1997.

North Carolina House of Representatives 12th district general election, 2000
| Party | Candidate | Votes | % |
|---|---|---|---|
| Democratic | Nurham Warwick (incumbent) | 12,574 | 54.88% |
| Republican | Ted Brown | 10,337 | 45.12% |
| Total votes | | 22,911 | 100% |
| Democratic hold | | | |

==== District 13 ====
Incumbent Republican Danny McComas has represented the 13th district since 1995.

North Carolina House of Representatives 13th district general election, 2000
| Party | Candidate | Votes | % |
|---|---|---|---|
| Republican | Danny McComas (incumbent) | 20,214 | 100% |
| Total votes | | 20,214 | 100% |
| Republican hold | | | |

==== District 14 ====
Incumbent Democrats David Redwine, who has represented the 14th district since 1985, and Dewey Hill, who has represented the 14th district since 1992, were re-elected.

North Carolina House of Representatives 14th district general election, 2000
| Party | Candidate | Votes | % |
|---|---|---|---|
| Democratic | David Redwine (incumbent) | 27,742 | 29.51% |
| Democratic | Dewey Hill (incumbent) | 25,763 | 27.41% |
| Republican | William A. "Bill" Caster | 22,791 | 24.25% |
| Republican | Robert "Bob" Quinn | 17,701 | 18.83% |
| Total votes | | 93,997 | 100% |
| Democratic hold | | | |
| Democratic hold | | | |

==== District 15 ====
Incumbent Republican Sam Ellis has represented the 15th district since 1993.

North Carolina House of Representatives 15th district general election, 2000
| Party | Candidate | Votes | % |
|---|---|---|---|
| Republican | Sam Ellis (incumbent) | 21,286 | 58.60% |
| Democratic | Thomas Hunt | 15,041 | 41.40% |
| Total votes | | 36,327 | 100% |
| Republican hold | | | |

==== District 16 ====
Incumbent Democrat Douglas Yongue has represented the 16th district since 1993.

North Carolina House of Representatives 16th district general election, 2000
| Party | Candidate | Votes | % |
|---|---|---|---|
| Democratic | Douglas Yongue (incumbent) | 11,871 | 64.24% |
| Republican | C. Linwood Faulk | 6,608 | 35.76% |
| Total votes | | 18,479 | 100% |
| Democratic hold | | | |

==== District 17 ====
Incumbent Democrat Mary McAllister, who has represented the 17th district since 1991, was re-elected. Incumbent Democrat Theodore James Kinney, who has represented the 17th district since 1993, retired. Democrat Marvin Lucas won the open seat.

North Carolina House of Representatives 17th district general election, 2000
| Party | Candidate | Votes | % |
|---|---|---|---|
| Democratic | Marvin Lucas | 12,520 | 42.05% |
| Democratic | Mary McAllister (incumbent) | 12,141 | 40.77% |
| Republican | George E. Boggs | 5,115 | 17.18% |
| Total votes | | 29,776 | 100% |
| Democratic hold | | | |
| Democratic hold | | | |

==== District 18 ====
Incumbent Democrat Bill Hurley, who has represented the 18th district since 1995, was re-elected here. Incumbent Republican Mia Morris, who has represented the 18th district since 1997, was also re-elected.

North Carolina House of Representatives 18th district general election, 2000
| Party | Candidate | Votes | % |
|---|---|---|---|
| Democratic | John W. "Bill" Hurley (incumbent) | 23,317 | 49.86% |
| Republican | Mia Morris (incumbent) | 20,472 | 43.78% |
| Libertarian | Christian G. Davis | 2,973 | 6.36% |
| Total votes | | 46,762 | 100% |
| Democratic hold | | | |
| Republican hold | | | |

==== District 19 ====
Incumbent Democrat Leslie Cox, who has represented the 19th district since 1999, was re-elected. Incumbent Republican Don Davis, who has represented the 19th district since 1995, was also re-elected.

North Carolina House of Representatives 19th district general election, 2000
| Party | Candidate | Votes | % |
|---|---|---|---|
| Democratic | Leslie Cox (incumbent) | 21,359 | 27.54% |
| Republican | Don Davis (incumbent) | 20,817 | 26.84% |
| Republican | Bobby Ray Hall | 18,077 | 23.31% |
| Democratic | Larry C. Upchurch | 17,310 | 22.32% |
| Total votes | | 77,563 | 100% |
| Democratic hold | | | |
| Republican hold | | | |

=== Districts 20-39 ===
==== District 20 ====
Incumbent Republican Billy Creech has represented the 20th district since 1989.

North Carolina House of Representatives 20th district general election, 2000
| Party | Candidate | Votes | % |
|---|---|---|---|
| Republican | Billy Creech (incumbent) | 17,023 | 60.40% |
| Democratic | Richard Price | 11,162 | 39.60% |
| Total votes | | 28,185 | 100% |
| Republican hold | | | |

==== District 21 ====
Incumbent Democrat Dan Blue has represented the 21st district since 1981.

North Carolina House of Representatives 21st district general election, 2000
| Party | Candidate | Votes | % |
|---|---|---|---|
| Democratic | Dan Blue (incumbent) | 20,097 | 91.48% |
| Libertarian | Jesse Halliday | 1,872 | 8.52% |
| Total votes | | 21,969 | 100% |
| Democratic hold | | | |

==== District 22 ====
Incumbent Democrats Jim Crawford, who has represented the 22nd district since 1995, and Gordon Allen, who has represented the 22nd district since 1997, were re-elected.

North Carolina House of Representatives 22nd district general election, 2000
| Party | Candidate | Votes | % |
|---|---|---|---|
| Democratic | Jim Crawford (incumbent) | 26,875 | 39.33% |
| Democratic | Gordon Allen (incumbent) | 24,148 | 35.34% |
| Republican | Audrey M. Smith | 15,340 | 22.45% |
| Libertarian | Tom Howe | 1,975 | 2.89% |
| Total votes | | 68,338 | 100% |
| Democratic hold | | | |
| Democratic hold | | | |

==== District 23 ====
Incumbent Democrats Paul Luebke, who has represented the 23rd district since 1991, and Mickey Michaux, who has represented the 23rd district since 1985, were re-elected. Incumbent Democrat George W. Miller Jr., who has represented the 23rd district and its predecessors since 1971, lost re-nomination to fellow Democrat Paul Miller, who also was elected in the general election.

North Carolina House of Representatives 23rd district general election, 2000
| Party | Candidate | Votes | % |
|---|---|---|---|
| Democratic | Paul Luebke (incumbent) | 57,471 | 33.70% |
| Democratic | Mickey Michaux (incumbent) | 51,329 | 30.10% |
| Democratic | Paul Miller | 44,521 | 26.11% |
| Libertarian | Robert Dorsey | 9,819 | 5.76% |
| Libertarian | Raymond Ubinger | 7,397 | 4.34% |
| Total votes | | 170,537 | 100% |
| Democratic hold | | | |
| Democratic hold | | | |
| Democratic hold | | | |

==== District 24 ====
Incumbent Democrats Joe Hackney, who has represented the 24th district and its predecessors since 1981, and Verla Insko, who has represented the 24th district since 1997, were re-elected.

North Carolina House of Representatives 24th district general election, 2000
| Party | Candidate | Votes | % |
|---|---|---|---|
| Democratic | Joe Hackney (incumbent) | 41,133 | 33.73% |
| Democratic | Verla Insko (incumbent) | 38,944 | 31.93% |
| Republican | William Towne | 19,928 | 16.34% |
| Republican | Rod Chaney | 19,281 | 15.81% |
| Libertarian | John H. Bauman | 2,672 | 2.19% |
| Total votes | | 121,958 | 100% |
| Democratic hold | | | |
| Democratic hold | | | |

==== District 25 ====
Incumbent Republicans Cary Allred, who has represented the 25th district since 1995, and W.B. Teague, who has represented the 25th district since 1999, were re-elected. Incumbent Democrat Nelson Cole, who has represented the 25th district since 1997, and previously from 1993 to 1995, was also re-elected.

North Carolina House of Representatives 25th district general election, 2000
| Party | Candidate | Votes | % |
|---|---|---|---|
| Republican | Cary Allred (incumbent) | 36,513 | 18.71% |
| Republican | W.B. Teague (incumbent) | 35,197 | 18.04% |
| Democratic | Nelson Cole (incumbent) | 34,228 | 17.54% |
| Republican | Bert Jones | 33,950 | 17.40% |
| Democratic | John M. Glenn | 32,271 | 16.54% |
| Democratic | Danny E. Davis | 23,001 | 11.79% |
| Total votes | | 195,160 | 100% |
| Republican hold | | | |
| Republican hold | | | |
| Democratic hold | | | |

==== District 26 ====
Incumbent Democrat Alma Adams has represented the 26th district since 1994.

North Carolina House of Representatives 26th district general election, 2000
| Party | Candidate | Votes | % |
|---|---|---|---|
| Democratic | Alma Adams (incumbent) | 14,677 | 73.75% |
| Republican | James A. "Jim" Rumley | 5,224 | 26.25% |
| Total votes | | 19,901 | 100% |
| Democratic hold | | | |

==== District 27 ====
Incumbent Republican Stephen Wood, who has represented the 27th district and its predecessors since 1985, ran for re-election but lost the Republican nomination to John Blust. Wood ran in the general election on the Reform Party line, but again lost to Blust.

North Carolina House of Representatives 27th district general election, 2000
| Party | Candidate | Votes | % |
|---|---|---|---|
| Republican | John Blust | 24,063 | 83.98% |
| Reform | Steve Wood (incumbent) | 4,589 | 16.02% |
| Total votes | | 28,652 | 100% |
| Republican gain from Reform | | | |

==== District 28 ====
Incumbent Democrat Flossie Body-McIntyre has represented the 28th district since 1995.

North Carolina House of Representatives 28th district general election, 2000
| Party | Candidate | Votes | % |
|---|---|---|---|
| Democratic | Flossie Boyd-McIntyre (incumbent) | 15,313 | 100% |
| Total votes | | 15,313 | 100% |
| Democratic hold | | | |

==== District 29 ====
Incumbent Republican Joanne Bowie has represented the 29th district since 1989.

North Carolina House of Representatives 29th district general election, 2000
| Party | Candidate | Votes | % |
|---|---|---|---|
| Republican | Joanne Bowie (incumbent) | 25,045 | 100% |
| Total votes | | 25,045 | 100% |
| Republican hold | | | |

==== District 30 ====
Incumbent Republican Arlie Culp has represented the 30th district since 1989.

North Carolina House of Representatives 30th district general election, 2000
| Party | Candidate | Votes | % |
|---|---|---|---|
| Republican | Arlie Culp (incumbent) | 13,978 | 62.13% |
| Democratic | Matilda Phillips | 8,040 | 35.74% |
| Libertarian | Victoria D. Prevo | 479 | 2.13% |
| Total votes | | 22,497 | 100% |
| Republican hold | | | |

==== District 31 ====
Incumbent Republican Richard Morgan has represented the 31st district since 1991.

North Carolina House of Representatives 31st district general election, 2000
| Party | Candidate | Votes | % |
|---|---|---|---|
| Republican | Richard Morgan (incumbent) | 16,525 | 54.84% |
| Democratic | Ellen Vann Crews | 13,608 | 45.16% |
| Total votes | | 30,133 | 100% |
| Republican hold | | | |

==== District 32 ====
Incumbent Democrat Wayne Goodwin has represented the 32nd district since 1997.

North Carolina House of Representatives 32nd district general election, 2000
| Party | Candidate | Votes | % |
|---|---|---|---|
| Democratic | Wayne Goodwin (incumbent) | 13,417 | 100% |
| Total votes | | 13,417 | 100% |
| Democratic hold | | | |

==== District 33 ====
Incumbent Democrat Pryor Gibson has represented the 33rd district since 1999.

North Carolina House of Representatives 33rd district general election, 2000
| Party | Candidate | Votes | % |
|---|---|---|---|
| Democratic | Pryor Gibson (incumbent) | 14,621 | 100% |
| Total votes | | 14,621 | 100% |
| Democratic hold | | | |

==== District 34 ====
Incumbent Democrat O. Max Melton has represented the 34th district since 1999. In a rematch of the 1998 election, Republican Fern Shubert defeated Melton to win back her old seat.

North Carolina House of Representatives 34th district general election, 2000
| Party | Candidate | Votes | % |
|---|---|---|---|
| Republican | Fern Shubert | 13,117 | 53.71% |
| Democratic | O. Max Melton (incumbent) | 11,306 | 46.29% |
| Total votes | | 24,423 | 100% |
| Republican gain from Democratic | | | |

==== District 35 ====
Incumbent Republican Charlotte Gardner has represented the 35th district since 1985. Gardner lost re-election to Democrat Lorene Coates

North Carolina House of Representatives 35th district general election, 2000
| Party | Candidate | Votes | % |
|---|---|---|---|
| Democratic | Lorene Coates | 11,026 | 52.04% |
| Republican | Charlotte Gardner (incumbent) | 10,163 | 47.96% |
| Total votes | | 21,189 | 100% |
| Democratic gain from Republican | | | |

==== District 36 ====
Incumbent Democrat Speaker of The House Jim Black has represented the 36th district since 1991.

North Carolina House of Representatives 36th district general election, 2000
| Party | Candidate | Votes | % |
|---|---|---|---|
| Democratic | Jim Black (incumbent) | 13,020 | 64.14% |
| Republican | Cheryl Jones | 7,280 | 35.86% |
| Total votes | | 20,300 | 100% |
| Democratic hold | | | |

==== District 37 ====
Incumbent Democrat Paul Reeves McCrary has represented the 37th district since 1993. McCrary didn't seek re-election and fellow Democrat Hugh Holliman won the open seat.

North Carolina House of Representatives 37th district general election, 2000
| Party | Candidate | Votes | % |
|---|---|---|---|
| Democratic | Hugh Holliman | 10,676 | 56.80% |
| Republican | Cindy Akins | 7,783 | 41.41% |
| Libertarian | Paul Burks | 336 | 1.79% |
| Total votes | | 18,795 | 100% |
| Democratic hold | | | |

==== District 38 ====
Incumbent Republican Harold Brubaker has represented the 38th district and its predecessors since 1977.

North Carolina House of Representatives 38th district general election, 2000
| Party | Candidate | Votes | % |
|---|---|---|---|
| Republican | Harold Brubaker (incumbent) | 17,781 | 69.61% |
| Democratic | Tommy Lawrence | 7,763 | 30.39% |
| Total votes | | 25,544 | 100% |
| Republican hold | | | |

==== District 39 ====
Incumbent Republican Lyons Gray has represented the 39th district since 1989.

North Carolina House of Representatives 39th district general election, 2000
| Party | Candidate | Votes | % |
|---|---|---|---|
| Republican | Lyons Gray (incumbent) | 21,263 | 100% |
| Total votes | | 21,263 | 100% |
| Republican hold | | | |

=== Districts 40-59 ===
==== District 40 ====
Incumbent Republicans William Hiatt, Gene Wilson, and Rex Baker have all represented the 40th district since 1995.

North Carolina House of Representatives 40th district general election, 2000
| Party | Candidate | Votes | % |
|---|---|---|---|
| Republican | William Hiatt (incumbent) | 44,155 | 23.90% |
| Republican | Gene Wilson (incumbent) | 42,337 | 22.92% |
| Republican | Rex Baker (incumbent) | 42,110 | 22.79% |
| Democratic | Bert Wood | 30,224 | 16.36% |
| Democratic | Daniel Hense | 25,915 | 14.03% |
| Total votes | | 184,741 | 100% |
| Republican hold | | | |
| Republican hold | | | |
| Republican hold | | | |

==== District 41 ====
Incumbent Republican George Holmes, who has represented the 41st district and its predecessors since 1979, was re-elected. incumbent Republican John Walter Brown, who had represented the 41st district since 1979, retired. Republican Tracy Walker won the open seat.

North Carolina House of Representatives 41st district general election, 2000
| Party | Candidate | Votes | % |
|---|---|---|---|
| Republican | Tracy Walker | 34,478 | 51.23% |
| Republican | George Holmes (incumbent) | 32,829 | 48.78% |
| Total votes | | 67,307 | 100% |
| Republican hold | | | |
| Republican hold | | | |

==== District 42 ====
Incumbent Republican Frank Mitchell has represented the 42nd district since 1993. He defeated former representative John Wayne Kahl in the general election.

North Carolina House of Representatives 42nd district general election, 2000
| Party | Candidate | Votes | % |
|---|---|---|---|
| Republican | Frank Mitchell (incumbent) | 14,158 | 62.70% |
| Democratic | John Wayne Kahl | 8,421 | 37.30% |
| Total votes | | 22,579 | 100% |
| Republican hold | | | |

==== District 43 ====
Incumbent Republican Mitchell Setzer has represented the 43rd district since 1999.

North Carolina House of Representatives 43rd district general election, 2000
| Party | Candidate | Votes | % |
|---|---|---|---|
| Republican | Mitchell Setzer (incumbent) | 23,886 | 100% |
| Total votes | | 23,886 | 100% |
| Republican hold | | | |

==== District 44 ====
Incumbent Democrat Daniel Barefoot has represented the 44th district since 1999.

North Carolina House of Representatives 44th district general election, 2000
| Party | Candidate | Votes | % |
|---|---|---|---|
| Democratic | Daniel Barefoot (incumbent) | 10,425 | 62.15% |
| Republican | Tom Rogers | 6,348 | 37.85% |
| Total votes | | 16,773 | 100% |
| Democratic hold | | | |

==== District 45 ====
Incumbent Republican Joe Kiser, who has represented the 45th district since 1995, was re-elected. Incumbent Republican Cherie Berry, who has represented the 45th district since 1993, retired to run for Labor Commissioner. Republican Mark Hilton won the open seat.

North Carolina House of Representatives 45th district general election, 2000
| Party | Candidate | Votes | % |
|---|---|---|---|
| Republican | Joe Kiser (incumbent) | 30,639 | 32.75% |
| Republican | Mark Hilton | 29,812 | 31.87% |
| Democratic | David Clark Jr. | 19,419 | 20.76% |
| Democratic | Columbus J. Turner | 13,679 | 14.62% |
| Total votes | | 93,549 | 100% |
| Republican hold | | | |
| Republican hold | | | |

==== District 46 ====
Incumbent Republican Charles Buchanan, who has represented the 46th district since 1985 (with the exception of 1993–1995), was re-elected. Incumbent Republican Gregg Thompson, who has represented the 46th district since 1993, was also re-elected.

North Carolina House of Representatives 46th district general election, 2000
| Party | Candidate | Votes | % |
|---|---|---|---|
| Republican | Charles Buchanan (incumbent) | 28,274 | 40.33% |
| Republican | Gregg Thompson (incumbent) | 26,573 | 37.90% |
| Democratic | Joe Delk | 15,267 | 21.78% |
| Total votes | | 7,011 | 100% |
| Republican hold | | | |
| Republican hold | | | |

==== District 47 ====
Incumbent Democrat Walt Church has represented the 47th district since 1993.

North Carolina House of Representatives 47th district general election, 2000
| Party | Candidate | Votes | % |
|---|---|---|---|
| Democratic | Walt Church (incumbent) | 12,102 | 58.55% |
| Republican | Earl A. Cook | 8,567 | 41.45% |
| Total votes | | 20,669 | 100% |
| Democratic hold | | | |

==== District 48 ====
Incumbent Republican Debbie Clary, who has represented the 48th district since 1995, was re-elected. Incumbent Democrat Andy Dedmon, who has represented the 48th district since 1997, was also re-elected. Incumbent Democrat Jim Horn, who has represented the 48th district since 1999, lost re-election to Republican John Weatherly. Weatherly had previously held the seat from 1993 to 1999.

North Carolina House of Representatives 48th district general election, 2000
| Party | Candidate | Votes | % |
|---|---|---|---|
| Republican | Debbie Clary (incumbent) | 35,545 | 19.71% |
| Democratic | Andy Dedmon (incumbent) | 32,641 | 18.10% |
| Republican | John Weatherly | 31,200 | 17.30% |
| Democratic | Jim Horn (incumbent) | 28,952 | 16.06% |
| Republican | Dennis H. Davis | 27,563 | 15.29% |
| Democratic | Connie Goforth-Greene | 24,420 | 13.54% |
| Total votes | | 180,321 | 100% |
| Republican hold | | | |
| Democratic hold | | | |
| Republican gain from Democratic | | | |

==== District 49 ====
Incumbent Republican Mitch Gillespie has represented the 49th district since 1999.

North Carolina House of Representatives 49th district general election, 2000
| Party | Candidate | Votes | % |
|---|---|---|---|
| Republican | Mitch Gillespie (incumbent) | 14,174 | 60.34% |
| Democratic | David Huskins | 9,315 | 39.66% |
| Total votes | | 23,489 | 100% |
| Republican hold | | | |

==== District 50 ====
Incumbent Republican Larry Justus has represented the 50th district since 1985.

North Carolina House of Representatives 50th district general election, 2000
| Party | Candidate | Votes | % |
|---|---|---|---|
| Republican | Larry Justus (incumbent) | 24,716 | 100% |
| Total votes | | 24,716 | 100% |
| Republican hold | | | |

==== District 51 ====
Incumbent Republicans Wilma Sherrill and Lanier Cansler, who have both represented the 51st district since 1995, were re-elected. Incumbent Democrat Martin Nesbitt, who has represented the 51st district since 1979 (with the exception of from 1995 to 1997), was also re-elected.

North Carolina House of Representatives 51st district general election, 2000
| Party | Candidate | Votes | % |
|---|---|---|---|
| Republican | Wilma Sherrill (incumbent) | 41,402 | 19.18% |
| Democratic | Martin Nesbitt (incumbent) | 38,594 | 17.88% |
| Republican | Lanier Cansler (incumbent) | 38,041 | 17.63% |
| Democratic | Barbara Field | 32,224 | 14.93% |
| Democratic | J. Ray Elingburg | 29,951 | 13.88% |
| Republican | Betty B. Williams | 28,384 | 13.15% |
| Reform | Kristina Michele Murphy | 3,593 | 1.67% |
| Reform | Lance Kurland | 1,836 | 0.85% |
| Reform | Jerold F. Johnson | 1,811 | 0.84% |
| Total votes | | 215,836 | 100% |
| Republican hold | | | |
| Democratic hold | | | |
| Republican hold | | | |

==== District 52 ====
Incumbent Democrat Phil Haire, who has represented the 52nd district since 1999, was re-elected. Incumbent Democrat Liston Ramsey, who has represented the 52nd district and its predecessors since 1961 (with the exception of 1965–1967), retired. Republican Margaret Carpenter won the open seat.

North Carolina House of Representatives 52nd district general election, 2000
| Party | Candidate | Votes | % |
|---|---|---|---|
| Democratic | Phil Haire (incumbent) | 24,983 | 27.50% |
| Republican | Margaret Carpenter | 23,485 | 25.85% |
| Democratic | Mary Ann Enloe | 23,381 | 25.74% |
| Republican | Jesse Sigmon | 18,998 | 20.91% |
| Total votes | | 90,847 | 100% |
| Democratic hold | | | |
| Republican gain from Democratic | | | |

==== District 53 ====
Incumbent Republican Roger West has represented the 53rd district since his appointment on May 5, 2000. He was re-elected to a full term.

North Carolina House of Representatives 53rd district general election, 2000
| Party | Candidate | Votes | % |
|---|---|---|---|
| Republican | Roger West (incumbent) | 16,842 | 60.77% |
| Democratic | W.C. "Sonny" Burrell | 10,873 | 39.23% |
| Total votes | | 27,715 | 100% |
| Republican hold | | | |

==== District 54 ====
Incumbent Democrat Drew Saunders has represented the 54th district since 1997.

North Carolina House of Representatives 54th district general election, 2000
| Party | Candidate | Votes | % |
|---|---|---|---|
| Democratic | Drew Saunders (incumbent) | 20,097 | 55.19% |
| Republican | Wes Southern | 16,319 | 44.81% |
| Total votes | | 36,416 | 100% |
| Democratic hold | | | |

==== District 55 ====
Incumbent Republican Ed McMahan has represented the 55th district since 1995.

North Carolina House of Representatives 55th district general election, 2000
| Party | Candidate | Votes | % |
|---|---|---|---|
| Republican | Ed McMahan (incumbent) | 17,422 | 100% |
| Total votes | | 17,422 | 100% |
| Republican hold | | | |

==== District 56 ====
Incumbent Democrat Martha Alexander has represented the 56th district since 1993.

North Carolina House of Representatives 56th district general election, 2000
| Party | Candidate | Votes | % |
|---|---|---|---|
| Democratic | Martha Alexander (incumbent) | 13,864 | 100% |
| Total votes | | 13,864 | 100% |
| Democratic hold | | | |

==== District 57 ====
Incumbent Republican Connie Wilson has represented the 57th distort since 1993.

North Carolina House of Representatives 57th district general election, 2000
| Party | Candidate | Votes | % |
|---|---|---|---|
| Republican | Connie Wilson (incumbent) | 23,278 | 100% |
| Total votes | | 23,278 | 100% |
| Republican hold | | | |

==== District 58 ====
Incumbent Democrat Ruth Easterling has represented the 58th district and its predecessors since 1977.

North Carolina House of Representatives 58th district general election, 2000
| Party | Candidate | Votes | % |
|---|---|---|---|
| Democratic | Ruth Easterling (incumbent) | 14,167 | 100% |
| Total votes | | 14,167 | 100% |
| Democratic hold | | | |

==== District 59 ====
Incumbent Democrat Pete Cunningham has represented the 59th district since 1987.

North Carolina House of Representatives 59th district general election, 2000
| Party | Candidate | Votes | % |
|---|---|---|---|
| Democratic | Pete Cunningham (incumbent) | 13,658 | 100% |
| Total votes | | 13,658 | 100% |
| Democratic hold | | | |

=== Districts 60-79 ===
==== District 60 ====
Incumbent Democrat Beverly Earle has represented the 60th district since 1995.

North Carolina House of Representatives 60th district general election, 2000
| Party | Candidate | Votes | % |
|---|---|---|---|
| Democratic | Beverly Earle (incumbent) | 16,332 | 56.93% |
| Republican | Barbara Underwood | 12,355 | 43.07% |
| Total votes | | 28,687 | 100% |
| Democratic hold | | | |

==== District 61 ====
Incumbent Republican Art Pope has represented the 61st district since his appointment on April 13, 1999.

North Carolina House of Representatives 61st district general election, 2000
| Party | Candidate | Votes | % |
|---|---|---|---|
| Republican | Art Pope (incumbent) | 14,810 | 50.98% |
| Democratic | Jack Nichols | 14,243 | 49.02% |
| Total votes | | 29,053 | 100% |
| Republican hold | | | |

==== District 62 ====
Incumbent Republican David Miner has represented the 62nd district since 1993.

North Carolina House of Representatives 62nd district general election, 2000
| Party | Candidate | Votes | % |
|---|---|---|---|
| Republican | David Miner (incumbent) | 29,854 | 59.37% |
| Democratic | Gerald W. Holleman | 18,855 | 37.50% |
| Libertarian | Ian M. Sands | 1,573 | 3.13% |
| Total votes | | 50,282 | 100% |
| Republican hold | | | |

==== District 63 ====
Incumbent Democrat Jennifer Weiss has represented the 63rd district since her appointment on November 29, 1999. Weiss was re-elected to a full term.

North Carolina House of Representatives 63rd district general election, 2000
| Party | Candidate | Votes | % |
|---|---|---|---|
| Democratic | Jennifer Weiss (incumbent) | 16,742 | 54.99% |
| Republican | Nancy H. Brown | 13,705 | 45.01% |
| Total votes | | 30,447 | 100% |
| Democratic hold | | | |

==== District 64 ====
incumbent Democrat Bob Hensley has represented the 64th district since 1991.

North Carolina House of Representatives 64th district general election, 2000
| Party | Candidate | Votes | % |
|---|---|---|---|
| Democratic | Bob Hensley (incumbent) | 15,140 | 60.72% |
| Republican | Charles L. Moorefield Jr. | 9,152 | 36.71% |
| Libertarian | Thomas A. Luther | 641 | 2.57% |
| Total votes | | 24,933 | 100% |
| Democratic hold | | | |

==== District 65 ====
Incumbent Republican Rick Eddins has represented the 65th district since 1995.

North Carolina House of Representatives 65th district general election, 2000
| Party | Candidate | Votes | % |
|---|---|---|---|
| Republican | Rick Eddins (incumbent) | 23,416 | 100% |
| Total votes | | 23,416 | 100% |
| Republican hold | | | |

==== District 66 ====
Incumbent Democrat Larry Womble has represented the 66th district since 1995.

North Carolina House of Representatives 66th district general election, 2000
| Party | Candidate | Votes | % |
|---|---|---|---|
| Democratic | Larry Womble (incumbent) | 12,293 | 85.08% |
| Libertarian | Donald J. Biles | 2,155 | 14.92% |
| Total votes | | 14,448 | 100% |
| Democratic hold | | | |

==== District 67 ====
Incumbent Democrat Warren Oldham has represented the 67th district since 1991.

North Carolina House of Representatives 67th district general election, 2000
| Party | Candidate | Votes | % |
|---|---|---|---|
| Democratic | Warren Oldham (incumbent) | 13,807 | 100% |
| Total votes | | 13,807 | 100% |
| Democratic hold | | | |

==== District 68 ====
Incumbent Republican Trudi Walend has represented the 68th district since 1999.

North Carolina House of Representatives 68th district general election, 2000
| Party | Candidate | Votes | % |
|---|---|---|---|
| Republican | Trudi Walend (incumbent) | 21,456 | 100% |
| Total votes | | 21,456 | 100% |
| Republican hold | | | |

==== District 69 ====
Incumbent Republican Jim Gulley has represented the 69th district since 1997.

North Carolina House of Representatives 69th district general election, 2000
| Party | Candidate | Votes | % |
|---|---|---|---|
| Republican | Jim Gulley (incumbent) | 26,404 | 90.79% |
| Libertarian | Dave Gable | 2,678 | 9.21% |
| Total votes | | 29,082 | 100% |
| Republican hold | | | |

==== District 70 ====
Incumbent Democrat Toby Fitch has represented the 70th district since 1985.

North Carolina House of Representatives 70th district general election, 2000
| Party | Candidate | Votes | % |
|---|---|---|---|
| Democratic | Toby Fitch (incumbent) | 13,033 | 100% |
| Total votes | | 13,033 | 100% |
| Democratic hold | | | |

==== District 71 ====
Incumbent Democrat Joe Tolson has represented the 71st district since 1997.

North Carolina House of Representatives 71st district general election, 2000
| Party | Candidate | Votes | % |
|---|---|---|---|
| Democratic | Joe Tolson (incumbent) | 12,915 | 63.30% |
| Republican | Wade Ellison | 7,489 | 36.70% |
| Total votes | | 20,404 | 100% |
| Democratic hold | | | |

==== District 72 ====
Incumbent Republican Gene Arnold has represented the 72nd district since 1993.

North Carolina House of Representatives 72nd district general election, 2000
| Party | Candidate | Votes | % |
|---|---|---|---|
| Republican | Gene Arnold (incumbent) | 14,332 | 57.19% |
| Democratic | Mary Alice Wells | 10,728 | 42.81% |
| Total votes | | 25,060 | 100% |
| Republican hold | | | |

==== District 73 ====
Incumbent Republican Wayne Sexton has represented the 73rd district since 1993.

North Carolina House of Representatives 73rd district general election, 2000
| Party | Candidate | Votes | % |
|---|---|---|---|
| Republican | Wayne Sexton (incumbent) | 14,100 | 66.60% |
| Democratic | Michael Adamson | 7,072 | 33.40% |
| Total votes | | 21,172 | 100% |
| Republican hold | | | |

==== District 74 ====
Incumbent Republican Julia Craven Howard has represented the 74th district and its predecessors since 1989.

North Carolina House of Representatives 74th district general election, 2000
| Party | Candidate | Votes | % |
|---|---|---|---|
| Republican | Julia Craven Howard (incumbent) | 22,773 | 100% |
| Total votes | | 22,773 | 100% |
| Republican hold | | | |

==== District 75 ====
Incumbent Democrat Alex Warner has represented the 75th district since 1987.

North Carolina House of Representatives 75th district general election, 2000
| Party | Candidate | Votes | % |
|---|---|---|---|
| Democratic | Alex Warner (incumbent) | 11,228 | 60.54% |
| Republican | James F. Mabe | 7,318 | 39.46% |
| Total votes | | 18,546 | 100% |
| Democratic hold | | | |

==== District 76 ====
Incumbent Democrat John Bridgeman has represented the 76th district since 1999. He lost re-election to Republican Michael Harrington.

North Carolina House of Representatives 76th district general election, 2000
| Party | Candidate | Votes | % |
|---|---|---|---|
| Republican | Michael Harrington | 15,430 | 55.79% |
| Democratic | John Bridgeman (incumbent) | 12,230 | 44.22% |
| Total votes | | 27,660 | 100% |
| Republican gain from Democratic | | | |

==== District 77 ====
Incumbent Republican Carolyn Russell has represented the 77th district since 1991.

North Carolina House of Representatives 77th district general election, 2000
| Party | Candidate | Votes | % |
|---|---|---|---|
| Republican | Carolyn Russell (incumbent) | 17,538 | 100% |
| Total votes | | 17,538 | 100% |
| Republican hold | | | |

==== District 78 ====
Incumbent Democrat Stanley Fox has represented the 78th district since 1995.

North Carolina House of Representatives 78th district general election, 2000
| Party | Candidate | Votes | % |
|---|---|---|---|
| Democratic | Stanley Fox (incumbent) | 16,287 | 100% |
| Total votes | | 16,287 | 100% |
| Democratic hold | | | |

==== District 79 ====
Incumbent Democrat William Wainwright has represented the 79th district and its predecessors since 1991.

North Carolina House of Representatives 79th district general election, 2000
| Party | Candidate | Votes | % |
|---|---|---|---|
| Democratic | William Wainwright (incumbent) | 14,665 | 100% |
| Total votes | | 14,665 | 100% |
| Democratic hold | | | |

=== Districts 80-98 ===
==== District 80 ====
Incumbent Republican Robert Grady has represented the 80th district and its predecessors since 1987.

North Carolina House of Representatives 80th district general election, 2000
| Party | Candidate | Votes | % |
|---|---|---|---|
| Republican | Robert Grady (incumbent) | 6,732 | 62.40% |
| Democratic | Charles Wiggins | 4,057 | 37.60% |
| Total votes | | 10,789 | 100% |
| Republican hold | | | |

==== District 81 ====
Incumbent Republican Tim Tallent has represented the 81st district and its predecessors since 1985. Tallent retired and fellow Republican Jeff Barnhart won the open seat.

North Carolina House of Representatives 81st district general election, 2000
| Party | Candidate | Votes | % |
|---|---|---|---|
| Republican | Jeff Barnhart | 23,157 | 62.83% |
| Democratic | Hector H. Henry II | 13,697 | 37.17% |
| Total votes | | 36,854 | 100% |
| Republican hold | | | |

==== District 82 ====
Incumbent Republican Bobby Barbee has represented the 82nd district and its predecessors since 1987.

North Carolina House of Representatives 82nd district general election, 2000
| Party | Candidate | Votes | % |
|---|---|---|---|
| Republican | Bobby Barbee (incumbent) | 19,092 | 100% |
| Total votes | | 19,092 | 100% |
| Republican hold | | | |

==== District 83 ====
Incumbent Republican Eugene McCombs has represented the 83rd district since 1993.

North Carolina House of Representatives 83rd district general election, 2000
| Party | Candidate | Votes | % |
|---|---|---|---|
| Republican | Eugene McCombs (incumbent) | 19,419 | 100% |
| Total votes | | 19,419 | 100% |
| Republican hold | | | |

==== District 84 ====
Incumbent Republican Michael Decker has represented the 84th district since 1985.

North Carolina House of Representatives 84th district general election, 2000
| Party | Candidate | Votes | % |
|---|---|---|---|
| Republican | Michael Decker (incumbent) | 18,708 | 65.00% |
| Democratic | Joseph M. Coltrane, Jr. | 10,074 | 35.00% |
| Total votes | | 28,782 | 100% |
| Republican hold | | | |

==== District 85 ====
Incumbent Democrat Ronnie Sutton has represented the 85th district since 1993.

North Carolina House of Representatives 85th district general election, 2000
| Party | Candidate | Votes | % |
|---|---|---|---|
| Democratic | Ronnie Sutton (incumbent) | 12,927 | 100% |
| Total votes | | 12,927 | 100% |
| Democratic hold | | | |

==== District 86 ====
Incumbent Democrat Bill Culpepper has represented the 86th district since 1993.

North Carolina House of Representatives 86th district general election, 2000
| Party | Candidate | Votes | % |
|---|---|---|---|
| Democratic | Bill Culpepper (incumbent) | 14,527 | 58.62% |
| Republican | Cheryl Boyd | 10,255 | 41.38% |
| Total votes | | 24,782 | 100% |
| Democratic hold | | | |

==== District 87 ====
Incumbent Democrat Donald Bonner has represented the 87th district since 1997.

North Carolina House of Representatives 87th district general election, 2000
| Party | Candidate | Votes | % |
|---|---|---|---|
| Democratic | Donald Bonner (incumbent) | 12,755 | 100% |
| Total votes | | 12,755 | 100% |
| Democratic hold | | | |

==== District 88 ====
Incumbent Republican Theresa Esposito has represented the 88th district and its predecessors since 1985.

North Carolina House of Representatives 88th district general election, 2000
| Party | Candidate | Votes | % |
|---|---|---|---|
| Republican | Theresa Esposito (incumbent) | 19,041 | 100% |
| Total votes | | 19,041 | 100% |
| Republican hold | | | |

==== District 89 ====
Incumbent Democrats Mary Jarrell and Maggie Jeffus have both represented the 80th district and its predecessors since 1991, with the exception of 1995–1997. Both were re-elected.

North Carolina House of Representatives 89th district general election, 2000
| Party | Candidate | Votes | % |
|---|---|---|---|
| Democratic | Mary Jarrell (incumbent) | 25,799 | 30.29% |
| Democratic | Maggie Jeffus (incumbent) | 24,246 | 28.46% |
| Republican | Joanne Sharpe | 17,187 | 20.18% |
| Republican | Dottie Salerno | 16,307 | 19.14% |
| Libertarian | Thomas A. "Tom" Bailey | 1,642 | 1.93% |
| Total votes | | 85,181 | 100% |
| Democratic hold | | | |
| Democratic hold | | | |

==== District 90 ====
Incumbent Democrat Len Sossamon has represented the 90th district since his appointment on May 17, 2000. Sossamon ran for re-election to a full term but was defeated by Republican Linda Johnson.

North Carolina House of Representatives 90th district general election, 2000
| Party | Candidate | Votes | % |
|---|---|---|---|
| Republican | Linda Johnson | 13,988 | 53.77% |
| Democratic | Len Sossamon (incumbent) | 12,025 | 46.23% |
| Total votes | | 26,013 | 100% |
| Republican gain from Democratic | | | |

==== District 91 ====
Incumbent Republican Edgar Starnes has represented the 91st district since 1997.

North Carolina House of Representatives 91st district general election, 2000
| Party | Candidate | Votes | % |
|---|---|---|---|
| Republican | Edgar Starnes (incumbent) | 15,050 | 85.98% |
| Libertarian | Joe Young | 2,454 | 14.02% |
| Total votes | | 17,504 | 100% |
| Republican hold | | | |

==== District 92 ====
Incumbent Republican Russell Capps has represented the 92nd district since 1993.

North Carolina House of Representatives 92nd district general election, 2000
| Party | Candidate | Votes | % |
|---|---|---|---|
| Republican | Russell Capps (incumbent) | 22,465 | 57.20% |
| Democratic | Dorothy Bowles | 16,807 | 42.80% |
| Total votes | | 39,272 | 100% |
| Republican hold | | | |

==== District 93 ====
Incumbent Republican John Rayfield has represented the 93rd district since 1995.

North Carolina House of Representatives 93rd district general election, 2000
| Party | Candidate | Votes | % |
|---|---|---|---|
| Republican | John Rayfield (incumbent) | 13,203 | 89.83% |
| Libertarian | Thomas Bishko | 1,495 | 10.17% |
| Total votes | | 14,698 | 100% |
| Republican hold | | | |

==== District 94 ====
Incumbent Republican Jerry Dockham has represented the 94th district and its predecessors since 1991.

North Carolina House of Representatives 94th district general election, 2000
| Party | Candidate | Votes | % |
|---|---|---|---|
| Republican | Jerry Dockham (incumbent) | 15,369 | 88.94% |
| Libertarian | Ken Younts | 1,912 | 11.06% |
| Total votes | | 17,281 | 100% |
| Republican hold | | | |

==== District 95 ====
Incumbent Republican Minority leader Leo Daughtry has represented the 95th district since 1993.

North Carolina House of Representatives 95th district general election, 2000
| Party | Candidate | Votes | % |
|---|---|---|---|
| Republican | Leo Daughtry (incumbent) | 15,511 | 60.87% |
| Democratic | Jim Johnson | 9,972 | 39.13% |
| Total votes | | 25,483 | 100% |
| Republican hold | | | |

==== District 96 ====
Incumbent Democrat Edd Nye has represented the 96th district and its predecessors since 1985.

North Carolina House of Representatives 96th district general election, 2000
| Party | Candidate | Votes | % |
|---|---|---|---|
| Democratic | Edd Nye (incumbent) | 14,599 | 53.39% |
| Republican | Al Freimark | 12,743 | 46.61% |
| Total votes | | 27,342 | 100% |
| Democratic hold | | | |

==== District 97 ====
Incumbent Democrat Jimmie Edward Ford has represented the 97th district since his appointment on March 21, 2000. Ford ran for re-election but lost re-nomination to Larry Bell. Bell won the general election.

North Carolina House of Representatives 97th district general election, 2000
| Party | Candidate | Votes | % |
|---|---|---|---|
| Democratic | Larry Bell | 9,131 | 72.63% |
| Republican | John Sherman Best | 3,441 | 27.37% |
| Total votes | | 12,572 | 100% |
| Democratic hold | | | |

==== District 98 ====
Incumbent Democrat Thomas Wright has represented the 98th district since 1993.

North Carolina House of Representatives 98th district general election, 2000
| Party | Candidate | Votes | % |
|---|---|---|---|
| Democratic | Thomas Wright (incumbent) | 16,058 | 100% |
| Total votes | | 16,058 | 100% |
| Democratic hold | | | |

== See also ==
- List of North Carolina state legislatures
