= North Carolina's 59th House district =

American legislative district

North Carolina's 59th State House of Representatives district
Representative
Alan Branson; R–Julian
- Demographics: 61% White; 24% Black; 7% Hispanic; 3% Asian; 5% Multiracial
- Population (2024): 93,332

North Carolina's 59th House district is one of 120 districts in the North Carolina House of Representatives. The district is currently represented by Republican Alan Branson, who was appointed following the resignation of Jon Hardister.

== Geography ==
Since 2003, the district has included part of Guilford County. The district overlaps with the 26th, 27th, and 28th Senate districts.

== District officeholders ==
Representative	Party	Dates	Notes	Counties
District created January 1, 1985.
James Franklin Richardson (Charlotte)	Democratic	January 1, 1985 – January 1, 1987	Retired to run for State Senate.	1985–2003; Part of Mecklenburg County.
Pete Cunningham (Charlotte)	Democratic	January 1, 1987 – January 1, 2003	Redistricted to the 107th district.	1985–2003; Part of Mecklenburg County.
Maggie Jeffus (Greensboro)	Democratic	January 1, 2003 – January 1, 2013	Redistricted from the 89th district. Redistricted to the 57th district and retired.	2003–Present; Parts of Guilford County.
Jon Hardister (Whitsett)	Republican	January 1, 2013 – April 8, 2024	Retired to run for Labor Commissioner. Resigned.	2003–Present; Parts of Guilford County.
Vacant		April 8, 2024 – April 16, 2024		2003–Present; Parts of Guilford County.
Alan Branson (Julian)	Republican	April 16, 2024 – Present	Appointed to finish Hardister's term.	2003–Present; Parts of Guilford County.

== Election results ==
=== 2026 ===
North Carolina House of Representatives 59th district Democratic primary election, 2026
Party	Candidate	Votes	%
Democratic	Elma Hairston	4,649	59.26%
Democratic	C. Bradley Hunt II	3,196	40.74%
Total votes		7,845	100%

North Carolina House of Representatives 59th district general election, 2026
Party	Candidate	Votes	%
Republican	Alan Branson (incumbent)		
Democratic	Elma Hairston		
Total votes			100%

=== 2024 ===
North Carolina House of Representatives 59th district Republican primary election, 2024
Party	Candidate	Votes	%
Republican	Alan Branson	7,245	70.39%
Republican	Allen Chappell	3,047	29.61%
Total votes		10,292	100%

North Carolina House of Representatives 59th district general election, 2024
Party	Candidate	Votes	%
Republican	Alan Branson (incumbent)	30,609	55.18%
Democratic	Tanneshia Dukes	24,859	44.82%
Total votes		55,468	100%
Republican hold			

=== 2022 ===
North Carolina House of Representatives 59th district Democratic primary election, 2022
Party	Candidate	Votes	%
Democratic	Sherrie Young	4,478	74.35%
Democratic	Eddie Aday	1,545	25.65%
Total votes		6,023	100%

North Carolina House of Representatives 59th district general election, 2022
Party	Candidate	Votes	%
Republican	Jon Hardister (incumbent)	19,558	56.33%
Democratic	Sherrie Young	15,163	43.67%
Total votes		34,721	100%
Republican hold			

=== 2020 ===
North Carolina House of Representatives 59th district Republican primary election, 2020
Party	Candidate	Votes	%
Republican	Jon Hardister (incumbent)	5,644	79.88%
Republican	Allen Chappell	1,422	20.12%
Total votes		7,066	100%

North Carolina House of Representatives 59th district general election, 2020
Party	Candidate	Votes	%
Republican	Jon Hardister (incumbent)	28,474	52.26%
Democratic	Nicole Quick	26,016	47.74%
Total votes		54,500	100%
Republican hold			

=== 2018 ===
North Carolina House of Representatives 59th district Republican primary election, 2018
Party	Candidate	Votes	%
Republican	Jon Hardister (incumbent)	2,692	68.83%
Republican	Mark McDaniel	1,013	25.90%
Republican	Karen C. Albright	206	5.27%
Total votes		3,911	100%

North Carolina House of Representatives 59th district general election, 2018
Party	Candidate	Votes	%
Republican	Jon Hardister (incumbent)	22,119	56.65%
Democratic	Steven A. Buccini	16,924	43.35%
Total votes		39,043	100%
Republican hold			

=== 2016 ===
North Carolina House of Representatives 58th district general election, 2016
Party	Candidate	Votes	%
Republican	Jon Hardister (incumbent)	28,980	60.32%
Democratic	Scott A. Jones	19,060	39.68%
Total votes		48,040	100%
Republican hold			

=== 2014 ===
North Carolina House of Representatives 58th district general election, 2014
Party	Candidate	Votes	%
Republican	Jon Hardister (incumbent)	19,784	60.20%
Democratic	Scott Jones	11,925	36.29%
Libertarian	Paul Meinhart	1,155	3.51%
Total votes		32,864	100%
Republican hold			

=== 2012 ===
North Carolina House of Representatives 59th district Republican primary election, 2012
Party	Candidate	Votes	%
Republican	Jon Hardister	6,737	57.97%
Republican	Sharon Kasica	3,538	30.44%
Republican	Timothy Cook	1,347	11.59%
Total votes		11,622	100%

North Carolina House of Representatives 59th district general election, 2012
Party	Candidate	Votes	%
Republican	Jon Hardister	32,872	100%
Total votes		32,872	100%
Republican win (new seat)			

=== 2010 ===
North Carolina House of Representatives 58th district general election, 2010
Party	Candidate	Votes	%
Democratic	Maggie Jeffus (incumbent)	11,928	52.65%
Republican	Thersea Yon	10,729	47.35%
Total votes		22,657	100%
Democratic hold			

=== 2008 ===
North Carolina House of Representatives 58th district general election, 2008
Party	Candidate	Votes	%
Democratic	Maggie Jeffus (incumbent)	25,193	64.17%
Republican	Jim Rumley	14,066	35.83%
Total votes		39,259	100%
Democratic hold			

=== 2006 ===
North Carolina House of Representatives 58th district general election, 2006
Party	Candidate	Votes	%
Democratic	Maggie Jeffus (incumbent)	10,044	59.48%
Republican	Jim Rumley	6,843	40.52%
Total votes		16,887	100%
Democratic hold			

=== 2004 ===
North Carolina House of Representatives 58th district general election, 2004
Party	Candidate	Votes	%
Democratic	Maggie Jeffus (incumbent)	18,327	57.33%
Republican	Jim Rumley	12,884	40.30%
Libertarian	Allison N. Jaynes	759	2.37%
Total votes		31,970	100%
Democratic hold			

=== 2002 ===
North Carolina House of Representatives 59th district Republican primary election, 2002
Party	Candidate	Votes	%
Republican	Alan Hawkes	1,488	53.35%
Republican	Patrick Tillman	1,301	46.65%
Total votes		2,789	100%

North Carolina House of Representatives 59th district general election, 2002
Party	Candidate	Votes	%
Democratic	Maggie Jeffus (incumbent)	12,175	54.39%
Republican	Alan Hawkes	9,553	42.68%
Libertarian	Allison Jaynes	656	2.93%
Total votes		22,384	100%
Democratic hold			

=== 2000 ===
North Carolina House of Representatives 59th district general election, 2000
Party	Candidate	Votes	%
Democratic	Pete Cunningham (incumbent)	13,658	100%
Total votes		13,658	100%
Democratic hold			
