= Liston B. Ramsey =

American politician

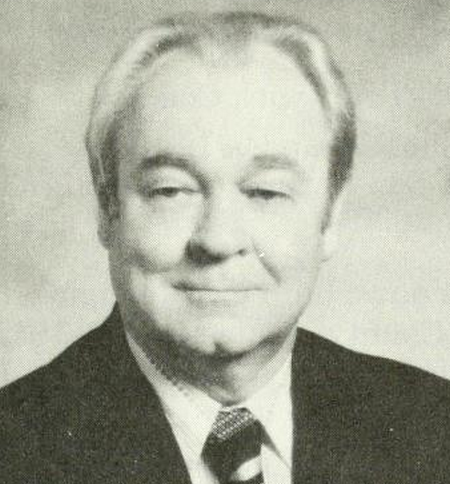

Speaker of the North Carolina House of Representatives
- In office January 14, 1981 – January 11, 1989
- Preceded by: Carl Stewart
- Succeeded by: Josephus Mavretic

Member of the North Carolina House of Representatives
- In office January 1, 1967 – January 1, 2001
- Preceded by: Constituency established
- Succeeded by: Margaret Carpenter
- Constituency: 47th District (1967-1973); 44th District (1973-1983); 52nd District (1983-2001)
- In office January 1, 1961 – January 1, 1965
- Preceded by: Fred Herschel Holcombe
- Succeeded by: Frances Crafton Ramsey
- Constituency: Madison County

Personal details
- Born: February 26, 1919 Marshall, North Carolina, U.S.
- Died: September 2, 2001 (aged 82) Madison County, North Carolina, U.S.
- Party: Democratic
- Spouse: Florence McDevitt
- Children: one daughter
- Education: Mars Hill College
- Occupation: merchant

Liston Bryan Ramsey (February 26, 1919 – September 2, 2001) was an American politician. A member of the North Carolina House of Representatives for nearly four decades, he served as its Speaker from 1981 until 1989.

== Early life ==
Liston Bryan Ramsey was born on February 26, 1919, to John Morgan Ramsey and Della Lee Bryan in Marshall, North Carolina, United States.

He was the valedictorian of his senior class at Marshall High School in 1936, and two years later he earned an associate's degree from Mars Hill College, then a junior college located in his native Madison County (in 1988, Mars Hill College would award him an honorary doctorate degree). During the Second World War, Ramsey served as a sergeant in the U.S. Army Air Corps in the Pacific Theater of the war. After the war, Ramsey was elected to serve on the town board of aldermen for Marshall, North Carolina.

== Political career ==
From 1958 to 1960 and in 1962 Ramsey served as chairman of the Madison County Democratic Executive Committee.

In 1960, running as a Democrat, Ramsey was elected to the North Carolina House of Representatives.

In 1964 Ramsey, a staunch ally of Zeno and E. Y. Ponder—the leaders of a political machine based in Madison County, lost his bid for reelection to his seat in the North Carolina House of Representatives to a Republican, F. Crafton Ramsey. The Ponders thus had no direct representation in state government, but Zeno dispatched Liston Ramsey to Raleigh, the state capital, anyway to take up residence while the North Carolina General Assembly was in session. Ramsey quickly formed a bloc with fellow Democrats from mountain counties, including representatives Mark Bennet and J. Thurston Arledge, to represent his concerns in state government. The group worked together to prevent changes to state procedure for jury selection that would allow for bipartisan input, as the under the existing system jury selection in Madison County was controlled by a single Democratic official.

Ramsey regained his seat in the state legislature in 1966 and became one of its most influential members. In 1981 he was elected Speaker of the House and would spend four terms in that post; he was the first legislator in North Carolina history to hold the Speaker's office for four terms (a record tenure matched only by Jim Black and Tim Moore). During his tenure as Speaker, he worked to transfer state funds to the often-neglected western mountain counties of the state, building roads and other public facilities that would not have existed otherwise. A major accomplishment of his time as Speaker was the creation of the Liston B. Ramsey Activity Center at Western Carolina University. The center, opened in 1986, features facilities for basketball, volleyball, and other sports, as well as sponsoring cultural activities on the Western Carolina campus.

In January 1989, Ramsey was ousted as Speaker of the House when Republican Governor Jim Martin secretly joined his party's forces with 20 Democratic state representatives led by Joe Mavretic. These Democrats, most of whom represented North Carolina's larger cities, had grown resentful of what they regarded as Ramsey's autocratic control of the legislature, and of his tendency to support representatives from small, rural counties over those from more urbanized areas. Ramsey's adversaries derisively nicknamed him "Boss Hogg" after the corrupt, old-time political boss in the popular 1970s TV series The Dukes of Hazzard. These twenty Democrats, including future Attorney General, Governor and Senator Roy Cooper, joined with the 46 Republicans in the State House to elect Mavretic as Speaker over Ramsey. Even after this surprise defeat, however, Ramsey continued to be an influential voice in the legislature. He voluntarily retired from the legislature in 1999, and died in 2001.

In 2002, Mars Hill College opened the Ramsey Center for Regional Studies. The Center houses Ramsey's official papers from his years in public office, and is dedicated to preserving the heritage and culture of the people of the Southern Appalachian Mountains. A section of Interstate 26 running between Asheville, North Carolina, and Johnson City, Tennessee, is also named in his honor.

North Carolina House of Representatives
Preceded by Fred Herschel Holcombe	Member of the North Carolina House of Representatives from Madison County; 1961-1965	Succeeded by Frances Crafton Ramsey
Preceded by Constituency established	Member of the North Carolina House of Representatives from the 47th district 1967-1973; Served alongside: Ernest Bryan Messer	Succeeded by Constituency abolished
Preceded by James Holshouser	Member of the North Carolina House of Representatives from the 44th district 1973-1983; Served alongside: Ernest Bryan Messer	Succeeded by Sam Lee Beam; David Webster Bumgardner Jr. Donald Rudisill Mauney Jr. Joseph Boxley Roberts III
Preceded by Constituency established	Member of the North Carolina House of Representatives from the 52nd district 1983-2001; Served alongside: Charles Millwee Beall, Phil Haire	Succeeded by Margaret Carpenter
Preceded by Carl Stewart	Speaker of the North Carolina House of Representatives; 1981-1989	Succeeded by Josephus Mavretic

== Works cited ==
- Cheney, John L. Jr. (1977). North Carolina Manual. Raleigh: North Carolina Secretary of State. OCLC 1245537.
