= Stephen W. Wood =

American politician from North Carolina

Steve Wood
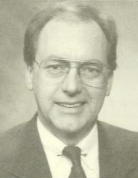
- Wood in the 1999 legislative manual

Member of the Forsyth County Board of Education from the 2nd district
- Incumbent
- Assumed office January 5, 2023
- Preceded by: Dana Caudill Jones; Lida Calvert Hayes; Marilyn Parker

Speaker pro tempore of the North Carolina House of Representatives
- In office January 1, 1997 – January 1, 1999
- Leader: Harold Brubaker
- Preceded by: Carolyn Russell
- Succeeded by: Joe Hackney

Member of the North Carolina House of Representatives
- In office January 1, 2003 – January 1, 2005
- Preceded by: Mary Jarrell (Redistricting)
- Succeeded by: Laura Wiley
- Constituency: 61st District
- In office January 1, 1989 – January 1, 2001
- Preceded by: Mary Jarrell
- Succeeded by: John Blust
- Constituency: 28th District (1989–1993); 27th District (1993–2001)
- In office January 1, 1985 – January 1, 1987
- Preceded by: Dorothy Burnley; Mary Jarrell
- Succeeded by: Mary Jarrell
- Constituency: 28th District

Personal details
- Born: Stephen Wray Wood; October 6, 1948 (age 77) Winston-Salem, North Carolina, U.S.
- Party: Republican; Reform (2000)
- Spouse: Starr Smith

Military service
- Allegiance: United States
- Branch/service: United States Army
- Years of service: 1970–1971
- Rank: Private first class

Stephen Wray Wood (born October 6, 1948) is an American politician who served as a Republican member of the North Carolina General Assembly representing the state's sixty-first House district, including constituents in Guilford county. Wood served eight terms in the State House from 1984–2005.

November 8, 2022, Wood was elected to the Winston Salem Forsyth County School System Board of Education for a four year term, 2022-2026.

== Education ==
Earned degrees include a BA in history/religion, Asbury University (Wilmore, Kentucky); Th.B in Bible/Theology, John Wesley University, (High Point, NC); MA in History, the University of North Carolina at Greensboro; M.Div., Houston Graduate School of Theology (Houston, Texas); and D.Min from Luther Rice University (Atlanta, Georgia). Postgraduate studies include Princeton Theological Seminary, Fuller Theological Seminary, and Earlham School of Religion. He is a member of the academic Phi Alpha Theta International Historical Fraternity.

Before election to the NC House he served as professor of history and education and assistant academic dean at John Wesley College, High Point, North Carolina, (1975-1981). He also served as adjunct professor for Houston Graduate School of Theology and Luther Rice University.

== Political career ==
During his 16-year tenure in the North Carolina State House, Wood was elected Speaker Pro-Tem, 1997–1999, becoming the second Republican elected to that post during the 20th century. Wood developed a reputation as a fiscal and social conservative sponsoring legislation to reduce the size and scope of government, lower tax burdens, and promote pro-life issues.

In the Legislature, he became the first Republican Chairman of the House Education Committee in 1995, leading the legislature to establish landmark Charter School legislation and reduce the size of the State Department of Public Instruction bureaucracy by nearly half, as well other educational reform measures including Lateral Entry for Teachers from the military, higher education, business and non-governmental entities, and the proposal for the first online public school academy.

As part of the Japan Learning Group with the Public School Forum in 1995, Wood traveled to Japan, consulting with educational and political leaders in that country regarding educational reform and school choice.

In 1999, Wood was selected a member of the Oxford International Roundtable on Education convened at Oxford University presenting a paper on School Choice, Charter Schools and Tax Credits. In 1992, Governor Jim Martin presented Wood the Order of the Longleaf Pine, the highest civilian award given by the state of North Carolina.

In 2001, after being primaried by John Blust for the 27th district House seat, Wood ran on the Reform party ballot line in the general election for his seat and spoke at the Reform Party National Convention that year.

Wood is a US Army veteran, (1970–1971). He served as a Veterans Service Officer for the State of North Carolina Division of Veterans Affairs, (1987–1989). He was elected as Vice-Chairman of the Guilford County Republican Party, (1980–1984), and served on the North Carolina Republican Party Executive Committee.

President George W. Bush appointed Wood to the Selective Service Commission in 2001, where he continues to serve.

=== Electoral history ===
==== 2026 ====
Forsyth County Board of Education 2nd district Republican primary election, 2026
Party	Candidate	Votes	%
Republican	Robert "Bob" Weiss	7,213	15.25%
Republican	Jill Nelson Berlin	5,578	11.79%
Republican	Allen Daniel	4,985	10.54%
Republican	Robert Barr (incumbent)	4,961	10.49%
Republican	Tracy Lesser	4,782	10.11%
Republican	Derrick Hinson	4,737	10.01%
Republican	Susan Miller (incumbent)	4,592	9.71%
Republican	Zachary Hubbard	4,097	8.66%
Republican	Steve Wood (incumbent)	3,719	7.86%
Republican	James Williams	2,647	5.59%
Total votes		47,311	100%

==== 2022 ====
Forsyth County Board of Education 2nd district Republican primary election, 2022
Party	Candidate	Votes	%
Republican	Robert Barr	9,269	14.34%
Republican	Stanley Elrod	9,123	14.12%
Republican	Leah Crowley (incumbent)	7,823	12.11%
Republican	Steve Wood	7,483	11.58%
Republican	Lida Calvert Hayes (incumbent)	6,799	10.52%
Republican	Susan Miller	6,254	9.68%
Republican	Holly Pegram	5,802	8.98%
Republican	Jimmie Boyd	4,831	7.48%
Republican	Jason Lucero	4,645	7.19%
Republican	Yvonne Williams	2,592	4.01%
Total votes		64,621	100%

Forsyth County Board of Education 2nd district general election, 2022
Party	Candidate	Votes	%
Republican	Leah Crowley (incumbent)	61,658	21.88%
Republican	Susan Miller (Note: Replacing Stanley Elrod.)	57,037	20.24%
Republican	Robert Barr	56,920	20.20%
Republican	Steve Wood	55,185	19.59%
Democratic	Jennifer Castillo	50,956	18.09%
Total votes		281,756	100%
Republican hold			
Republican hold			
Republican hold			
Republican hold			

==== 2004 ====
North Carolina House of Representative 61st district Republican primary election, 2004
Party	Candidate	Votes	%
Republican	Laura Wiley	2,515	51.48%
Republican	Steve Wood (incumbent)	2,370	48.52%
Total votes		4,885	100%

==== 2002 ====
North Carolina House of Representative 61st district Republican primary election, 2002
Party	Candidate	Votes	%
Republican	Steve Wood	1,522	32.99%
Republican	M. Christopher Whitley	1,230	26.66%
Republican	Robert L. "Bob" Fowler	1,101	23.87%
Republican	Sam Spagnola	760	16.48%
Total votes		4,613	100%

North Carolina House of Representative 61st district general election, 2002
Party	Candidate	Votes	%
Republican	Steve Wood	16,769	79.16%
Libertarian	Jennifer Schulz Medlock	4,415	20.84%
Total votes		21,184	100%
Republican gain from Democratic			

==== 2000 ====
North Carolina House of Representatives 27th district Republican primary election, 2000
Party	Candidate	Votes	%
Republican	John Blust	3,843	59.57%
Republican	Steve Wood (incumbent)	2,608	40.43%
Total votes		6,451	100%

North Carolina House of Representatives 27th district general election, 2000
Party	Candidate	Votes	%
Republican	John Blust	24,063	83.98%
Reform	Steve Wood (incumbent)	4,589	16.02%
Total votes		28,652	100%
Republican gain from Reform			

== Other work ==
He has served as a minister in Quaker (Friends) and United Methodist Churches since 1972. He served on the Board of the Friends Center at Guilford College (1980-1984) and was a founding member of the Triad Christian Counseling Center. (1980, and Preciousl Life Ministries in High Point. (1982)

Wood is a singer, songwriter, recording artist, public speaker and performer. His original songs include, "I'm On My Way to Heaven," recorded by the Dixie Melody Boys gospel music group. Recording credits include "Love and Devotion", with the Barney Pierce Family; "Travelin'Troubadour" (1975); "Titusoverture" (QCA Records/1978); "Sunday Brought The Cure"(TobytowneRecords,2013).

His song, "Sunday Brought the Cure," won the East Coast Songwriters Contest in the Christian Music/Inspirational category (June 2012), and is the title song on his 4th album. He is the Executive Producer and contributor of 8 songs to the CD, "Songs for Santa Isabel" (2015, Tobytowne Records), a compilation album of 22 songs in support of building the Bill Sessoms Memorial Nazarene Church in Santa Isabel, Brazil, in August 2015. Wood served as Executive Producer of the "Barney Pierce Tribute" album (2019), which included a compilation of Barney Pierce songs and recorded by various artists over 50 years----including Doyle Lawson and Quicksilver, The Friendly Four, the Gethsemane Quartet and others.

Acting/theater/performing experience includes an 'extra' in the George Clooney movie, Leatherheads (May 2007); the role of Burl Sanders in the gospel music comedy, Smoke on the Mountain, produced by the Little Theatre of Winston-Salem, North Carolina, (September 2007); an 'extra' in stock car racing film, Red Dirt Rising (November 2007); role of Ralph Levering in This Tender Place, written by Frank Levering, Cherry Orchard Theater, Cana, VA, (August 2008); "Tom Dooley," Wilkes Playmakers (2009); "Moonshine and Thunder: The Junior Johnson Story," Wilkes Playmakers, (2009); extra in "The Fifth Quarter, (2010); "Dearly Beloved", (Wiley), 2013, Twin City Stage, WS, NC.

Research and writing include book reviews and articles in "Quaker Life", "Piedmont Christian News," Voice of Evangelical Methodism, Journal of the Evangelical Theological Society, "21 Days Devotional", North Carolina Yearly Meeting, September 25, 2013), and biographical entries in the Dictionary of North Carolina Biography (Dr. James Wagner Davis and Rev. Jim H. Green, 1981).

In 2013, Wood was a Co-Founder of Global Missions Group (GMG) an interdenominational non-profit based in North Carolina, with a mission "to build churches that otherwise would not be built." GMG's first project built a church in the village of Santa Isabel, Brazil, in August 2015, on the banks of the Amazon River. GMG's most recent project is a partnership with the missions agency, Ardeo Global to build a new church in Manta, Ecuador, 2016-2017).

North Carolina House of Representatives
Preceded by Dorothy Burnley; Mary Jarrell	Member of the North Carolina House of Representatives from the 28th district 1985–1987; Served alongside: Richard Chalk Jr.	Succeeded by Mary Jarrell
Preceded by Mary Jarrell	Member of the North Carolina House of Representatives from the 28th district 1989–1993; Served alongside: Steve Arnold, Mary Jarrell	Succeeded by William Burton III
Preceded by Albert Lineberry Sr. Maggie Jeffus; Joanne Bowie	Member of the North Carolina House of Representatives from the 27th district 1993–2001	Succeeded by John Blust
Preceded by Art Pope	Member of the North Carolina House of Representatives from the 61st district 2003–2005	Succeeded by Laura Wiley
