= Maggie Jeffus =

American politician (1934–2025)

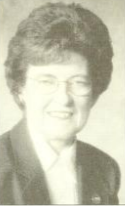

Member of the North Carolina House of Representatives
- In office January 1, 1997 – January 1, 2013
- Preceded by: John Cocklereece; Joanne Sharpe
- Succeeded by: Pricey Harrison (Redistricting)
- Constituency: 89th District (1997–2003); 59th District (2003–2013)
- In office January 1, 1991 – January 1, 1995
- Preceded by: Frank Julian Sizemore III
- Succeeded by: John Cocklereece; Joanne Sharpe
- Constituency: 27th District (1991–1993); 89th District (1993–1995)

Personal details
- Born: Margaret Alyne Moore; October 22, 1934 Roanoke, Virginia, U.S.
- Died: August 9, 2025 (aged 90) Burlington, North Carolina, U.S.
- Party: Democratic
- Spouse(s): Charles Oliver Jeffus (m. 1954) Theadore Thompson; David Bryce Goltare
- Education: University of North Carolina at Greensboro; Guilford College
- Profession: Educator

Margaret Alyne Moore Jeffus-Goltare (October 22, 1934 – August 9, 2025) was an American politician who was a Democratic member of the North Carolina House of Representatives. An educator from Greensboro, Jeffus served constituents in Guilford County from 1991–2013. Jeffus died in Burlington, North Carolina, on August 9, 2025, at the age of 90.

== Electoral history ==
=== 2010 ===
North Carolina House of Representatives 58th district general election, 2010
Party	Candidate	Votes	%
Democratic	Maggie Jeffus (incumbent)	11,928	52.65%
Republican	Thersea Yon	10,729	47.35%
Total votes		22,657	100%
Democratic hold			

=== 2008 ===
North Carolina House of Representatives 58th district general election, 2008
Party	Candidate	Votes	%
Democratic	Maggie Jeffus (incumbent)	25,193	64.17%
Republican	Jim Rumley	14,066	35.83%
Total votes		39,259	100%
Democratic hold			

=== 2006 ===
North Carolina House of Representatives 58th district general election, 2006
Party	Candidate	Votes	%
Democratic	Maggie Jeffus (incumbent)	10,044	59.48%
Republican	Jim Rumley	6,843	40.52%
Total votes		16,887	100%
Democratic hold			

=== 2004 ===
North Carolina House of Representatives 58th district general election, 2004
Party	Candidate	Votes	%
Democratic	Maggie Jeffus (incumbent)	18,327	57.33%
Republican	Jim Rumley	12,884	40.30%
Libertarian	Allison N. Jaynes	759	2.37%
Total votes		31,970	100%
Democratic hold			

=== 2002 ===
North Carolina House of Representatives 59th district Republican primary election, 2002
Party	Candidate	Votes	%
Republican	Alan Hawkes	1,488	53.35%
Republican	Patrick Tillman	1,301	46.65%
Total votes		2,789	100%

North Carolina House of Representatives 59th district general election, 2002
Party	Candidate	Votes	%
Democratic	Maggie Jeffus (incumbent)	12,175	54.39%
Republican	Alan Hawkes	9,553	42.68%
Libertarian	Allison Jaynes	656	2.93%
Total votes		22,384	100%
Democratic hold			

=== 2000 ===
North Carolina House of Representatives 89th district general election, 2000
Party	Candidate	Votes	%
Democratic	Mary Jarrell (incumbent)	25,799	30.29%
Democratic	Maggie Jeffus (incumbent)	24,246	28.46%
Republican	Joanne Sharpe	17,187	20.18%
Republican	Dottie Salerno	16,307	19.14%
Libertarian	Thomas A. "Tom" Bailey	1,642	1.93%
Total votes		85,181	100%
Democratic hold			
Democratic hold			

North Carolina House of Representatives
Preceded by Frank Julian Sizemore III	Member of the North Carolina House of Representatives from the 27th district 1991–1993; Served alongside: Joanne Bowie, Albert S. Lineberry	Succeeded by Stephen Wood
Preceded by Constituency established	Member of the North Carolina House of Representatives from the 89th district 1993–1995; Served alongside: Mary Jarrell	Succeeded by John Cocklereece; Joanne Sharpe
Preceded by John Cocklereece; Joanne Sharpe	Member of the North Carolina House of Representatives from the 89th district 1997–2003; Served alongside: Mary Jarrell	Succeeded by Mitchell Setzer
Preceded by Pete Cunningham	Member of the North Carolina House of Representatives from the 59th district 2003–2013	Succeeded by Jon Hardister
