= Margaret Carpenter =

American politician from North Carolina

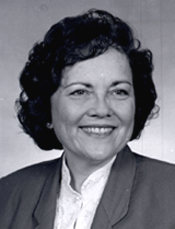

Member of the North Carolina House of Representatives from the 52nd district
- In office January 1, 2001 – January 1, 2003 Serving with Phil Haire
- Preceded by: Liston Ramsey
- Succeeded by: Ray Rapp (Redistricting)

Personal details
- Born: Margaret Mary; August 3, 1950 Detroit, Michigan
- Party: Republican
- Spouse(s): C.A. Bryant, Jr. (deceased 1985); Dale Richard Carpenter
- Children: Heather
- Education: University of Alabama (BS 1975); University of South Alabama (MEd 1989)
- Profession: Teacher (Special Education)

Margaret Mary Carpenter (born August 3, 1950 in Detroit, Michigan) was a Republican member of the North Carolina House of Representatives from the fifty-second district (Madison, Haywood, Graham, Swain, and part of Jackson counties) for one term (2001–2002). Carpenter, a resident of Waynesville, North Carolina, defeated Haywood County Commissioner and former Hazelwood Mayor, Mary Ann Enloe, by a narrow margin in 2000.

Carpenter was defeated by Mars Hill Mayor Ray Rapp for the newly drawn 118th district (Haywood, Madison, and Yancey counties) in 2002.

She is the daughter-in law of former State Senator Bob Carpenter of Macon County.

== Electoral history ==
=== 2006 ===
North Carolina House of Representatives 119th district general election, 2006
Party	Candidate	Votes	%
Democratic	Phil Haire (incumbent)	13,158	58.61%
Republican	Margaret Carpenter	9,292	41.39%
Total votes		22,450	100%
Democratic hold			

=== 2004 ===
North Carolina House of Representatives 119th district general election, 2004
Party	Candidate	Votes	%
Democratic	Phil Haire (incumbent)	14,147	51.74%
Republican	Margaret Carpenter	13,195	48.26%
Total votes		27,342	100%
Democratic hold			

=== 2002 ===
North Carolina House of Representatives 118th district general election, 2002
Party	Candidate	Votes	%
Democratic	Ray Rapp	13,717	53.34%
Republican	Margaret Carpenter (incumbent)	11,476	44.62%
Libertarian	Barry Williams	525	2.04%
Total votes		25,718	100%
Democratic gain from Republican			

=== 2000 ===
North Carolina House of Representatives 52nd district general election, 2000
Party	Candidate	Votes	%
Democratic	Phil Haire (incumbent)	24,983	27.50%
Republican	Margaret Carpenter	23,485	25.85%
Democratic	Mary Ann Enloe	23,381	25.74%
Republican	Jesse Sigmon	18,998	20.91%
Total votes		90,847	100%
Democratic hold			
Republican gain from Democratic			

North Carolina House of Representatives
Preceded by Liston Ramsey	Member of the North Carolina House of Representatives from the 52nd district 2001–2003; Served alongside: Phil Haire	Succeeded by Richard Morgan
