= John Blust =

American politician from North Carolina

John Marshall Blust
- Official portrait, 2025

Member of the North Carolina House of Representatives
- Incumbent
- Assumed office September 17, 2024
- Preceded by: John Faircloth
- Constituency: 62nd district
- In office January 1, 2001 – January 1, 2019
- Preceded by: Stephen Wood
- Succeeded by: John Faircloth
- Constituency: 27th district (2001–2003); 62nd district (2003–2019)

Member of the North Carolina Senate from the 32nd district
- In office May 9, 1996 – January 1, 1999
- Preceded by: Thomas B. Sawyer Sr.
- Succeeded by: Kay Hagan

Personal details
- Born: June 4, 1954 (age 72) Hamilton, Ohio, U.S.
- Party: Republican
- Spouse: Maria Blust
- Children: Barbara Blust
- Education: University of North Carolina at Chapel Hill (BS, JD)
- Profession: Attorney, Politician

John Marshall Blust (born June 4, 1954) is a Republican member of the North Carolina General Assembly, representing the state's 62nd House district, including constituents in Guilford County.

Blust is an Army veteran and a lawyer. From 1996 to 1999, Blust served in the North Carolina Senate before he was defeated for reelection by Kay Hagan, who would go on to be elected to the United States Senate.

In 2000, Blust was elected to the North Carolina House of Representatives, where he served until he declined to run for reelection in 2018.

In March 2016, Blust officially announced his candidacy for the United States House of Representatives for North Carolina's newly redrawn 13th District. He was defeated in the Republican primary by Ted Budd.

In September 2023, Blust announced that he would seek election to a new term in the N.C. House of Representatives to succeed retiring Representative John Faircloth in District 62. In September 2024, Blust was appointed to the seat after Faircloth's resignation. He defeated Democrat Marjorie Benbow for election to a full term.

== Electoral history ==
=== 2024 ===
North Carolina House of Representatives 62nd district Republican primary election, 2024
Party	Candidate	Votes	%
Republican	John Blust	3,971	34.10%
Republican	Britt Moore	2,299	19.74%
Republican	Michelle Bardsley	2,209	18.97%
Republican	Ann Schneider	1,942	16.68%
Republican	Jaxon Barber	1,223	10.50%
Total votes		11,644	100%

North Carolina House of Representatives 62nd district general election, 2024
Party	Candidate	Votes	%
Republican	John Blust (incumbent)	29,389	53.45%
Democratic	Marjorie Benbow	25,597	46.55%
Total votes		54,986	100%
Republican hold			

=== 2016 ===
North Carolina House of Representatives District 62, November 8, 2016
Party	Candidate	Votes	%
Republican	John Blust (incumbent)	32,010	100%
Total votes		32,010	100%
Republican hold			

=== 2014 ===
North Carolina House of Representatives District 62, November 8, 2014
Party	Candidate	Votes	%
Republican	John Blust (incumbent)	18,841	62.09%
Democratic	Sal Leone	11,504	37.91%
Total votes		30,345	100%
Republican hold			

=== 2012 ===
North Carolina House of Representatives District 62, November 6, 2012
Party	Candidate	Votes	%
Republican	John Blust (incumbent)	27,633	76.32%
Libertarian	Kent P. Wilsey	8,574	23.68%
Total votes		36,207	100%
Republican hold			

=== 2010 ===
North Carolina House of Representatives District 62, November 2, 2010
Party	Candidate	Votes	%
Republican	John Blust (incumbent)	21,829	83.65%
Libertarian	Jeffery Simon	4,266	16.35%
Total votes		26,095	100%
Republican hold			

=== 2008 ===
North Carolina House of Representatives District 62, November 4, 2008
Party	Candidate	Votes	%
Republican	John Blust (incumbent)	33,472	100%
Total votes		33,472	100%
Republican hold			

=== 2006 ===
North Carolina House of Representatives District 62, November 7, 2006
Party	Candidate	Votes	%
Republican	John Blust (incumbent)	16,116	100%
Total votes		16,116	100%
Republican hold			

=== 2004 ===
North Carolina House of Representatives District 62, November 2, 2004
Party	Candidate	Votes	%
Republican	John Blust (incumbent)	31,436	100%
Total votes		31,436	100%
Republican hold			

=== 2002 ===
North Carolina House of Representatives District 62, November 5, 2002
Party	Candidate	Votes	%
Republican	John Blust (incumbent)	13,060	62.06%
Democratic	Flossie Boyd-McIntyre (incumbent)	7,983	37.94%
Total votes		21,043	100%
Republican hold			

=== 2000 ===
North Carolina House of Representatives District 27, November 7, 2000
Party	Candidate	Votes	%
Republican	John Blust	24,063	83.98%
Reform	Stephen Wood (incumbent)	4,589	16.01%
Total votes		28,652	100%
Republican gain from Reform			

North Carolina Senate
Preceded by Thomas B. Sawyer Sr.	Member of the North Carolina Senate from the 32nd district 1996–1999	Succeeded by Kay Hagan
North Carolina House of Representatives
Preceded by Stephen Wood	Member of the North Carolina House of Representatives from the 27th district 2001–2003	Succeeded by Stanley Fox
Preceded by David Miner	Member of the North Carolina House of Representatives from the 62nd district 2003–2019	Succeeded by John Faircloth
Preceded by John Faircloth	Member of the North Carolina House of Representatives from the 62nd district 2024–Present	Incumbent
