= Nurham O. Warwick =

American politician (1940–2020)

Nurham Osbie Warwick
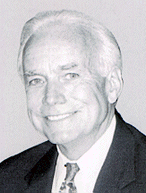

Member of the North Carolina House of Representatives from the 12th district
- In office January 1, 1997 – January 1, 2003
- Preceded by: Edward C. Bowen
- Succeeded by: Edd Nye (Redistricting)

Personal details
- Born: March 5, 1940 Clinton, North Carolina
- Died: October 21, 2020 (aged 80) Clinton, North Carolina
- Party: Democratic
- Education: North Carolina State University
- Profession: farmer, educator

Nurham Osbie Warwick (March 5, 1940 – October 21, 2020) was a politician in the American state of North Carolina. He served in the North Carolina House of Representatives from 1996 to 2002. He was a retired farmer and educator.

A native of Clinton, North Carolina, he was an alumnus of North Carolina State University. He also did graduate work at University of North Carolina at Chapel Hill and Pennsylvania State University. Warwick died at his home in Clinton, North Carolina on October 21, 2020.

North Carolina House of Representatives
Preceded by Edward C. Bowen	Member of the North Carolina House of Representatives from the 12th district 1997–2003	Succeeded by William Wainwright
