= William L. Wainwright =

American politician (1947–2012)

Deputy Minority Leader of the North Carolina House of Representatives
- In office January 26, 2011 – July 17, 2012
- Leader: Joe Hackney
- Succeeded by: Michael Wray

Speaker Pro Tempore of the North Carolina House of Representatives
- In office January 24, 2007 – January 26, 2011
- Leader: Joe Hackney
- Preceded by: Richard Morgan
- Succeeded by: Dale Folwell

Member of the North Carolina House of Representatives
- In office January 30, 1991 – July 17, 2012
- Preceded by: Bev Perdue
- Succeeded by: Barbara Lee
- Constituency: 3rd District (1991-1993); 79th District (1993-2003); 12th District (2003-2012)

Personal details
- Born: October 19, 1947 Somerville, Tennessee, U.S.
- Died: July 17, 2012 (aged 64) New Bern, North Carolina, U.S.
- Party: Democratic
- Education: Memphis State University (BS)
- Occupation: Presiding Elder

William L. Wainwright (October 19, 1947 – July 17, 2012) was a Democratic member of the North Carolina General Assembly representing the state's twelfth House district, including constituents in Craven and Lenoir counties. A church elder from Havelock, North Carolina, Wainwright was serving in his eleventh term in the state House of Representatives when he died in office after a prolonged illness.

== Biography ==
William Wainwright was born in Somerville, Tennessee and graduated with a BS degree from Memphis State University in 1970. He was pastor of Piney Grove AME Zion Church from 1985 to 1993.

In January 2007, Wainwright was nominated by his colleagues in the Democratic caucus as Speaker pro tempore of the House. He was elected on January 24, making him the first African American to serve in the number-two post in the House since Reconstruction. He was re-elected Speaker pro tempore in 2009. After Democrats lost their House majority, Wainwright was elected deputy minority leader.

== Footnotes ==
North Carolina House of Representatives
Preceded by Bev Perdue	Member of the North Carolina House of Representatives from the 3rd district 1991–1993; Served alongside: Gerald L. Anderson, Daniel T. Lilley	Succeeded by John M. Nichols
Preceded by Constituency established	Member of the North Carolina House of Representatives from the 79th district 1993–2003	Succeeded by Julia Craven Howard
Preceded by Nurham Warwick	Member of the North Carolina House of Representatives from the 12th district 2003–2012	Succeeded by Barbara Lee
Preceded by Richard Morgan	Speaker pro tempore of the North Carolina House of Representatives; 2007–2011	Succeeded by Dale Folwell
