= North Carolina's 62nd House district =

American legislative district

North Carolina's 62nd State House of Representatives district
Representative
John Blust; R–Greensboro
- Demographics: 66% White; 15% Black; 6% Hispanic; 8% Asian; 5% Multiracial
- Population (2024): 89,201

North Carolina's 62nd House district is one of 120 districts in the North Carolina House of Representatives. It has been represented by Republican John Blust since 2024.

== Geography ==
Since 2003, the district has included part of Guilford County. The district overlaps with the 26th, 27th, and 28th Senate districts.

== District officeholders ==
Representative	Party	Dates	Notes	Counties
District created January 1, 1985.
J. Raymond Sparrow (Cary)	Democratic	January 1, 1985 – January 1, 1987		1985–2003; Part of Wake County.
William Freeman (Fuquay-Varina)	Democratic	January 1, 1987 – January 1, 1989		1985–2003; Part of Wake County.
Paul Stam (Apex)	Republican	January 1, 1989 – January 1, 1991		1985–2003; Part of Wake County.
Larry Jordan (Apex)	Democratic	January 1, 1991 – January 1, 1993		1985–2003; Part of Wake County.
David Miner (Cary)	Republican	January 1, 1993 – January 1, 2003	Redistricted to the 36th district.	1985–2003; Part of Wake County.
John Blust (Greensboro)	Republican	January 1, 2003 – January 1, 2019	Redistricted from the 27th district. Retired.	2003–Present; Parts of Guilford County.
John Faircloth (High Point)	Republican	January 1, 2019 – September 6, 2024	Redistricted from the 61st district. Retired and Resigned early.	2003–Present; Parts of Guilford County.
Vacant		September 6, 2024 – September 17, 2024		2003–Present; Parts of Guilford County.
John Blust (Greensboro)	Republican	September 17, 2024 – Present	Appointed to finish Faircloth's term.	2003–Present; Parts of Guilford County.

== Election results ==
=== 2024 ===
North Carolina House of Representatives 62nd district Republican primary election, 2024
Party	Candidate	Votes	%
Republican	John Blust	3,971	34.10%
Republican	Britt Moore	2,299	19.74%
Republican	Michelle Bardsley	2,209	18.97%
Republican	Ann Schneider	1,942	16.68%
Republican	Jaxon Barber	1,223	10.50%
Total votes		11,644	100%

North Carolina House of Representatives 62nd district general election, 2024
Party	Candidate	Votes	%
Republican	John Blust (incumbent)	29,389	53.45%
Democratic	Marjorie Benbow	25,597	46.55%
Total votes		54,986	100%
Republican hold			

=== 2022 ===
North Carolina House of Representatives 62nd district general election, 2022
Party	Candidate	Votes	%
Republican	John Faircloth (incumbent)	20,404	52.16%
Democratic	Brandon Gray	18,717	47.84%
Total votes		39,121	100%
Republican hold			

=== 2020 ===
North Carolina House of Representatives 62nd district general election, 2020
Party	Candidate	Votes	%
Republican	John Faircloth (incumbent)	30,735	57.41%
Democratic	Brandon Gray	22,801	42.59%
Total votes		53,536	100%
Republican hold			

=== 2018 ===
North Carolina House of Representatives 62nd district general election, 2018
Party	Candidate	Votes	%
Republican	John Faircloth (incumbent)	22,568	57.29%
Democratic	Martha R. Shafer	16,823	42.71%
Total votes		39,391	100%
Republican hold			

=== 2016 ===
North Carolina House of Representatives 62nd district general election, 2016
Party	Candidate	Votes	%
Republican	John Blust (incumbent)	32,010	100%
Total votes		32,010	100%
Republican hold			

=== 2014 ===
North Carolina House of Representatives 62nd district general election, 2014
Party	Candidate	Votes	%
Republican	John Blust (incumbent)	18,841	62.09%
Democratic	Sal Leone	11,504	37.91%
Total votes		30,345	100%
Republican hold			

=== 2012 ===
North Carolina House of Representatives 62nd district general election, 2012
Party	Candidate	Votes	%
Republican	John Blust (incumbent)	27,633	76.32%
Libertarian	Kent P. Wilsey	8,574	23.68%
Total votes		36,207	100%
Republican hold			

=== 2010 ===
North Carolina House of Representatives 62nd district Republican primary election, 2010
Party	Candidate	Votes	%
Republican	John Blust (incumbent)	3,757	72.00%
Republican	Michael Garrett	1,461	28.00%
Total votes		5,218	100%

North Carolina House of Representatives 62nd district general election, 2010
Party	Candidate	Votes	%
Republican	John Blust (incumbent)	21,829	83.65%
Libertarian	Jeffery Simon	4,266	16.35%
Total votes		26,095	100%
Republican hold			

=== 2008 ===
North Carolina House of Representatives 62nd district general election, 2008
Party	Candidate	Votes	%
Republican	John Blust (incumbent)	33,472	100%
Total votes		33,472	100%
Republican hold			

=== 2006 ===
North Carolina House of Representatives 62nd district general election, 2006
Party	Candidate	Votes	%
Republican	John Blust (incumbent)	16,116	100%
Total votes		16,116	100%
Republican hold			

=== 2004 ===
North Carolina House of Representatives 62nd district Republican primary election, 2004
Party	Candidate	Votes	%
Republican	John Blust (incumbent)	3,814	74.80%
Republican	James P. Attaway	1,285	25.20%
Total votes		5,099	100%

North Carolina House of Representatives 62nd district general election, 2004
Party	Candidate	Votes	%
Republican	John Blust (incumbent)	31,436	100%
Total votes		31,436	100%
Republican hold			

=== 2002 ===
North Carolina House of Representatives 62nd district Republican primary election, 2002
Party	Candidate	Votes	%
Republican	John Blust (incumbent)	2,841	78.57%
Republican	Stephen Paul Jones	775	21.43%
Total votes		3,616	100%

North Carolina House of Representatives 62nd district general election, 2002
Party	Candidate	Votes	%
Republican	John Blust (incumbent)	13,060	62.06%
Democratic	Flossie Boyd-McIntyre (incumbent)	7,983	37.94%
Total votes		21,043	100%
Republican hold			

=== 2000 ===
North Carolina House of Representatives 62nd district general election, 2000
Party	Candidate	Votes	%
Republican	David Miner (incumbent)	29,854	59.37%
Democratic	Gerald W. Holleman	18,855	37.50%
Libertarian	Ian M. Sands	1,573	3.13%
Total votes		50,282	100%
Republican hold			
