= Richard T. Morgan =

American politician from North Carolina

Representative Richard Morgan
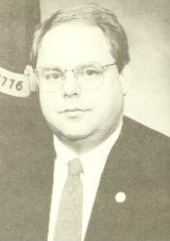
- Morgan in the 2001 legislative manual

Speaker pro tempore of the North Carolina House of Representatives
- In office January 1, 2005 – January 1, 2007
- Preceded by: Joe Hackney (2003)
- Succeeded by: William Wainwright

Co-Speaker of the North Carolina House of Representatives
- In office January 1, 2003 – January 1, 2005 Serving with Jim Black
- Preceded by: Jim Black (As Speaker)
- Succeeded by: Jim Black (As Speaker)

Member of the North Carolina House of Representatives
- In office January 1, 1991 – January 1, 2007
- Preceded by: James M. Craven
- Succeeded by: Joe Boylan
- Constituency: 31st District (1991-2003); 52nd District (2003-2007)

Personal details
- Born: Richard Timothy Morgan; July 12, 1952 Southern Pines, North Carolina
- Died: October 10, 2018 (aged 66) Durham, North Carolina
- Party: Republican
- Education: Pinecrest High School
- Alma mater: Sandhills Community College (AA); University of North Carolina at Chapel Hill (BA)
- Occupation: insurance broker, cattle farmer

Richard Timothy Morgan (July 12, 1952 – October 10, 2018) was a Republican member of the North Carolina House of Representatives representing the state's thirty-first and later fifty-second districts, including constituents in Moore County, for eight terms.

== Biography ==
Morgan was born in Southern Pines, North Carolina. He graduated from Pinecrest High School and received his associate in arts degree from Sandhills Community College. In 1974, Morgan received his bachelor's degree in political science from University of North Carolina at Chapel Hill. Morgan was an insurance broker and cattle farmer from Pinehurst, North Carolina. Morgan died on October 10, 2018, at the age of 66, at Duke University Medical Center, in Durham, North Carolina.

== Political career ==
Richard Morgan first ran as a Republican for the General Assembly in 1976 and 1980 and lost. Morgan next ran as a Republican for state insurance commissioner in 1984 and lost. Morgan was elected as a Republican to the North Carolina House of Representatives, representing Moore County, in 1990, and was re-elected from 1992 through 2004.

In the 2002 elections, Republican won a 61- to 59-seat majority in the North Carolina House of Representatives, and the Republican caucus nominated Rep. Leo Daughtry to be Speaker of the state House. Richard Morgan, a member of the Republican caucus, announced he would oppose Daughtry and run for Speaker of the House himself. After another Republican, Rep. Michael Decker later switched to the Democratic Party, creating a 60–60 tie. Morgan then led a Republican faction that agreed to form a coalition with the Democrats. The coalition elected two "co-speakers" of the House for the first time in state history, for the North Carolina General Assembly of 2003-2004. Speaker Jim Black, a Democrat, was called the "Democratic Speaker," and Morgan was called the "Republican Speaker." A number of Republicans—but less than a majority of the Republican caucus—considered Morgan's actions tantamount to betraying his party.

Rep. Morgan was removed from the North Carolina Republican Party's executive committee in May 2004 for "party disloyalty." In the 2006 election he was defeated by a Republican opponent in the primary.

In 2008, Morgan ran for North Carolina Superintendent of Public Instruction, losing to June Atkinson. In 2010, he ran for the State Senate but lost in the Republican primary to incumbent Harris Blake.

== Electoral history ==
=== 2010 ===
North Carolina Senate 22nd district Republican primary election, 2010
Party	Candidate	Votes	%
Republican	Harris Blake (incumbent)	6,679	65.86%
Republican	Richard Morgan	3,462	34.14%
Total votes		10,141	100%

=== 2008 ===
North Carolina Superintendent of Public Instruction Republican primary election, 2008
Party	Candidate	Votes	%
Republican	Richard Morgan	203,090	51.34%
Republican	Eric H. Smith	97,098	24.55%
Republican	Joe Johnson	95,382	24.11%
Total votes		395,570	100%

North Carolina Superintendent of Public Instruction general election, 2008
Party	Candidate	Votes	%
Democratic	June Atkinson (incumbent)	2,177,934	53.66%
Republican	Richard Morgan	1,881,075	46.34%
Total votes		4,059,009	100%
Democratic hold			

=== 2006 ===
North Carolina House of Representatives 52nd district Republican primary election, 2006
Party	Candidate	Votes	%
Republican	Joe Boylan	4,457	51.69%
Republican	Richard Morgan (incumbent)	4,166	48.31%
Total votes		8,623	100%

=== 2004 ===
North Carolina House of Representatives 52nd district Republican primary election, 2004
Party	Candidate	Votes	%
Republican	Richard Morgan (incumbent)	4,376	51.49%
Republican	Peggy Crutchfield	4,122	48.51%
Total votes		8,498	100%

North Carolina House of Representatives 52nd district general election, 2004
Party	Candidate	Votes	%
Republican	Richard Morgan (incumbent)	23,868	100%
Total votes		23,868	100%
Republican hold			

=== 2002 ===
North Carolina House of Representatives 52nd district general election, 2002
Party	Candidate	Votes	%
Republican	Richard Morgan (incumbent)	14,477	85.57%
Libertarian	Todd Unkefer	2,442	14.43%
Total votes		16,919	100%
Republican hold			

=== 2000 ===
North Carolina House of Representatives 31st district general election, 2000
Party	Candidate	Votes	%
Republican	Richard Morgan (incumbent)	16,525	54.84%
Democratic	Ellen Vann Crews	13,608	45.16%
Total votes		30,133	100%
Republican hold			

Party political offices
Preceded by Edwin W. Tenney Jr.	Republican nominee for North Carolina Commissioner of Insurance; 1984	Succeeded by Herman L. "Pete" Rednour
Preceded by Bill Fletcher	Republican nominee for North Carolina Superintendent of Public Instruction; 2008	Succeeded by John Tedesco
North Carolina House of Representatives
Preceded by James M. Craven	Member of the North Carolina House of Representatives from the 31st district 1991–2003	Succeeded by Mickey Michaux
Preceded by Margaret Carpenter; Phil Haire	Member of the North Carolina House of Representatives from the 52nd district 2003–2007	Succeeded by Joe Boylan
Political offices
Preceded by Jim Black	Co-Speaker of the North Carolina House of Representatives; 2003–2005; Served alongside: Jim Black	Succeeded by Jim Black
Preceded by Joe Hackney (2003)	Speaker pro tempore of the North Carolina House of Representatives; 2005–2007	Succeeded by William Wainwright
