= David M. Miner =

American politician from North Carolina (born 1962)

David Miner
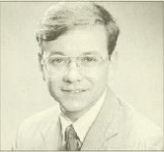
- Miner in the 2001 legislative manual

Member of the North Carolina House of Representatives
- In office January 1, 1993 – January 1, 2005
- Preceded by: Larry M. Jordan
- Succeeded by: Nelson Dollar
- Constituency: 62nd District (1993-2003); 36th District (2003-2005)

Personal details
- Born: December 23, 1962 (age 63)
- Party: Republican
- Education: Campbell University (BBA)

David Morris Miner (born December 23, 1962) is a former Republican member of the North Carolina House of Representatives. who represented the state's thirty-sixth House district, including constituents in Wake County. Miner was elected to six terms in the North Carolina House of Representatives from 1992 to 2004. He was chairman of the North Carolina House Finance Committee. Politically, Miner was an original Bush Pioneer in the 2000 campaign. Miner was elected in 1985 as National Chairman of the College Republican National Committee and served until 1987. He then joined the Jack Kemp for President campaign as a regional political director. In 1989 he founded Americans for a Balanced Budget, a citizen grassroots advocacy group. He served as chairman of the group until 2000.

In 2003, Miner founded The Resources Group, Inc., a government affairs company based in Cary, North Carolina.

Party political offices
Preceded by Ted Higgins	Chair of the College Republicans; 1985–1987	Succeeded by Stockton Reeves
North Carolina House of Representatives
Preceded by Larry M. Jordan	Member of the North Carolina House of Representatives from the 62nd district 1993–2003	Succeeded by John Blust
Preceded by Jim Black	Member of the North Carolina House of Representatives from the 36th district 2003–2005	Succeeded by Nelson Dollar
