= James B. Black =

American politician from North Carolina

Jim Black
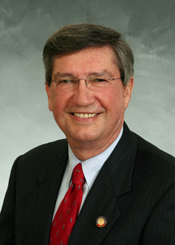

Speaker of the North Carolina House of Representatives
- In office January 1, 1999 – January 1, 2007 Serving with Richard Morgan (2003–2005)
- Preceded by: Harold Brubaker
- Succeeded by: Joe Hackney

Member of the North Carolina House of Representatives
- In office January 1, 1991 – February 14, 2007
- Preceded by: Lawrence Edward Diggs
- Succeeded by: Tricia Cotham
- Constituency: 36th District (1991-2003); 100th District (2003-2007)
- In office January 1, 1981 – January 1, 1985
- Preceded by: Marilyn R. Bissell
- Succeeded by: Raymond Allan Warren
- Constituency: 36th District

Personal details
- Born: James Boyce Black; March 25, 1935 (age 91) Matthews, North Carolina, U.S.
- Party: Democratic
- Education: Southern College of Optometry, O.D.
- Occupation: Optometrist

James Boyce Black (born March 25, 1935) is a member of the North Carolina Democratic Party, and a former member of the North Carolina General Assembly, who represented the state's 100th House district, including constituents in Mecklenburg County. An optometrist from Matthews, North Carolina, Black was elected to 11 (non-consecutive) terms in the House of Representatives, and served as Speaker of the House from January 1999 through the end of 2006, when scandal forced him to give up the leadership post. For the 2003-2004 legislative session Black was elected to serve as "Co-Speaker" with Republican Richard T. Morgan serving as the other Co-Speaker.

Black earned an O.D. from the Southern College of Optometry. He served in the United States Navy and in the United States Naval Reserve.

== Fall from power ==
In 2005 and 2006, Black was linked to a series of scandals involving, among other things, the party-switching Rep. Michael P. Decker, and the North Carolina lottery, established the previous year. The proceedings led to convictions for several involved figures, including Decker, media and public relations consultant Kevin L. Geddings and political aide Meredith Norris. Decker testified under oath that he instigated a bribery scheme of which Black was alleged to be a "co-conspirator". Black has consistently denied those allegations.

Although Black was not indicted while serving as speaker, the situation drew ire from the North Carolina Republican Party, which involved the scandal in their November election campaigns.

Black was re-elected in November 2006, over Republican political novice Hal Jordan. Meanwhile, he led efforts to increase the Democratic majority in the State House.

In December 2006, Black announced that he would not seek another term as Speaker. That was followed in January 2007 by his announcement that he would not run for re-election to the House in 2008.

Black pleaded guilty to a federal charge of public corruption on February 15, 2007, a felony carrying a maximum sentence of 10 years in prison and a $250,000 fine. He admitted to accepting funds from chiropractors while their professional group had legislation pending in the North Carolina General Assembly. As a result, he resigned from the General Assembly on February 14, 2007.

Federal prosecutors have said the plea deal with Black involves his assistance in their continued investigation into political corruption in North Carolina government.

Black's agreement with federal prosecutors did not protect him from state prosecution. Indeed, days after his federal plea, he entered into a separate Alford plea agreement with the district attorney of Wake County, whose jurisdiction includes the state capital, Raleigh.

On July 11, 2007, Black was sentenced by Judge Terrence Boyle to five years, three months in prison, three years of probation, and a $50,000 fine. Black was sentenced in state court as well in 2007 and 2009, but was allowed to serve his state sentences concurrently with his federal prison time.

In 2010, Black was released from federal prison in Georgia and returned to Mecklenburg County to serve the remaining six months of his term either at a halfway house or under house arrest.

North Carolina House of Representatives
Preceded by Marilyn R. Bissell	Member of the North Carolina House of Representatives from the 36th district 1981–1985; Served alongside: Louise Smith Brennan, Ruth Easterling, Gus Nickolas Economos, Jo Graham Foster, Harold Parks Helms, LeRoy Page Spoon, Jr., Benjamin Thompson Tison, III, Philip O. Berry	Succeeded by Raymond Allan Warren
Preceded by Lawrence Edward Diggs	Member of the North Carolina House of Representatives from the 36th district 1991–2003	Succeeded by David Miner
Preceded by Constituency established	Member of the North Carolina House of Representatives from the 100th district 2003–2007	Succeeded by Tricia Cotham
Political offices
Preceded by Harold Brubaker	Speaker of the North Carolina House of Representatives; 1999–2007; Served alongside: Richard Morgan (2003–2005)	Succeeded by Joe Hackney
