= Joanne W. Bowie =

American politician (born 1937)

Joanne Walker Bowie
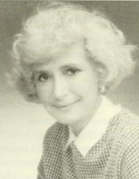
- Bowie in the 1999 legislative manual
- Born: June 18, 1937 (age 89); Terre Haute, Indiana
- Known for: Republican member of the North Carolina General Assembly

Joanne Walker Bowie (born June 18, 1937) was a Republican member of the North Carolina General Assembly representing the state's fifty-seventh House district, including constituents in Guilford county. Between 1989 and 2004, she was a member of the North Carolina House of Representatives.

== Early life ==
Bowie was born in Terre Haute, Indiana, the daughter of Philip and Iona Brown Walker. She earned a BS and an MS from West Virginia University. She also studied at the University of Kentucky.

North Carolina House of Representatives
Preceded by Margaret Pollard Kesee-Forrester	Member of the North Carolina House of Representatives from the 27th district 1989–1993; Served alongside: Albert S. Lineberry, Frank Julian Sizemore III, Maggie Jeffus	Succeeded by Stephen Wood
Preceded by Michael Decker	Member of the North Carolina House of Representatives from the 29th district 1993–2003	Succeeded by Paul Miller
Preceded by Connie Wilson	Member of the North Carolina House of Representatives from the 57th district 2003–2005	Succeeded by Pricey Harrison
