= R. Phillip Haire =

American politician from North Carolina (1936–2024)

Phil Haire
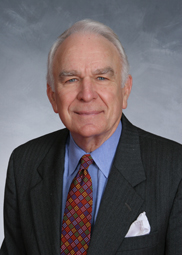

Member of the North Carolina House of Representatives
- In office January 1, 1999 – January 1, 2013
- Preceded by: Charles Millwee Beall
- Succeeded by: Joe Sam Queen
- Constituency: 52nd District (1999-2003); 119th District (2003-2013)

Personal details
- Born: Robert Phillip Haire; May 1, 1936 Caretta, West Virginia, U.S.
- Died: October 8, 2024 (aged 88)
- Party: Democratic
- Occupation: Attorney

Robert Phillip Haire (May 1, 1936 – October 8, 2024) was an American politician who was a Democratic member of the North Carolina House of Representatives representing District 119, covering Haywood, Jackson, Macon, and Swain counties. An attorney from Sylva, North Carolina, Haire served a total of seven terms in the state House. He announced in December 2011 that he would not seek another term in the House.

== Personal life ==
Haire was born on May 1, 1936 to Herman Earl Haire (1908-1995) and Pauline Jackson (1910-1917) in Caretta, West Virginia and grew up in West Jefferson, North Carolina. He was of Irish, English, and German descent. He married his first wife, Nancye Carol Smathers, on August 29, 1959 in Waynesville, North Carolina. He later married Connie M. and had four children. Haire died on October 8, 2024, at the age of 88.

== Electoral history ==
=== 2010 ===
North Carolina House of Representatives 119th district general election, 2010
Party	Candidate	Votes	%
Democratic	Phil Haire (incumbent)	12,637	55.95%
Republican	Dodie Allen	9,951	44.05%
Total votes		22,588	100%
Democratic hold			

=== 2008 ===
North Carolina House of Representatives 119th district general election, 2008
Party	Candidate	Votes	%
Democratic	Phil Haire (incumbent)	19,411	61.59%
Republican	Dodie Allen	12,104	38.41%
Total votes		31,515	100%
Democratic hold			

=== 2006 ===
North Carolina House of Representatives 119th district general election, 2006
Party	Candidate	Votes	%
Democratic	Phil Haire (incumbent)	13,158	58.61%
Republican	Margaret Carpenter	9,292	41.39%
Total votes		22,450	100%
Democratic hold			

=== 2004 ===
North Carolina House of Representatives 119th district general election, 2004
Party	Candidate	Votes	%
Democratic	Phil Haire (incumbent)	14,147	51.74%
Republican	Margaret Carpenter	13,195	48.26%
Total votes		27,342	100%
Democratic hold			

=== 2002 ===
North Carolina House of Representatives 119th district general election, 2002
Party	Candidate	Votes	%
Democratic	Phil Haire (incumbent)	11,238	55.05%
Republican	Kaye Matthews	9,175	44.95%
Total votes		20,413	100%
Democratic hold			

North Carolina House of Representatives
Preceded by Charles Millwee Beall	Member of the North Carolina House of Representatives from the 52nd district 1999–2003; Served alongside: Liston Ramsey, Margaret Carpenter	Succeeded by Richard Morgan
Preceded by Constituency established	Member of the North Carolina House of Representatives from the 119th district 2003–2013	Succeeded by Joe Sam Queen
