= Constance K. Wilson =

American politician

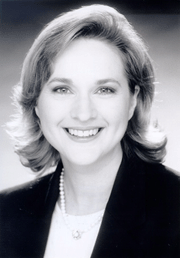
Constance K. Wilson

Constance Kramer Wilson (born August 9, 1959) was a Republican member of the North Carolina General Assembly representing the state's one hundred fourth district, including constituents in Mecklenburg county. She was born in Dayton, Ohio. Constance received her B.S. in Finance from Indiana University. Later in life, she relocated to Charlotte, North Carolina, where she was elected to the state house six times, resigning on October 15, 2004, shortly before completing her sixth term. During her tenure, she participated in committees addressing family law issues, including a 1996 study on grandparent visitation rights, reflecting conservative priorities on familial structures. Wilson previously served one term in the State Senate.

Since her retirement from the state legislature Wilson has worked as a lobbyist.

North Carolina Senate
Preceded by Laurence Arthur Cobb	Member of the North Carolina Senate from the 35th district 1989–1991	Succeeded by John Gerald Blackmon
North Carolina House of Representatives
Preceded by Harry Clinton Grimmer	Member of the North Carolina House of Representatives from the 57th district 1993–2003	Succeeded by Joanne Bowie
Preceded by Constituency established	Member of the North Carolina House of Representatives from the 104th district 2003–2005	Succeeded by Ed McMahan
