= North Carolina's 36th House district =

American legislative district

North Carolina's 36th State House of Representatives district
Representative
Julie von Haefen; D–Apex
- Demographics: 72% White; 8% Black; 8% Hispanic; 6% Asian; 1% Other; 5% Multiracial
- Population (2024): 83,910

North Carolina's 36th House district is one of 120 districts in the North Carolina House of Representatives. It has been represented by Democrat Julie von Haefen since 2019.

== Geography ==
Since 2003, the district has included part of Wake County. The district overlaps with the 13th and 17th Senate districts.

== District officeholders ==
=== Multi-member district ===
Representative	Party	Dates	Notes	Representative	Party	Dates	Notes	Representative	Party	Dates	Notes	Representative	Party	Dates	Notes	Representative	Party	Dates	Notes	Representative	Party	Dates	Notes	Representative	Party	Dates	Notes	Representative	Party	Dates	Notes	Counties
District created January 1, 1967.
Jack Baugh (Charlotte)	Democratic	January 1, 1967 – January 1, 1971		Jim Beatty (Charlotte)	Democratic	January 1, 1967 – January 1, 1973		Patrick Hunter (Charlotte)	Democratic	January 1, 1967 – January 1, 1969		Arthur Jones (Charlotte)	Democratic	January 1, 1967 – January 1, 1971		James Vogler (Charlotte)	Democratic	January 1, 1967 – January 1, 1973	Redistricted from the Mecklenburg County district.	Richard Calvert (Charlotte)	Republican	January 1, 1967 – January 1, 1969		James Carson Jr. (Charlotte)	Republican	January 1, 1967 – January 1, 1971						1967–1983; All of Mecklenburg County.
Jack Baugh (Charlotte)	Democratic	January 1, 1967 – January 1, 1971		Jim Beatty (Charlotte)	Democratic	January 1, 1967 – January 1, 1973		Hugh Campbell Jr. (Charlotte)	Democratic	January 1, 1969 – January 1, 1973		Arthur Jones (Charlotte)	Democratic	January 1, 1967 – January 1, 1971		James Vogler (Charlotte)	Democratic	January 1, 1967 – January 1, 1973	Redistricted from the Mecklenburg County district.	Ernest Hicks (Charlotte)	Democratic	January 1, 1969 – January 1, 1973		James Carson Jr. (Charlotte)	Republican	January 1, 1967 – January 1, 1971						1967–1983; All of Mecklenburg County.
Peter Foley (Charlotte)	Democratic	January 1, 1971 – January 1, 1973		Jim Beatty (Charlotte)	Democratic	January 1, 1967 – January 1, 1973		Hugh Campbell Jr. (Charlotte)	Democratic	January 1, 1969 – January 1, 1973		Craig Lawing (Charlotte)	Democratic	January 1, 1971 – January 1, 1977	Retired to run for State Senate.	James Vogler (Charlotte)	Democratic	January 1, 1967 – January 1, 1973	Redistricted from the Mecklenburg County district.	Ernest Hicks (Charlotte)	Democratic	January 1, 1969 – January 1, 1973		Laurence Cobb (Charlotte)	Republican	January 1, 1971 – January 1, 1977						1967–1983; All of Mecklenburg County.
Jo Graham Foster (Charlotte)	Democratic	January 1, 1973 – January 1, 1985	Redistricted to the 56th district.	Ben Tison (Charlotte)	Democratic	January 1, 1973 – January 1, 1983	Retired to run for State Senate.	Marilyn Bissell (Charlotte)	Republican	January 1, 1973 – January 1, 1981		Craig Lawing (Charlotte)	Democratic	January 1, 1971 – January 1, 1977	Retired to run for State Senate.	David Jordan (Charlotte)	Republican	January 1, 1973 – January 1, 1975		Roy Spoon (Charlotte)	Republican	January 1, 1973 – January 1, 1985	Redistricted to the 57th district.	Laurence Cobb (Charlotte)	Republican	January 1, 1971 – January 1, 1977		Carolyn Mathis (Charlotte)	Republican	January 1, 1973 – January 1, 1977	Retired to run for State Senate.	1967–1983; All of Mecklenburg County.
Jo Graham Foster (Charlotte)	Democratic	January 1, 1973 – January 1, 1985	Redistricted to the 56th district.	Ben Tison (Charlotte)	Democratic	January 1, 1973 – January 1, 1983	Retired to run for State Senate.	Marilyn Bissell (Charlotte)	Republican	January 1, 1973 – January 1, 1981		Craig Lawing (Charlotte)	Democratic	January 1, 1971 – January 1, 1977	Retired to run for State Senate.	H. Parks Helms (Charlotte)	Democratic	January 1, 1975 – January 1, 1985		Roy Spoon (Charlotte)	Republican	January 1, 1973 – January 1, 1985	Redistricted to the 57th district.	Laurence Cobb (Charlotte)	Republican	January 1, 1971 – January 1, 1977		Carolyn Mathis (Charlotte)	Republican	January 1, 1973 – January 1, 1977	Retired to run for State Senate.	1967–1983; All of Mecklenburg County.
Jo Graham Foster (Charlotte)	Democratic	January 1, 1973 – January 1, 1985	Redistricted to the 56th district.	Ben Tison (Charlotte)	Democratic	January 1, 1973 – January 1, 1983	Retired to run for State Senate.	Marilyn Bissell (Charlotte)	Republican	January 1, 1973 – January 1, 1981		Louise Brennan (Charlotte)	Democratic	January 1, 1977 – January 1, 1985		H. Parks Helms (Charlotte)	Democratic	January 1, 1975 – January 1, 1985		Roy Spoon (Charlotte)	Republican	January 1, 1973 – January 1, 1985	Redistricted to the 57th district.	Ruth Easterling (Charlotte)	Democratic	January 1, 1977 – January 1, 1985	Redistricted to the 58th district.	Gus Economos (Charlotte)	Democratic	January 1, 1977 – January 1, 1985		1967–1983; All of Mecklenburg County.
Jo Graham Foster (Charlotte)	Democratic	January 1, 1973 – January 1, 1985	Redistricted to the 56th district.	Ben Tison (Charlotte)	Democratic	January 1, 1973 – January 1, 1983	Retired to run for State Senate.	Jim Black (Matthews)	Democratic	January 1, 1981 – January 1, 1985		Louise Brennan (Charlotte)	Democratic	January 1, 1977 – January 1, 1985		H. Parks Helms (Charlotte)	Democratic	January 1, 1975 – January 1, 1985		Roy Spoon (Charlotte)	Republican	January 1, 1973 – January 1, 1985	Redistricted to the 57th district.	Ruth Easterling (Charlotte)	Democratic	January 1, 1977 – January 1, 1985	Redistricted to the 58th district.	Gus Economos (Charlotte)	Democratic	January 1, 1977 – January 1, 1985		1967–1983; All of Mecklenburg County.
Jo Graham Foster (Charlotte)	Democratic	January 1, 1973 – January 1, 1985	Redistricted to the 56th district.	Phillip Berry (Charlotte)	Democratic	January 1, 1983 – January 1, 1985		Jim Black (Matthews)	Democratic	January 1, 1981 – January 1, 1985		Louise Brennan (Charlotte)	Democratic	January 1, 1977 – January 1, 1985		H. Parks Helms (Charlotte)	Democratic	January 1, 1975 – January 1, 1985		Roy Spoon (Charlotte)	Republican	January 1, 1973 – January 1, 1985	Redistricted to the 57th district.	Ruth Easterling (Charlotte)	Democratic	January 1, 1977 – January 1, 1985	Redistricted to the 58th district.	Gus Economos (Charlotte)	Democratic	January 1, 1977 – January 1, 1985		1967–1983; All of Mecklenburg County.

=== Single-member district ===
Representative	Party	Dates	Notes	Counties
Ray Warren (Mint Hill)	Republican	January 1, 1985 – January 1, 1989		1985–2003; Part of Mecklenburg County.
Larry Diggs (Charlotte)	Republican	January 1, 1989 – January 1, 1991		1985–2003; Part of Mecklenburg County.
Jim Black (Matthews)	Democratic	January 1, 1991 – January 1, 2003	Redistricted to the 100th district.	1985–2003; Part of Mecklenburg County.
David Miner (Cary)	Republican	January 1, 2003 – January 1, 2005	Redistricted from the 62nd district. Lost re-nomination.	2003–Present; Part of Wake County.
Nelson Dollar (Cary)	Republican	January 1, 2005 – January 1, 2019	Lost re-election.	2003–Present; Part of Wake County.
Julie von Haefen (Apex)	Democratic	January 1, 2019 – Present		2003–Present; Part of Wake County.

== Election results ==
=== 2024 ===
North Carolina House of Representatives 36th district general election, 2024
Party	Candidate	Votes	%
Democratic	Julie von Haefen (incumbent)	28,629	54.52%
Republican	Becki Allen	22,364	42.59%
Libertarian	Travis Groo	1,521	2.90%
Total votes		52,514	100%
Democratic hold			

=== 2022 ===
North Carolina House of Representatives 36th district general election, 2022
Party	Candidate	Votes	%
Democratic	Julie von Haefen (incumbent)	21,966	56.10%
Republican	John Harris	16,220	41.43%
Libertarian	Kyle Ward	968	2.47%
Total votes		39,154	100%
Democratic hold			

=== 2020 ===
North Carolina House of Representatives 36th district Republican primary election, 2020
Party	Candidate	Votes	%
Republican	Kim Coley	3,787	56.00%
Republican	Gil Pagan	2,975	44.00%
Total votes		6,762	100%

North Carolina House of Representatives 36th district general election, 2020
Party	Candidate	Votes	%
Democratic	Julie von Haefen (incumbent)	31,644	53.18%
Republican	Kim Coley	25,656	43.11%
Libertarian	Bruce Basson	2,206	3.71%
Total votes		59,506	100%
Democratic hold			

=== 2018 ===
North Carolina House of Representatives 36th district general election, 2018
Party	Candidate	Votes	%
Democratic	Julie von Haefen	21,551	49.52%
Republican	Nelson Dollar (incumbent)	20,667	47.49%
Libertarian	Robyn Haley Pegram	1,305	3.00%
Total votes		43,523	100%
Democratic gain from Republican			

=== 2016 ===
North Carolina House of Representatives 36th district Democratic primary election, 2016
Party	Candidate	Votes	%
Democratic	Jennifer Ferrell	7,951	75.18%
Democratic	Woodie Cleary	2,625	24.82%
Total votes		10,576	100%

North Carolina House of Representatives 36th district Republican primary election, 2016
Party	Candidate	Votes	%
Republican	Nelson Dollar (incumbent)	7,913	55.73%
Republican	Mark Villee	6,286	44.27%
Total votes		14,199	100%

North Carolina House of Representatives 36th district general election, 2016
Party	Candidate	Votes	%
Republican	Nelson Dollar (incumbent)	25,295	49.26%
Democratic	Jennifer Ferrell	23,875	46.49%
Libertarian	Brian Irving	2,184	4.25%
Total votes		51,354	100%
Republican hold			

=== 2014 ===
North Carolina House of Representatives 36th district general election, 2014
Party	Candidate	Votes	%
Republican	Nelson Dollar (incumbent)	19,159	54.34%
Democratic	Lisa Baker	16,097	45.66%
Total votes		35,256	100%
Republican hold			

=== 2012 ===
North Carolina House of Representatives 36th district general election, 2012
Party	Candidate	Votes	%
Republican	Nelson Dollar (incumbent)	26,217	54.96%
Democratic	Lisa Baker	21,485	45.04%
Total votes		47,702	100%
Republican hold			

=== 2010 ===
North Carolina House of Representatives 36th district general election, 2010
Party	Candidate	Votes	%
Republican	Nelson Dollar (incumbent)	17,477	58.84%
Democratic	Robin Anderson	12,225	41.16%
Total votes		29,702	100%
Republican hold			

=== 2008 ===
North Carolina House of Representatives 36th district general election, 2008
Party	Candidate	Votes	%
Republican	Nelson Dollar (incumbent)	21,862	51.16%
Democratic	Al Swanstrom	20,872	48.84%
Total votes		42,734	100%
Republican hold			

=== 2006 ===
North Carolina House of Representatives 36th district general election, 2006
Party	Candidate	Votes	%
Republican	Nelson Dollar (incumbent)	12,305	50.69%
Democratic	Greer Beaty	11,970	49.31%
Total votes		24,275	100%
Republican hold			

=== 2004 ===
North Carolina House of Representatives 36th district Republican primary election, 2004
Party	Candidate	Votes	%
Republican	Nelson Dollar	3,645	64.25%
Republican	David Miner (incumbent)	2,028	35.75%
Total votes		5,673	100%

North Carolina House of Representatives 36th district general election, 2004
Party	Candidate	Votes	%
Republican	Nelson Dollar	24,166	82.72%
Libertarian	Gary Goodson	5,049	17.28%
Total votes		29,215	100%
Republican hold			

=== 2002 ===
North Carolina House of Representatives 36th district Republican primary election, 2002
Party	Candidate	Votes	%
Republican	David Miner (incumbent)	3,593	80.91%
Republican	Charles Cromer	848	19.09%
Total votes		4,441	100%

North Carolina House of Representatives 36th district general election, 2002
Party	Candidate	Votes	%
Republican	David Miner (incumbent)	18,957	86.11%
Libertarian	Gregory A. Clayton	3,059	13.89%
Total votes		22,016	100%
Republican hold			

=== 2000 ===
North Carolina House of Representatives 36th district general election, 2000
Party	Candidate	Votes	%
Democratic	Jim Black (incumbent)	13,020	64.14%
Republican	Cheryl Jones	7,280	35.86%
Total votes		20,300	100%
Democratic hold			
