= Allison Jaynes =

American space physicist

Allison N. Jaynes is an American experimental plasma and space physicist. Her research concerns the interaction of plasma from the Sun with Earth's magnetosphere and Van Allen radiation belt, and their effects on the atmosphere and auroras; it includes the use of rocket-based probes to observe auroras. She is an associate professor and the F. Wendell Miller Distinguished Professor in the Department of Physics and Astronomy at the University of Iowa.

== Education and career ==
Jaynes majored in physics at the University of North Carolina at Greensboro (UNCG), graduating in 2006. Active in the Libertarian club at UNCG, Jaynes faced disciplinary action for organizing a free speech protest in front of the campus library, outside of the designated free speech zones. The university later dropped the charges and established a committee to review their free speech policy.

She completed a Ph.D. in physics at the University of New Hampshire in 2013, under the supervision of Marc R. Lessard. After postdoctoral work as a research scientist at the University of Colorado Boulder Laboratory for Atmospheric and Space Physics from 2013 to 2017, she joined the University of Iowa as an assistant professor in 2017. She was promoted to associate professor in 2022, and given the F. Wendell Miller Distinguished Professorship in 2023.

== Recognition ==
- Jaynes received a National Science Foundation CAREER Award in 2020.
- She was a 2023 recipient of the Katherine E. Weimer Award for Women in Plasma Physics of the American Physical Society and of the James B. Macelwane Medal of the American Geophysical Union.
- In the same year, she was named as a Fellow of the American Geophysical Union.
