= Ruth M. Easterling =

American politician from North Carolina

Ruth Easterling
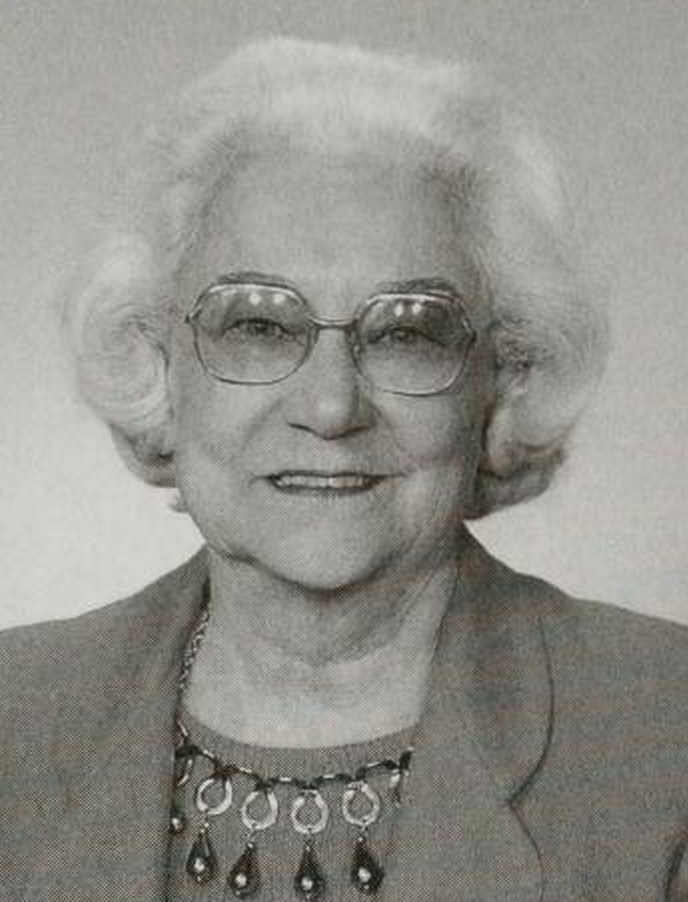

Member of the North Carolina House of Representatives
- In office January 1, 1977 – January 1, 2003
- Preceded by: Laurence Arthur Cobb; William Craig Lawing; Carolyn Williamson Mathias
- Succeeded by: Becky Carney (Redistricting)
- Constituency: 36th District (1977-1985); 58th District (1985-2003)

Personal details
- Born: December 26, 1910 Blacksburg, South Carolina, U.S.
- Died: November 1, 2006 (aged 95) Charlotte, North Carolina, U.S.
- Party: Democratic
- Education: Limestone College, Appalachian State University
- Profession: politician

Ruth Elizabeth Moss Easterling (December 26, 1910 – November 1, 2006) was a Democratic member of the North Carolina House of Representatives for thirteen terms. She was born December 26, 1910, in Blacksburg, South Carolina. She was an alumnus of Limestone College and Appalachian State University.

After serving on the city council of Charlotte, Easterling was first elected to the legislature in 1976, at age 65. Before retirement she was the co-chairwoman of the appropriations committee. She retired in 2002 at age 92, at which time she was the longest serving female legislator from North Carolina. She represented a district in Mecklenburg County. At the end of her time, she was ranked the seventh in effectiveness among North Carolina legislators by the North Carolina Center for Public Policy Research.

Easterling died on November 1, 2006, at age 95, of congestive heart failure.

North Carolina House of Representatives
Preceded by Laurence Arthur Cobb; William Craig Lawing; Carolyn Williamson Mathias	Member of the North Carolina House of Representatives from the 36th district 1977-1985	Succeeded by Raymond Allan Warren
Preceded by Constituency established	Member of the North Carolina House of Representatives from the 58th district 1985-2003	Succeeded by Alma Adams
