= 2002 North Carolina House of Representatives election =

- November 5, 2002

All 120 seats in the North Carolina House of Representatives 61 seats needed for a majority
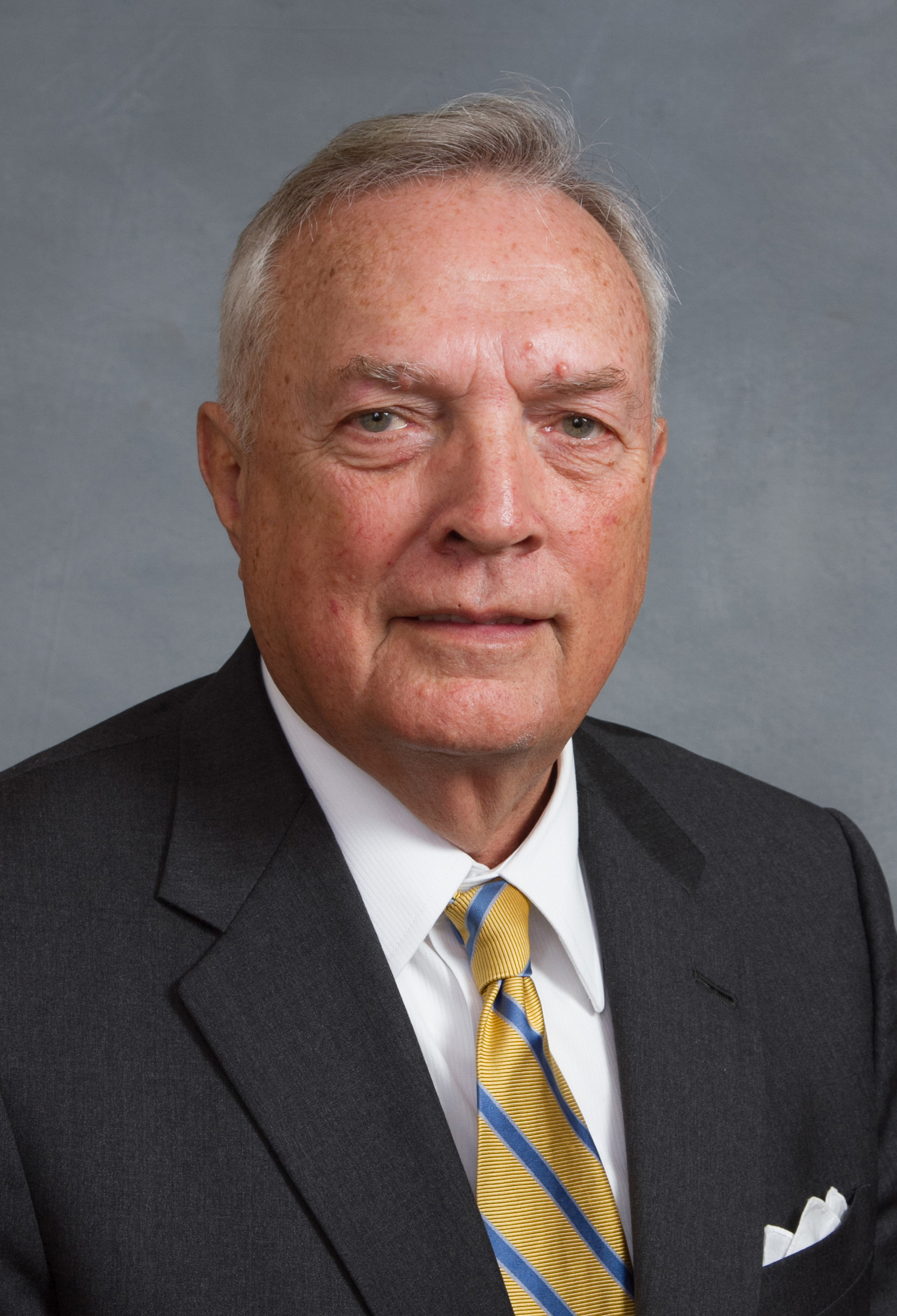

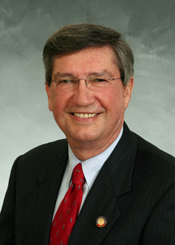
	Majority party	Minority party
Leader	Leo Daughtry	Jim Black
Party	Republican	Democratic
Leader's seat	95th District	36th District
Last election	58	62
Seats after	61	59
Seat change	▲3	▼3
Popular vote	1,072,101	903,508
Percentage	51.77%	43.63%
- Results: Republican gain Democratic gain Republican hold Democratic hold
Speaker before election
Jim Black
Democratic
Elected Speaker
Jim Black &
Richard Morgan
Coalition

The North Carolina House of Representatives election of 2002 were held on November 5, 2002, as part of the biennial election to the General Assembly. All 120 seats in the North Carolina House of Representatives were elected.

Initially, Republicans flipped control of the chamber with a 61-59 majority. However, Republican Michael P. Decker switched parties, and tied the chamber at 60-60 until the next election, when he ran as a Republican again.

== Predictions ==
Source	Ranking	As of
The Cook; Political Report	Tossup	October 4, 2002

== Results summary ==
District	Incumbent	Party	Elected	Party
1st	Bill Owens	Dem	Bill Owens	Dem
2nd	Bill Culpepper (Note: Redistricted from the 86th District.)	Dem	Bill Culpepper	Dem
3rd	Alice Graham Underhill	Dem	Michael Gorman	Rep
4th	Gene Rogers† (Note: Redistricted from the 6th District.)	Dem	Charles Elliott Johnson	Dem
5th	Howard Hunter Jr.	Dem	Howard Hunter Jr.	Dem
6th	Zeno Edwards† (Note: Redistricted from the 2nd District.)	Dem	Arthur Williams	Dem
7th	John Hall	Dem	John Hall	Dem
8th	Edith Warren	Dem	Edith Warren	Dem
9th	Marian McLawhorn	Dem	Marian McLawhorn	Dem
10th	Russell Tucker	Dem	Stephen LaRoque	Rep
11th	Phil Baddour	Dem	Louis Pate	Rep
12th	William Wainwright (Note: Redistricted from the 79th District.)	Dem	William Wainwright	Dem
13th	Jean Preston	Rep	Jean Preston	Rep
13th	Ronald Smith	Dem	Jean Preston	Rep
14th	New Seat		Keith Williams	Rep
15th	Robert Grady (Note: Redistricted from the 80th District.)	Rep	Robert Grady	Rep
16th	New Seat		Carolyn Justice	Rep
17th	David Redwine	Dem	Bonner Stiller	Rep
18th	Thomas Wright (Note: Redistricted from the 98th District.)	Dem	Thomas Wright	Dem
19th	Danny McComas (Note: Redistricted from the 13th District.)	Rep	Danny McComas	Rep
20th	Dewey Hill (Note: Redistricted from the 14th District.)	Dem	Dewey Hill	Dem
21st	Larry Bell (Note: Redistricted from the 97th District.)	Dem	Larry Bell	Dem
22nd	Edd Nye (Note: Redistricted from the 96th District.)	Dem	Edd Nye	Dem
22nd	Nurham Warwick (Note: Redistricted from the 12th District.)	Dem	Edd Nye	Dem
23rd	Joe Tolson (Note: Redistricted from the 71st District.)	Dem	Joe Tolson	Dem
24th	Shelly Willingham (Note: Redistricted from the 70th District.)	Dem	Jean Farmer-Butterfield	Dem
25th	Gene Arnold† (Note: Redistricted from the 72nd District.)	Rep	Bill Daughtridge	Rep
26th	Billy Creech (Note: Redistricted from the 20th District.)	Rep	Billy Creech	Rep
26th	Carolyn Russell (Note: Redistricted from the 77th District.)	Rep	Billy Creech	Rep
27th	Stanley Fox (Note: Redistricted from the 78th District.)	Dem	Stanley Fox	Dem
28th	Leo Daughtry (Note: Redistricted from the 95th District.)	Rep	Leo Daughtry	Rep
29th	Paul Miller (Note: Redistricted from the 23rd District.)	Dem	Paul Miller	Dem
30th	Paul Luebke (Note: Redistricted from the 23rd District.)	Dem	Paul Luebke	Dem
31st	Mickey Michaux (Note: Redistricted from the 23rd District.)	Dem	Mickey Michaux	Dem
32nd	Jim Crawford (Note: Redistricted from the 22nd District.)	Dem	Jim Crawford	Dem
33rd	Dan Blue† (Note: Redistricted from the 21st District.)	Dem	Bernard Allen	Dem
34th	Art Pope† (Note: Redistricted from the 61st District.)	Rep	Don Munford	Rep
35th	Jennifer Weiss (Note: Redistricted from the 63rd District.)	Dem	Jennifer Weiss	Dem
36th	David Miner (Note: Redistricted from the 62nd District.)	Rep	David Miner	Rep
37th	Bob Hensley† (Note: Redistricted from the 64th District.)	Dem	Paul Stam	Rep
38th	New Seat		Deborah Ross	Dem
39th	Sam Ellis (Note: Redistricted from the 15th District.)	Rep	Sam Ellis	Rep
40th	Rick Eddins (Note: Redistricted from the 65th District.)	Rep	Rick Eddins	Rep
41st	Mia Morris (Note: Redistricted from the 18th District.)	Rep	Margaret Dickson	Dem
42nd	Marvin Lucas (Note: Redistricted from the 17th District.)	Dem	Marvin Lucas	Dem
43rd	Mary McAllister (Note: Redistricted from the 17th District.)	Dem	Mary McAllister	Dem
44th	John Hurley† (Note: Redistricted from the 18th District.)	Dem	Rick Glazier	Dem
45th	Alex Warner (Note: Redistricted from the 75th District.)	Dem	Alex Warner	Dem
46th	Douglas Yongue (Note: Redistricted from the 16th District.)	Dem	Douglas Yongue	Dem
47th	Ronnie Sutton (Note: Redistricted from the 85th District.)	Dem	Ronnie Sutton	Dem
48th	Donald Bonner (Note: Redistricted from the 87th District.)	Dem	Donald Bonner	Dem
49th	New Seat		Lucy Allen	Dem
50th	Russell Capps (Note: Redistricted from the 92nd District.)	Rep	Russell Capps	Rep
51st	Leslie Cox (Note: Redistricted from the 19th District.)	Dem	John Sauls	Rep
52nd	Richard Morgan (Note: Redistricted from the 31st District.)	Rep	Richard Morgan	Rep
53rd	Donald Davis† (Note: Redistricted from the 19th District.)	Rep	David Lewis	Rep
54th	Joe Hackney (Note: Redistricted from the 24th District.)	Dem	Joe Hackney	Dem
55th	Gordon Allen (Note: Redistricted from the 22nd District.)	Dem	Gordon Allen	Dem
56th	Verla Insko (Note: Redistricted from the 24th District.)	Dem	Verla Insko	Dem
57th	Joanne Bowie (Note: Redistricted from the 29th District.)	Rep	Joanne Bowie	Rep
58th	Alma Adams (Note: Redistricted from the 26th District.)	Dem	Alma Adams	Dem
59th	Maggie Jeffus (Note: Redistricted from the 89th District.)	Dem	Maggie Jeffus	Dem
60th	New Seat		Earl Jones	Dem
61st	Mary Jarrell† (Note: Redistricted from the 89th District.)	Dem	Steve Wood	Rep
62nd	John Blust (Note: Redistricted from the 27th District.)	Rep	John Blust	Rep
62nd	Flossie Boyd-McIntyre (Note: Redistricted from the 28th District.)	Dem	John Blust	Rep
63rd	New Seat		Alice Bordsen	Dem
64th	Cary Allred (Note: Redistricted from the 25th District.)	Rep	Cary Allred	Rep
64th	W. B. Teague† (Note: Redistricted from the 25th District.)	Rep	Cary Allred	Rep
65th	Nelson Cole (Note: Redistricted from the 25th District.)	Dem	Nelson Cole	Dem
66th	Wayne Sexton (Note: Redistricted from the 73rd District.)	Rep	Wayne Sexton	Rep
67th	Arlie Culp (Note: Redistricted from the 30th District.)	Rep	Arlie Culp	Rep
68th	Wayne Goodwin (Note: Redistricted from the 32nd District.)	Dem	Wayne Goodwin	Dem
69th	Pryor Gibson (Note: Redistricted from the 33rd District.)	Dem	Pryor Gibson	Dem
70th	Bobby Barbee (Note: Redistricted from the 82nd District.)	Rep	Bobby Barbee	Rep
70th	Fern Shubert† (Note: Redistricted from the 34th District.)	Rep	Bobby Barbee	Rep
71st	Larry Womble (Note: Redistricted from the 66th District.)	Dem	Larry Womble	Dem
72nd	Warren Oldham† (Note: Redistricted from the 67th District.)	Dem	Earline Parmon	Dem
73rd	New Seat		Curtis Blackwood	Rep
74th	Linda Johnson (Note: Redistricted from the 90th District.)	Rep	Linda Johnson	Rep
75th	Jeff Barnhart (Note: Redistricted from the 81st District.)	Rep	Jeff Barnhart	Rep
76th	Eugene McCombs (Note: Redistricted from the 83rd District.)	Rep	Eugene McCombs	Rep
77th	Lorene Coates (Note: Redistricted from the 35th District.)	Dem	Lorene Coates	Dem
78th	Harold Brubaker (Note: Redistricted from the 38th District.)	Rep	Harold Brubaker	Rep
79th	Julia Craven Howard (Note: Redistricted from the 74th District.)	Rep	Julia Craven Howard	Rep
80th	Jerry Dockham (Note: Redistricted from the 94th District.)	Rep	Jerry Dockham	Rep
81st	Hugh Holliman (Note: Redistricted from the 37th District.)	Dem	Hugh Holliman	Dem
82nd	Gene Wilson (Note: Redistricted from the 40th District.)	Rep	Gene Wilson	Rep
83rd	Tracy Walker (Note: Redistricted from the 41st District.)	Rep	Tracy Walker	Rep
84th	Charles Buchanan† (Note: Redistricted from the 46th District.)	Rep	Phillip Frye	Rep
84th	Gregory Thompson† (Note: Redistricted from the 46th District.)	Rep	Phillip Frye	Rep
85th	Mitch Gillespie (Note: Redistricted from the 49th District.)	Rep	Mitch Gillespie	Rep
86th	Walt Church (Note: Redistricted from the 47th District.)	Dem	Walt Church	Dem
87th	Edgar Starnes (Note: Redistricted from the 91st District.)	Rep	Edgar Starnes	Rep
88th	Mark Hilton (Note: Redistricted from the 45th District.)	Rep	Mark Hilton	Rep
89th	Mitchell Setzer (Note: Redistricted from the 43rd District.)	Rep	Mitchell Setzer	Rep
90th	New Seat		Jim Harrell	Dem
91st	Rex Baker (Note: Redistricted from the 40th District.)	Rep	Rex Baker	Rep
91st	William Hiatt† (Note: Redistricted from the 40th District.)	Rep	Rex Baker	Rep
92nd	George Holmes (Note: Redistricted from the 41st District.)	Rep	George Holmes	Rep
93rd	Lyons Gray† (Note: Redistricted from the 39th District.)	Rep	Bill McGee	Rep
93rd	Theresa Esposito† (Note: Redistricted from the 88th District.)	Rep	Bill McGee	Rep
94th	Michael Decker (Note: Redistricted from the 84th District.)	Rep	Michael Decker	Rep
95th	New Seat		Karen Ray	Rep
96th	Frank Mitchell (Note: Redistricted from the 42nd District.)	Rep	Frank Mitchell	Rep
97th	Joe Kiser (Note: Redistricted from the 45th District.)	Rep	Joe Kiser	Rep
97th	Daniel Barefoot† (Note: Redistricted from the 44th District.)	Dem	Joe Kiser	Rep
98th	New Seat		John Rhodes	Rep
99th	Drew Saunders (Note: Redistricted from the 54th District.)	Dem	Drew Saunders	Dem
100th	Jim Black (Note: Redistricted from the 36th District.)	Dem	Jim Black	Dem
101st	Beverly Earle (Note: Redistricted from the 60th District.)	Dem	Beverly Earle	Dem
102nd	Ruth Easterling† (Note: Redistricted from the 58th District.)	Dem	Becky Carney	Dem
103rd	Jim Gulley (Note: Redistricted from the 69th District.)	Rep	Jim Gulley	Rep
104th	Connie Wilson (Note: Redistricted from the 57th District.)	Rep	Connie Wilson	Rep
105th	Ed McMahan (Note: Redistricted from the 55th District.)	Rep	Ed McMahan	Rep
106th	Martha Alexander (Note: Redistricted from the 56th District.)	Dem	Martha Alexander	Dem
107th	Pete Cunningham (Note: Redistricted from the 59th District.)	Dem	Pete Cunningham	Dem
108th	John Rayfield (Note: Redistricted from the 93rd District.)	Rep	John Rayfield	Rep
108th	Michael Harrington† (Note: Redistricted from the 76th District.)	Rep	John Rayfield	Rep
109th	New Seat		Patrick McHenry	Rep
110th	Debbie Clary (Note: Redistricted from the 48th District.)	Rep	Debbie Clary	Rep
110th	John Weatherly† (Note: Redistricted from the 48th District.)	Rep	Debbie Clary	Rep
111th	Andy Dedmon (Note: Redistricted from the 48th District.)	Dem	Tim Moore	Rep
112th	New Seat		Bob England	Dem
113th	Trudi Walend (Note: Redistricted from the 68th District.)	Rep	Trudi Walend	Rep
114th	Martin Nesbitt (Note: Redistricted from the 51st District.)	Dem	Martin Nesbitt	Dem
115th	Mark Crawford (Note: Redistricted from the 51st District.)	Rep	Bruce Goforth	Dem
116th	Wilma Sherrill (Note: Redistricted from the 51st District.)	Rep	Wilma Sherrill	Rep
117th	Larry Justus (Note: Redistricted from the 50th District.)	Rep	Larry Justus	Rep
118th	Margaret Carpenter (Note: Redistricted from the 52nd District.)	Rep	Ray Rapp	Dem
119th	Phil Haire (Note: Redistricted from the 52nd District.)	Dem	Phil Haire	Dem
120th	Roger West (Note: Redistricted from the 53rd District.)	Rep	Roger West	Rep

† - Incumbent not seeking re-election

2002 North Carolina House of Representatives election – Summary
Party	Seats	Gains	Losses	Net gain/loss	Seats %	Votes %	Votes	+/−
Republican	61					51.77	1,072,101	
Democratic						43.63	903,508	
Libertarian	0	0	0	±0	0	4.59	95,103	

== Detailed results ==
=== Districts 1-19 ===
==== District 1 ====
Incumbent Democrat Bill Owens has represented the 1st district since 1995

North Carolina House of Representatives 1st district general election, 2002
Party	Candidate	Votes	%
Democratic	Bill Owens (incumbent)	12,157	100%
Total votes		12,157	100%
Democratic hold			

==== District 2 ====
The 2nd district overlaps with much of the former 86th district. Incumbent Democrat Bill Culpepper, who has represented the 86th district since 1993, was re-elected here.

North Carolina House of Representatives 2nd district general election, 2002
Party	Candidate	Votes	%
Democratic	Bill Culpepper (incumbent)	11,867	63.45%
Republican	Daniel M. Beall	6,837	36.55%
Total votes		18,704	100%
Democratic hold			

==== District 3 ====
Incumbent Democrat Alice Graham Underhill has represented the 3rd district since 2001, she lost re-election to Republican Michael Gorman.

North Carolina House of Representatives 3rd district general election, 2002
Party	Candidate	Votes	%
Republican	Michael Gorman	10,777	50.43%
Democratic	Alice Graham Underhill (incumbent)	10,594	49.57%
Total votes		21,371	100%
Republican gain from Democratic			

==== District 4 ====
The new 4th district overlaps with much of the former 6th district. Incumbent Democrat Gene Rogers, who has represented the 6th district since 1987, didn't seek re-election. Democrat Charles Elliott Johnson won the open seat.

North Carolina House of Representatives 4th district general election, 2002
Party	Candidate	Votes	%
Democratic	Charles Elliott Johnson	9,109	51.77%
Republican	John Wobbleton	8,487	48.23%
Total votes		17,596	100%
Democratic hold			

==== District 5 ====
Incumbent Democrat Howard Hunter Jr. has represented the 5th district since 1989.

North Carolina House of Representatives 5th district general election, 2002
Party	Candidate	Votes	%
Democratic	Howard Hunter Jr. (incumbent)	12,714	84.31%
Libertarian	Larry Cooke	2,366	15.69%
Total votes		15,080	100%
Democratic hold			

==== District 6 ====
The new 6th district overlaps with much of the former 2nd district. Incumbent Democrat Zeno Edwards, who has represented the 2nd district since 1993, didn't seek re-election. Democrat Arthur Williams won the open seat.

North Carolina House of Representatives 6th district general election, 2002
Party	Candidate	Votes	%
Democratic	Arthur Williams	11,287	53.91%
Republican	Hood Richardson	9,648	46.09%
Total votes		20,935	100%
Democratic hold			

==== District 7 ====
Incumbent Democrat John Hall has represented the 7th district since his appointment on February 4, 2000. Hall was elected to his first full term.

North Carolina House of Representatives 7th district general election, 2002
Party	Candidate	Votes	%
Democratic	John Hall (incumbent)	11,941	100%
Total votes		11,941	100%
Democratic hold			

==== District 8 ====
Incumbent Democrat Edith Warren has represented the 8th district since 1999.

North Carolina House of Representatives 8th district general election, 2002
Party	Candidate	Votes	%
Democratic	Edith Warren (incumbent)	11,809	100%
Total votes		11,809	100%
Democratic hold			

==== District 9 ====
Incumbent Democrat Marian McLawhorn has represented the 9th district since 1999.

North Carolina House of Representatives District 9th district general election, 2002
Party	Candidate	Votes	%
Democratic	Marian McLawhorn (incumbent)	10,957	64.94%
Republican	Judy Eagle	5,715	33.87%
Libertarian	Deb Seksay	201	1.19%
Total votes		16,873	100%
Democratic hold			

==== District 10 ====
Incumbent Democrat Russell Tucker has represented the 10th district since 1999. He lost re-election to Republican Stephen LaRoque.

North Carolina House of Representatives 10th district general election, 2002
Party	Candidate	Votes	%
Republican	Stephen LaRoque	9,109	50.93%
Democratic	Russell Tucker (incumbent)	8,777	49.07%
Total votes		17,886	100%
Republican gain from Democratic			

==== District 11 ====
Incumbent Democrat Phil Baddour has represented the 11th district since 1993. He lost re-election to Republican Louis Pate.

North Carolina House of Representatives 11th district general election, 2002
Party	Candidate	Votes	%
Republican	Louis Pate	8,508	50.52%
Democratic	Phil Baddour (incumbent)	8,334	49.48%
Total votes		16,842	100%
Republican gain from Democratic			

==== District 12 ====
The new 12th district overlaps with much of the former 79th district. Incumbent Democrat William Wainwright, who has represented the 79th district and its predecessors since 1991, was re-elected here.

North Carolina House of Representatives 12th district general election, 2002
Party	Candidate	Votes	%
Democratic	William Wainwright (incumbent)	12,173	87.24%
Libertarian	Alan Christopher Stimson	1,781	12.76%
Total votes		13,954	100%
Democratic hold			

==== District 13 ====
The new 13th district overlaps with much of the former 4th district includes the home of incumbent Republican Jean Preston, who has represented the 4th district since 1993, and Democrat Ronald Smith, who has represented the 4th district since 1997, Preston was re-elected here.

North Carolina House of Representatives District 13th district general election, 2002
Party	Candidate	Votes	%
Republican	Jean Preston (incumbent)	12,530	56.48%
Democratic	Ronnie Smith (incumbent)	9,653	43.52%
Total votes		22,183	100%
Republican hold			

==== District 14 ====
The new 14th district is based in Onslow County and is expected to favor Republicans. Republican Keith Williams won the open seat.

North Carolina House of Representatives 14th district general election, 2002
Party	Candidate	Votes	%
Republican	Keith Williams	4,325	54.48%
Democratic	Dolores Jones Faison	3,410	42.95%
Libertarian	Cap Hayes	204	2.57%
Total votes		7,939	100%
Republican win (new seat)			

==== District 15 ====
The new 15th district overlaps with much of the former 80th district. Incumbent Republican Robert Grady, who has represented the 80th district and its predecessors since 1987, was re-elected here.

North Carolina House of Representatives 15th district general election, 2002
Party	Candidate	Votes	%
Republican	Robert Grady (incumbent)	8,988	70.81%
Democratic	Jerome Willingham	3,705	29.19%
Total votes		12,693	100%
Republican hold			

==== District 16 ====
The new 16th district includes all of Pender County and a portion of New Hanover County. Republican Carolyn Justice won the open seat.

North Carolina House of Representatives 16th district general election, 2002
Party	Candidate	Votes	%
Republican	Carolyn Justice	11,338	55.92%
Democratic	Jack C. Barnes	8,476	41.81%
Libertarian	Robert J. Smith	460	2.27%
Total votes		20,274	100%
Republican win (new seat)			

==== District 17 ====
The new 17th district overlaps with the southern portion of the old 14th district. Incumbent Democrat David Redwine, who has represented the 14th district since 1985, lost re-election here to Republican Bonner Stiller.

North Carolina House of Representatives 17th district general election, 2002
Party	Candidate	Votes	%
Republican	Bonner Stiller	10,902	49.31%
Democratic	David Redwine (incumbent)	10,733	48.54%
Libertarian	Robert Kerr	476	2.15%
Total votes		22,111	100%
Republican gain from Democratic			

==== District 18 ====
The new 18th district overlaps with much of the former 98th district. Incumbent Democrat Thomas Wright, who has represented the 98th district since 1993, was re-elected here.

North Carolina House of Representatives 18th district general election, 2002
Party	Candidate	Votes	%
Democratic	Thomas Wright (incumbent)	12,028	74.21%
Republican	Jack White	3,696	22.80%
Libertarian	Stephen Shepherd	485	2.99%
Total votes		16,209	100%
Democratic hold			

==== District 19 ====
The new 19th district overlaps with much of the former 13th district. Incumbent Republican Danny McComas, who has represented the 13th district since 1995, was re-elected here.

North Carolina House of Representatives 19th district general election, 2002
Party	Candidate	Votes	%
Republican	Danny McComas (incumbent)	20,083	88.67%
Libertarian	Ty Jacobus	2,565	11.33%
Total votes		22,648	100%
Republican hold			

=== Districts 20-39 ===
==== District 20 ====
The new 20th district overlaps with the northern portion of the former 14th district. Incumbent Democrat Dewey Hill, who has represented the 14th district since 1993, was re-elected here.

North Carolina House of Representatives 20th district general election, 2002
Party	Candidate	Votes	%
Democratic	Dewey Hill (incumbent)	14,340	82.42%
Libertarian	Richard Hollembeak	3,058	17.58%
Total votes		17,398	100%
Democratic hold			

==== District 21 ====
The new 21st district overlaps with much of the former 97th district. Incumbent Democrat Larry Bell, who has represented the 97th district since 2001, was re-elected here.

North Carolina House of Representatives 21st district general election, 2002
Party	Candidate	Votes	%
Democratic	Larry Bell (incumbent)	11,498	100%
Total votes		11,498	100%
Democratic hold			

==== District 22 ====
The new 22nd district includes the homes of incumbent Democrats Nurham Warwick, who has represented the 12th district since 1997, and Edd Nye, who has represented the 96th district and its predecessors since 1985. Warwick didn't seek re-election and Nye was re-elected here.

2002 North Carolina House of Representatives 22nd district general election, 2002
Party	Candidate	Votes	%
Democratic	Edd Nye (incumbent)	11,614	62.27%
Republican	Joy Barbour	7,038	37.73%
Total votes		18,652	100%
Democratic hold			

==== District 23 ====
The new 23rd district overlaps with much of the former 71st district. Incumbent Democrat Joe Tolson, who has represented the 71st district since 1997, was re-elected here.

North Carolina House of Representatives 23rd district general election, 2002
Party	Candidate	Votes	%
Democratic	Joe Tolson (incumbent)	9,678	53.38%
Republican	Bettie West	8,244	45.47%
Libertarian	Douglas Ellis	207	1.14%
Total votes		18,129	100%
Democratic hold			

==== District 24 ====
The new 24th district overlaps with much of the former 70th district. Incumbent Democrat Shelly Willingham, who has represented the 70th district since his appointment on January 28, 2002, ran for re-election. Willingham lost re-nomination to Democrat Jean Farmer-Butterfield, who won the general election.

North Carolina House of Representatives 24th district general election, 2002
Party	Candidate	Votes	%
Democratic	Jean Farmer-Butterfield	11,535	100%
Total votes		11,535	100%
Democratic hold			

==== District 25 ====
The new 25th district overlaps with much of the former 72nd district. Incumbent Republican Gene Arnold, who has represented the 72nd district since 1993, didn't seek re-election. Republican Bill Daughtridge won the open seat.

North Carolina House of Representatives 25th district general election, 2002
Party	Candidate	Votes	%
Republican	Bill Daughtridge	11,725	59.28%
Democratic	Mary Alice Wells	8,053	40.72%
Total votes		19,778	100%
Republican hold			

==== District 26 ====
The new 26th district includes the homes of incumbent Republicans Billy Creech, who has represented the 20th district since 1989, and Carolyn Russell, who has represented the 77th district and its predecessors since 1991. Russell retired to run for the North Carolina Senate and Creech was re-elected here.

North Carolina House of Representatives 26th district general election, 2002
Party	Candidate	Votes	%
Republican	Billy Creech (incumbent)	16,027	100%
Total votes		16,027	100%
Republican hold			

==== District 27 ====
The new 27th district overlaps with much of the former 78th district. Incumbent Democrat Stanley Fox, who has represented the 78th district since 1995, was re-elected here.

North Carolina House of Representatives 27th district general election, 2002
Party	Candidate	Votes	%
Democratic	Stanley Fox (incumbent)	13,193	100%
Total votes		13,193	100%
Democratic hold			

==== District 28 ====
The new 28th district overlaps with much of the former 95th district. Incumbent Republican Leo Daughtry, who has represented the 95th district and its predecessors since 1993, was re-elected here.

North Carolina House of Representatives 28th district general election, 2002
Party	Candidate	Votes	%
Republican	Leo Daughtry (incumbent)	15,833	100%
Total votes		15,833	100%
Republican hold			

==== District 29 ====
The new 29th district overlaps with much of the southwest portion of the former 23rd district. Incumbent Democrat Paul Miller, who has represented the 23rd district since 2001, was re-elected here.

North Carolina House of Representatives 29th district general election, 2002
Party	Candidate	Votes	%
Democratic	Paul Miller (incumbent)	15,152	100%
Total votes		15,152	100%
Democratic hold			

==== District 30 ====
The new 30th district overlaps with much of the western portion of the former 23rd district. Incumbent Democrat Paul Luebke, who has represented the 23rd district since 1991, was re-elected here.

North Carolina House of Representatives 30th district general election, 2002
Party	Candidate	Votes	%
Democratic	Paul Luebke (incumbent)	14,017	84.64%
Libertarian	Terry Mancour	2,543	15.36%
Total votes		16,560	100%
Democratic hold			

==== District 31 ====
The new 31st district overlaps with much of the eastern portion of the old 23rd district. Incumbent Democrat Mickey Michaux, who has represented the 23rd district since 1985, was re-elected here.

North Carolina House of Representatives 31st district general election, 2002
Party	Candidate	Votes	%
Democratic	Mickey Michaux (incumbent)	12,658	81.03%
Libertarian	Rachel Mills	2,963	18.97%
Total votes		15,621	100%
Democratic hold			

==== District 32 ====
The new 32nd district overlaps with much of the eastern portion of the old 22nd district. Incumbent Democrat Jim Crawford, who has represented the 22nd district since 1995, was re-elected here.

North Carolina House of Representatives 32nd district general election, 2002
Party	Candidate	Votes	%
Democratic	Jim Crawford (incumbent)	10,644	58.24%
Republican	Sallie Edwards-Pickett	6,852	37.49%
Libertarian	Barbara Howe	780	4.27%
Total votes		18,276	100%
Democratic hold			

==== District 33 ====
The new 33rd district overlaps with much of the former 21st district. Incumbent Democrat Dan Blue, who has represented the 21st district and its predecessors since 1981, retired to run for the U.S. Senate. Democrat Bernard Allen won the open seat.

North Carolina House of Representatives 33rd district general election, 2002
Party	Candidate	Votes	%
Democratic	Bernard Allen	12,940	65.88%
Republican	Venita Peyton	6,175	31.44%
Libertarian	Jesse Halliday	526	2.68%
Total votes		19,641	100%
Democratic hold			

==== District 34 ====
The new 34th district overlaps with much of the former 61st district. Incumbent Republican Art Pope, who has represented the 61st district since 1999, didn't seek re-election. Republican Don Munford won the open seat.

North Carolina House of Representatives 34th district general election, 2002
Party	Candidate	Votes	%
Republican	Don Munford	15,998	57.82%
Democratic	Cynthia Barnett	10,767	38.91%
Libertarian	Victor Marks	905	3.27%
Total votes		27,670	100%
Republican hold			

==== District 35 ====
he new 35th district overlaps with much of the former 63rd district. Incumbent Democrat Jennifer Weiss, who has represented the 63rd district since 1999, was re-elected here.

North Carolina House of Representatives 35th district general election, 2002
Party	Candidate	Votes	%
Democratic	Jennifer Weiss (incumbent)	12,907	52.82%
Republican	Darryl Black	10,757	44.02%
Libertarian	Linda Ellis	771	3.16%
Total votes		24,435	100%
Democratic hold			

==== District 36 ====
The new 36th district overlaps with much of the former 62nd district. Incumbent Republican David Miner, who has represented the 62nd district since 1993, was re-elected here.

North Carolina House of Representatives 36th district general election, 2002
Party	Candidate	Votes	%
Republican	David Miner (incumbent)	18,957	86.11%
Libertarian	Gregory A. Clayton	3,059	13.89%
Total votes		22,016	100%
Republican hold			

==== District 37 ====
The new 37th district includes the home of incumbent Democrat Bob Hensley, who has represented the 64th district since 1991. Hensley didn't seek re-election and Republican Paul Stam won the open seat.

204

North Carolina House of Representatives 37th district general election, 2002
Party	Candidate	Votes	%
Republican	Paul Stam	15,647	59.05%
Democratic	J. C. Knowles	9,700	36.61%
Libertarian	Brad Wheeler	1,152	4.35%
Total votes		26,499	100%
Republican gain from Democratic			

==== District 38 ====
The new 38th district is based in east central Wake County and has no incumbent. Democrat Deborah Ross won the open seat.

North Carolina House of Representatives 38th district general election, 2002
Party	Candidate	Votes	%
Democratic	Deborah Ross	12,566	89.68%
Libertarian	Casey Gardner	1,446	10.32%
Total votes		14,012	100%
Democratic win (new seat)			

==== District 39 ====
The new 39th district overlaps with much of the former 15th district. Incumbent Republican Sam Ellis, who has represented the 15th district since 1993, was re-elected here.

North Carolina House of Representatives 39th district general election, 2002
Party	Candidate	Votes	%
Republican	Sam Ellis (incumbent)	13,875	56.62%
Democratic	Darren Jackson	10,105	41.24%
Libertarian	H. Wade Minter	524	2.14%
Total votes		24,504	100%
Republican hold			

=== Districts 40-59 ===
==== District 40 ====
The new 40th district overlaps with much of the former 65th district. Incumbent Republican Rick Eddins, who has represented the 65th district since 1995, was re-elected here

North Carolina House of Representatives 40th district general election, 2002
Party	Candidate	Votes	%
Republican	Rick Eddins (incumbent)	18,194	85.10%
Libertarian	Scott Quint	3,186	14.90%
Total votes		21,380	100%
Republican hold			

==== District 41 ====
The new 41st district overlaps with the eastern portion of the old 18th district. Incumbent Republican Mia Morris, who has represented the 18th district since 1997, lost re-election here to Democrat Margaret Dickson.

North Carolina House of Representatives 41st district general election, 2002
Party	Candidate	Votes	%
Democratic	Margaret Dickson	8,596	50.68%
Republican	Mia Morris (incumbent)	8,365	49.32%
Total votes		16,961	100%
Democratic gain from Republican			

==== District 42 ====
The new 42nd district overlaps with much of the former 17th district. Incumbent Democrat Marvin Lucas, who has represented the 17th district since 2001, was re-elected here.

North Carolina House of Representatives 42nd district general election, 2002
Party	Candidate	Votes	%
Democratic	Marvin Lucas (incumbent)	6,845	100%
Total votes		6,845	100%
Democratic hold			

==== District 43 ====
The new 43rd district overlaps with much of the former 17th district. Incumbent Democrat Mary McAllister, who has represented the 90th district since 1991, was re-elected here.

North Carolina House of Representatives 43rd district general election, 2002
Party	Candidate	Votes	%
Democratic	Mary McAllister (incumbent)	7,008	100%
Total votes		7,008	100%
Democratic hold			

==== District 44 ====
The new 44th district overlaps with much of the former 18th district. Incumbent Democrat Bill Hurley, who has represented the 90th district since 1995, didn't seek re-election. Democrat Rick Glazier won the open seat.

North Carolina House of Representatives 44th district general election, 2002
Party	Candidate	Votes	%
Democratic	Rick Glazier	7,523	53.43%
Republican	Michael Stone	6,556	46.57%
Total votes		14,079	100%
Democratic hold			

==== District 45 ====
The new 45th district overlaps with much of the former 75th district. Incumbent Democrat Alex Warner, who has represented the 75th district and its predecessors since 1987, was re-elected here.

North Carolina House of Representatives 45th district general election, 2002
Party	Candidate	Votes	%
Democratic	Alex Warner (incumbent)	8,039	62.39%
Republican	Robert T. Lawrence	4,847	37.61%
Total votes		12,886	100%
Democratic hold			

==== District 46 ====
The new 46th district overlaps with much of the former 16th district. Incumbent Democrat Douglas Yongue, who has represented the 16th district since 1993, was re-elected here.

North Carolina House of Representatives 46th district general election, 2002
Party	Candidate	Votes	%
Democratic	Douglas Yongue (incumbent)	6,920	63.50%
Republican	C. Linwood Faulk	3,978	36.50%
Total votes		10,898	100%
Democratic hold			

==== District 47 ====
The new 47th district overlaps with much of the former 85th district. Incumbent Democrat Ronnie Sutton, who has represented the 85th district since 1993, was re-elected here.

North Carolina House of Representatives 47th district general election, 2002
Party	Candidate	Votes	%
Democratic	Ronnie Sutton (incumbent)	7,031	73.18%
Republican	Christopher Lowry	2,577	26.82%
Total votes		9,608	100%
Democratic hold			

==== District 48 ====
The new 48th district overlaps with much of the former 87th district. Incumbent Democrat Donald Bonner, who has represented the 87th district since 1997, was re-elected here.

North Carolina House of Representatives 48th district general election, 2002
Party	Candidate	Votes	%
Democratic	Donald Bonner (incumbent)	9,968	100%
Total votes		9,968	100%
Democratic hold			

==== District 49 ====
The new 49th district includes all of Franklin County, as well as portions of Warren and Halifax counties. Democrat Lucy Allen won the open seat.

North Carolina House of Representatives 49th district general election, 2002
Party	Candidate	Votes	%
Democratic	Lucy Allen	10,885	52.45%
Republican	Renee McCormick	9,288	44.75%
Libertarian	Gregg Adelman	580	2.79%
Total votes		20,753	100%
Democratic win (new seat)			

==== District 50 ====
The new 50th district overlaps with much of the former 92nd district. Incumbent Republican Russell Capps, who has represented the 92nd district since 1995, was re-elected here.

North Carolina House of Representatives 50th district general election, 2002
Party	Candidate	Votes	%
Republican	Russell Capps (incumbent)	19,636	80.85%
Libertarian	Lee Griffin	4,650	19.15%
Total votes		24,286	100%
Republican hold			

==== District 51 ====
The new 51st district overlaps with much of the western portion of the former 19th district. Incumbent Democrat Leslie Cox, who has represented the 19th district since 1999, lost re-election here to Republican John Sauls.

North Carolina House of Representatives 51st district general election, 2002
Party	Candidate	Votes	%
Republican	John Sauls	8,500	51.14%
Democratic	Leslie Cox (incumbent)	7,819	47.04%
Libertarian	Mark Jackson	302	1.82%
Total votes		16,621	100%
Republican gain from Democratic			

==== District 52 ====
The new 52nd district overlaps with much of the former 31st district. Incumbent Republican Richard Morgan, who has represented the 31st district since 1991, was re-elected here.

North Carolina House of Representatives 52nd district general election, 2002
Party	Candidate	Votes	%
Republican	Richard Morgan (incumbent)	14,477	85.57%
Libertarian	Todd Unkefer	2,442	14.43%
Total votes		16,919	100%
Republican hold			

==== District 53 ====
The new 53rd district overlaps with the eastern portion of the former 19th district. Incumbent Republican Don Davis, who has represented the 19th district since 1995, didn't seek re-election. Republican David Lewis won the open seat.

North Carolina House of Representatives 53rd district general election, 2002
Party	Candidate	Votes	%
Republican	David Lewis	9,672	61.77%
Democratic	Larry C. Upchurch	5,987	38.23%
Total votes		15,659	100%
Republican hold			

==== District 54 ====
The new 54th district overlaps with southern portion of the former 24th district. Incumbent Democrat Joe Hackney, who has represented the 24th district and its predecessors since 1981, was re-elected here.

North Carolina House of Representatives 54th district general election, 2002
Party	Candidate	Votes	%
Democratic	Joe Hackney (incumbent)	18,508	86.22%
Libertarian	Frederick Blackburn	2,957	13.78%
Total votes		21,465	100%
Democratic hold			

==== District 55 ====
The new 55th district overlaps with much of the western portion of the former 22nd district. Incumbent Democrat Gordon Allen, who has represented the 22nd district since 1997, was re-elected here.

North Carolina House of Representatives 55th district general election, 2002
Party	Candidate	Votes	%
Democratic	Gordon Allen (incumbent)	11,712	55.40%
Republican	Kathy Hartkopf	9,427	44.60%
Total votes		21,139	100%
Democratic hold			

==== District 56 ====
The new 56th district overlaps with the northern portion with the 24th district. Incumbent Democrat Verla Insko, who has represented the 24th district since 1997, was re-elected here.

North Carolina House of Representatives 56th district general election, 2002
Party	Candidate	Votes	%
Democratic	Verla Insko (incumbent)	15,805	79.98%
Libertarian	Will Shooter	3,957	20.02%
Total votes		19,762	100%
Democratic hold			

==== District 57 ====
The new 57th district overlaps with much of the former 29th district. Incumbent Republican Joanne Bowie, who has represented the 29th district and its predecessor since 1989, was re-elected here.

North Carolina House of Representatives 57th district general election, 2002
Party	Candidate	Votes	%
Republican	Joanne Bowie (incumbent)	20,388	84.41%
Libertarian	Walter Sperko	3,766	15.59%
Total votes		24,154	100%
Republican hold			

==== District 58 ====
The new 58th district overlaps with much of the former 26th district. Incumbent Democrat Alma Adams, who has represented the 26th district since 1994, was re-elected here.

North Carolina House of Representatives 58th district general election, 2002
Party	Candidate	Votes	%
Democratic	Alma Adams (incumbent)	14,054	85.83%
Libertarian	David Williams	2,320	14.17%
Total votes		16,374	100%
Democratic hold			

==== District 59 ====
The new 59th district overlaps with much of the former 89th district. Incumbent Democrat Maggie Jeffus, who has represented the 89th district and its predecessors since 1991, was re-elected here.

North Carolina House of Representatives 59th district general election, 2002
Party	Candidate	Votes	%
Democratic	Maggie Jeffus (incumbent)	12,175	54.39%
Republican	Alan Hawkes	9,553	42.68%
Libertarian	Allison Jaynes	656	2.93%
Total votes		22,384	100%
Democratic hold			

=== Districts 60-79 ===
==== District 60 ====
The new 60th district is based in Guilford County and is expected to favor Democrats. Democrat Earl Jones won the open seat.

North Carolina House of Representatives 60th district general election, 2002
Party	Candidate	Votes	%
Democratic	Earl Jones	11,131	83.81%
Libertarian	Dan Groome	2,151	16.19%
Total votes		13,282	100%
Democratic win (new seat)			

==== District 61 ====
The new 61st district includes the home of incumbent Democrat Mary Jarrell, who has represented the 89th district since 1997. Jarrell didn't seek re-election and Republican Steve Wood won the open seat.

North Carolina House of Representative 61st district general election, 2002
Party	Candidate	Votes	%
Republican	Steve Wood	16,769	79.16%
Libertarian	Jennifer Schulz Medlock	4,415	20.84%
Total votes		21,184	100%
Republican gain from Democratic			

==== District 62 ====
The new 62nd district includes the homes of incumbent Republican John Blust, who has represented the 27th district since 2001, and incumbent Democrat Flossie Boyd-McIntyre, who has represented the 28th district since 1993. Blust was re-elected here.

North Carolina House of Representatives 62nd district general election, 2002
Party	Candidate	Votes	%
Republican	John Blust (incumbent)	13,060	62.06%
Democratic	Flossie Boyd-McIntyre (incumbent)	7,983	37.94%
Total votes		21,043	100%
Republican hold			

==== District 63 ====
The new 63rd district is based in Alamance County and isn't safe for either party. Democrat Alice Bordsen won the open seat.

North Carolina House of Representatives 63rd district general election, 2002
Party	Candidate	Votes	%
Democratic	Alice Bordsen	7,914	50.31%
Republican	Robert E. "Rob" Sharpe Jr.	7,817	49.69%
Total votes		15,731	100%
Democratic win (new seat)			

==== District 64 ====
The new 64th district overlaps with much of the southern portion of the former 25th district. The new district includes the homes of incumbent Republicans Cary Allred, who has represented the 25th district since 1995, and W. B. Teague, who has represented the 25th district since 1999. Allred was re-elected here.

North Carolina House of Representatives 64th district general election, 2002
Party	Candidate	Votes	%
Republican	Cary Allred (incumbent)	13,901	100%
Total votes		13,901	100%
Republican hold			

==== District 65 ====
The new 65th district overlaps with much of the northern portion of the former 25th district. Incumbent Democrat Nelson Cole, who has represented the 25th district since 1997, was re-elected here.

North Carolina House of Representatives 65th district general election, 2002
Party	Candidate	Votes	%
Democratic	Nelson Cole (incumbent)	13,465	100%
Total votes		13,465	100%
Democratic hold			

==== District 66 ====
The new 66th district overlaps with much of the former 73rd district. Incumbent Republican Wayne Sexton, who has represented the 73rd district since 1993, was re-elected here.

North Carolina House of Representatives 66th district general election, 2002
Party	Candidate	Votes	%
Republican	Wayne Sexton (incumbent)	14,180	100%
Total votes		14,180	100%
Republican hold			

==== District 67 ====
The new 67th district overlaps with much of the former 30th district. Incumbent Republican Arlie Culp, who has represented the 30th district since 1989, was re-elected here

North Carolina House of Representatives 67th district general election, 2002
Party	Candidate	Votes	%
Republican	Arlie Culp (incumbent)	10,481	68.13%
Democratic	Mary Tate Blake	4,902	31.87%
Total votes		15,383	100%
Republican hold			

==== District 68 ====
The new 68th district overlaps with much of the former 32nd district. Incumbent Democrat Wayne Goodwin, who has represented the 32nd district since 1997, was re-elected here

North Carolina House of Representatives 68th district general election, 2002
Party	Candidate	Votes	%
Democratic	Wayne Goodwin (incumbent)	10,393	55.86%
Republican	George E. Crump III	7,833	42.10%
Libertarian	David Muse	381	2.05%
Total votes		18,607	100%
Democratic hold			

==== District 69 ====
The new 69th district overlaps with much of the former 33rd district. Incumbent Democrat Pryor Gibson, who has represented the 33rd district since 1999, was re-elected here.

North Carolina House of Representatives 69th district general election, 2002
Party	Candidate	Votes	%
Democratic	Pryor Gibson (incumbent)	11,749	64.75%
Republican	Frank D. Hill	6,064	33.42%
Libertarian	Alan Light	332	1.83%
Total votes		18,145	100%
Democratic hold			

==== District 70 ====
The new 70th district includes the homes of incumbent Republicans Fern Shubert, who has represented the 34th district since 2001, and Bobby Barbee, who has represented the 82nd district and its predecessors since 1987. Shubert retired to run for the North Carolina Senate and Barbee was re-elected here.

North Carolina House of Representatives 70th district general election, 2002
Party	Candidate	Votes	%
Republican	Bobby Barbee (incumbent)	8,993	50.68%
Democratic	Max Melton	8,751	49.32%
Total votes		17,744	100%
Republican hold			

==== District 71 ====
The new 71st district overlaps with much of the former 66th district. Incumbent Democrat Larry Womble, who has represented the 66th district since 1995, was re-elected here.

North Carolina House of Representatives 71st district general election, 2002
Party	Candidate	Votes	%
Democratic	Larry Womble (incumbent)	9,662	66.11%
Republican	Mac Weatherman	4,571	31.28%
Libertarian	Lynn Haggerty	382	2.61%
Total votes		14,615	100%
Democratic hold			

==== District 72 ====
The new 72nd district overlaps with much of the former 67th district. Incumbent Democrat Warren Oldham, who has represented the 67th district since 1991, didn't seek re-election. Democrat Earline Parmon won the open seat.

North Carolina House of Representatives 72nd district general election, 2002
Party	Candidate	Votes	%
Democratic	Earline Parmon	8,183	54.78%
Republican	Vernon Robinson	6,754	45.22%
Total votes		14,937	100%
Democratic hold			

==== District 73 ====
The new 73rd district includes part of Union County and has no incumbent. Republican Curtis Blackwood won the open seat.

North Carolina House of Representatives 73rd district general election, 2002
Party	Candidate	Votes	%
Republican	Curtis Blackwood	17,477	100%
Total votes		17,477	100%
Republican win (new seat)			

==== District 74 ====
The new 74th district overlaps with much of the former 90th district. Incumbent Republican Linda Johnson, who has represented the 90th district since 2001, was re-elected here.

North Carolina House of Representatives 74th district general section, 2002
Party	Candidate	Votes	%
Republican	Linda Johnson (incumbent)	12,835	65.24%
Democratic	Glenn White	6,243	1.73%
Libertarian	Caroline Gellner	596	3.03%
Total votes		19,674	100%
Republican hold			

==== District 75 ====
The new 75th district overlaps with much of the former 81st district. Incumbent Republican Jeff Barnahrt, who has represented the 81st district since 2001, was re-elected here.

North Carolina House of Representatives 75th district general election, 2002
Party	Candidate	Votes	%
Republican	Jeff Barnhart (incumbent)	11,289	59.30%
Democratic	Wayne Troutman	7,747	40.70%
Total votes		19,036	100%
Republican hold			

==== District 76 ====
The new 76th district overlaps with much of the former 83rd district. Incumbent Republican Eugene McCombs, who has represented the 83rd district since 1993, was re-elected here.

North Carolina House of Representatives 76th district general election, 2002
Party	Candidate	Votes	%
Republican	Eugene McCombs (incumbent)	14,703	100%
Total votes		14,703	100%
Republican hold			

==== District 77 ====
The new 77th district overlaps with much of the former 35th district. Incumbent Democrat Lorene Coates, who has represented the 35th district since 2001, was re-elected here.

North Carolina House of Representatives 77th district general election, 2002
Party	Candidate	Votes	%
Democratic	Lorene Coates (incumbent)	9,886	55.02%
Republican	Charlotte A. Gardner	8,081	44.98%
Total votes		7,967	100%
Democratic hold			

==== District 78 ====
The new 78th district overlaps with much of the former 38th district. Incumbent Republican Harold Brubaker, who has represented the 38th district and its predecessors since 1977, was re-elected here.

North Carolina House of Representatives 78th district general election, 2002
Party	Candidate	Votes	%
Republican	Harold Brubaker (incumbent)	13,059	90.74%
Libertarian	Don Blair	1,332	9.26%
Total votes		14,391	100%
Republican hold			

==== District 79 ====
The new 79th district overlaps with much of the former 74th district. Incumbent Republican Julia Craven Howard, who has represented the 74th district and its predecessors since 1989, was re-elected here.

North Carolina House of Representatives 79th district general election, 2002
Party	Candidate	Votes	%
Republican	Julia Craven Howard (incumbent)	15,412	86.70%
Libertarian	Mike Holland	2,364	13.30%
Total votes		17,776	100%
Republican hold			

=== Districts 80-99 ===
==== District 80 ====
The new 80th District overlaps with much of the former 94th district. Incumbent Republican Jerry Dockham, who has represented the 94th district and its predecessors since 1991, was re-elected here.

North Carolina House of Representatives 80th district general election, 2002
Party	Candidate	Votes	%
Republican	Jerry Dockham (incumbent)	15,662	100%
Total votes		15,662	100%
Republican hold			

==== District 81 ====
The new 81st district overlaps with much of the former 37th district. Incumbent Democrat Hugh Holliman, who has represented the 37th district since 2001, was re-elected here.

North Carolina House of Representatives 81st district general election, 2002
Party	Candidate	Votes	%
Democratic	Hugh Holliman (incumbent)	9,074	53.20%
Republican	John T. Walser Jr.	7,540	44.21%
Libertarian	Stuart Britt	442	2.59%
Total votes		17,056	100%
Democratic hold			

==== District 82 ====
The new 82nd district overlaps with much of the western portion of the former 40th district. Incumbent Republican Gene Wilson, who has represented the 40th district since 1995, was re-elected here.

North Carolina House of Representatives 82nd district general election, 2002
Party	Candidate	Votes	%
Republican	Gene Wilson (incumbent)	13,989	58.33%
Democratic	Dan Hense	9,056	37.76%
Libertarian	Jeff Cannon	937	3.91%
Total votes		23,982	100%
Republican hold			

==== District 83 ====
The new 83rd district overlaps with much of the western portion of the former 41st district. Incumbent Republican Tracy Walker, who has represented the 41st district since 2001, was re-elected here.

North Carolina House of Representatives 83rd district general election, 2002
Party	Candidate	Votes	%
Republican	Tracy Walker (incumbent)	12,976	64.58%
Democratic	Robert T. Johnston	6,472	32.21%
Libertarian	Pat Kingsbury	646	3.21%
Total votes		20,094	100%
Republican hold			

==== District 84 ====
The new 84th district overlaps with much of the former 46th district. Incumbent Republicans Charles Buchanan and Gregory Thompson, who have represented the 46th district since 1995 and 1993 respectively, were both redistricted here. Thompson retired to run for the North Carolina Senate. Phillip Frye defeated Buchanan in the Republican primary and easily won the general election.

North Carolina House of Representatives 84th district general election, 2002
Party	Candidate	Votes	%
Republican	Phillip Frye	14,422	84.14%
Libertarian	Jeff Young	2,719	15.86%
Total votes		17,141	100%
Republican hold			

==== District 85 ====
The new 85th district overlaps with much of the former 49th district. Incumbent Republican Mitch Gillespie, who has represented the 49th district since 1999, was re-elected here.

North Carolina House of Representatives 85th district general election, 2002
Party	Candidate	Votes	%
Republican	Mitch Gillespie (incumbent)	10,318	58.16%
Democratic	A. Everette Clark	7,424	41.84%
Total votes		17,742	100%
Republican hold			

==== District 86 ====
The new 86th district overlaps with much of the former 47th district. Incumbent Democrat Walt Church, who has represented the 47th district since 1993, was re-elected here.

North Carolina House of Representatives 86th district general election, 2002
Party	Candidate	Votes	%
Democratic	Walt Church (incumbent)	11,586	59.10%
Republican	Earl A. Cook	8,019	40.90%
Total votes		19,605	100%
Democratic hold			

==== District 87 ====
The new 87th district overlaps with much of the former 91st district. Incumbent Republican Edgar Starnes, who has represented the 91st district since 1997, was re-elected here.

North Carolina House of Representatives 87th district general election, 2002
Party	Candidate	Votes	%
Republican	Edgar Starnes (incumbent)	11,813	51.48%
Democratic	Ray Warren	11,132	48.52%
Total votes		22,945	100%
Republican hold			

==== District 88 ====
The new 88th district overlaps with much of the northern portion of the former 45th district. Incumbent Republican Mark Hilton, who has represented the 45th district since 2001, was re-elected here.

North Carolina House of Representatives 88th district general election, 2002
Party	Candidate	Votes	%
Republican	Mark Hilton (incumbent)	12,549	100%
Total votes		12,549	100%
Republican hold			

==== District 89 ====
The new 89th district overlaps with much of the former 43rd district. Incumbent Republican Mitchell Setzer, who has represented the 43rd district since 1999, was re-elected here.

North Carolina House of Representatives 89th district general election, 2002
Party	Candidate	Votes	%
Republican	Mitchell Setzer (incumbent)	12,912	85.97%
Libertarian	Barry Woodfin	2,107	14.03%
Total votes		15,019	100%
Republican hold			

==== District 90 ====
The new 90th district includes all of Alleghany County as well as part of Surry County. The new district has no incumbent. Democrat Jim Harrell won the open seat.

North Carolina House of Representatives 90th district general election, 2002
Party	Candidate	Votes	%
Democratic	Jim Harrell	9,395	52.75%
Republican	R. F. Buck Golding	8,415	47.25%
Total votes		17,810	100%
Democratic win (new seat)			

==== District 91 ====
The new 91st district overlaps with much of the eastern portion of the former 40th district. The district includes the homes of incumbent Republicans Rex Baker, who has represented the 40th district since 1995, and William Hiatt, who has represented the 40th district since 1995. Hiatt didn't seek re-election and Baker was re-elected here.

North Carolina House of Representatives 91st district general election, 2002
Party	Candidate	Votes	%
Republican	Rex Baker (incumbent)	10,548	56.81%
Democratic	Robert W. Mitchell	8,019	43.19%
Total votes		18,567	100%
Republican hold			

==== District 92 ====
The new 92nd district overlaps with much of the eastern portion of the former 41st district. Incumbent Republican George Holmes, who has represented the 41st district and its predecessors since 1979, was re-elected here.

North Carolina House of Representatives 92nd district general election, 2002
Party	Candidate	Votes	%
Republican	George Holmes (incumbent)	16,881	86.59%
Libertarian	Adam Wilson	2,614	13.41%
Total votes		19,495	100%
Republican hold			

==== District 93 ====
The new 93rd district includes the homes of incumbent Republicans Lyons Gray, who has represented the 39th district since 1989, and Theresa Esposito, who has represented the 88th district and its predecessors since 1985, didn't seek re-election. Neither Gray nor Esposito sought re-election. Republican Bill McGee won the open seat.

North Carolina House of Representatives 93rd district general election, 2002
Party	Candidate	Votes	%
Republican	Bill McGee	15,591	62.74%
Democratic	Becky Johnson	8,698	35.00%
Libertarian	Kevin Fortner	562	2.26%
Total votes		24,851	100%
Republican hold			

==== District 94 ====
the new 94th District overlaps with much of the former 84th district. Incumbent Republican Michael Decker, who has represented the 84th district and its predecessors since 1985, was re-elected here.

North Carolina House of Representatives 94th district general election, 2002
Party	Candidate	Votes	%
Republican	Michael Decker (incumbent)	17,110	84.96%
Libertarian	Ed Topolski	3,029	15.04%
Total votes		20,139	100%
Republican hold			

==== District 95 ====
The new 95th district contains the southern portions of Catawba and Iredell counties and had no incumbent. Republican Karen Ray won the open seat.

North Carolina House of Representatives 95th district general election, 2002
Party	Candidate	Votes	%
Republican	Karen Ray	14,613	100%
Total votes		14,613	100%
Republican win (new seat)			

==== District 96 ====
The new 96th district overlaps with much of the former 42nd district. Incumbent Republican Franklin Mitchell, who has represented the 42nd district since 1993, was re-elected here.

North Carolina House of Representatives 96th district general election, 2002
Party	Candidate	Votes	%
Republican	Frank Mitchell (incumbent)	9,822	58.16%
Democratic	Bill McMillan	6,784	40.17%
Libertarian	Kyle Klock	282	1.67%
Total votes		16,888	100%
Republican hold			

==== District 97 ====
The new 97th district includes the homes of incumbent Republican Joe Kiser, who has represented the 45th district since 1995, and incumbent Democrat Daniel Barefoot, who has represented the 44th district since 1999. Barefoot didn't seek re-election and Kiser was re-elected here.

North Carolina House of Representatives 97th district general election, 2002
Party	Candidate	Votes	%
Republican	Joe Kiser (incumbent)	11,859	58.51%
Democratic	Floyd E. Mason	7,760	38.29%
Libertarian	Bryan Edwards	650	3.21%
Total votes		20,269	100%
Republican hold			

==== District 98 ====
The new 98th district is based in the northern portion of Mecklenburg County and has no incumbent. Republican John Rhodes won the open seat.

North Carolina House of Representatives 98th district general election, 2002
Party	Candidate	Votes	%
Republican	John Rhodes	13,661	57.92%
Democratic	David H. Dunn	9,927	42.08%
Total votes		23,588	100%
Republican win (new seat)			

==== District 99 ====
The new 99th district overlaps with much of the former 54th district. Incumbent Democrat Drew Saunders, who has represented the 54th district since 1997, was re-elected here.

North Carolina House of Representatives 99th district general election, 2002
Party	Candidate	Votes	%
Democratic	Drew Saunders (incumbent)	10,636	100%
Total votes		10,636	100%
Democratic hold			

=== Districts 100-120 ===
==== District 100 ====
The new 100th district overlaps with much of the former 36th district. Incumbent Speaker of the House Jim Black, who has represented the 36th district since 1991 and previously from 1981 to 1985, was re-elected here.

North Carolina House of Representatives 100th district general election, 2002
Party	Candidate	Votes	%
Democratic	Jim Black (incumbent)	8,450	60.87%
Republican	Nick Cicali	5,432	39.13%
Total votes		13,882	100%
Democratic hold			

==== District 101 ====
The new 101st district overlaps with much of the former 60th district. Incumbent Democrat Beverly Earle, who has represented the 60th district since 1995, was re-elected here.

North Carolina House of Representatives 101st district general election, 2002
Party	Candidate	Votes	%
Democratic	Beverly Earle (incumbent)	12,093	100%
Total votes		12,093	100%
Democratic hold			

==== District 102 ====
The new 102nd district overlaps with much of the former 58th district. Incumbent Democrat Ruth Easterling, who has represented the 58th district and its predecessors since 1977, didn't seek re-election. Democrat Becky Carney won the open seat.

North Carolina House of Representatives 102nd district general election, 2002
Party	Candidate	Votes	%
Democratic	Becky Carney	10,923	91.00%
Libertarian	Daniel Elmaleh	1,080	9.00%
Total votes		12,003	100%
Democratic hold			

==== District 103 ====
The new 103rd district overlaps with much of the former 69th district. Incumbent Republican Jim Gulley, who has represented the 69th district since 1997, was re-elected here.

North Carolina House of Representatives 103rd district general election, 2002
Party	Candidate	Votes	%
Republican	Jim Gulley (incumbent)	17,254	90.24%
Libertarian	Andy Grum	1,866	9.76%
Total votes		19,120	100%
Republican hold			

==== District 104 ====
The new 104th district overlaps with much of the former 57th district. Incumbent Republican Connie Wilson, who has represented the 57th district since 1993, was re-elected here.

North Carolina House of Representatives 104th district general election, 2002
Party	Candidate	Votes	%
Republican	Connie Wilson (incumbent)	20,983	89.53%
Libertarian	Ryan Murphy	2,453	10.47%
Total votes		23,436	100%
Republican hold			

==== District 105 ====
The new 105th district overlaps with much of the former 55th district. Incumbent Republican Ed McMahan, who has represented the 105th district since 1995, was re-elected here.

North Carolina House of Representatives 105th district general election, 2002
Party	Candidate	Votes	%
Republican	Ed McMahan (incumbent)	17,970	89.78%
Libertarian	Sean Johnson	2,046	10.22%
Total votes		20,016	100%
Republican hold			

==== District 106 ====
The new 106th district overlaps with much of the former 56th district. Incumbent Democrat Martha Alexander, who has represented the 56th district since 1993, was re-elected here

North Carolina House of Representatives 106th district general election, 2002
Party	Candidate	Votes	%
Democratic	Martha Alexander (incumbent)	11,822	100%
Total votes		11,822	100%
Democratic hold			

==== District 107 ====
The new 107th district overlaps with much of the former 59th district. Incumbent Democrat Pete Cunningham, who has represented the 59th district since 1987, was re-elected here.

North Carolina House of Representatives District 107th district general election, 2002
Party	Candidate	Votes	%
Democratic	Pete Cunningham (incumbent)	11,490	100%
Total votes		11,490	100%
Democratic hold			

==== District 108 ====
The new 108th district includes the homes of incumbent Republicans John Rayfield, who has represented the 93rd district since 1995, and Michael Harrington, who has represented the 76th district since 2001. Harrington retired to run for the North Carolina Senate and Rayfield was re-elected here.

North Carolina House of Representatives 108th district general election, 2002
Party	Candidate	Votes	%
Republican	John Rayfield (incumbent)	12,196	84.26%
Libertarian	John Covington	2,278	15.74%
Total votes		14,474	100%
Republican hold			

==== District 109 ====
The new 109th district includes part of Gaston County and has no incumbent. Republican Patrick McHenry won the open seat.

North Carolina House of Representatives 109th district general election, 2002
Party	Candidate	Votes	%
Republican	Patrick McHenry	7,643	54.37%
Democratic	John Eaker	6,093	43.34%
Libertarian	David Secrist	321	2.28%
Total votes		14,057	100%
Republican win (new seat)			

==== District 110 ====
The new 110th district includes the homes of incumbent Republicans Debbie Clary, who has represented the 48th district since 1995, and incumbent Republican John Weatherly, who has represented the 48th district since 1993. Weatherly retired to run for the North Carolina Senate and Clary was re-elected here.

North Carolina House of Representatives 110th district general election, 2002
Party	Candidate	Votes	%
Republican	Debbie Clary (incumbent)	11,402	100%
Total votes		11,402	100%
Republican hold			

==== District 111 ====
The new 111th district includes the home of incumbent Democrat Andy Dedmon, who has represented the 48th district since 1997. Dedmon lost re-election here by Republican Tim Moore.

North Carolina House of Representatives 111th district general election, 2002
Party	Candidate	Votes	%
Republican	Tim Moore	9,790	52.97%
Democratic	Andy Dedmon (incumbent)	8,693	47.03%
Total votes		18,483	100%
Republican gain from Democratic			

==== District 112 ====
The new 112th district includes all of Rutherford County and a portion of Cleveland County. The new district had no incumbent and was won by Democrat Bob England.

North Carolina House of Representatives 112th district general election, 2002
Party	Candidate	Votes	%
Democratic	Bob England	11,215	57.90%
Republican	David Rogers	7,817	40.36%
Libertarian	Ralph Haulk	338	1.74%
Total votes		19,370	100%
Democratic win (new seat)			

==== District 113 ====
The new 113th district overlaps with much of the former 68th district. Incumbent Republican Trudi Walend, who has represented the 68th district since 1999, was re-elected here.

North Carolina House of Representatives 113th district general election, 2002
Party	Candidate	Votes	%
Republican	Trudi Walend (incumbent)	17,472	83.96%
Libertarian	Jean Marlowe	3,338	16.04%
Total votes		20,810	100%
Republican hold			

==== District 114 ====
The new 114th District overlaps with a portion of the former 51st district. Incumbent Democrat Martin Nesbitt, who has represented the 51st district and its predecessors since 1979, was re-elected here.

North Carolina House of Representatives 114th district general election, 2002
Party	Candidate	Votes	%
Democratic	Martin Nesbitt (incumbent)	12,516	60.95%
Republican	Bill Porter	7,097	34.56%
Libertarian	Clarence Young	921	4.49%
Total votes		20,534	100%
Democratic hold			

==== District 115 ====
The new 115th district overlaps with much of the southeastern portion of the 51st district. Incumbent Republican Mark Crawford, who has represented the 51st district since 2001, lost re-election here to Democrat Bruce Goforth.

2002 North Carolina House of Representatives 115th district general election, 2002
Party	Candidate	Votes	%
Democratic	Bruce Goforth	11,320	50.70%
Republican	Mark Crawford (incumbent)	10,405	46.60%
Libertarian	Robert Parker	601	2.69%
Total votes		22,326	100%
Democratic gain from Republican			

==== District 116 ====
The new 116th district overlaps with much of the southwestern portion of the old 51st district. Incumbent Republican Wilma Sherrill, who has represented the 51st district since 1995, was re-elected here.

North Carolina House of Representatives 116th district general election, 2002
Party	Candidate	Votes	%
Republican	Wilma Sherrill (incumbent)	13,470	100%
Total votes		13,470	100%
Republican hold			

==== District 117 ====
The new 117th district overlaps with much of the former 50th district. Incumbent Republican Larry Justus, who has represented the 50th district since 1985, was re-elected here.

North Carolina House of Representatives 117th district general election, 2002
Party	Candidate	Votes	%
Republican	Larry Justus (incumbent)	17,043	89.00%
Libertarian	Brian Barber	2,107	11.00%
Total votes		19,150	100%
Republican hold			

==== District 118 ====
The new 118th district overlaps with much of the northern portion of the former 52nd district. Incumbent Republican Margaret Carpenter, who has represented the 52nd district since 2001, lost re-election here to Democrat Ray Rapp.

North Carolina House of Representatives 118th district general election, 2002
Party	Candidate	Votes	%
Democratic	Ray Rapp	13,717	53.34%
Republican	Margaret Carpenter (incumbent)	11,476	44.62%
Libertarian	Barry Williams	525	2.04%
Total votes		25,718	100%
Democratic gain from Republican			

==== District 119 ====
The new 119th district overlaps with much of the southern portion of the former 52nd district. Incumbent Democrat Phil Haire, who has represented the 52nd district since 1999, was re-elected here.

North Carolina House of Representatives 119th district general election, 2002
Party	Candidate	Votes	%
Democratic	Phil Haire (incumbent)	11,238	55.05%
Republican	Kaye Matthews	9,175	44.95%
Total votes		20,413	100%
Democratic hold			

==== District 120 ====
The new 120th district overlaps with much of the former 53rd district. Incumbent Republican Roger West, who has represented the 53rd district since 2000, was re-elected here.

North Carolina House of Representatives 120th district general election, 2002
Party	Candidate	Votes	%
Republican	Roger West (incumbent)	17,968	100%
Total votes		17,968	100%
Republican hold			

== See also ==
- List of North Carolina state legislatures
