= North Carolina's 23rd House district =

American legislative district

North Carolina's 23rd State House of Representatives district
Representative
Shelly Willingham; D–Rocky Mount
- Demographics: 39% White; 53% Black; 5% Hispanic; 3% Multiracial
- Population (2024): 87,550

North Carolina's 23rd House district is one of 120 districts in the North Carolina House of Representatives. It has been represented by Democrat Shelly Willingham since 2015.

== Geography ==
Since 2023, the district has included all of Edgecombe, Martin, and Bertie counties. The district overlaps with the 1st, 2nd, and 5th Senate districts.

== District officeholders ==
=== Multi-member district ===
Representative	Party	Dates	Notes	Representative	Party	Dates	Notes	Representative	Party	Dates	Notes	Representative	Party	Dates	Notes	Representative	Party	Dates	Notes	Representative	Party	Dates	Notes	Representative	Party	Dates	Notes	Counties
District created January 1, 1967.
Norwood Bryan Jr. (Fayetteville)	Democratic	January 1, 1967 – January 1, 1973	Redistricted to the 20th district.	Sneed High (Fayetteville)	Democratic	January 1, 1967 – January 1, 1969		Joseph Raynor Jr. (Fayetteville)	Democratic	January 1, 1967 – January 1, 1973	Redistricted from the Cumberland County district.	Isaac O'Hanlon (Fayetteville)	Democratic	January 1, 1967 – January 1, 1969	Redistricted from the Cumberland County district.													1967–1973; All of Cumberland County.
Norwood Bryan Jr. (Fayetteville)	Democratic	January 1, 1967 – January 1, 1973	Redistricted to the 20th district.	Lester Carter Jr. (Fayetteville)	Democratic	January 1, 1969 – January 1, 1971		Joseph Raynor Jr. (Fayetteville)	Democratic	January 1, 1967 – January 1, 1973	Redistricted from the Cumberland County district.	Charles Rose Jr. (Fayetteville)	Democratic	January 1, 1969 – January 1, 1971														1967–1973; All of Cumberland County.
Norwood Bryan Jr. (Fayetteville)	Democratic	January 1, 1967 – January 1, 1973	Redistricted to the 20th district.	Sneed High (Fayetteville)	Democratic	January 1, 1971 – January 1, 1973	Redistricted to the 20th district.	Joseph Raynor Jr. (Fayetteville)	Democratic	January 1, 1967 – January 1, 1973	Redistricted from the Cumberland County district.	Glenn Jernigan (Fayetteville)	Democratic	January 1, 1971 – January 1, 1973	Redistricted to the 20th district.													1967–1973; All of Cumberland County.
Henry Frye (Greensboro)	Democratic	January 1, 1973 – January 1, 1981	Redistricted from the 26th district. Retired to run for State Senate.	Tom Gilmore (Greensboro)	Democratic	January 1, 1973 – January 2, 1978	Resigned.	Charlie Phillips (Greensboro)	Democratic	January 1, 1973 – January 1, 1977	Redistricted from the 26th district.	Tom Sawyer (Greensboro)	Democratic	January 1, 1973 – January 1, 1979		Charlie Webb (Greensboro)	Democratic	January 1, 1973 – January 1, 1979		Robert Payne (McLeansville)	Republican	January 1, 1973 – January 1, 1975	Redistricted from the 26th district.	Margaret Keesee (Greensboro)	Republican	January 1, 1973 – January 1, 1975		1973–1983; All of Guilford County.
Henry Frye (Greensboro)	Democratic	January 1, 1973 – January 1, 1981	Redistricted from the 26th district. Retired to run for State Senate.	Tom Gilmore (Greensboro)	Democratic	January 1, 1973 – January 2, 1978	Resigned.	Charlie Phillips (Greensboro)	Democratic	January 1, 1973 – January 1, 1977	Redistricted from the 26th district.	Tom Sawyer (Greensboro)	Democratic	January 1, 1973 – January 1, 1979		Charlie Webb (Greensboro)	Democratic	January 1, 1973 – January 1, 1979		W. Marcus Short (Greensboro)	Democratic	January 1, 1975 – January 1, 1979		Leo Heer (High Point)	Democratic	January 1, 1975 – January 1, 1977		1973–1983; All of Guilford County.
Henry Frye (Greensboro)	Democratic	January 1, 1973 – January 1, 1981	Redistricted from the 26th district. Retired to run for State Senate.	Tom Gilmore (Greensboro)	Democratic	January 1, 1973 – January 2, 1978	Resigned.	Mary Seymour (Greensboro)	Democratic	January 1, 1977 – January 1, 1983	Redistricted to the 27th district.	Tom Sawyer (Greensboro)	Democratic	January 1, 1973 – January 1, 1979		Charlie Webb (Greensboro)	Democratic	January 1, 1973 – January 1, 1979		W. Marcus Short (Greensboro)	Democratic	January 1, 1975 – January 1, 1979		James Morgan (High Point)	Democratic	January 1, 1977 – January 1, 1983		1973–1983; All of Guilford County.
Henry Frye (Greensboro)	Democratic	January 1, 1973 – January 1, 1981	Redistricted from the 26th district. Retired to run for State Senate.	Vacant		January 2, 1978 – May 9, 1978		Mary Seymour (Greensboro)	Democratic	January 1, 1977 – January 1, 1983	Redistricted to the 27th district.	Tom Sawyer (Greensboro)	Democratic	January 1, 1973 – January 1, 1979		Charlie Webb (Greensboro)	Democratic	January 1, 1973 – January 1, 1979		W. Marcus Short (Greensboro)	Democratic	January 1, 1975 – January 1, 1979		James Morgan (High Point)	Democratic	January 1, 1977 – January 1, 1983		1973–1983; All of Guilford County.
Henry Frye (Greensboro)	Democratic	January 1, 1973 – January 1, 1981	Redistricted from the 26th district. Retired to run for State Senate.	Byron Haworth (High Point)	Democratic	May 9, 1978 – January 1, 1983	Appointed to finish Gilmore's term.	Mary Seymour (Greensboro)	Democratic	January 1, 1977 – January 1, 1983	Redistricted to the 27th district.	Tom Sawyer (Greensboro)	Democratic	January 1, 1973 – January 1, 1979		Charlie Webb (Greensboro)	Democratic	January 1, 1973 – January 1, 1979		W. Marcus Short (Greensboro)	Democratic	January 1, 1975 – January 1, 1979		James Morgan (High Point)	Democratic	January 1, 1977 – January 1, 1983		1973–1983; All of Guilford County.
Henry Frye (Greensboro)	Democratic	January 1, 1973 – January 1, 1981	Redistricted from the 26th district. Retired to run for State Senate.	Byron Haworth (High Point)	Democratic	May 9, 1978 – January 1, 1983	Appointed to finish Gilmore's term.	Mary Seymour (Greensboro)	Democratic	January 1, 1977 – January 1, 1983	Redistricted to the 27th district.	Howard Coble (Greensboro)	Republican	January 1, 1979 – January 1, 1983	Redistricted to the 27th district.	Margaret Keesee (Greensboro)	Republican	January 1, 1979 – January 1, 1983	Redistricted to the 27th district.	Ralph Edwards (Greensboro)	Democratic	January 1, 1979 – January 1, 1983		James Morgan (High Point)	Democratic	January 1, 1977 – January 1, 1983		1973–1983; All of Guilford County.
Dorothy Burnley (High Point)	Republican	January 1, 1981 – January 1, 1983	Redistricted to the 28th district.	Byron Haworth (High Point)	Democratic	May 9, 1978 – January 1, 1983	Appointed to finish Gilmore's term.	Mary Seymour (Greensboro)	Democratic	January 1, 1977 – January 1, 1983	Redistricted to the 27th district.	Howard Coble (Greensboro)	Republican	January 1, 1979 – January 1, 1983	Redistricted to the 27th district.	Margaret Keesee (Greensboro)	Republican	January 1, 1979 – January 1, 1983	Redistricted to the 27th district.	Ralph Edwards (Greensboro)	Democratic	January 1, 1979 – January 1, 1983		James Morgan (High Point)	Democratic	January 1, 1977 – January 1, 1983		1973–1983; All of Guilford County.
Ken Spaulding (Durham)	Democratic	January 1, 1983 – January 1, 1985	Redistricted from the 16th district. Retired to run for Congress.	Paul Pulley Jr. (Durham)	Democratic	January 1, 1983 – January 1, 1985	Redistricted from the 16th district. Redistricted to the 68th district.	George Miller Jr. (Durham)	Democratic	January 1, 1983 – January 1, 1985	Redistricted from the 16th district. Redistricted to the 69th district.																	1983–1985; All of Durham County.
Mickey Michaux (Durham)	Democratic	January 1, 1985 – January 1, 2003	Redistricted to the 31st district.																									1985–2003; Part of Durham County.
Mickey Michaux (Durham)	Democratic	January 1, 1985 – January 1, 2003	Redistricted to the 31st district.	Sharon Thompson (Durham)	Democratic	January 1, 1989 – January 1, 1991	Redistricted from the 68th district.	George Miller Jr. (Durham)	Democratic	January 1, 1989 – January 1, 2001	Redistricted from the 69th district. Lost re-nomination																	1985–2003; Part of Durham County.
Mickey Michaux (Durham)	Democratic	January 1, 1985 – January 1, 2003	Redistricted to the 31st district.	Paul Luebke (Durham)	Democratic	January 1, 1991 – January 1, 2003	Redistricted to the 30th district.	George Miller Jr. (Durham)	Democratic	January 1, 1989 – January 1, 2001	Redistricted from the 69th district. Lost re-nomination																	1985–2003; Part of Durham County.
Mickey Michaux (Durham)	Democratic	January 1, 1985 – January 1, 2003	Redistricted to the 31st district.	Paul Luebke (Durham)	Democratic	January 1, 1991 – January 1, 2003	Redistricted to the 30th district.	Paul Miller (Durham)	Democratic	January 1, 2001 – January 1, 2003	Redistricted to the 29th district.																	1985–2003; Part of Durham County.

=== Single-member district ===
Representative	Party	Dates	Notes	Counties
Joe Tolson (Pinetops)	Democratic	January 1, 2003 – January 1, 2015	Redistricted from the 71st district. Retired.	2003–2013; Parts of Edgecombe and Wilson counties.
Joe Tolson (Pinetops)	Democratic	January 1, 2003 – January 1, 2015	Redistricted from the 71st district. Retired.	2013–2023; All of Edgecombe and Martin counties.
Shelly Willingham (Rocky Mount)	Democratic	January 1, 2015 – Present	Lost re-nomination.	2013–2023; All of Edgecombe and Martin counties.
Shelly Willingham (Rocky Mount)	Democratic	January 1, 2015 – Present	Lost re-nomination.	2023–Present; All of Edgecombe, Martin, and Bertie counties.

== Election results ==
=== 2026 ===
North Carolina House of Representatives 23rd district Democratic primary election, 2026
Party	Candidate	Votes	%
Democratic	Patricia Smith	5,231	55.70%
Democratic	Shelly Willingham (incumbent)	4,161	44.30%
Total votes		9,392	100%

North Carolina House of Representatives 23rd district general election, 2026
Party	Candidate	Votes	%
Democratic	Patricia Smith		
Republican	Brent Roberson		
Total votes			100%

=== 2024 ===
North Carolina House of Representatives 23rd district Democratic primary election, 2024
Party	Candidate	Votes	%
Democratic	Shelly Willingham (incumbent)	6,769	78.85%
Democratic	Abbie Lane	1,816	21.15%
Total votes		8,585	100%

North Carolina House of Representatives 23rd district general election, 2024
Party	Candidate	Votes	%
Democratic	Shelly Willingham (incumbent)	25,140	56.46%
Republican	Brent Roberson	19,390	43.54%
Total votes		44,530	100%
Democratic hold			

=== 2022 ===
North Carolina House of Representatives 23rd district general election, 2022
Party	Candidate	Votes	%
Democratic	Shelly Willingham (incumbent)	16,488	54.42%
Republican	James Crowell Proctor	13,809	45.58%
Total votes		30,297	100%
Democratic hold			

=== 2020 ===
North Carolina House of Representatives 23rd district general election, 2020
Party	Candidate	Votes	%
Democratic	Shelly Willingham (incumbent)	21,754	58.76%
Republican	Claiborne Holtzman	14,656	39.59%
Green	Abbie "Bud" Lane	612	1.65%
Total votes		37,022	100%
Democratic hold			

=== 2018 ===
North Carolina House of Representatives 23rd district general election, 2018
Party	Candidate	Votes	%
Democratic	Shelly Willingham (incumbent)	15,959	60.85%
Republican	Claiborne Holtzman	10,266	39.15%
Total votes		26,225	100%
Democratic hold			

=== 2016 ===
North Carolina House of Representatives 23rd district general election, 2016
Party	Candidate	Votes	%
Democratic	Shelly Willingham (incumbent)	27,208	100%
Total votes		27,208	100%
Democratic hold			

=== 2014 ===
North Carolina House of Representatives 23rd district Democratic primary election, 2014
Party	Candidate	Votes	%
Democratic	Shelly Willingham	2,978	35.61%
Democratic	R. B. "Rusty" Holderness	2,543	30.41%
Democratic	Taro Knight	1,715	20.51%
Democratic	Bronson Williams	1,126	13.47%
Total votes		8,362	100%

North Carolina House of Representatives 23rd district Democratic primary run-off election, 2014
Party	Candidate	Votes	%
Democratic	Shelly Willingham	2,702	52.16%
Democratic	R. B. "Rusty" Holderness	2,478	47.84%
Total votes		5,180	100%

North Carolina House of Representatives 23rd district general election, 2014
Party	Candidate	Votes	%
Democratic	Shelly Willingham	18,660	100%
Total votes		18,660	100%
Democratic hold			

=== 2012 ===
North Carolina House of Representatives 23rd district Democratic primary election, 2012
Party	Candidate	Votes	%
Democratic	Joe Tolson (incumbent)	7,575	58.75%
Democratic	William Solomon Jr.	5,318	41.25%
Total votes		12,893	100%

North Carolina House of Representatives 23rd district general election, 2012
Party	Candidate	Votes	%
Democratic	Joe Tolson (incumbent)	30,670	100%
Total votes		30,670	100%
Democratic hold			

=== 2010 ===
North Carolina House of Representatives 23rd district general election, 2010
Party	Candidate	Votes	%
Democratic	Joe Tolson (incumbent)	12,043	53.38%
Republican	Gerald Shepheard	10,517	46.62%
Total votes		22,560	100%
Democratic hold			

=== 2008 ===
North Carolina House of Representatives 23rd district general election, 2008
Party	Candidate	Votes	%
Democratic	Joe Tolson (incumbent)	20,211	62.21%
Republican	Garland Shepheard	12,275	37.79%
Total votes		32,486	100%
Democratic hold			

=== 2006 ===
North Carolina House of Representatives 23rd district general election, 2006
Party	Candidate	Votes	%
Democratic	Joe Tolson (incumbent)	7,924	71.05%
Republican	Henry Williams II	3,228	28.95%
Total votes		11,152	100%
Democratic hold			

=== 2004 ===
North Carolina House of Representatives 23rd district general election, 2004
Party	Candidate	Votes	%
Democratic	Joe Tolson (incumbent)	17,040	65.93%
Republican	Henry Williams II	8,804	34.07%
Total votes		25,844	100%
Democratic hold			

=== 2002 ===
North Carolina House of Representatives 23rd district general election, 2002
Party	Candidate	Votes	%
Democratic	Joe Tolson (incumbent)	9,678	53.38%
Republican	Bettie West	8,244	45.47%
Libertarian	Douglas Ellis	207	1.14%
Total votes		18,129	100%
Democratic hold			

=== 2000 ===
North Carolina House of Representatives 23rd district Democratic primary election, 2000
Party	Candidate	Votes	%
Democratic	Paul Luebke (incumbent)	15,105	31.15%
Democratic	Mickey Michaux (incumbent)	14,256	29.40%
Democratic	Paul Miller	10,238	21.12%
Democratic	George Miller Jr. (incumbent)	8,886	18.33%
Total votes		48,485	100%

North Carolina House of Representatives 23rd district general election, 2000
Party	Candidate	Votes	%
Democratic	Paul Luebke (incumbent)	57,471	33.70%
Democratic	Mickey Michaux (incumbent)	51,329	30.10%
Democratic	Paul Miller	44,521	26.11%
Libertarian	Robert Dorsey	9,819	5.76%
Libertarian	Raymond Ubinger	7,397	4.34%
Total votes		170,537	100%
Democratic hold			
Democratic hold			
Democratic hold			
