= Paul Luebke =

American politician from North Carolina

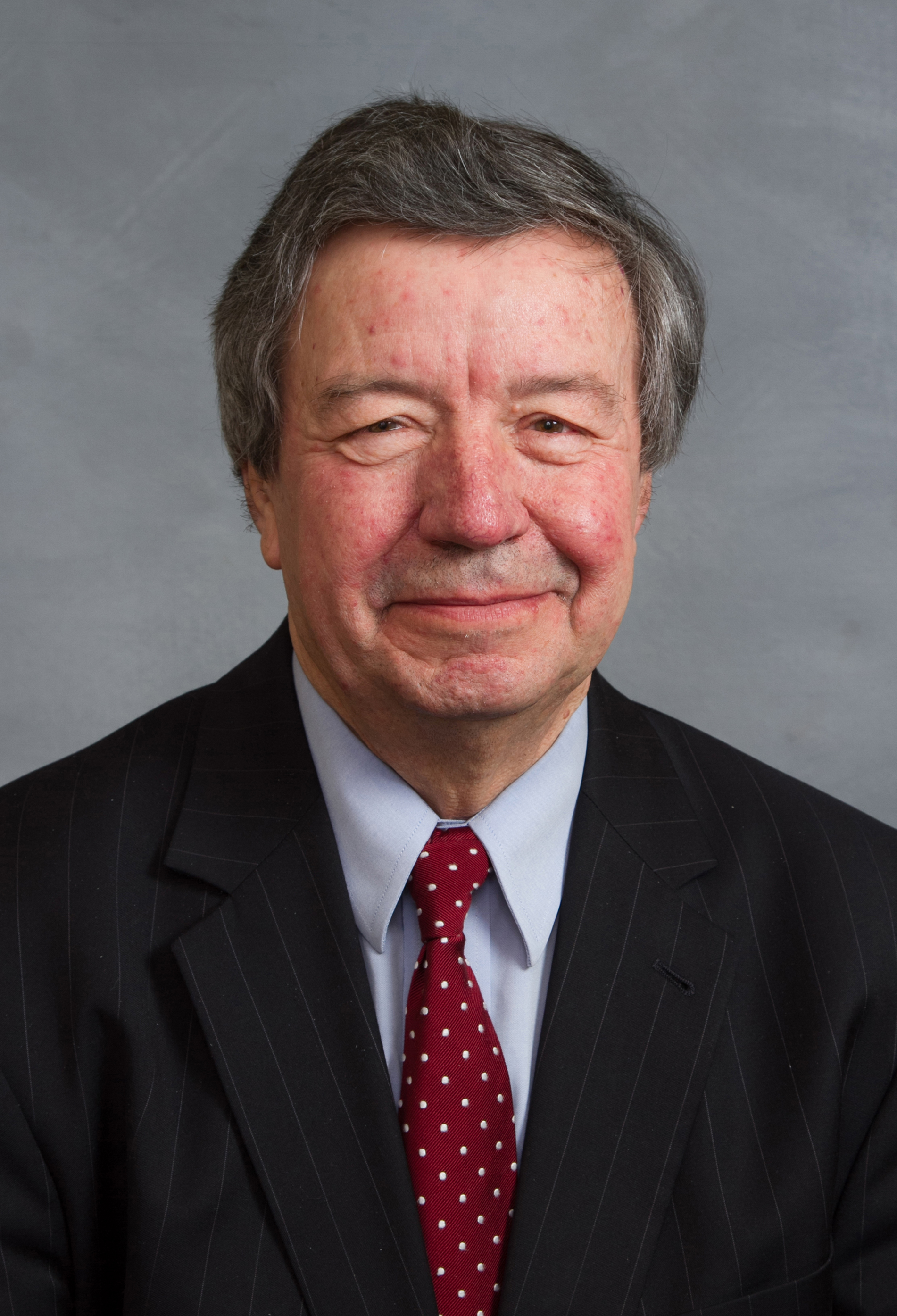

Member of the North Carolina House of Representatives
- In office January 1, 1991 – October 29, 2016
- Preceded by: Sharon Thompson
- Succeeded by: Philip Lehman
- Constituency: 23rd District (1991-2003); 30th District (2003-2016)

Personal details
- Born: January 18, 1946 Chicago, Illinois, U.S.
- Died: October 29, 2016 (aged 70)
- Party: Democratic
- Education: Valparaiso University (BA); Columbia University (PhD)
- Occupation: educator

Paul Luebke (January 18, 1946 – October 29, 2016) was a Democratic member of the North Carolina General Assembly, representing the 30th House District, which includes constituents in Durham County. A professor of Sociology at the University of North Carolina at Greensboro, Luebke served eleven consecutive two-year term in the state House of Representatives.

== Childhood and education ==
Luebke was born on January 18, 1946, in Chicago, Illinois, to Paul and Eunice Luebke. His father was a teacher and education administrator and his mother was a homemaker. Luebke spent his childhood living in Chicago, Detroit and St. Louis. During his high school years he moved to Ankara, Turkey, where his father worked as an education advisor to the Turkish government for the U.S. Foreign Aid Program.

While living in Turkey he studied at Privatschule der deutschen Botschaft, a German embassy school in Ankara, from 1959 until 1962.

After high school, Luebke attended Robert College in Istanbul, Turkey. In 1966 he earned a bachelor of arts in government from Valparaiso University in Indiana. He earned a doctorate in political sociology from Columbia University in 1975.

After graduate school he moved to the Durham area.

== Career ==
Luebke taught sociology at Tougaloo College, a historically black college in Jackson, Mississippi, from 1971 to 1975. He taught sociology at University of North Carolina at Chapel Hill from 1975 to 1976. Luebke began teaching sociology at UNC Greensboro in 1976 and was awarded tenure in 1982.

He was a member of the sociology faculty at the University of North Carolina at Greensboro, specializing in political sociology.

He served on the Raleigh-Durham Airport Authority from 1987 until 1991. He served as a board member of the North Carolina Consumers Council as a consumer rights advocate.

He was elected to the state House of Representatives in Durham's District 23, which then had three members, in 1990 and took up his position in 1991.

As of February 2011 Luebke represented District 30 and was a member of the following committees:

- Agriculture
- Education
- Finance
- Government
- Public utilities
- Rules, calendar and operations of the House

He was a chairman of the Finance committee and of the select committee on Municipal Annexation, as well as vice-chairman of the Election Law, Campaign Finance Reform and Rules, Calendar, and Operations of the House committees. He was also a member of the Energy and Energy Efficiency committee and the Environmental and Natural Resources committee.

He thought of himself as a "Progressive Democrat" and said that "I am especially proud that, during the 1990s, I led the bipartisan effort to eliminate the state sales tax on groceries; and that, in 2009, I was a primary House sponsor of the Racial Justice Act." Luebke died of lymphoma on October 29, 2016, at the age of 70, while still in office.

== Books ==
Luebke wrote of two books about North Carolina politics: Tar Heel Politics: Myths and Realities (1990) and Tar Heel Politics 2000 (1998).

== Electoral history ==
=== 2016 ===
North Carolina House of Representatives 30th district general election, 2016
Party	Candidate	Votes	%
Democratic	Paul Luebke (incumbent)	37,094	73.85%
Republican	Elissa Fuchs	13,132	26.15%
Total votes		50,226	100%
Democratic hold			

=== 2014 ===
North Carolina House of Representatives 30th district general election, 2014
Party	Candidate	Votes	%
Democratic	Paul Luebke (incumbent)	23,535	100%
Total votes		23,535	100%
Democratic hold			

=== 2012 ===
North Carolina House of Representatives 30th district general election, 2012
Party	Candidate	Votes	%
Democratic	Paul Luebke (incumbent)	33,697	100%
Total votes		33,697	100%
Democratic hold			

=== 2010 ===
North Carolina House of Representatives 30th district general election, 2010
Party	Candidate	Votes	%
Democratic	Paul Luebke (incumbent)	13,442	64.52%
Republican	Jason Chambers	7,393	35.48%
Total votes		20,835	100%
Democratic hold			

=== 2008 ===
North Carolina House of Representatives 30th district general election, 2008
Party	Candidate	Votes	%
Democratic	Paul Luebke (incumbent)	25,265	85.78%
Libertarian	Sean Haugh	4,189	14.22%
Total votes		29,454	100%
Democratic hold			

=== 2006 ===
North Carolina House of Representatives 30th district general election, 2006
Party	Candidate	Votes	%
Democratic	Paul Luebke (incumbent)	12,033	100%
Total votes		12,033	100%
Democratic hold			

=== 2004 ===
North Carolina House of Representatives 30th district general election, 2004
Party	Candidate	Votes	%
Democratic	Paul Luebke (incumbent)	21,245	88.10%
Libertarian	Sean Haugh	2,870	11.90%
Total votes		24,115	100%
Democratic hold			

=== 2002 ===
North Carolina House of Representatives 30th district general election, 2002
Party	Candidate	Votes	%
Democratic	Paul Luebke (incumbent)	14,017	84.64%
Libertarian	Terry Mancour	2,543	15.36%
Total votes		16,560	100%
Democratic hold			

=== 2000 ===
North Carolina House of Representatives 23rd district Democratic primary election, 2000
Party	Candidate	Votes	%
Democratic	Paul Luebke (incumbent)	15,105	31.15%
Democratic	Mickey Michaux (incumbent)	14,256	29.40%
Democratic	Paul Miller	10,238	21.12%
Democratic	George W. Miller Jr. (incumbent)	8,886	18.33%
Total votes		48,485	100%

North Carolina House of Representatives 23rd district general election, 2000
Party	Candidate	Votes	%
Democratic	Paul Luebke (incumbent)	57,471	33.70%
Democratic	Mickey Michaux (incumbent)	51,329	30.10%
Democratic	Paul Miller	44,521	26.11%
Libertarian	Robert Dorsey	9,819	5.76%
Libertarian	Raymond Ubinger	7,397	4.34%
Total votes		170,537	100%
Democratic hold			
Democratic hold			
Democratic hold			

== Committee assignments ==
=== 2015-2016 session ===
- Finance (Vice Chair)
- Environment
- Local Government
- Public Utilities

=== 2013-2014 session ===
- Finance (Vice Chair)
- Agriculture
- Education
- Environment
- Government
- Public Utilities

=== 2011-2012 session ===
- Finance
- Rules, Calendar, and Operations of the House
- Agriculture
- Education
- Government
- Public Utilities

=== 2009-2010 session ===
- Election Law and Campaign Finance Reform
- Energy and Energy Efficiency
- Environment and Natural Resources
- Finance
- Rules, Calendar, and Operations of the House

North Carolina House of Representatives
Preceded by Sharon A. Thompson	Member of the North Carolina House of Representatives from the 23rd district 1991–2003; Served alongside: Mickey Michaux, George W. Miller Jr., Paul Miller	Succeeded by Joe Tolson
Preceded by Arlie Culp	Member of the North Carolina House of Representatives from the 30th district 2003–2016	Succeeded by Philip Lehman
