= Paul Miller (North Carolina politician) =

American politician

Paul Miller is a former Democratic member of the North Carolina General Assembly representing the state's twenty-ninth House district, including constituents in Durham county. A computer consultant and investment advisor from Durham, North Carolina, Miller served almost three terms in the state House.

Miller borrowed $13,750 in federally insured student loans in 1980 when he was a student at the Massachusetts Institute of Technology. By March 2004, Miller had paid back just $1,700, according to the complaint, and his loan balance had increased to $23,378 with penalties and interest. In December 2004, Miller learned that the government would begin garnishing his wages, so he offered to make monthly payments of $200 to the U.S. Department of Education, the complaint said. Four months later, Miller sent several letters to the garnishment branch of the Department of Education claiming that he had paid the debt in full in 1992 and enclosing copies of five canceled checks from 1992 totaling $20,500. The Department of Education researched the checks and found that instead of being written for $4,100 each as Miller claimed, they had been written for $100 each. Further, the government found that Miller only owed $14,361 in June 1992, not the more than $20,000 he said he had paid.

He resigned amid allegations that he had committed mail fraud when he tried to convince the U.S. Department of Education that he had paid off more than $20,000 in student loans. Miller was arrested June 8, 2006 on charges that he sent copies of doctored checks to the U.S. Department of Education to make it appear that he had paid off more than $20,000 in student loan debt to avoid garnishment of his pay. The U.S. attorney filed a warrant for Miller's arrest in U.S. District Court, charging him with making a false, fictitious or fraudulent statement and using the U.S. Postal Service to execute a scheme to defraud.

When confronted in Atlanta with the copies of the checks archived by the Department of Education, Miller did not admit guilt but agreed to participate in an investigation, the complaint said.

In December 2006, Miller was sentenced to a year's probation and fined $1,000 by a federal judge. After pleading guilty in September 2006 to falsely claiming he paid more than $20,000, a second charge—that he altered checks to support his claim—was dismissed in an agreement with prosecutors.

North Carolina House of Representatives
Preceded by George W. Miller Jr.	Member of the North Carolina House of Representatives from the 23rd district 2001–2003; Served alongside: Mickey Michaux, Paul Luebke	Succeeded by Joe Tolson
Preceded by Joanne Bowie	Member of the North Carolina House of Representatives from the 29th district 2003–2006	Succeeded by Larry Hall
