= North Carolina's 31st House district =

American legislative district

North Carolina's 31st State House of Representatives district
Representative
| Zack Forde-Hawkins; D–Durham |
- Demographics: 31% White; 41% Black; 19% Hispanic; 5% Asian; 3% Multiracial
- Population (2024): 93,843

North Carolina's 31st House district is one of 120 districts in the North Carolina House of Representatives. It has been represented by Democrat Zack Forde-Hawkins since 2019.

== Geography ==
Since 2003, the district has included part of Durham County. The district overlaps with the 20th and 22nd Senate districts.

== District officeholders ==
=== Multi-member district ===
| Representative | Party | Dates | Notes | Representative | Party | Dates | Notes | Counties |
|---|---|---|---|---|---|---|---|---|
District created January 1, 1967.
| Joe Hege Jr. (Lexington) | Republican | January 1, 1967 – January 1, 1973 | Redistricted to the 30th district. | G. Wayne Whicker (Winston-Salem) | Republican | January 1, 1967 – January 1, 1971 | | 1967–1973; All of Davidson County. |
| Joe Hege Jr. (Lexington) | Republican | January 1, 1967 – January 1, 1973 | Redistricted to the 30th district. | J. Eugene Snyder (Lexington) | Republican | January 1, 1971 – January 1, 1973 | | 1967–1973; All of Davidson County. |
| Austin Mitchell (Kannapolis) | Republican | January 1, 1973 – January 1, 1975 | | Samuel Owen (Salisbury) | Republican | January 1, 1973 – January 1, 1975 | | 1973–1983; All of Rowan County. |
| Robie Nash (Salisbury) | Democratic | January 1, 1975 – January 1, 1983 | Redistricted to the 35th district. | A. Neal Smith (Woodleaf) | Democratic | January 1, 1975 – January 1, 1981 | | 1973–1983; All of Rowan County. |
| Robie Nash (Salisbury) | Democratic | January 1, 1975 – January 1, 1983 | Redistricted to the 35th district. | Bradford Ligon (Salisbury) | Republican | January 1, 1981 – January 1, 1983 | Redistricted to the 35th district. | 1973–1983; All of Rowan County. |

=== Single-member district ===
| Representative | Party | Dates | Notes | Counties |
|---|---|---|---|---|
| T. Clyde Auman (West End) | Democratic | January 1, 1983 – January 1, 1985 | | 1983–1993; All of Moore County. |
| James Craven (Pinebluff) | Republican | January 1, 1985 – January 1, 1991 | Retired. | 1983–1993; All of Moore County. |
| Richard Morgan (Eagle Springs) | Republican | January 1, 1991 – January 1, 2003 | Redistricted to the 52nd district. | 1983–1993; All of Moore County. |
| Richard Morgan (Eagle Springs) | Republican | January 1, 1991 – January 1, 2003 | Redistricted to the 52nd district. | 1993–2003; Part of Moore County. |
| Mickey Michaux (Durham) | Democratic | January 1, 2003 – January 1, 2019 | Redistricted from the 23rd district. Retired. | 2003–Present; Part of Durham County. |
| Zack Forde-Hawkins (Durham) | Democratic | January 1, 2019 – Present | | 2003–Present; Part of Durham County. |

== Election results ==
=== 2024 ===
North Carolina House of Representatives 31st district general election, 2024
| Party | Candidate | Votes | % |
|---|---|---|---|
| Democratic | Zack Forde-Hawkins (incumbent) | 43,291 | 100% |
| Total votes | | 43,291 | 100% |
| Democratic hold | | | |

=== 2022 ===
North Carolina House of Representatives 31st district general election, 2022
| Party | Candidate | Votes | % |
|---|---|---|---|
| Democratic | Zack Forde-Hawkins (incumbent) | 24,814 | 84.20% |
| Libertarian | Sean Haugh | 4,658 | 15.80% |
| Total votes | | 29,472 | 100% |
| Democratic hold | | | |

=== 2020 ===
North Carolina House of Representatives 31st district general election, 2020
| Party | Candidate | Votes | % |
|---|---|---|---|
| Democratic | Zack Forde-Hawkins (incumbent) | 46,341 | 85.51% |
| Libertarian | Sean Haugh | 7,850 | 14.49% |
| Total votes | | 54,191 | 100% |
| Democratic hold | | | |

=== 2018 ===
North Carolina House of Representatives 31st district general election, 2018
| Party | Candidate | Votes | % |
|---|---|---|---|
| Democratic | Zack Forde-Hawkins | 30,613 | 81.00% |
| Republican | Torian Webson | 6,002 | 15.88% |
| Libertarian | Erik Raudsep | 1,179 | 3.12% |
| Total votes | | 37,794 | 100% |
| Democratic hold | | | |

=== 2016 ===
North Carolina House of Representatives 31st district general election, 2016
| Party | Candidate | Votes | % |
|---|---|---|---|
| Democratic | Mickey Michaux (incumbent) | 34,540 | 100% |
| Total votes | | 34,540 | 100% |
| Democratic hold | | | |

=== 2014 ===
North Carolina House of Representatives 31st district general election, 2014
| Party | Candidate | Votes | % |
|---|---|---|---|
| Democratic | Mickey Michaux (incumbent) | 20,745 | 88.18% |
| Republican | Todd Conrad | 2,780 | 11.82% |
| Total votes | | 23,525 | 100% |
| Democratic hold | | | |

=== 2012 ===
North Carolina House of Representatives 31st district general election, 2012
| Party | Candidate | Votes | % |
|---|---|---|---|
| Democratic | Mickey Michaux (incumbent) | 32,497 | 100% |
| Total votes | | 32,497 | 100% |
| Democratic hold | | | |

=== 2010 ===
North Carolina House of Representatives 31st district general election, 2010
| Party | Candidate | Votes | % |
|---|---|---|---|
| Democratic | Mickey Michaux (incumbent) | 18,801 | 75.50% |
| Republican | Patricia Ladd | 6,102 | 24.50% |
| Total votes | | 24,903 | 100% |
| Democratic hold | | | |

=== 2008 ===
North Carolina House of Representatives 31st district general election, 2008
| Party | Candidate | Votes | % |
|---|---|---|---|
| Democratic | Mickey Michaux (incumbent) | 34,609 | 100% |
| Total votes | | 34,609 | 100% |
| Democratic hold | | | |

=== 2006 ===
North Carolina House of Representatives 31st district general election, 2006
| Party | Candidate | Votes | % |
|---|---|---|---|
| Democratic | Mickey Michaux (incumbent) | 11,555 | 100% |
| Total votes | | 11,555 | 100% |
| Democratic hold | | | |

=== 2004 ===
North Carolina House of Representatives 31st district general election, 2004
| Party | Candidate | Votes | % |
|---|---|---|---|
| Democratic | Mickey Michaux (incumbent) | 23,313 | 85.98% |
| Libertarian | Michael P. Owen | 3,802 | 14.02% |
| Total votes | | 27,115 | 100% |
| Democratic hold | | | |

=== 2002 ===
North Carolina House of Representatives 31st district general election, 2002
| Party | Candidate | Votes | % |
|---|---|---|---|
| Democratic | Mickey Michaux (incumbent) | 12,658 | 81.03% |
| Libertarian | Rachel Mills | 2,963 | 18.97% |
| Total votes | | 15,621 | 100% |
| Democratic hold | | | |

=== 2000 ===
North Carolina House of Representatives 31st district Democratic primary election, 2000
| Party | Candidate | Votes | % |
|---|---|---|---|
| Democratic | Ellen Vann Crews | 2,289 | 66.04% |
| Democratic | Jack L. Barron | 1,177 | 33.96% |
| Total votes | | 3,466 | 100% |

North Carolina House of Representatives 31st district general election, 2000
| Party | Candidate | Votes | % |
|---|---|---|---|
| Republican | Richard Morgan (incumbent) | 16,525 | 54.84% |
| Democratic | Ellen Vann Crews | 13,608 | 45.16% |
| Total votes | | 30,133 | 100% |
| Republican hold | | | |
