= Zack Forde-Hawkins =

American politician from North Carolina

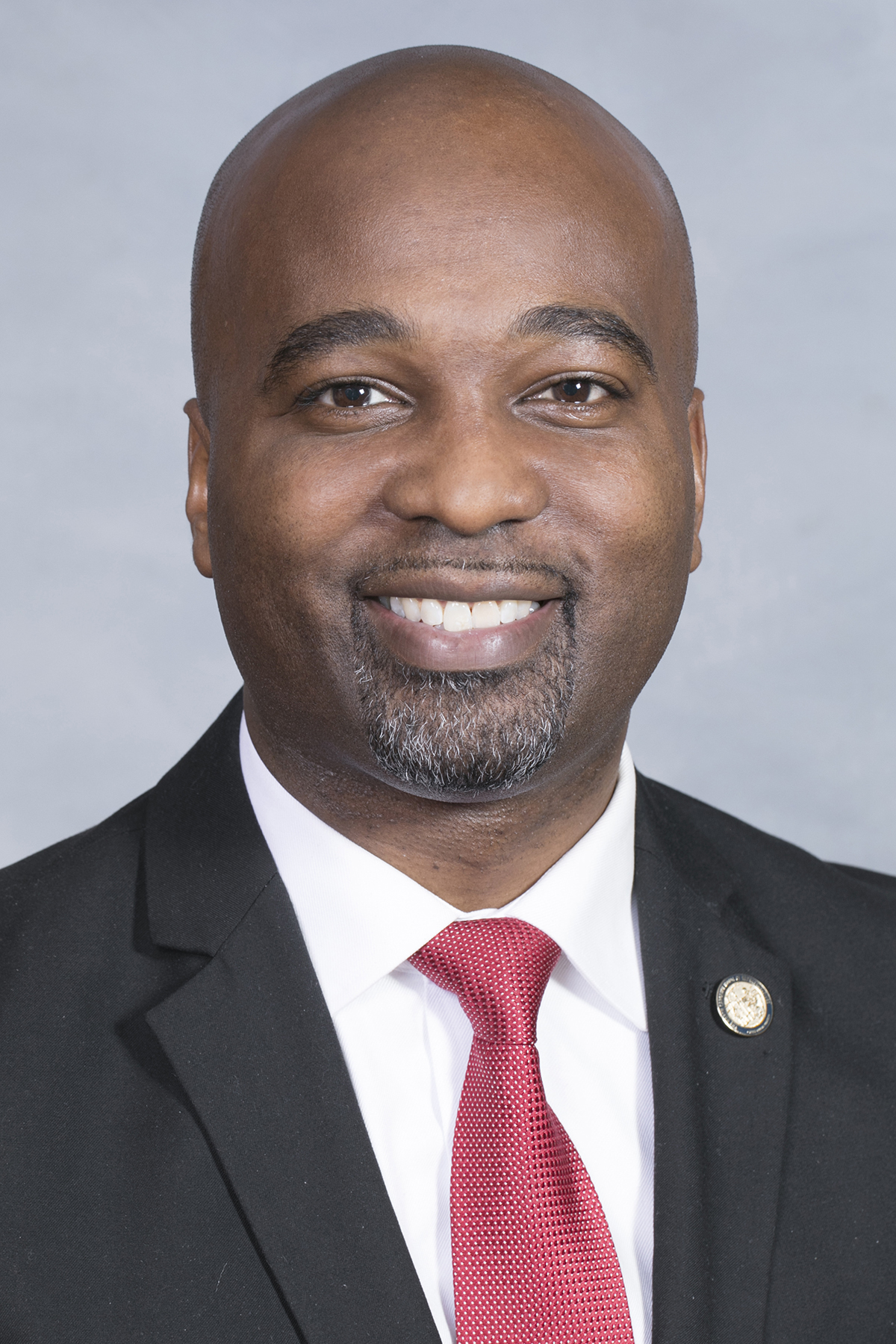

Member of the North Carolina House of Representatives from the 31st district
- Incumbent
- Assumed office January 1, 2019
- Preceded by: Mickey Michaux

Personal details
- Born: Zack Anthony Forde-Hawkins; May 8, 1979 (age 47)
- Party: Democratic
- Spouse: Tracey
- Children: 3
- Education: Elizabeth City State University (BS); North Carolina Central University (MS)

Zack Anthony Forde-Hawkins (born May 8, 1979) is a Democratic member of the North Carolina House of Representatives. He has represented the 31st district (including constituents in eastern Durham County) since 2019.

== Career ==
Forde-Hawkins won the election on November 6, 2018 from the platform of Democratic Party. He secured eighty-one percent of the vote while his closest rival Republican Torian Webson secured sixteen percent. He was re-elected to a second term in 2020, defeating frequent Libertarian candidate Sean Haugh. He's a member of the Progressive House Caucus.

== Electoral history ==
=== 2024 ===
North Carolina House of Representatives 31st district general election, 2024
Party	Candidate	Votes	%
Democratic	Zack Forde-Hawkins (incumbent)	43,291	100%
Total votes		43,291	100%
Democratic hold			

=== 2022 ===
North Carolina House of Representatives 31st district general election, 2022
Party	Candidate	Votes	%
Democratic	Zack Forde-Hawkins (incumbent)	24,814	84.20%
Libertarian	Sean Haugh	4,658	15.80%
Total votes		29,472	100%
Democratic hold			

=== 2020 ===
North Carolina House of Representatives 31st district general election, 2020
Party	Candidate	Votes	%
Democratic	Zack Forde-Hawkins (incumbent)	46,341	85.51%
Libertarian	Sean Haugh	7,850	14.49%
Total votes		54,191	100%
Democratic hold			

=== 2018 ===
North Carolina House of Representatives 31st district general election, 2018
Party	Candidate	Votes	%
Democratic	Zack Forde-Hawkins	30,613	81.00%
Republican	Torian Webson	6,002	15.88%
Libertarian	Erik Raudsep	1,179	3.12%
Total votes		37,794	100%
Democratic hold			

== Committee assignments ==
=== 2021-2022 session ===
- Appropriations
- Appropriations - Education
- Energy and Public Utilities
- Marine Resources and Aqua Culture
- Redistricting
- Transportation

=== 2019-2020 session ===
- Appropriations
- Appropriations - Capital
- Energy and Public Utilities
- Redistricting

North Carolina House of Representatives
Preceded by Mickey Michaux	Member of the North Carolina House of Representatives from the 31st district 2019-present	Incumbent
