= Shelly Willingham =

American politician

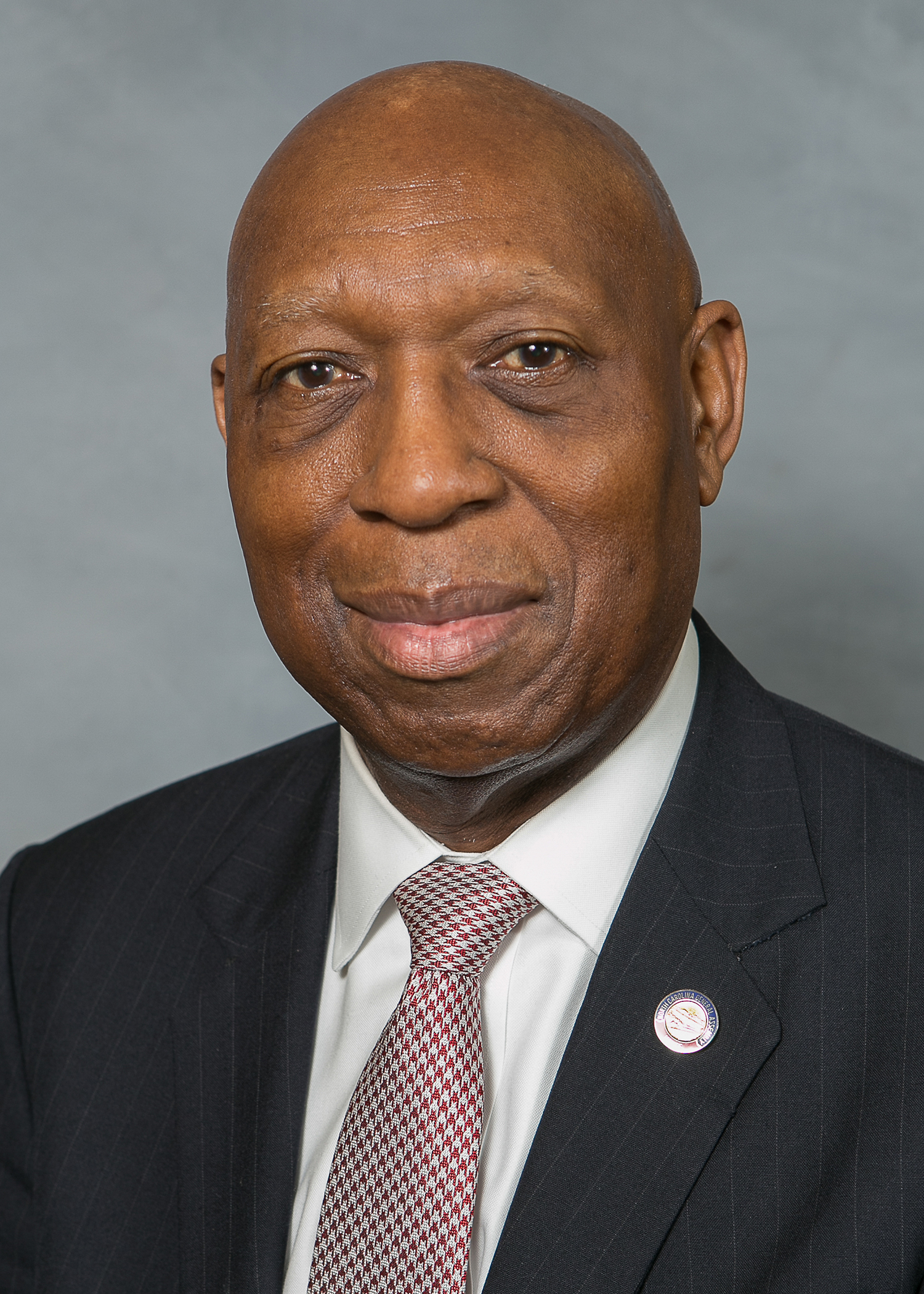
- Official portrait, 2015

Member of the North Carolina House of Representatives
- Incumbent
- Assumed office January 1, 2015
- Preceded by: Joe Tolson
- Succeeded by: Patricia Smith (elect)
- Constituency: 23rd district
- In office January 28, 2002 – January 1, 2003
- Preceded by: Toby Fitch
- Succeeded by: Jean Farmer-Butterfield
- Constituency: 70th district

Personal details
- Born: Shelly Willingham; November 27, 1943 (age 82) Rocky Mount, North Carolina, U.S.
- Party: Democratic
- Education: Elizabeth City State University (BA)

Shelly Willingham (born November 27, 1943) is a Democratic member of the North Carolina House of Representatives. He has represented the 23rd district (which includes all of Martin and Edgecombe counties) since 2015. He previously served in the House from 2002 to 2003.

== Political career ==
Willingham was first appointed to the 70th district of the North Carolina House of Representatives in 2002 to succeed Toby Fitch, who stepped down to become a judge. Willingham ran for a full term in the new 24th district (the geographic successor to the 70th district) in 2002, but lost the primary to Jean Farmer-Butterfield who went on to win the general election. Willingham unsuccessfully challenged state senator Clark Jenkins in the 2004, 2006, and 2008 primaries. Willingham then served 2 terms on the Edgecombe County School Board. Willingham returned to the NC House in 2015, after being elected in 2014 to the 23rd district. Since his initial election in 2014, Willingham has been re-elected to the NC House a total of 4 times, most recently in 2022.

== Electoral history ==
=== 2020 ===
North Carolina House of Representatives 23rd district general election, 2020
Party	Candidate	Votes	%
Democratic	Shelly Willingham (incumbent)	21,754	58.76%
Republican	Claiborne Holtzman	14,656	39.59%
Green	Abbie (Bud) Lane	612	1.65%
Total votes		37,022	100%
Democratic hold			

=== 2018 ===
North Carolina House of Representatives 23rd district general election, 2018
Party	Candidate	Votes	%
Democratic	Shelly Willingham (incumbent)	15,959	60.85%
Republican	Claiborne Holtzman	10,266	39.15%
Total votes		26,225	100%
Democratic hold			

=== 2016 ===
North Carolina House of Representatives 23rd district general election, 2016
Party	Candidate	Votes	%
Democratic	Shelly Willingham (incumbent)	27,208	100%
Total votes		27,208	100%
Democratic hold			

=== 2014 ===
North Carolina House of Representatives 23rd district Democratic primary election, 2014
Party	Candidate	Votes	%
Democratic	Shelly Willingham	2,978	35.61%
Democratic	R. B. (Rusty) Holderness	2,543	30.41%
Democratic	Taro Knight	1,715	20.51%
Democratic	Bronson Williams	1,126	13.47%
Total votes		8,362	100%

North Carolina House of Representatives 23rd district Democratic primary run-off election, 2014
Party	Candidate	Votes	%
Democratic	Shelly Willingham	2,702	52.16%
Democratic	R. B. (Rusty) Holderness	2,478	47.84%
Total votes		5,180	100%

North Carolina House of Representatives 23rd district general election, 2014
Party	Candidate	Votes	%
Democratic	Shelly Willingham	18,660	100%
Total votes		18,660	100%
Democratic hold			

=== 2008 ===
North Carolina Senate 3rd district Democratic primary election, 2008
Party	Candidate	Votes	%
Democratic	Clark Jenkins (incumbent)	16,187	50.52%
Democratic	Shelly Willingham	13,200	41.20%
Democratic	Henry Williams II	2,652	8.28%
Total votes		32,039	100%

=== 2006 ===
North Carolina Senate 3rd district Democratic primary election, 2006
Party	Candidate	Votes	%
Democratic	Clark Jenkins (incumbent)	7,969	64.28%
Democratic	Shelly Willingham	4,429	35.72%
Total votes		12,398	100%

=== 2004 ===
North Carolina Senate 3rd district Democratic primary election, 2004
Party	Candidate	Votes	%
Democratic	Clark Jenkins (incumbent)	5,044	33.13%
Democratic	Shelly Willingham	4,991	32.79%
Democratic	Charles Elliott Johnson	4,011	26.35%
Democratic	Jim Rouse	1,177	7.73%
Total votes		15,223	100%

North Carolina Senate 3rd district Democratic primary run-off election, 2004
Party	Candidate	Votes	%
Democratic	Clark Jenkins (incumbent)	6,070	54.47%
Democratic	Shelly Willingham	5,074	45.53%
Total votes		11,144	100%

=== 2002 ===
North Carolina House of Representatives 24th district Democratic primary election, 2002
Party	Candidate	Votes	%
Democratic	Jean Farmer-Butterfield	2,431	36.11%
Democratic	Shelly Willingham (incumbent)	2,102	31.22%
Democratic	A P Coleman	1,502	22.31%
Democratic	Ronald L. (Ronnie) Williams	697	10.35%
Total votes		6,732	100%

== Committee assignments ==
=== 2021–2022 session ===
- Appropriations
- Appropriations - Transportation
- Alcoholic Beverage Control (Vice Chair)
- Insurance (Vice Chair)
- Election Law and Campaign Finance Reform
- Rules, Calendar, and Operations of the House
- State Personnel

=== 2019–2020 session ===
- Appropriations
- Appropriations - Transportation
- Alcoholic Beverage Control
- Insurance
- Election Law and Campaign Finance Reform
- Rules, Calendar, and Operations of the House
- State and Local Government

=== 2017–2018 session ===
- Appropriations
- Appropriations - Justice and Public Safety
- Alcoholic Beverage Control
- Elections and Ethics Law
- Rules, Calendar, and Operations of the House
- State Personnel
- Transportation

=== 2015–2016 session ===
- Appropriations
- Appropriations - Information Technology
- Alcoholic Beverage Control
- Elections
- Agriculture
- Banking
- Education - Universities
- Judiciary IV
