= Joe P. Tolson =

American politician (1941–2019)

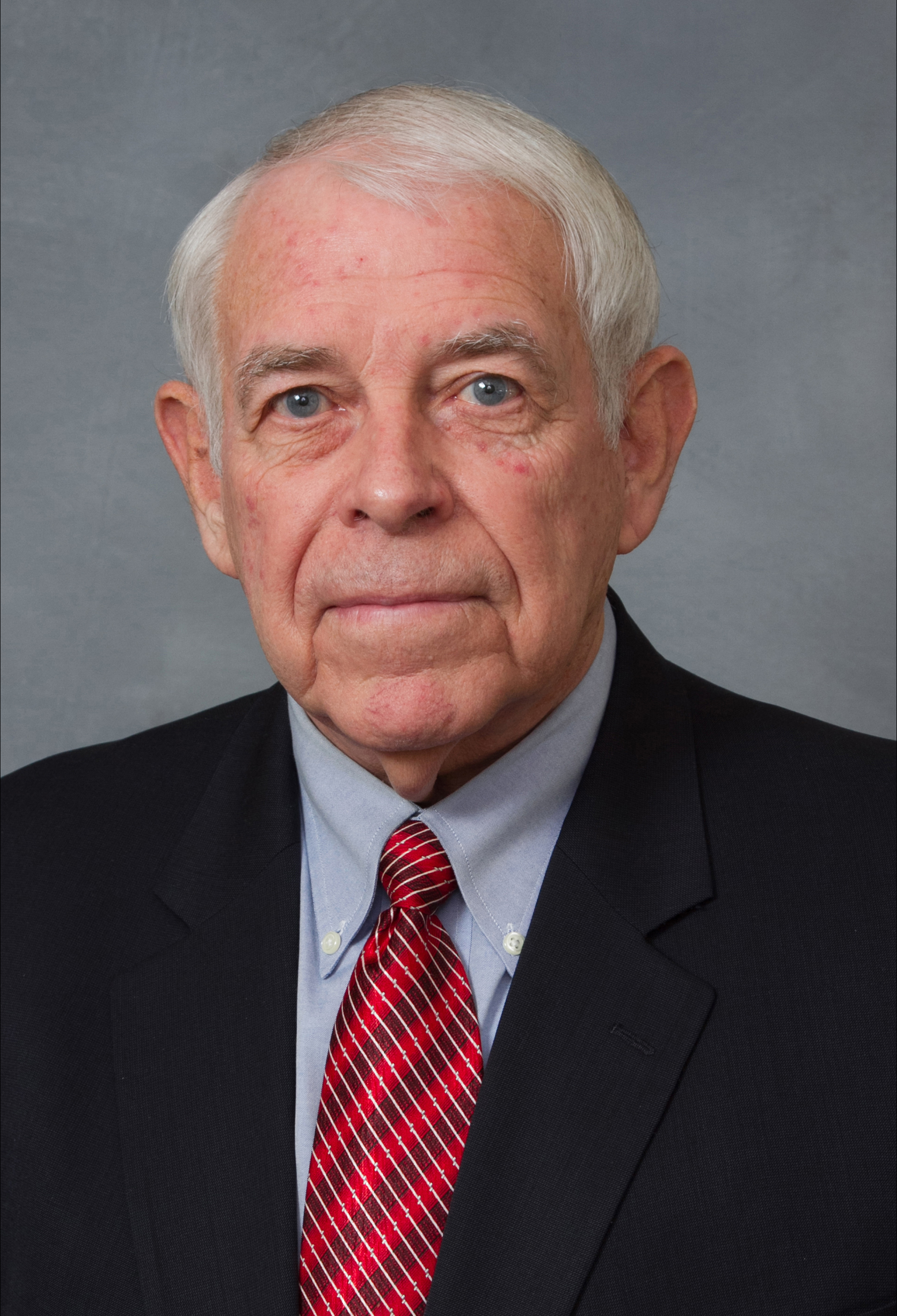

Member of the North Carolina House of Representatives
- In office January 1, 1997 – January 1, 2015
- Preceded by: Edward Norris Tolson
- Succeeded by: Shelly Willingham
- Constituency: 71st District (1997-2003); 23rd District (2003-2015)

Personal details
- Born: April 15, 1941 Pinetops, North Carolina, U.S.
- Died: February 3, 2019 (aged 77) Tarboro, North Carolina, U.S.
- Party: Democratic
- Education: Barton College, University of Virginia
- Occupation: educator

Joe Pat Tolson (April 15, 1941 – February 3, 2019) was an American educator and Democratic member of the North Carolina General Assembly representing the state's twenty-third House district, including constituents in Edgecombe and Wilson counties. A retired educator from Pinetops, North Carolina, Tolson retired after the 2013-2014 session, serving his ninth term in the state House. He was replaced by Shelly Willingham. Tolson died in 2019 from respiratory failure at a hospital in Tarboro, North Carolina.

Tolson received his bachelor's and master's degrees from Barton College and University of Virginia. He served as assistant vice-president for Edgecombe Community College.

== Electoral history ==
=== 2012 ===
North Carolina House of Representatives 23rd district Democratic primary election, 2012
Party	Candidate	Votes	%
Democratic	Joe Tolson (incumbent)	7,575	58.75%
Democratic	William Solomon Jr.	5,318	41.25%
Total votes		12,893	100%

North Carolina House of Representatives 23rd district general election, 2012
Party	Candidate	Votes	%
Democratic	Joe Tolson (incumbent)	30,670	100%
Total votes		30,670	100%
Democratic hold			

=== 2010 ===
North Carolina House of Representatives 23rd district general election, 2010
Party	Candidate	Votes	%
Democratic	Joe Tolson (incumbent)	12,043	53.38%
Republican	Gerald Shepheard	10,517	46.62%
Total votes		22,560	100%
Democratic hold			

=== 2008 ===
North Carolina House of Representatives 23rd district general election, 2008
Party	Candidate	Votes	%
Democratic	Joe Tolson (incumbent)	20,211	62.21%
Republican	Garland Shepheard	12,275	37.79%
Total votes		32,486	100%
Democratic hold			

=== 2006 ===
North Carolina House of Representatives 23rd district general election, 2006
Party	Candidate	Votes	%
Democratic	Joe Tolson (incumbent)	7,924	71.05%
Republican	Henry Williams II	3,228	28.95%
Total votes		11,152	100%
Democratic hold			

=== 2004 ===
North Carolina House of Representatives 23rd district general election, 2004
Party	Candidate	Votes	%
Democratic	Joe Tolson (incumbent)	17,040	65.93%
Republican	Henry Williams II	8,804	34.07%
Total votes		25,844	100%
Democratic hold			

=== 2002 ===
North Carolina House of Representatives 23rd district general election, 2002
Party	Candidate	Votes	%
Democratic	Joe Tolson (incumbent)	9,678	53.38%
Republican	Bettie West	8,244	45.47%
Libertarian	Douglas Ellis	207	1.14%
Total votes		18,129	100%
Democratic hold			

=== 2000 ===
North Carolina House of Representatives 71st district general election, 2000
Party	Candidate	Votes	%
Democratic	Joe Tolson (incumbent)	12,915	63.30%
Republican	Wade Ellison	7,489	36.70%
Total votes		20,404	100%
Democratic hold			

North Carolina House of Representatives
Preceded by Edward Norris Tolson	Member of the North Carolina House of Representatives from the 71st district 1997–2003	Succeeded by Larry Womble
Preceded by Mickey Michaux; Paul Luebke; Paul Miller	Member of the North Carolina House of Representatives from the 23rd district 2003–2015	Succeeded by Shelly Willingham
