= George W. Miller Jr. =

American politician

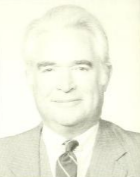
- Miller in the 1999 legislative manual

Member of the North Carolina House of Representatives
- In office 1971–2000

Personal details
- Born: May 14, 1930 Spencer, North Carolina, U.S.
- Died: December 15, 2021 (aged 91)
- Party: Democratic
- Spouse: Eula Hux
- Education: University of North Carolina; University of North Carolina School of Law

George W. Miller Jr. (May 14, 1930 – December 15, 2021) was an American politician. He served as a Democratic member of the North Carolina House of Representatives.

== Life and career ==
Miller was born in Spencer, North Carolina. He attended the University of North Carolina and the University of North Carolina School of Law. He served in the United States Marine Corps during the Korean conflict.

In 1971, Miller was elected to the North Carolina House of Representatives, serving until 2000.

Miller died in December 2021 at his home, at the age of 91.
