= Mickey Michaux =

American politician

Henry M. "Mickey" Michaux
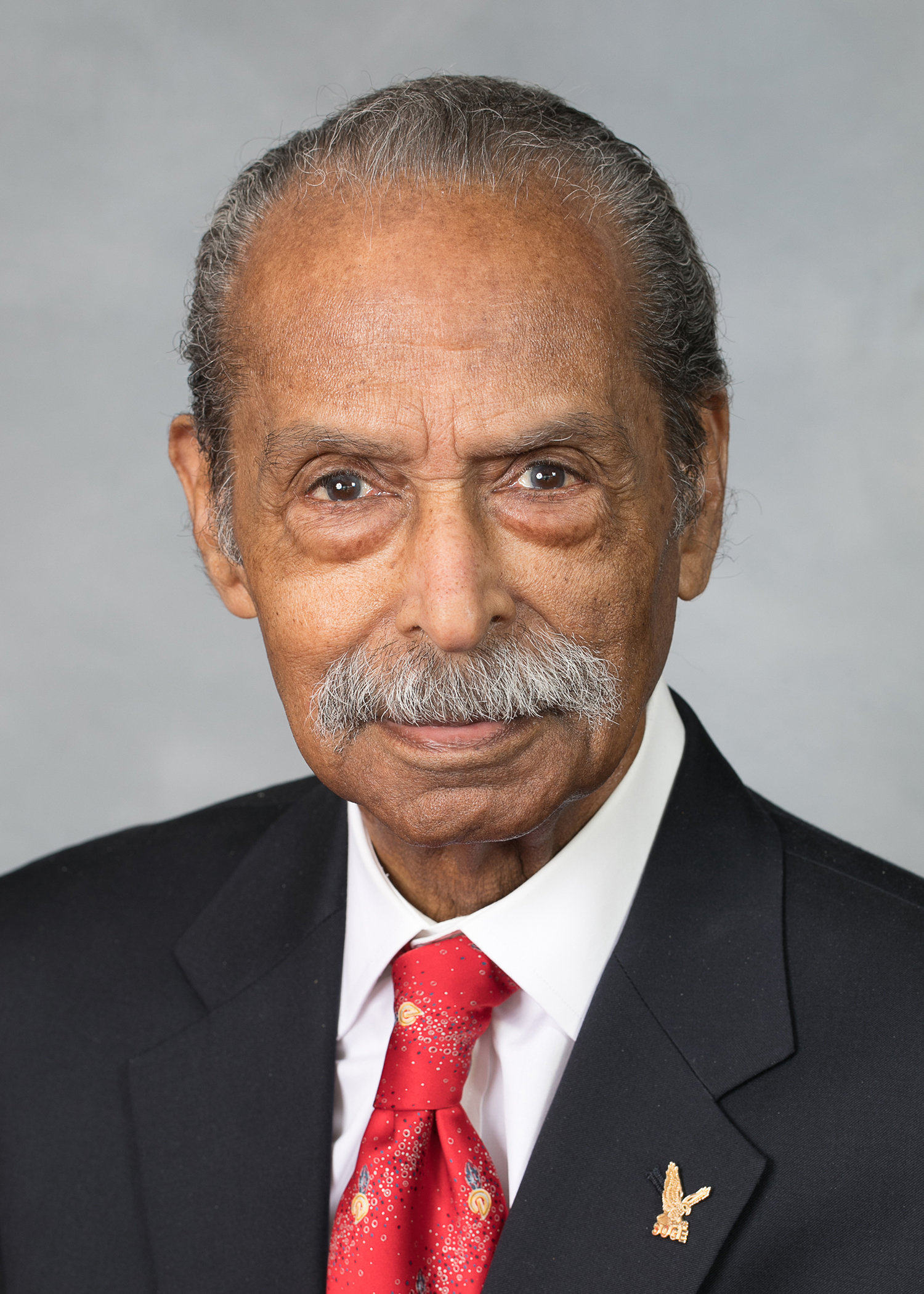

Member of the North Carolina Senate from the 20th district
- In office January 13, 2020 – March 31, 2020
- Preceded by: Floyd McKissick, Jr.
- Succeeded by: Natalie Murdock

Member of the North Carolina House of Representatives from the 31st district
- In office 2003–2019
- Preceded by: Richard T. Morgan
- Succeeded by: Zack Forde-Hawkins

Member of the North Carolina House of Representatives from the 23rd district
- In office 1985–2003
- Preceded by: George W. Miller Jr. W. Paul Pulley, Jr. Kenneth B. Spaulding
- Succeeded by: Joe P. Tolson

United States Attorney for the Middle District of North Carolina
- In office 1977–1980
- President: Jimmy Carter
- Preceded by: Benjamin H. White, Jr.
- Succeeded by: Kenneth W. McAllister

Member of the North Carolina House of Representatives from the 16th district
- In office 1973 – July 18, 1977
- Preceded by: Bobby W. Rogers; James D. Speed
- Succeeded by: A. J. Howard Clement, III

Personal details
- Born: Henry McKinley Michaux; September 4, 1930 (age 96) Durham, North Carolina, U.S.
- Party: Democratic
- Spouse: June Michaux
- Education: North Carolina Central University (BS, JD)
- Profession: Attorney, real estate, insurance

Henry McKinley "Mickey" Michaux Jr. (born September 4, 1930) is an American civil rights activist and Democratic member of the North Carolina General Assembly. He represented the state's thirty-first House district from 1983 to 2019 and previously served from 1973 through 1977. The district included constituents in Durham County. Upon his retirement, Michaux was the longest-serving member of the North Carolina General Assembly. In the 2007-2008 session, Michaux served as senior chairman of the House Appropriations Committee and chairman of the House Select Committee on Street Gang Prevention.

In 2020, at age 89, Michaux was appointed to fill a seat in the North Carolina Senate temporarily, following the resignation of Sen. Floyd McKissick, Jr.

== Personal life ==
Henry M. Michaux Jr. was born on September 4, 1930, to Henry M. Michaux and Isadore M. Coates in Durham, North Carolina, United States.

Representative Michaux and his wife June have two children, Jocelyn and Cicero. He and his wife currently reside in Durham, North Carolina.

== Education ==
In 1948, Michaux attended Alice Freeman Palmer Memorial Institute in Sedalia, North Carolina. He later went on to attend North Carolina Central University in Durham, North Carolina, where he received both his Bachelor of Science in Biology in 1952 and his Doctor of Jurisprudence (JD) in 1964. Representative Michaux also did some graduate work in physiology and biochemistry at Rutgers University in New Jersey and in Business Administration and Economics at North Carolina Central University. He holds an Honorary Doctor of Laws from North Carolina Central University as well.

== Career ==
An attorney and businessman, Michaux is a native of Durham, North Carolina, and an alumnus of Durham's North Carolina Central University. He served in the United States Army Medical Corps from 1952 to 1954 and in the Army Reserves from 1954 until 1960. In the 1950s, Michaux became involved with the civil rights movement, and established a close friendship with Martin Luther King Jr. After serving as an assistant district attorney, he was elected to the North Carolina House of Representatives in 1972, having gone into politics at King's suggestion. In 1977, Michaux became the first black United States Attorney in the South since Reconstruction when he was appointed to head the office in the Middle District of North Carolina. Following the confirmation of his appointment, Michaux resigned from the House of Representatives on July 18, 1977. Leaving the attorney's office at the end of the Carter administration, Michaux ran for Congress in 1982. He returned to the state legislature in 1983.

He is currently still a practicing attorney and is partner at Michaux and Michaux Practicing Attorneys which was established in 1970. Michaux is the current Vice President of Union Insurance and Realty Company and has held this position since 1955.

== Runoff election threshold ==
Michaux polled the most votes in the first round of the 1982 Democratic primary for Congress, but because no candidate received more than 50 percent of the vote, he was forced into a runoff with Tim Valentine. Valentine won the runoff, and Michaux returned to the state legislature. There, he pushed for the elimination of primary runoffs, and eventually the law was changed to lower the threshold to winning 40 percent to avoid a runoff. Had that law been in place and Michaux won the general election in 1982, he would have been the first African-American elected to Congress from North Carolina in the twentieth century.

In 1992, Michaux lost the Democratic primary in the new 12th congressional district to Mel Watt.

== Awards and accolades ==
Representative Michaux was inducted into the Black College Alumni Hall of Fame in 2011. His contributions have also been recognized by North Carolina Central University, which renamed its School of Education in his honor in 2007. Michaux has served three terms as the National President of the NCCU Alumni Association as well as terms as a member of the Board of Trustees and the Board of Directors of the NCCU Foundation, Inc.

In November 2022, North Carolina Governor Roy Cooper awarded Michaux the North Carolina Award, the highest civilian honor given by the state, for his public service.

== Memberships ==
Michaux holds memberships in the National Bar Association, North Carolina Bar Association, and the North Carolina Association of Black Lawyers. While obtaining his undergraduate degree at North Carolina Central University, Michaux was a member of the Lampodas Club of Omega Psi Phi fraternity where he served as treasurer in 1949.

== Works cited ==
- Cheney, John L. Jr. (1977). North Carolina Manual. Raleigh: North Carolina Secretary of State. OCLC 1245537.

North Carolina House of Representatives
Preceded by Bobby W. Rogers; James D. Speed	Member of the North Carolina House of Representatives from the 16th district 1973–1977	Succeeded by A. J. Howard Clement, III
Preceded by George W. Miller Jr. W. Paul Pulley, Jr. Kenneth B. Spaulding	Member of the North Carolina House of Representatives from the 23rd district 1985–2003	Succeeded by Joe P. Tolson
Preceded by Richard T. Morgan	Member of the North Carolina House of Representatives from the 31st district 2003–2019	Succeeded by Zack Forde-Hawkins
Legal offices
Preceded by Benjamin H. White, Jr.	United States Attorney for the Middle District of North Carolina; 1977–1980	Succeeded by Kenneth W. McAllister
North Carolina Senate
Preceded by Floyd McKissick, Jr.	Member of the North Carolina Senate from the 20th district 2020	Succeeded by Natalie Murdock
