= Ken Fontenot =

American politician

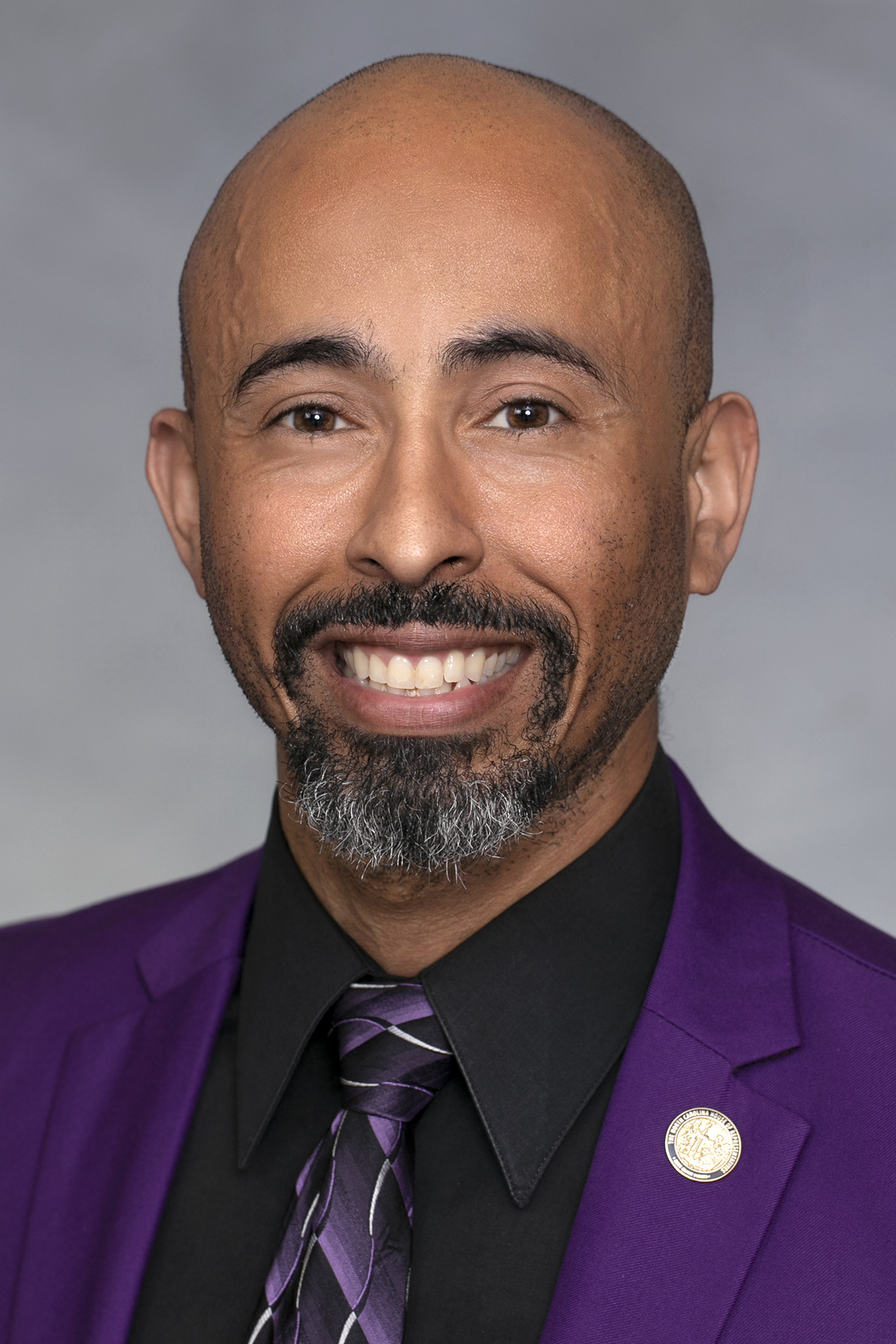

Member of the North Carolina House of Representatives from the 24th district
- In office January 1, 2023 – January 1, 2025
- Preceded by: Linda Cooper-Suggs
- Succeeded by: Dante Pittman

Personal details
- Born: Kenneth James Fontenot Chicago, Illinois, U.S.
- Party: Republican
- Spouse: Francesca
- Children: 3
- Education: California State University San Marcos (BA); Ashford University (MPA); Northeastern University (EdD)
- Occupation: Pastor
- Website: Official website

Kenneth James Fontenot is a Republican former member of the North Carolina House of Representatives, who represented the 24th district (including all of Wilson County, as well as part of Nash County) from 2023 to 2025. A pastor, Marine Corps veteran, and former Social Studies teacher, Fontenot unsuccessfully ran for the same seat in 2018.

== Electoral history ==
=== 2024 ===
North Carolina House of Representatives 24th district general election, 2024
Party	Candidate	Votes	%
Democratic	Dante Pittman	21,343	51.10%
Republican	Ken Fontenot (incumbent)	20,425	48.90%
Total votes		41,768	100%
Democratic gain from Republican			

=== 2022 ===
North Carolina House of Representatives 24th district general election, 2022
Party	Candidate	Votes	%
Republican	Ken Fontenot	15,121	54.22%
Democratic	Linda Cooper-Suggs (incumbent)	12,768	45.78%
Total votes		27,889	100%
Republican gain from Democratic			

=== 2018 ===
North Carolina House of Representatives 24th district general election, 2018
Party	Candidate	Votes	%
Democratic	Jean Farmer-Butterfield (incumbent)	14,219	50.80%
Unaffiliated	Ken Fontenot	13,770	49.20%
Total votes		27,989	100%
Democratic hold			

== Committee assignments ==
=== 2023-2024 session ===
- Education - K-12
- Finance
- Health
- Military and Veterans Affairs
- Redistricting

North Carolina House of Representatives
Preceded by Linda Cooper-Suggs	Member of the North Carolina House of Representatives from the 24th district 2023–2025	Succeeded by Dante Pittman
