= North Carolina's 27th House district =

American legislative district

North Carolina's 27th State House of Representatives district
Representative
Rodney Pierce; D–Roanoke Rapids
- Demographics: 37% White; 51% Black; 3% Hispanic; 1% Asian; 3% Native American; 4% Multiracial
- Population (2024): 83,401

North Carolina's 27th House district is one of 120 districts in the North Carolina House of Representatives. It has been represented by Democrat Rodney Pierce since 2025.

== Geography ==
Since 2023, the district has included all of Warren, Halifax and Northampton counties. The district overlaps with the 1st and 2nd Senate districts.

== District officeholders ==
=== Multi-member district ===
Representative	Party	Dates	Notes	Representative	Party	Dates	Notes	Counties
District created January 1, 1967.
C. Roby Garner Sr. (Asheboro)	Republican	January 1, 1967 – January 1, 1971	Redistricted from the Randolph County district.	Colon Blake (Candor)	Republican	January 1, 1967 – January 1, 1973		1967–1973; All of Randolph and Montgomery counties.
John Ingram (Asheboro)	Democratic	January 1, 1971 – January 1, 1973	Redistricted to the 24th district and retired to run for Insurance Commissioner.	Colon Blake (Candor)	Republican	January 1, 1967 – January 1, 1973		1967–1973; All of Randolph and Montgomery counties.

=== Single-member district ===
Representative	Party	Dates	Notes	Counties
Thomas Hunter (Rockingham)	Democratic	January 1, 1973 – January 1, 1979	Redistricted from the 29th district.	1973–1983; All of Richmond County.
John Covington Jr. (Rockingham)	Democratic	January 1, 1979 – January 1, 1981		1973–1983; All of Richmond County.
Thomas Hunter (Rockingham)	Democratic	January 1, 1981 – January 1, 1983		1973–1983; All of Richmond County.

=== Multi-member district ===
Representative	Party	Dates	Notes	Representative	Party	Dates	Notes	Representative	Party	Dates	Notes	Counties
Mary Seymour (Greensboro)	Democratic	January 1, 1983 – January 1, 1985	Redistricted from the 23rd district.	Howard Coble (Greensboro)	Republican	January 1, 1983 – January 1, 1985	Redistricted from the 23rd district. Retired to run for Congress.	Margaret Keesee-Forrester (Greensboro)	Republican	January 1, 1983 – January 1, 1989	Redistricted from the 23rd district.	1983–1993; Part of Guilford County.
Albert Lineberry Sr. (Greensboro)	Democratic	January 1, 1985 – January 1, 1993		Frank Sizemore III (Greensboro)	Republican	January 1, 1985 – January 1, 1991		Margaret Keesee-Forrester (Greensboro)	Republican	January 1, 1983 – January 1, 1989	Redistricted from the 23rd district.	1983–1993; Part of Guilford County.
Albert Lineberry Sr. (Greensboro)	Democratic	January 1, 1985 – January 1, 1993		Frank Sizemore III (Greensboro)	Republican	January 1, 1985 – January 1, 1991		Joanne Bowie (Greensboro)	Republican	January 1, 1989 – January 1, 1993	Redistricted to the 29th district.	1983–1993; Part of Guilford County.
Albert Lineberry Sr. (Greensboro)	Democratic	January 1, 1985 – January 1, 1993		Maggie Jeffus (Greensboro)	Democratic	January 1, 1991 – January 1, 1993	Redistricted to the 89th district.	Joanne Bowie (Greensboro)	Republican	January 1, 1989 – January 1, 1993	Redistricted to the 29th district.	1983–1993; Part of Guilford County.

=== Single-member district ===
Representative	Party	Dates	Notes	Counties
Stephen Wood (High Point)	Republican	January 1, 1993 – January 1, 2001	Redistricted from the 28th district Lost re-nomination. Switched parties. Lost re-election.	1993–2003; Part of Guilford and Davidson counties.
Stephen Wood (High Point)	Reform	January 1, 1993 – January 1, 2001	Redistricted from the 28th district Lost re-nomination. Switched parties. Lost re-election.	1993–2003; Part of Guilford and Davidson counties.
John Blust (Greensboro)	Republican	January 1, 2001 – January 1, 2003	Redistricted to the 62nd district.	1993–2003; Part of Guilford and Davidson counties.
Stanley Fox (Oxford)	Democratic	January 1, 2003 – January 1, 2005	Redistricted from the 78th district. Retired.	2003–2005; Parts of Warren, Vance, and Granville counties.
Michael Wray (Gaston)	Democratic	January 1, 2005 – January 1, 2025	Lost re-nomination.	2005–2013; All of Northampton and Warren counties. Part of Vance County.
Michael Wray (Gaston)	Democratic	January 1, 2005 – January 1, 2025	Lost re-nomination.	2013–2023; All of Halifax and Northampton counties.
Michael Wray (Gaston)	Democratic	January 1, 2005 – January 1, 2025	Lost re-nomination.	2023–Present; All of Warren, Halifax, and Northampton counties.
Rodney Pierce (Roanoke Rapids)	Democratic	January 1, 2025 – Present		2023–Present; All of Warren, Halifax, and Northampton counties.

== Election results ==
=== 2026 ===
North Carolina House of Representatives 27th district Democratic primary election, 2026
Party	Candidate	Votes	%
Democratic	Rodney Pierce (incumbent)	8,715	64.17%
Democratic	Michael Wray	4,866	35.83%
Total votes		13,581	100%

North Carolina House of Representatives 27th district general election, 2026
Party	Candidate	Votes	%
Democratic	Rodney Pierce (incumbent)		
Republican	Kenneth Bentley Jr.		
Total votes			100%

=== 2024 ===
North Carolina House of Representatives 27th district Democratic primary election, 2024
Party	Candidate	Votes	%
Democratic	Rodney Pierce	5,986	50.14%
Democratic	Michael Wray (incumbent)	5,952	49.86%
Total votes		11,938	100%

North Carolina House of Representatives 27th district general election, 2024
Party	Candidate	Votes	%
Democratic	Rodney Pierce	31,914	100%
Total votes		31,914	100%
Democratic hold			

=== 2022 ===
North Carolina House of Representatives 27th district Democratic primary election, 2022
Party	Candidate	Votes	%
Democratic	Michael Wray (incumbent)	10,866	79.00%
Democratic	Jerry McDaniel	2,889	21.00%
Total votes		13,755	100%

North Carolina House of Representatives 27th district general election, 2022
Party	Candidate	Votes	%
Democratic	Michael Wray (incumbent)	18,116	61.44%
Republican	Wes Tripp	11,370	38.56%
Total votes		29,486	100%
Democratic hold			

=== 2020 ===
North Carolina House of Representatives 27th district Democratic primary election, 2020
Party	Candidate	Votes	%
Democratic	Michael Wray (incumbent)	6,856	55.75%
Democratic	Kelby Hicks	4,536	36.89%
Democratic	Jerry McDaniel	905	7.36%
Total votes		12,297	100%

North Carolina House of Representatives 27th district general election, 2020
Party	Candidate	Votes	%
Democratic	Michael Wray (incumbent)	23,169	66.78%
Republican	Warren Scott Nail	11,527	33.22%
Total votes		34,696	100%
Democratic hold			

=== 2018 ===
North Carolina House of Representatives 27th district Democratic primary election, 2018
Party	Candidate	Votes	%
Democratic	Michael Wray (incumbent)	7,319	56.15%
Democratic	Franklin D. Williams Jr.	5,716	43.85%
Total votes		13,035	100%

North Carolina House of Representatives 27th district general election, 2018
Party	Candidate	Votes	%
Democratic	Michael Wray (incumbent)	16,783	69.33%
Republican	Raymond "Ray" Dyer	7,426	30.67%
Total votes		24,209	100%
Democratic hold			

=== 2016 ===
North Carolina House of Representatives 27th district Democratic primary election, 2016
Party	Candidate	Votes	%
Democratic	Michael Wray (incumbent)	7,418	52.39%
Democratic	Franklin D. Williams Jr.	6,741	47.61%
Total votes		14,159	100%

North Carolina House of Representatives 27th district general election, 2016
Party	Candidate	Votes	%
Democratic	Michael Wray (incumbent)	29,200	100%
Total votes		29,200	100%
Democratic hold			

=== 2014 ===
North Carolina House of Representatives 27th district Democratic primary election, 2014
Party	Candidate	Votes	%
Democratic	Michael Wray (incumbent)	8,458	57.97%
Democratic	Franklin D. Williams Jr.	6,132	42.03%
Total votes		14,590	100%

North Carolina House of Representatives 27th district general election, 2014
Party	Candidate	Votes	%
Democratic	Michael Wray (incumbent)	17,446	100%
Total votes		17,446	100%
Democratic hold			

=== 2012 ===
North Carolina House of Representatives 27th district Democratic primary election, 2012
Party	Candidate	Votes	%
Democratic	Michael Wray (incumbent)	9,052	61.71%
Democratic	James Mills	5,616	38.29%
Total votes		14,668	100%

North Carolina House of representatives 27th district general election, 2012
Party	Candidate	Votes	%
Democratic	Michael Wray (incumbent)	29,714	90.94%
Libertarian	Jesse Shearin	2,960	9.06%
Total votes		32,674	100%
Democratic hold			

=== 2010 ===
North Carolina House of Representatives 27th district general election, 2010
Party	Candidate	Votes	%
Democratic	Michael Wray (incumbent)	17,701	100%
Total votes		17,701	100%
Democratic hold			

=== 2008 ===
North Carolina House of Representatives 27th district general election, 2008
Party	Candidate	Votes	%
Democratic	Michael Wray (incumbent)	27,387	100%
Total votes		27,387	100%
Democratic hold			

=== 2006 ===
North Carolina House of Representatives 27th district Democratic primary election, 2006
Party	Candidate	Votes	%
Democratic	Michael Wray (incumbent)	8,551	76.71%
Democratic	Anthony Butler	1,878	16.85%
Democratic	Howard Ervin	718	6.44%
Total votes			100%

North Carolina House of Representatives 27th district general election, 2006
Party	Candidate	Votes	%
Democratic	Michael Wray (incumbent)	13,839	100%
Total votes		13,839	100%
Democratic hold			

=== 2004 ===
North Carolina House of Representatives 27th district Democratic primary election, 2004
Party	Candidate	Votes	%
Democratic	Richard M. Henderson	2,882	29.31%
Democratic	Michael Wray	2,874	29.23%
Democratic	Grace M. Edwards	2,290	23.29%
Democratic	John Soles	1,586	16.13%
Democratic	Julius O. Webb	200	2.03%
Total votes		9,832	100%

North Carolina House of Representatives 27th district Democratic primary run-off election, 2004
Party	Candidate	Votes	%
Democratic	Michael Wray	2,982	51.36%
Democratic	Richard M. Henderson	2,824	48.64%
Total votes		5,806	100%

North Carolina House of Representatives 27th district general election, 2004
Party	Candidate	Votes	%
Democratic	Michael Wray	21,237	100%
Total votes		21,237	100%
Democratic hold			

=== 2002 ===
North Carolina House of Representatives 27th district general election, 2002
Party	Candidate	Votes	%
Democratic	Stanley Fox (incumbent)	13,193	100%
Total votes		13,193	100%
Democratic hold			

=== 2000 ===
North Carolina House of Representatives 27th district Republican primary election, 2000
Party	Candidate	Votes	%
Republican	John Blust	3,843	59.57%
Republican	Stephen Wood (incumbent)	2,608	40.43%
Total votes		6,451	100%

North Carolina House of Representatives 27th district general election, 2000
Party	Candidate	Votes	%
Republican	John Blust	24,063	83.98%
Reform	Stephen Wood (incumbent)	4,589	16.02%
Total votes		28,652	100%
Republican gain from Reform			
