= Dante Pittman =

American politician from North Carolina

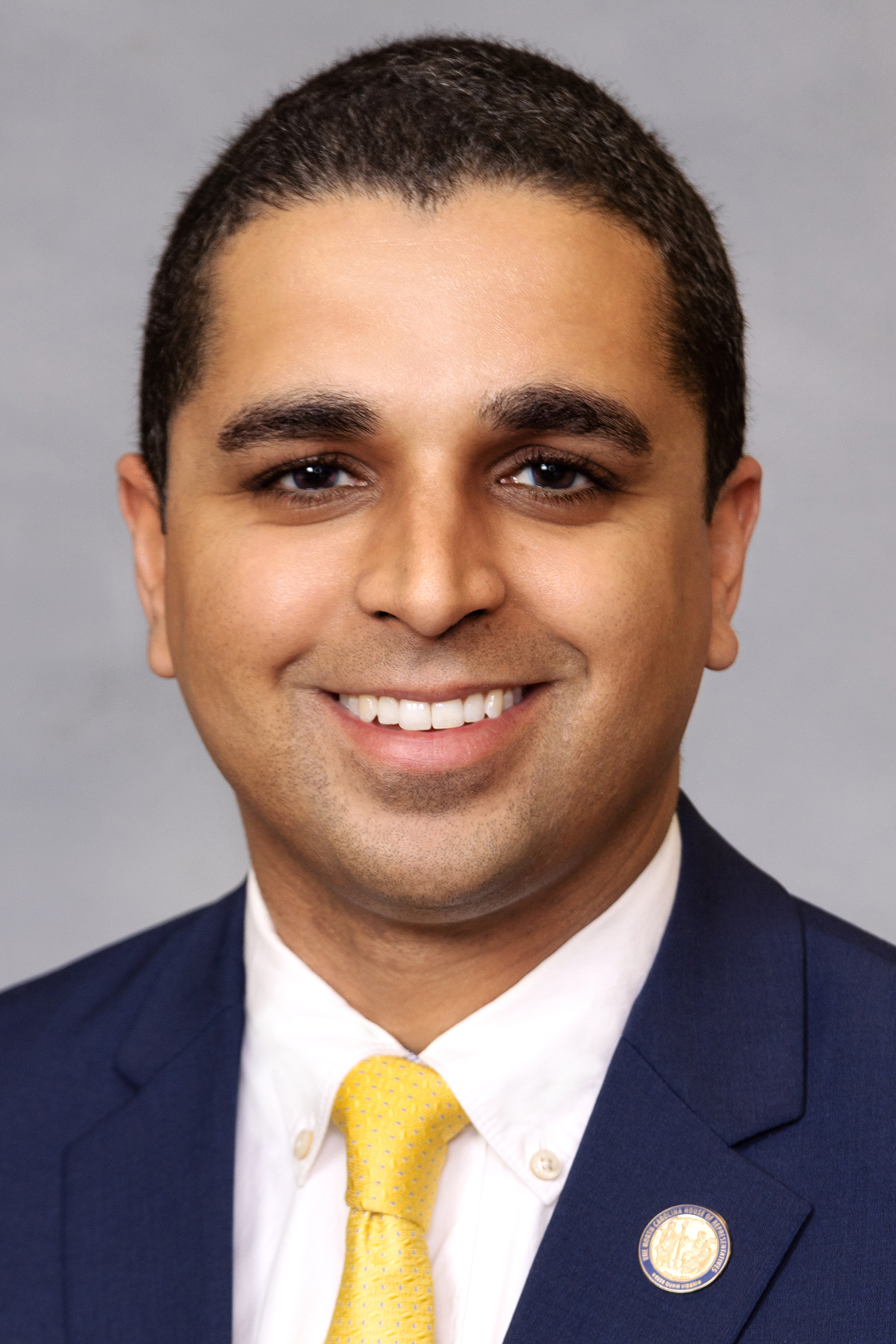

Member of the North Carolina House of Representatives from the 24th district
- Incumbent
- Assumed office January 1, 2025
- Preceded by: Ken Fontenot

Personal details
- Party: Democratic
- Spouse: Lucy Russell Pittman
- Education: Fike High School
- Alma mater: University of North Carolina at Chapel Hill (BA)

Military service
- Branch/service: United States Army; North Carolina Army National Guard
- Rank: Captain

Dante Pittman is an American politician serving as a member of the North Carolina House of Representatives from the 24th district.

== Personal life ==
Pittman is a native of Wilson County and went to Fike High School.

== Professional career ==
Pittman previously served as the human relations director for the City of Wilson. He is now a grant writer for Barton College.

Pittman also serves as a captain in the North Carolina National Guard.

== Electoral history ==
=== 2024 ===
North Carolina House of Representatives 24th district general election, 2024
Party	Candidate	Votes	%
Democratic	Dante Pittman	21,343	51.10%
Republican	Ken Fontenot (incumbent)	20,425	48.90%
Total votes		41,768	100%
Democratic gain from Republican			

North Carolina House of Representatives
Preceded by Ken Fontenot	Member of the North Carolina House of Representatives from the 24th district 2025–Present	Incumbent
