= North Carolina's 78th House district =

American legislative district

North Carolina's 78th State House of Representatives district
Representative
| Neal Jackson; R–Robbins |
- Demographics: 80% White; 4% Black; 11% Hispanic; 1% Asian; 4% Multiracial
- Population (2024): 90,702

North Carolina's 78th House district is one of 120 districts in the North Carolina House of Representatives. It has been represented by Republican Neal Jackson since 2023.

== Geography ==
Since 2013, the district has included parts of Randolph and Moore counties. The district overlaps with the 21st, 25th, and 29th Senate districts.

== District officeholders ==
| Representative | Party | Dates | Notes | Counties |
|---|---|---|---|---|
District created January 1, 1993.
| James Preston Green (Henderson) | Democratic | January 1, 1993 – January 1, 1995 | Redistricted from the 22nd district. Retired. | 1993–2003; Parts of Granville, Vance, and Warren counties. |
| Stanley Fox (Oxford) | Democratic | January 1, 1995 – January 1, 2003 | Redistricted to the 27th district. | 1993–2003; Parts of Granville, Vance, and Warren counties. |
| Harold Brubaker (Asheboro) | Republican | January 1, 2003 – July 12, 2012 | Redistricted from the 38th district. Resigned. | 2003–2013; Part of Randolph County. |
| Vacant | | July 12, 2012 – August 13, 2012 | | 2003–2013; Part of Randolph County. |
| Allen McNeill (Asheboro) | Republican | August 13, 2012 – January 1, 2023 | Appointed to finish Brubaker's term. Retired. | 2003–2013; Part of Randolph County. |
| Allen McNeill (Asheboro) | Republican | August 13, 2012 – January 1, 2023 | Appointed to finish Brubaker's term. Retired. | 2013–Present; Parts of Randolph and Moore counties. |
| Neal Jackson (Robbins) | Republican | January 1, 2023 – Present | | 2013–Present; Parts of Randolph and Moore counties. |

== Election results ==
=== 2026 ===
North Carolina House of Representatives 78th district Republican primary election, 2026
| Party | Candidate | Votes | % |
|---|---|---|---|
| Republican | Neal Jackson (incumbent) | 8,450 | 72.00% |
| Republican | Mark Dutton | 3,286 | 28.00% |
| Total votes | | 11,736 | 100% |

North Carolina House of Representatives 78th district general election, 2026
| Party | Candidate | Votes | % |
|---|---|---|---|
| Republican | Neal Jackson (incumbent) | | |
| Democratic | Matt Borja | | |
| Total votes | | | 100% |

=== 2024 ===
North Carolina House of Representatives 78th district general election, 2024
| Party | Candidate | Votes | % |
|---|---|---|---|
| Republican | Neal Jackson (incumbent) | 38,928 | 76.46% |
| Democratic | Lowell Simon | 11,985 | 23.54% |
| Total votes | | 50,913 | 100% |
| Republican hold | | | |

=== 2022 ===
North Carolina House of Representatives 78th district Republican primary election, 2022
| Party | Candidate | Votes | % |
|---|---|---|---|
| Republican | Neal Jackson | 8,449 | 67.06% |
| Republican | David Ashley | 2,194 | 17.41% |
| Republican | Cory Bortree | 1,956 | 15.53% |
| Total votes | | 12,599 | 100% |

North Carolina House of Representatives 78th district general election, 2022
| Party | Candidate | Votes | % |
|---|---|---|---|
| Republican | Neal Jackson | 27,787 | 76.55% |
| Democratic | Erik Davis | 8,510 | 23.45% |
| Total votes | | 36,297 | 100% |
| Republican hold | | | |

=== 2020 ===
North Carolina House of Representatives 78th district general election, 2020
| Party | Candidate | Votes | % |
|---|---|---|---|
| Republican | Allen McNeill (incumbent) | 33,593 | 100% |
| Total votes | | 33,593 | 100% |
| Republican hold | | | |

=== 2018 ===
North Carolina House of Representatives 78th district general election, 2018
| Party | Candidate | Votes | % |
|---|---|---|---|
| Republican | Allen McNeill (incumbent) | 20,829 | 78.78% |
| Democratic | Jim Meredith | 5,612 | 21.22% |
| Total votes | | 26,441 | 100% |
| Republican hold | | | |

=== 2016 ===
North Carolina House of Representatives 78th district general election, 2016
| Party | Candidate | Votes | % |
|---|---|---|---|
| Republican | Allen McNeill (incumbent) | 27,040 | 78.11% |
| Democratic | William "Bill" McCaskill | 7,579 | 21.89% |
| Total votes | | 34,619 | 100% |
| Republican hold | | | |

=== 2014 ===
North Carolina House of Representatives 78th district general election, 2014
| Party | Candidate | Votes | % |
|---|---|---|---|
| Republican | Allen McNeill (incumbent) | 17,102 | 100% |
| Total votes | | 17,102 | 100% |
| Republican hold | | | |

=== 2012 ===
North Carolina House of Representatives 78th district general election, 2012
| Party | Candidate | Votes | % |
|---|---|---|---|
| Republican | Allen McNeill (incumbent) | 24,880 | 75.05% |
| Democratic | Gerald C. Parker | 8,272 | 24.95% |
| Total votes | | 33,152 | 100% |
| Republican hold | | | |

=== 2010 ===
North Carolina House of Representatives 78th district Republican primary election, 2010
| Party | Candidate | Votes | % |
|---|---|---|---|
| Republican | Harold Brubaker (incumbent) | 3,351 | 62.67% |
| Republican | Arnold Lanier | 1,996 | 37.33% |
| Total votes | | 5,347 | 100% |

North Carolina House of Representatives 78th district general election, 2010
| Party | Candidate | Votes | % |
|---|---|---|---|
| Republican | Harold Brubaker (incumbent) | 13,823 | 100% |
| Total votes | | 13,823 | 100% |
| Republican hold | | | |

=== 2008 ===
North Carolina House of Representatives 78th district Republican primary election, 2008
| Party | Candidate | Votes | % |
|---|---|---|---|
| Republican | Harold Brubaker (incumbent) | 4,564 | 79.99% |
| Republican | Greg Sumner | 854 | 14.97% |
| Republican | James Stegenga | 288 | 5.05% |
| Total votes | | 5,706 | 100% |

North Carolina House of Representatives 78th district general election, 2008
| Party | Candidate | Votes | % |
|---|---|---|---|
| Republican | Harold Brubaker (incumbent) | 22,438 | 100% |
| Total votes | | 22,438 | 100% |
| Republican hold | | | |

=== 2006 ===
North Carolina House of Representatives 78th district general election, 2006
| Party | Candidate | Votes | % |
|---|---|---|---|
| Republican | Harold Brubaker (incumbent) | 10,472 | 100% |
| Total votes | | 10,472 | 100% |
| Republican hold | | | |

=== 2004 ===
North Carolina House of Representatives 78th district general election, 2004
| Party | Candidate | Votes | % |
|---|---|---|---|
| Republican | Harold Brubaker (incumbent) | 20,756 | 100% |
| Total votes | | 20,756 | 100% |
| Republican hold | | | |

=== 2002 ===
North Carolina House of Representatives 78th district general election, 2002
| Party | Candidate | Votes | % |
|---|---|---|---|
| Republican | Harold Brubaker (incumbent) | 13,059 | 90.74% |
| Libertarian | Don Blair | 1,332 | 9.26% |
| Total votes | | 14,391 | 100% |
| Republican hold | | | |

=== 2000 ===
North Carolina House of Representatives 78th district Democratic primary election, 2000
| Party | Candidate | Votes | % |
|---|---|---|---|
| Democratic | Stanley Fox (incumbent) | 4,868 | 61.31% |
| Democratic | Richard M. Henderson | 3,072 | 38.69% |
| Total votes | | 7,940 | 100% |

North Carolina House of Representatives 78th district general election, 2000
| Party | Candidate | Votes | % |
|---|---|---|---|
| Democratic | Stanley Fox (incumbent) | 16,287 | 100% |
| Total votes | | 16,287 | 100% |
| Democratic hold | | | |
