= Neal Jackson (North Carolina politician) =

American politician

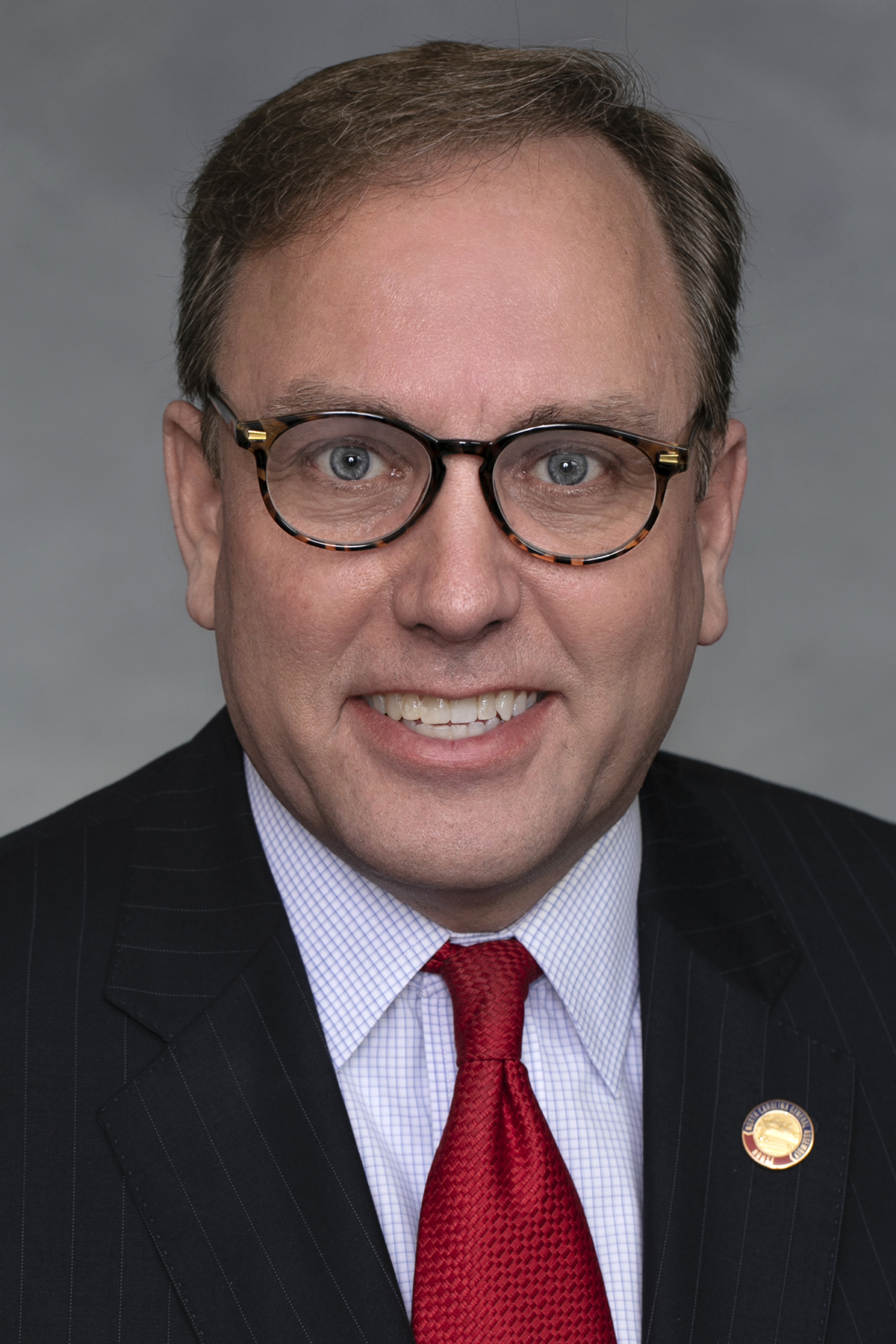
- Jackson in 2023

Member of the North Carolina House of Representatives from the 78th district
- Incumbent
- Assumed office January 1, 2023
- Preceded by: Allen McNeill

Personal details
- Born: Maze O'Neal Jackson Pinehurst, North Carolina, U.S.
- Party: Republican
- Spouse: Tracy
- Children: 5
- Occupation: Business Owner and Pastor
- Website: Official website

Maze O'Neal "Neal" Jackson is an American politician. He serves as a Republican member for the 78th district of the North Carolina House of Representatives.

== Life and career ==
Jackson was born in Pinehurst, North Carolina. In May 2022, Jackson defeated David Ashley and Cory Bortree in the Republican primary election for the 78th district of the North Carolina House of Representatives. In November 2022, he defeated Erik Davis in the general election, winning 76 percent of the votes. He assumed office in 2023.

== Committee assignments ==
=== 2023–2024 session ===
- Banking
- Education–Universities
- Finance
- Rules, Calendar, and Operations of the House
- State Personnel

== Electoral history ==
=== 2022 ===
North Carolina House of Representatives 78th district Republican primary election, 2022
Party	Candidate	Votes	%
Republican	Neal Jackson	8,449	67.06%
Republican	David Ashley	2,194	17.41%
Republican	Cory Bortree	1,956	15.53%
Total votes		12,599	100%

North Carolina House of Representatives 78th district general election, 2022
Party	Candidate	Votes	%
Republican	Neal Jackson	27,787	76.55%
Democratic	Erik Davis	8,510	23.45%
Total votes		36,297	100%
Republican hold			

North Carolina House of Representatives
Preceded by Allen McNeill	Member of the North Carolina House of Representatives from the 78th district 2023–Present	Incumbent
