= Stanley H. Fox =

American politician

Member of the North Carolina House of Representatives
- In office January 1, 1995 – January 1, 2005
- Preceded by: James Preston Green
- Succeeded by: Michael Wray
- Constituency: 78th District (1995-2003); 27th District (2003-2005)

Personal details
- Born: Stanley Harold Fox; January 7, 1929 Oxford, North Carolina, U.S.
- Died: April 11, 2019 (aged 90) Oxford, North Carolina, U.S.
- Party: Democratic
- Education: University of North Carolina at Chapel Hill, Davidson College
- Profession: businessman

Stanley Harold Fox (January 7, 1929 – April 11, 2019) was a Democratic member of the North Carolina General Assembly representing the state's twenty-seventh House district, including constituents in Granville, Vance and Warren counties. A businessman from Oxford, North Carolina, Fox served five terms in the state House. He later served on the Board of Trustees of Vance-Granville Community College. He was born in Oxford, North Carolina.

North Carolina House of Representatives
Preceded by James Preston Green	Member of the North Carolina House of Representatives from the 78th district 1995–2003	Succeeded by Harold Brubaker
Preceded by John Blust	Member of the North Carolina House of Representatives from the 27th district 2003–2005	Succeeded by Michael Wray
