= Harold J. Brubaker =

American politician from North Carolina

Harold Brubaker
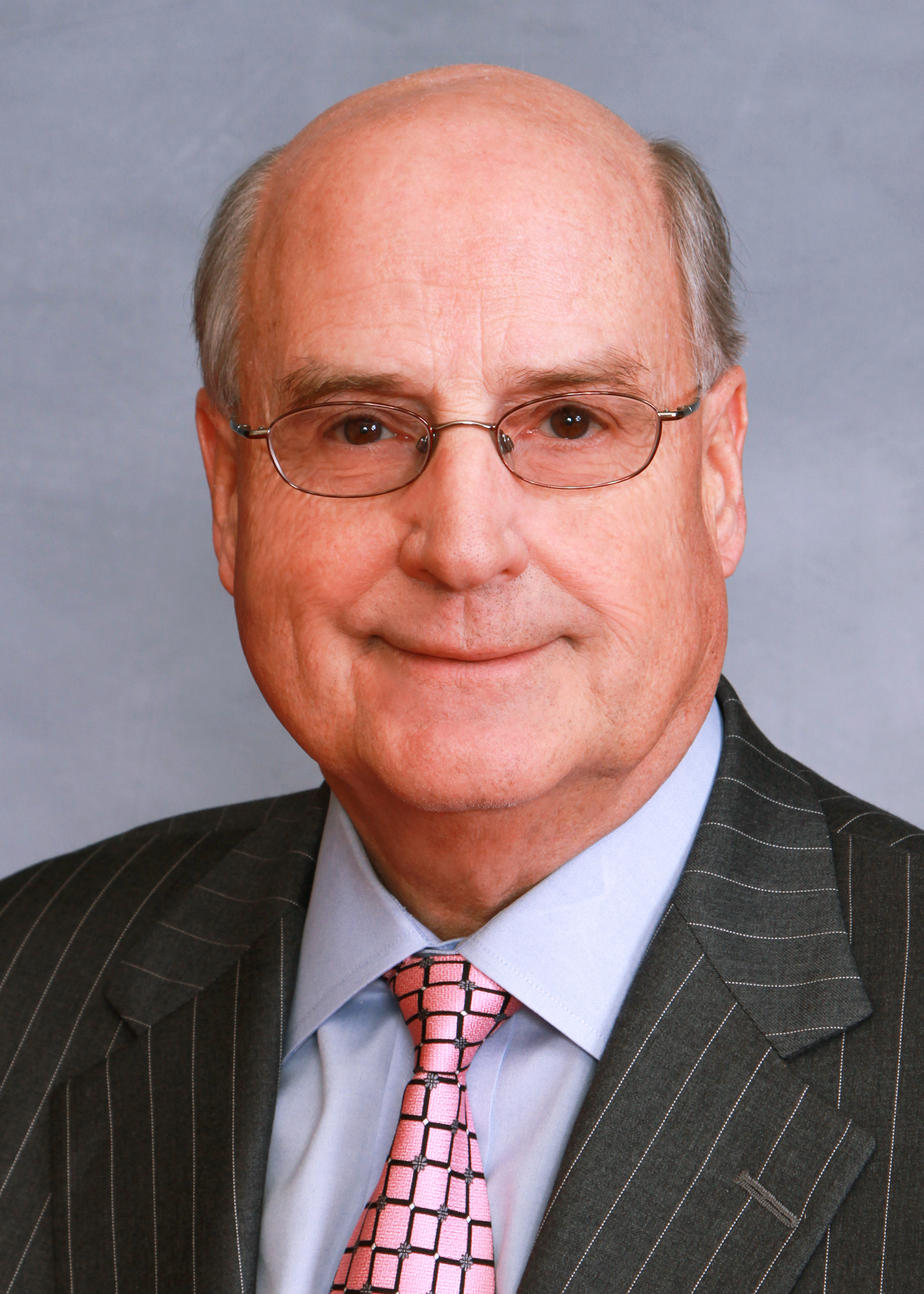

Speaker of the North Carolina House of Representatives
- In office January 1, 1995 – January 1, 1999
- Preceded by: Dan Blue
- Succeeded by: Jim Black

Member of the North Carolina House of Representatives
- In office January 1, 1977 – July 12, 2012
- Preceded by: Gilbert Ray Davis
- Succeeded by: Allen Ray McNeill
- Constituency: 24th District (1977-1983); 38th District (1983-2003); 78th District (2003-2012)

Personal details
- Born: November 11, 1946 (age 79); Asheboro, North Carolina, U.S.
- Party: Republican
- Occupation: Real estate appraiser and cattle breeder and economist

Harold J. Brubaker is a Republican politician who served in the North Carolina General Assembly. He represented the state's seventy-eighth House district, including constituents in Randolph County, for 35 years. He resigned in 2012 with plans to become a lobbyist. At the time he was the longest-serving sitting member of the House.

He was born and grew up in Lancaster County, Pennsylvania.

Brubaker was Speaker of the House for two terms (1995–1998). He was the only Republican Speaker in North Carolina in the twentieth century, the first Republican speaker since Zeb V. Walser (1895) and the first non-Democrat to be speaker since Populist A. F. Hileman (1897).

A real estate appraiser and cattle breeder from Asheboro, North Carolina, Brubaker was first elected to the House in 1976 and in 2011 became chairman of the House Appropriations Committee.

He is a board member and chairman emeritus of the American Legislative Exchange Council (ALEC).

== Election history ==
2010

North Carolina House of Representatives District 49, November 2, 2010
Party	Candidate	Votes	%
Republican	Harold Brubaker	13,823	100

== Controversies ==
In 1989, The New York Times reported that Brubaker was paid $10,000 to assist developers in Durham, North Carolina, regarding a real estate project that drew scrutiny from authorities. The project involved converting a hosiery mill into homes for the elderly, and caused concern when subordinates had reportedly been against the project, but funds were appropriated nevertheless.

North Carolina House of Representatives
Preceded by Gilbert Ray Davis	Member of the North Carolina House of Representatives from the 24th district 1977–1983; Served alongside: Jesse Thomas Pugh Jr., William Frank Redding III	Succeeded by Anne Craig Barnes; Joe Hackney
Preceded by Sam Lee Beam; E. Graham Bell; David Webster Bumgardner Jr. David Rudisill Mauney Jr.	Member of the North Carolina House of Representatives from the 38th district 1983–2003	Succeeded by Deborah Ross
Preceded by Stanley Fox	Member of the North Carolina House of Representatives from the 78th district 2003–2012	Succeeded by Allen Ray McNeill
Political offices
Preceded by Dan Blue	Speaker of the North Carolina House of Representatives; 1995–1999	Succeeded by Jim Black
