= Rodney D. Pierce =

American politician from North Carolina

Rodney Pierce
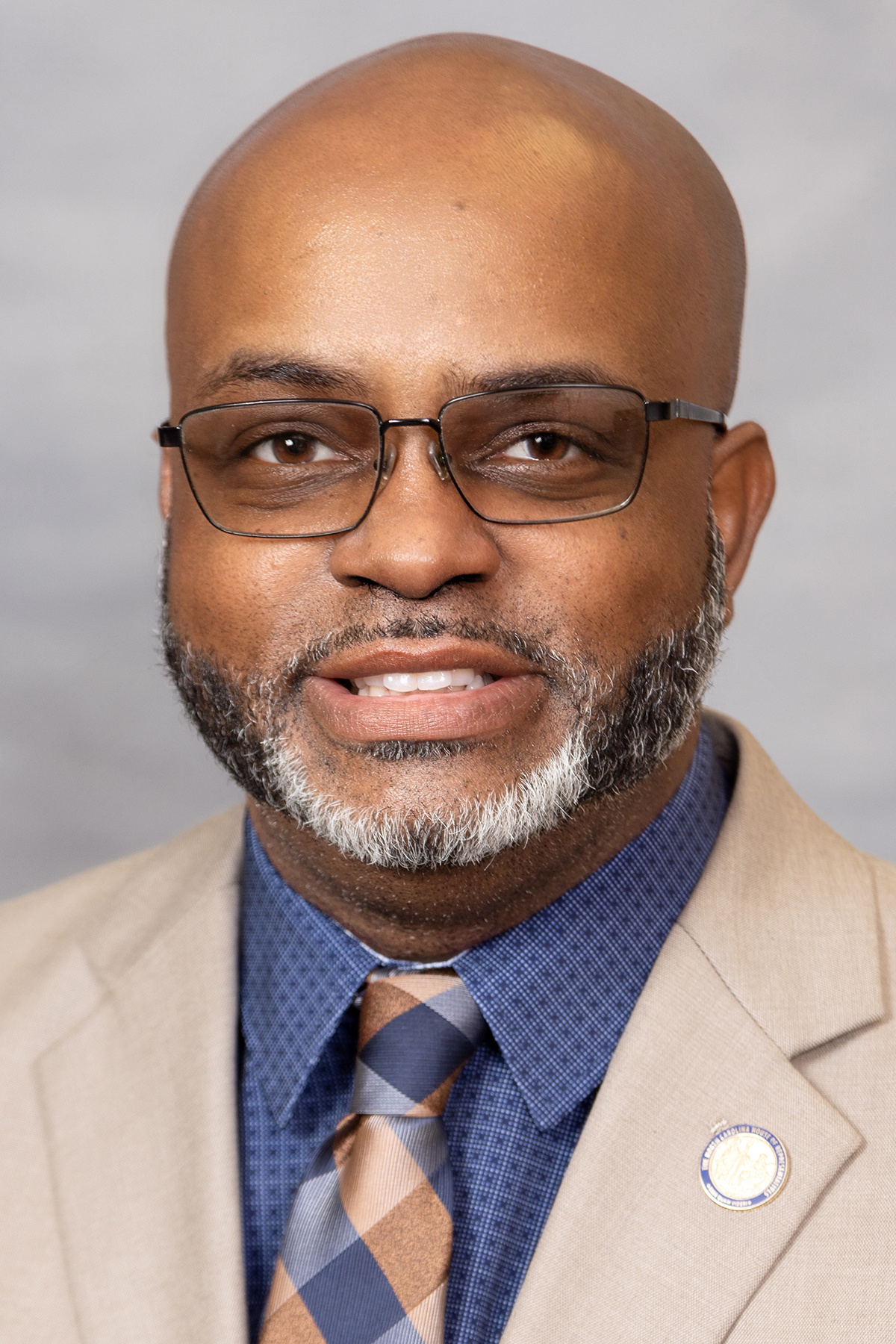

Member of the North Carolina House of Representatives from the 27th district
- Incumbent
- Assumed office January 1, 2025
- Preceded by: Michael Wray

Personal details
- Born: Rodney Donte Pierce; October 5, 1978 (age 48) Roanoke Rapids, North Carolina, U.S.
- Party: Democratic
- Education: AA, Halifax Community College; BA, North Carolina Wesleyan University; Teaching Licensure, East Carolina University

Rodney Donte Pierce is an American teacher and politician serving as the member of the North Carolina House of Representatives from the 27th district.

== Personal life ==
Pierce is a native of Halifax County and grew up in Roanoke Rapids. He has three children.

== Career ==
Pierce is a professional educator who was named the North Carolina Council for the Social Studies Teacher of the Year in 2019 and was one of the Marathon Teaching Institute's African American Male Teachers of the Year in 2022.

He also served on the North Carolina Governor's Teacher Advisory Committee.

In 2024, he defeated Michael Wray in the Democratic primary to represent a seat in the North Carolina House of Representatives. In 2026, he won a primary rematch against Wray.

== Electoral history ==
=== 2024 ===
North Carolina House of Representatives 27th district Democratic primary election, 2024
Party	Candidate	Votes	%
Democratic	Rodney Pierce	5,986	50.14%
Democratic	Michael Wray (incumbent)	5,952	49.86%
Total votes		11,937	100%

North Carolina House of Representatives 27th district general election, 2024
Party	Candidate	Votes	%
Democratic	Rodney Pierce	31,914	100%
Total votes		31,914	100%
Democratic hold			

North Carolina House of Representatives
Preceded by Michael Wray	Member of the North Carolina House of Representatives from the 27th district 2025–Present	Incumbent
