= Michael H. Wray =

American politician (born 1967)

Michael Wray
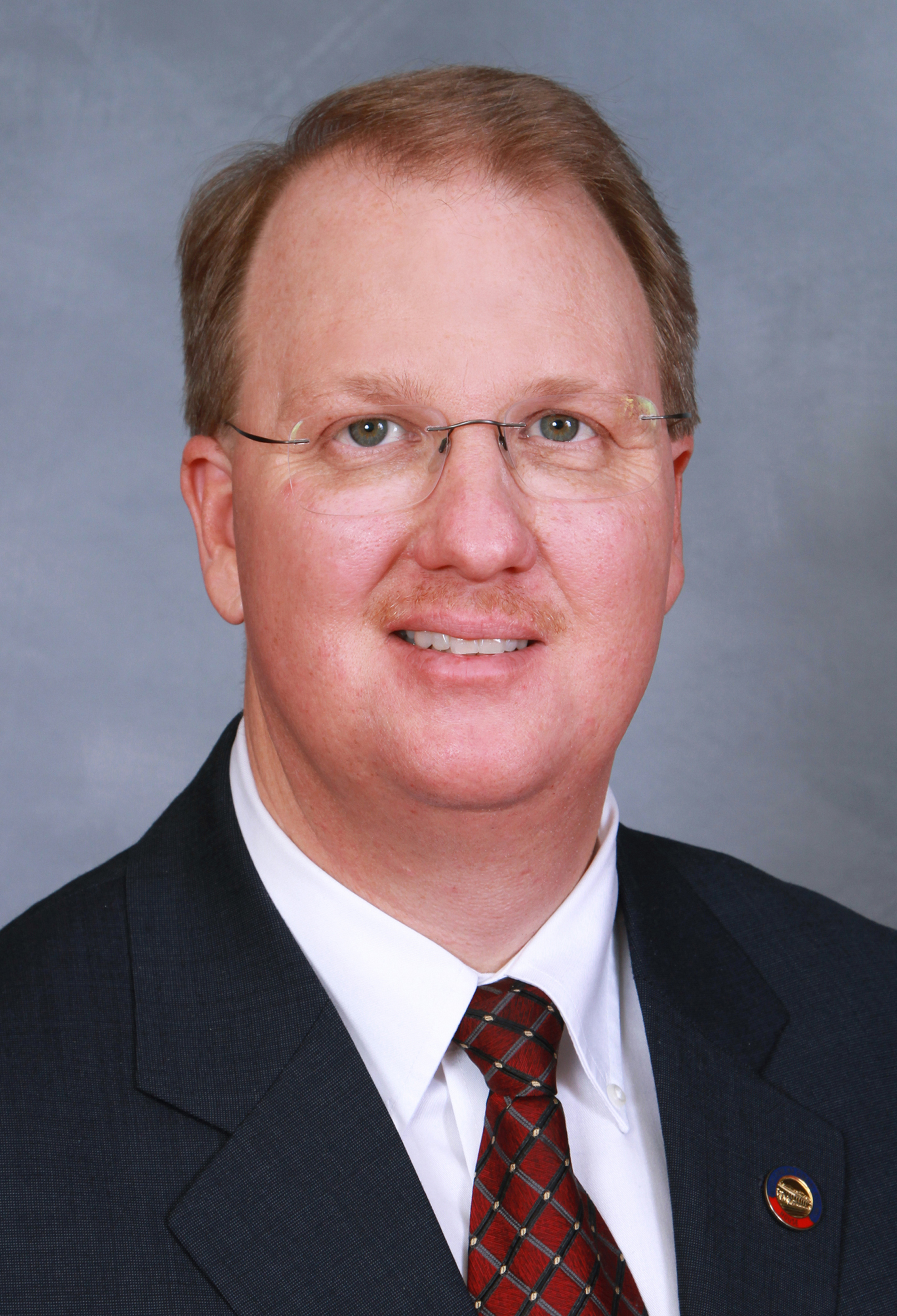

Member of the North Carolina House of Representatives from the 27th district
- In office January 1, 2005 – January 1, 2025
- Preceded by: Stanley Fox
- Succeeded by: Rodney Pierce

Personal details
- Born: Michael H. Wray; April 6, 1967 (age 59) Roanoke Rapids, North Carolina, U.S.
- Party: Democratic
- Spouse: Kay
- Children: 2
- Education: Barton College (BA)
- Occupation: small business owner

Michael H. Wray (born April 6, 1967) is a Democratic former member of the North Carolina House of Representatives. Wray represented the 27th district (including constituents in Halifax and Northampton counties) from 2005 until 2025. Wray is also a small business owner in Gaston, North Carolina.

In 2026, Wray sought to regain his former seat in the North Carolina House of Representatives but was soundly defeated in the Democratic primary by incumbent Rodney Pierce, who won the rematch with approximately 64% of the vote.

== North Carolina House of Representatives ==
A former Gaston town commissioner, Wray was first elected to the North Carolina House of Representatives in 2004.

He had been re-elected a total of 8 times defeating both primary and general election challengers, before being defeated in the 2024 Democratic primary by public school teacher Rodney Pierce.

Wray was a founding member of the North Carolina Legislative Sportsmen's Caucus in 2011 and serves as the group's Democratic Co-chair in the House. In 2015, Wray became a charter member of the Main Street Democrats Caucus in the North Carolina General Assembly. The Main Street Democrats describe themselves as pro-business, moderate Democrats.

During the 2016 legislative session, Wray was one of 11 Democrats to vote in favor of House Bill 2, the controversial "Bathroom Bill."

== Committee assignments ==
=== 2023–2024 Session ===
- Ethics (chair)
- Finance (Senior Chair)
- Agriculture (Vice Chair)
- Alcoholic Beverage Control
- Energy and Public Utilities
- Health
- Insurance
- Rules, Calendar, and Operations of the House
- Wildlife Resources

=== 2021–2022 Session ===
- Ethics (chair)
- Finance (chair)
- Agriculture (Vice Chair)
- Energy and Public Utilities
- Health
- Insurance
- Rules, Calendar, and Operations of the House

=== 2019–2020 Session ===
- Appropriations
- Appropriations - Agriculture and Natural and Economic Resources
- Ethics (chair)
- Agriculture (Vice Chair)
- Energy and Public Utilities
- Health
- Insurance
- Rules, Calendar, and Operations of the House

=== 2017–2018 Session ===
- Appropriations
- Appropriations - Agriculture and Natural and Economic Resources
- Energy and Public Utilities
- Health
- Insurance
- Rules, Calendar, and Operations of the House
- Health Care Reform
- Wildlife Resources
- University Board of Governors Nominating
- Transportation

=== 2015–2016 Session ===
- Appropriations
- Appropriations - Agriculture and Natural and Economic Resources
- Commerce and Job Development (Vice Chair)
- Ethics
- Health
- Insurance
- Public Utilities
- Rules, Calendar, and Operations of the House
- Education - Universities
- Wildlife Resources
- Committee on Chowanoke Nation Recognition (Non-Standing)
- Joint Legislative Commission on Governmental Operations (Non-Standing)
- Joint Legislative Oversight Committee on Health and Human Services (Non-Standing)
- Committee on Land Development (Non-Standing)

=== 2013–2014 Session ===
- Appropriations
- Commerce and Job Development
- Health and Human Services
- Insurance
- Public Utilities
- Environment

=== 2011–2012 Session ===
- Appropriations
- Commerce and Job Development
- Health and Human Services
- Insurance
- Public Utilities

=== 2009–2010 Session ===
- Appropriations
- Agriculture
- Commerce, Small Business, and Entrepreneurship
- Insurance
- Transportation
- Wildlife Resources

== Electoral history ==
=== 2024 ===
North Carolina House of Representatives 27th district Democratic primary election, 2024
Party	Candidate	Votes	%
Democratic	Rodney Pierce	5,986	50.14%
Democratic	Michael Wray (incumbent)	5,952	49.86%
Total votes		11,937	100%

=== 2022 ===
North Carolina House of Representatives 27th district Democratic primary election, 2022
Party	Candidate	Votes	%
Democratic	Michael Wray (incumbent)	10,866	79.00%
Democratic	Jerry McDaniel	2,889	21.00%
Total votes		13,755	100%

North Carolina House of Representatives 27th district general election, 2022
Party	Candidate	Votes	%
Democratic	Michael Wray (incumbent)	18,116	61.44%
Republican	Wes Tripp	11,370	38.56%
Total votes		29,486	100%
Democratic hold			

=== 2020 ===
North Carolina House of Representatives 27th district Democratic primary election, 2020
Party	Candidate	Votes	%
Democratic	Michael Wray (incumbent)	6,856	55.75%
Democratic	Kelby Hicks	4,536	36.89%
Democratic	Jerry McDaniel	905	7.36%
Total votes		12,297	100%

North Carolina House of Representatives 27th district general election, 2020
Party	Candidate	Votes	%
Democratic	Michael Wray (incumbent)	23,169	66.78%
Republican	Warren Scott Nail	11,527	33.22%
Total votes		34,696	100%
Democratic hold			

=== 2018 ===
North Carolina House of Representatives 27th district Democratic primary election, 2018
Party	Candidate	Votes	%
Democratic	Michael Wray (incumbent)	7,319	56.15%
Democratic	Franklin D. Williams Jr.	5,716	43.85%
Total votes		13,035	100%

North Carolina House of Representatives 27th district general election, 2018
Party	Candidate	Votes	%
Democratic	Michael Wray (incumbent)	16,783	69.33%
Republican	Raymond (Ray) Dyer	7,426	30.67%
Total votes		24,209	100%
Democratic hold			

=== 2016 ===
Wray was challenged in the Democratic primary by Franklin D. Williams Jr. Wray won the primary and was unopposed in the general election.

North Carolina House of Representatives 27th district Democratic primary election, 2016
Party	Candidate	Votes	%
Democratic	Michael Wray (incumbent)	7,418	52.39%
Democratic	Franklin D. Williams Jr.	6,741	47.61%
Total votes		14,159	100%

North Carolina House of Representatives 27th district general election, 2016
Party	Candidate	Votes	%
Democratic	Michael Wray (incumbent)	29,200	100%
Total votes		29,200	100%
Democratic hold			

=== 2014 ===
Wray was challenged in the Democratic primary by Franklin D. Williams Jr. Wray won the primary and was unopposed in the general election.

North Carolina House of Representatives 27th district Democratic primary election, 2014
Party	Candidate	Votes	%
Democratic	Michael Wray (incumbent)	8,458	57.97%
Democratic	Franklin D. Williams Jr.	6,132	42.03%
Total votes		14,590	100%

North Carolina House of Representatives 27th district general election, 2014
Party	Candidate	Votes	%
Democratic	Michael Wray (incumbent)	17,446	100%
Total votes		17,446	100%
Democratic hold			

=== 2012 ===
Wray was challenged in the May 8, 2012 Democratic primary by James Mills. Wray won the primary and defeated Libertarian candidate Jesse Shearin in the general election.

North Carolina House of Representatives 27th district Democratic primary election, 2012
Party	Candidate	Votes	%
Democratic	Michael Wray (incumbent)	9,052	61.71%
Democratic	James Mills	5,616	38.29%
Total votes		14,668	100%

North Carolina House of representatives 27th district general election, 2012
Party	Candidate	Votes	%
Democratic	Michael Wray (incumbent)	29,714	90.94%
Libertarian	Jesse Shearin	2,960	9.06%
Total votes		32,674	100%
Democratic hold			

=== 2010 ===
Wray was unopposed in the Democratic primary and the general election.

North Carolina House of Representatives 27th district general election, 2010
Party	Candidate	Votes	%
Democratic	Michael Wray (incumbent)	17,701	100%
Total votes		17,701	100%
Democratic hold			

=== 2008 ===
Wray was unopposed in the Democratic primary and the general election.

North Carolina House of Representatives 27th district general election, 2008
Party	Candidate	Votes	%
Democratic	Michael Wray (incumbent)	27,387	100%
Total votes		27,387	100%
Democratic hold			

=== 2006 ===
Wray was challenged in the Democratic primary by Anthony Butler and Howard Ervin. Wray won the primary and was unopposed in the general election.

North Carolina House of Representatives 27th district Democratic primary election, 2006
Party	Candidate	Votes	%
Democratic	Michael Wray (incumbent)	8,551	76.71%
Democratic	Anthony Butler	1,878	16.85%
Democratic	Howard Ervin	718	6.44%
Total votes			100%

North Carolina House of Representatives 27th district general election, 2006
Party	Candidate	Votes	%
Democratic	Michael Wray (incumbent)	13,839	100%
Total votes		13,839	100%
Democratic hold			

=== 2004 ===
Wray was one of five candidates to seek the Democratic nomination to fill the vacant District 27 seat in 2004. Other Democratic primary candidates were Richard M. Henderson, Grace M. Edwards, John Soles, and Julius O. Webb. Wray finished second behind Henderson but finished ahead of Henderson in the subsequent runoff election.

North Carolina House of Representatives 27th district Democratic primary election, 2004
Party	Candidate	Votes	%
Democratic	Richard M. Henderson	2,882	29.31%
Democratic	Michael Wray	2,874	29.23%
Democratic	Grace M. Edwards	2,290	23.29%
Democratic	John Soles	1,586	16.13%
Democratic	Julius O. Webb	200	2.03%
Total votes		9,832	100%

North Carolina House of Representatives 27th district Democratic primary run-off election, 2004
Party	Candidate	Votes	%
Democratic	Michael Wray	2,982	51.36%
Democratic	Richard M. Henderson	2,824	48.64%
Total votes		5,806	100%

North Carolina House of Representatives 27th district general election, 2004
Party	Candidate	Votes	%
Democratic	Michael Wray	21,237	100%
Total votes		21,237	100%
Democratic hold			

North Carolina House of Representatives
Preceded by Stanley Fox	Member of the North Carolina House of Representatives from the 27th district 2005–2025	Succeeded by Rodney Pierce
