= Linda Cooper-Suggs =

American politician from North Carolina (born 1953)

Representative Linda Cooper-Suggs
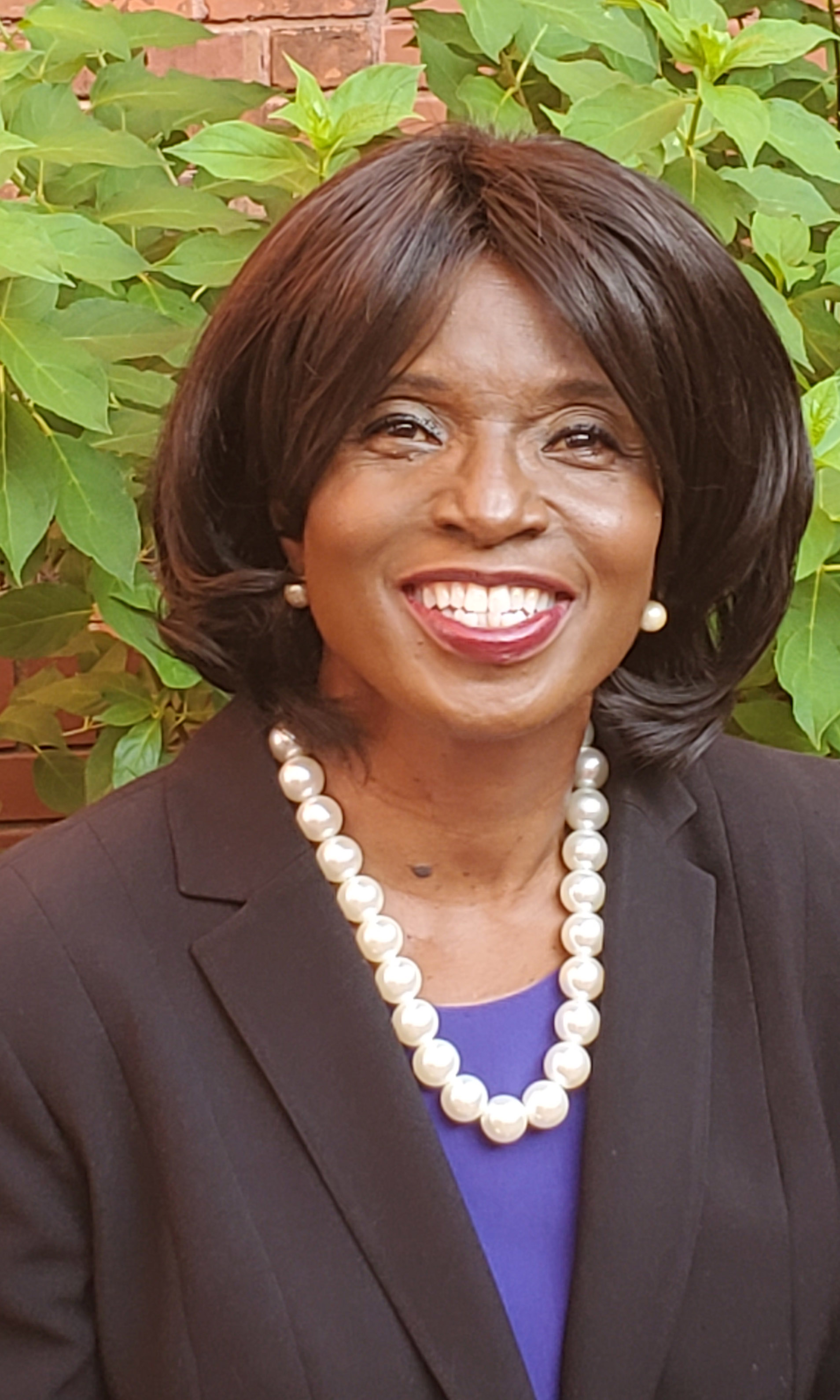

Member of the North Carolina House of Representatives from the 24th district
- In office July 27, 2020 – January 1, 2023
- Preceded by: Jean Farmer-Butterfield
- Succeeded by: Ken Fontenot

Personal details
- Born: 1953 (age 72–73)
- Party: Democratic
- Education: North Carolina A&T State University (BA); East Carolina University (MA)
- Occupation: Educator

Linda Darnell Cooper-Suggs (born 1953) is an American politician. She is a former Democratic member of the North Carolina House of Representatives. She has represented the 24th district (composed of all of Wilson County) from 2020 to 2023.

== Career ==
Cooper-Suggs was selected by Democratic party activists from Wilson County on July 25, 2020 to represent the 24th House district, a vacancy left by the resignation of Jean Farmer-Butterfield. Her appointment was approved by North Carolina governor Roy Cooper on July 27, 2020. She ran for the same office in November 2020 and won the election on 3 November 2020 from the platform of Democratic Party. She secured fifty-three percent of the vote while her closest rival Republican Mick Rankin secured forty-seven percent.

== Electoral history ==
=== 2022 ===
North Carolina House of Representatives 24th district general election, 2022
Party	Candidate	Votes	%
Republican	Ken Fontenot	15,121	54.22%
Democratic	Linda Cooper-Suggs (incumbent)	12,768	45.78%
Total votes		27,889	100%
Republican gain from Democratic			

=== 2020 ===
North Carolina House of Representatives 24th district general election, 2020
Party	Candidate	Votes	%
Democratic	Linda Cooper-Suggs (incumbent)	20,928	52.60%
Republican	Mick Rankin	18,856	47.40%
Total votes		39,784	100%
Democratic hold			

== Committee assignments ==
=== 2021-2022 session ===
- Appropriations
- Appropriations - Health and Human Services
- Families, Children, and Aging Policy
- Health
- Redistricting

North Carolina House of Representatives
Preceded by Jean Farmer-Butterfield	Member of the North Carolina House of Representatives from the 24th district 2020–2023	Succeeded by Ken Fontenot
