= Allen McNeill =

American politician

Representative Allen McNeill
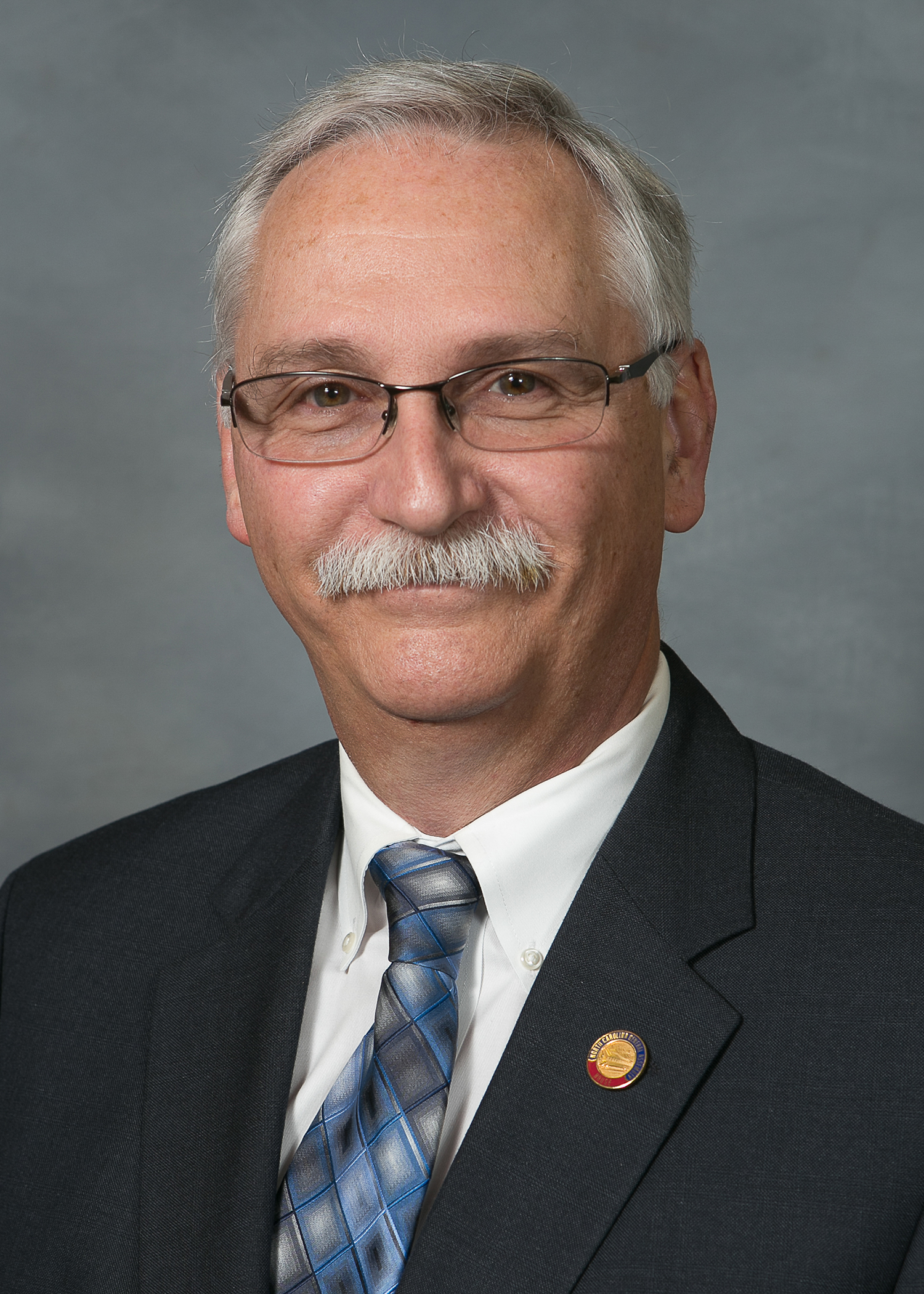

Member of the North Carolina House of Representatives from the 78th district
- In office August 13, 2012 – January 1, 2023
- Preceded by: Harold Brubaker
- Succeeded by: Neal Jackson

Personal details
- Born: Allen Ray McNeill; September 28, 1951 (age 75)
- Party: Republican
- Education: Guilford Technical Community College (AAS)

Allen Ray McNeill (born September 28, 1951) is a former Republican member of the North Carolina House of Representatives. He represented the 78th district (including constituents in Randolph and Moore counties) from 2012 to 2023.

== Committee assignments ==
=== 2021-2022 Session ===
- Appropriations (Vice Chair)
- Appropriations - Justice and Public Safety (Chair)
- Pensions and Retirement Committee (Chair)
- Judiciary II (Vice Chair)
- Election Law and Campaign Finance Reform
- Transportation

=== 2019-2020 session ===
- Appropriations (Vice Chair)
- Appropriations - Justice and Public Safety (Chair)
- Pensions and Retirement (Chair)
- Judiciary
- Election Law and Campaign Finance Reform
- Transportation

=== 2017-2018 session ===
- Appropriations (Vice Chair)
- Appropriations - Justice and Public Safety (Chair)
- Pensions and Retirement (Chair)
- Judiciary I
- Transportation
- Commerce and Job Development
- Education - Community Colleges

=== 2015-2016 session ===
- Appropriations
- Appropriations - Justice and Public Safety (Vice Chair)
- Pensions and Retirement (Chair)
- Education - Community Colleges (Chair)
- Judiciary I
- Transportation
- Commerce and Job Development
- State Personnel

=== 2013-2014 session ===
- Appropriations
- Judiciary
- State Personnel
- Agriculture
- Government
- Elections

== Electoral history ==
=== 2020 ===
North Carolina House of Representatives 78th district general election, 2020
Party	Candidate	Votes	%
Republican	Allen McNeill (incumbent)	33,593	100%
Total votes		33,593	100%
Republican hold			

=== 2018 ===
North Carolina House of Representatives 78th district general election, 2018
Party	Candidate	Votes	%
Republican	Allen McNeill (incumbent)	20,829	78.78%
Democratic	Jim Meredith	5,612	21.22%
Total votes		26,441	100%
Republican hold			

=== 2016 ===
North Carolina House of Representatives 78th district general election, 2016
Party	Candidate	Votes	%
Republican	Allen McNeill (incumbent)	27,040	78.11%
Democratic	William "Bill" McCaskill	7,579	21.89%
Total votes		34,619	100%
Republican hold			

=== 2014 ===
North Carolina House of Representatives 78th district general election, 2014
Party	Candidate	Votes	%
Republican	Allen McNeill (incumbent)	17,102	100%
Total votes		17,102	100%
Republican hold			

=== 2012 ===
North Carolina House of Representatives 78th district general election, 2012
Party	Candidate	Votes	%
Republican	Allen McNeill (incumbent)	24,880	75.05%
Democratic	Gerald C. Parker	8,272	24.95%
Total votes		33,152	100%
Republican hold			

North Carolina House of Representatives
Preceded by Harold Brubaker	Member of the North Carolina House of Representatives from the 78th district 2012–2023	Succeeded by Neal Jackson
