= Jean Farmer-Butterfield =

American politician (born 1947)

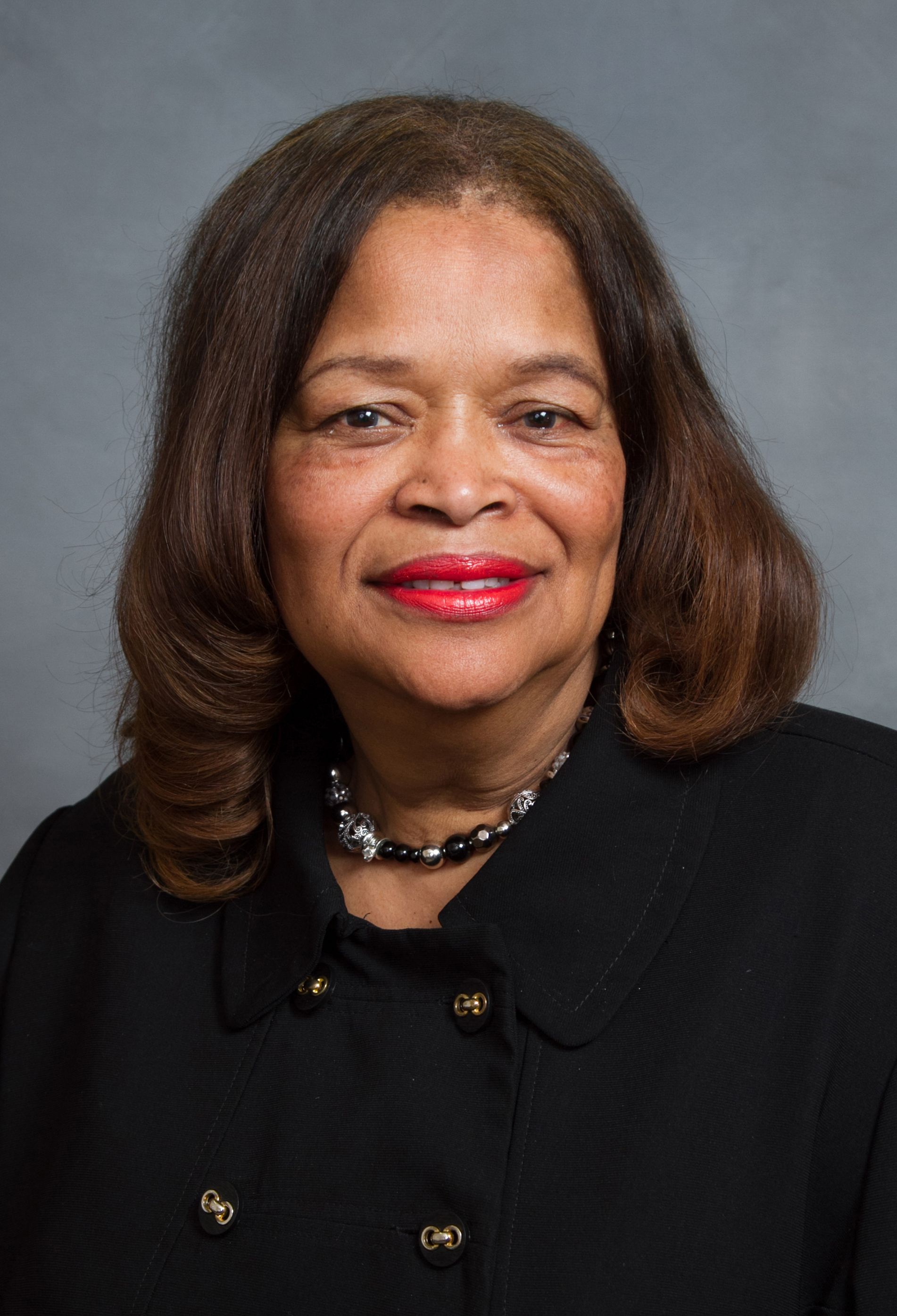

Member of the North Carolina House of Representatives from the 24th district
- In office January 29, 2003 – July 25, 2020
- Preceded by: Shelly Willingham
- Succeeded by: Linda Cooper-Suggs

Personal details
- Born: October 21, 1947 (age 78) Wilson, North Carolina, U.S.
- Party: Democratic
- Spouse: G. K. Butterfield (m. 1971; div. 1991)
- Children: 2
- Education: North Carolina Central University (BA, MA)

Jean Farmer-Butterfield (born October 21, 1947) is an American politician who served as a member of the North Carolina House of Representatives for the 24th district from January 2003 to July 2020.

== Early life and education ==
Farmer-Butterfield was born in Wilson, North Carolina. She earned a Bachelor and Master of Arts from North Carolina Central University.

== Career ==
Farmer-Butterfield has worked as a consultant and manager of non-profits in the health and human services field for many years.

Farmer-Butterfield was elected to the North Carolina House of Representatives in 2002 and assumed office in 2003. During her tenure, she served as a House majority whip from 2007 to 2011. She lost that position after the Republican Party members gained control of the North Carolina House of Representatives in the 2010 election.

In 2020, Governor Roy Cooper nominated Farmer-Butterfield to the state Employment Security Board of Review, an appointment that requires confirmation by the legislature. She was confirmed on July 8, 2020, and resigned from her seat in the House.

== Personal life ==
In 1971, Farmer-Butterfield married G. K. Butterfield, an attorney, jurist, and politician who served as a member of the United States House of Representatives from 2004 until 2022. They have two adult daughters, Valeisha Butterfield Jones and Lenai Butterfield. The couple divorced in 1991.

North Carolina House of Representatives
Preceded by Joe Hackney; Verla Insko	Member of the North Carolina House of Representatives from the 24th district 2003-2020	Succeeded by Linda Cooper-Suggs
