= North Carolina's 24th House district =

American legislative district

North Carolina's 24th State House of Representatives district
Representative
Dante Pittman; D–Wilson
- Demographics: 45% White; 38% Black; 12% Hispanic; 1% Asian; 1% Other; 3% Multiracial
- Population (2024): 84,251

North Carolina's 24th House district is one of 120 districts in the North Carolina House of Representatives. It has been represented by Democrat Dante Pittman since 2025.

== Geography ==
Since 2023, the district has included all of Wilson County, as well as part of Nash County. The district overlaps with the 4th and 11th Senate districts.

== District officeholders ==
=== Multi-member district ===
Representative	Party	Dates	Notes	Representative	Party	Dates	Notes	Representative	Party	Dates	Notes	Representative	Party	Dates	Notes	Counties
District created January 1, 1967.
Roscoe McMillan Jr. (Red Springs)	Democratic	January 1, 1967 – January 1, 1971		David Britt (Fairmont)	Democratic	January 1, 1967 – January 1, 1969	Redistricted from the Robeson County district.	Neill McFadyen (Raeford)	Democratic	January 1, 1967 – January 1, 1973	Redistricted from the Hoke County district.	Roger Kiser (Laurinburg)	Democratic	January 1, 1967 – January 1, 1969	Redistricted from the Scotland County district.	1967–1973; All of Robeson, Hoke, and Scotland counties.
Roscoe McMillan Jr. (Red Springs)	Democratic	January 1, 1967 – January 1, 1971		Gus Speros (Maxton)	Democratic	January 1, 1969 – January 1, 1973	Redistricted to the 21st district.	Neill McFadyen (Raeford)	Democratic	January 1, 1967 – January 1, 1973	Redistricted from the Hoke County district.	R. L. Campbell (Rowland)	Democratic	January 1, 1969 – January 1, 1971		1967–1973; All of Robeson, Hoke, and Scotland counties.
Joy Johnson (Fairmont)	Democratic	January 1, 1971 – January 1, 1973	Redistricted to the 21st district.	Gus Speros (Maxton)	Democratic	January 1, 1969 – January 1, 1973	Redistricted to the 21st district.	Neill McFadyen (Raeford)	Democratic	January 1, 1967 – January 1, 1973	Redistricted from the Hoke County district.	Mary Odom (Wagram)	Democratic	January 1, 1971 – January 1, 1973		1967–1973; All of Robeson, Hoke, and Scotland counties.
C. Roby Garner Sr. (Asheboro)	Republican	January 1, 1973 – January 1, 1975		W. Frank Redding III (Asheboro)	Republican	January 1, 1973 – January 1, 1975										1973–1983; All of Randolph County.
J. T. Pugh (Asheboro)	Democratic	January 1, 1975 – January 1, 1979		Gilbert Davis (Randleman)	Democratic	January 1, 1975 – January 1, 1977										1973–1983; All of Randolph County.
J. T. Pugh (Asheboro)	Democratic	January 1, 1975 – January 1, 1979		Harold Brubaker (Asheboro)	Republican	January 1, 1977 – January 1, 1983	Redistricted to the 38th district.									1973–1983; All of Randolph County.
W. Frank Redding III (Asheboro)	Republican	January 1, 1979 – January 1, 1983	Redistricted to the 30th district.	Harold Brubaker (Asheboro)	Republican	January 1, 1977 – January 1, 1983	Redistricted to the 38th district.									1973–1983; All of Randolph County.
Joe Hackney (Chapel Hill)	Democratic	January 1, 1983 – January 1, 2003	Redistricted from the 17th district. Redistricted to the 54th district.	Anne Craig Barnes (Chapel Hill)	Democratic	January 1, 1983 – January 1, 1997	Retired.									1983–1993; All of Orange County. Part of Chatham County.
Joe Hackney (Chapel Hill)	Democratic	January 1, 1983 – January 1, 2003	Redistricted from the 17th district. Redistricted to the 54th district.	Anne Craig Barnes (Chapel Hill)	Democratic	January 1, 1983 – January 1, 1997	Retired.									1993–2003; Parts of Chatham and Orange counties.
Joe Hackney (Chapel Hill)	Democratic	January 1, 1983 – January 1, 2003	Redistricted from the 17th district. Redistricted to the 54th district.	Verla Insko (Chapel Hill)	Democratic	January 1, 1997 – January 1, 2003	Redistricted to the 56th district.									1993–2003; Parts of Chatham and Orange counties.

=== Single-member district ===
Representative	Party	Dates	Notes	Counties
Jean Farmer-Butterfield (Wilson)	Democratic	January 1, 2003 – July 25, 2020	Resigned.	2003–2013; Parts of Wilson and Edgecombe counties.
Jean Farmer-Butterfield (Wilson)	Democratic	January 1, 2003 – July 25, 2020	Resigned.	2013–2019; Parts of Wilson and Pitt counties.
Jean Farmer-Butterfield (Wilson)	Democratic	January 1, 2003 – July 25, 2020	Resigned.	2019–2023; All of Wilson County.
Vacant		July 25, 2020 – July 27, 2020		2019–2023; All of Wilson County.
Linda Cooper-Suggs (Wilson)	Democratic	July 27, 2020 – January 1, 2023	Appointed to finish Farmer-Butterfield's term. Lost re-election.	2019–2023; All of Wilson County.
Ken Fontenot (Wilson)	Republican	January 1, 2023 – January 1, 2025	Lost re-election.	2023–Present; All of Wilson County. Part of Nash County.
Dante Pittman (Wilson)	Democratic	January 1, 2025 – Present		2023–Present; All of Wilson County. Part of Nash County.

== Election results ==
=== 2024 ===
North Carolina House of Representatives 24th district general election, 2024
Party	Candidate	Votes	%
Democratic	Dante Pittman	21,343	51.10%
Republican	Ken Fontenot (incumbent)	20,425	48.90%
Total votes		41,768	100%
Democratic gain from Republican			

=== 2022 ===
North Carolina House of Representatives 24th district general election, 2022
Party	Candidate	Votes	%
Republican	Ken Fontenot	15,121	54.22%
Democratic	Linda Cooper-Suggs (incumbent)	12,768	45.78%
Total votes		27,889	100%
Republican gain from Democratic			

=== 2020 ===
North Carolina House of Representatives 24th district Democratic primary election, 2020
Party	Candidate	Votes	%
Democratic	Jean Farmer-Butterfield (incumbent)	6,470	67.34%
Democratic	John G. McNeil	3,138	32.66%
Total votes		9,608	100%

North Carolina House of Representatives 24th district general election, 2020
Party	Candidate	Votes	%
Democratic	Linda Cooper-Suggs (incumbent)	20,928	52.60%
Republican	Mick Rankin	18,856	47.40%
Total votes		39,784	100%
Democratic hold			

=== 2018 ===
North Carolina House of Representatives 24th district general election, 2018
Party	Candidate	Votes	%
Democratic	Jean Farmer-Butterfield (incumbent)	14,219	50.80%
Independent	Ken Fontenot	13,770	49.20%
Total votes		27,989	100%
Democratic hold			

=== 2016 ===
North Carolina House of Representatives 24th district Democratic primary election, 2016
Party	Candidate	Votes	%
Democratic	Jean Farmer-Butterfield (incumbent)	6,570	61.52%
Democratic	Kandie Smith	4,110	38.48%
Total votes		10,680	100%

North Carolina House of Representatives 24th district general election, 2016
Party	Candidate	Votes	%
Democratic	Jean Farmer-Butterfield (incumbent)	26,895	100%
Total votes		26,895	100%
Democratic hold			

=== 2014 ===
North Carolina House of Representatives 24th district Democratic primary election, 2014
Party	Candidate	Votes	%
Democratic	Jean Farmer-Butterfield (incumbent)	4,948	77.49%
Democratic	Mark Bibbs	1,437	22.51%
Total votes		6,385	100%

North Carolina House of Repre sentativesdistrict general election, 2014
Party	Candidate	Votes	%
Democratic	Jean Farmer-Butterfield (incumbent)	15,427	100%
Total votes		15,427	100%
Democratic hold			

=== 2012 ===
North Carolina House of Representatives 24th district general election, 2012
Party	Candidate	Votes	%
Democratic	Jean Farmer-Butterfield (incumbent)	28,724	100%
Total votes		28,724	100%
Democratic hold			

=== 2010 ===
North Carolina House of Representatives 24th district general election, 2010
Party	Candidate	Votes	%
Democratic	Jean Farmer-Butterfield (incumbent)	12,682	64.84%
Republican	Claiborne R. Holtzman	6,878	35.16%
Total votes		19,560	100%
Democratic hold			

=== 2008 ===
North Carolina House of Representatives 24th district general election, 2008
Party	Candidate	Votes	%
Democratic	Jean Farmer-Butterfield (incumbent)	23,108	100%
Total votes		23,108	100%
Democratic hold			

=== 2006 ===
North Carolina House of Representatives 24th district general election, 2006
Party	Candidate	Votes	%
Democratic	Jean Farmer-Butterfield (incumbent)	7,987	100%
Total votes		7,987	100%
Democratic hold			

=== 2004 ===
North Carolina House of Representatives 24th district general election, 2004
Party	Candidate	Votes	%
Democratic	Jean Farmer-Butterfield (incumbent)	19,501	100%
Total votes		19,501	100%
Democratic hold			

=== 2002 ===
North Carolina House of Representatives 24th district Democratic primary election, 2002
Party	Candidate	Votes	%
Democratic	Jean Farmer-Butterfield	2,431	36.11%
Democratic	Shelly Willingham (incumbent)	2,102	31.22%
Democratic	A P Coleman	1,502	22.31%
Democratic	Ronald L. "Ronnie" Williams	697	10.35%
Total votes		6,732	100%

North Carolina House of Representatives 24th district general election, 2002
Party	Candidate	Votes	%
Democratic	Jean Farmer-Butterfield	11,535	100%
Total votes		11,535	100%
Democratic hold			

=== 2000 ===
North Carolina House of Representatives 24th district general election, 2000
Party	Candidate	Votes	%
Democratic	Joe Hackney (incumbent)	41,133	33.73%
Democratic	Verla Insko (incumbent)	38,944	31.93%
Republican	William Towne	19,928	16.34%
Republican	Rod Chaney	19,281	15.81%
Libertarian	John H. Bauman	2,672	2.19%
Total votes		121,958	100%
Democratic hold			
Democratic hold			
