= North Carolina's 66th House district =

American legislative district

North Carolina's 66th State House of Representatives district
Representative
Sarah Crawford; D–Raleigh
- Demographics: 48% White; 28% Black; 13% Hispanic; 5% Asian; 1% Other; 5% Multiracial
- Population (2024): 94,720

North Carolina's 66th House district is one of 120 districts in the North Carolina House of Representatives. It has been represented by Democrat Sarah Crawford since 2023.

== Geography ==
Since 2023, the district has included part of Wake County. The district overlaps with the 14th, 15th, and 18th Senate districts.

== District officeholders ==
Representative	Party	Dates	Notes	Counties
District created January 1, 1985.
Annie Brown Kennedy (Winston-Salem)	Democratic	January 1, 1985 – January 1, 1995	Redistricted from the 39th district.	1985–2003; Part of Forsyth County.
Larry Womble (Winston-Salem)	Democratic	January 1, 1995 – January 1, 2003	Redistricted to the 71st district.	1985–2003; Part of Forsyth County.
Wayne Sexton (Eden)	Republican	January 1, 2003 – January 1, 2005	Redistricted from the 73rd district. Redistricted to the 65th district and lost re-election.	2003–2005; Part of Rockingham County.
Melanie Wade Goodwin (Rockingham)	Democratic	January 1, 2005 – January 1, 2011	Retired.	2005–2013; All of Richmond County. Part of Montgomery County.
Ken Goodman (Rockingham)	Democratic	January 1, 2011 – May 1, 2019	Resigned.	2005–2013; All of Richmond County. Part of Montgomery County.
Ken Goodman (Rockingham)	Democratic	January 1, 2011 – May 1, 2019	Resigned.	2013–2019; Parts of Robeson, Hoke, Scotland, Richmond, and Montgomery counties.
Ken Goodman (Rockingham)	Democratic	January 1, 2011 – May 1, 2019	Resigned.	2019–2023; All of Richmond and Montgomery counties. Part of Stanly County.
Scott Brewer (Rockingham)	Democratic	May 1, 2019 – January 1, 2021	Appointed to finish Goodman's term. Lost re-election.	2019–2023; All of Richmond and Montgomery counties. Part of Stanly County.
Ben Moss (Rockingham)	Republican	January 1, 2021 – January 1, 2023	Redistricted to the 52nd district.	2019–2023; All of Richmond and Montgomery counties. Part of Stanly County.
Sarah Crawford (Raleigh)	Democratic	January 1, 2023 – Present		2023–Present; Part of Wake County.

== Election results ==
=== 2024 ===
North Carolina House of Representatives 66th district general election, 2024
Party	Candidate	Votes	%
Democratic	Sarah Crawford (incumbent)	33,224	74.85%
Libertarian	Michael Nelson	11,161	25.15%
Total votes		44,385	100%
Democratic hold			

=== 2022 ===
North Carolina House of Representatives 66th district Democratic primary election, 2022
Party	Candidate	Votes	%
Democratic	Sarah Crawford	3,121	47.24%
Democratic	Wesley Knott	2,982	45.13%
Democratic	Frank "Jeremiah" Pierce	504	7.63%
Total votes		6,607	100%

North Carolina House of Representatives 66th district general election, 2022
Party	Candidate	Votes	%
Democratic	Sarah Crawford	18,606	70.13%
Republican	Ives Brizuela de Sholar	7,220	27.21%
Libertarian	Micao Penaflor	705	2.66%
Total votes		26,531	100%
Democratic win (new seat)			

=== 2020 ===
North Carolina House of Representatives 66th district Republican primary election, 2020
Party	Candidate	Votes	%
Republican	Ben Moss	3,604	56.72%
Republican	Joey Davis	2,750	43.28%
Total votes		6,354	100%

North Carolina House of Representatives 66th district general election, 2020
Party	Candidate	Votes	%
Republican	Ben Moss	22,093	59.90%
Democratic	Scott Brewer (incumbent)	14,731	40.10%
Total votes		36,824	100%
Republican gain from Democratic			

=== 2018 ===
North Carolina House of Representatives 66th district general election, 2018
Party	Candidate	Votes	%
Democratic	Ken Goodman (incumbent)	13,528	51.00%
Republican	Joey Davis	12,432	46.87%
Green	Justin Miller	565	2.13%
Total votes		26,525	100%
Democratic hold			

=== 2016 ===
North Carolina House of Representatives 66th district general election, 2016
Party	Candidate	Votes	%
Democratic	Ken Goodman (incumbent)	23,396	100%
Total votes		23,396	100%
Democratic hold			

=== 2014 ===
North Carolina House of Representatives 66th district general election, 2014
Party	Candidate	Votes	%
Democratic	Ken Goodman (incumbent)	14,697	100%
Total votes		14,697	100%
Democratic hold			

=== 2012 ===
North Carolina House of Representatives 66th district general election, 2012
Party	Candidate	Votes	%
Democratic	Ken Goodman (incumbent)	21,659	100%
Total votes		21,659	100%
Democratic hold			

=== 2010 ===
North Carolina House of Representatives 66th district general election, 2010
Party	Candidate	Votes	%
Democratic	Ken Goodman	11,298	60.68%
Republican	James Haywood Parsons	7,322	39.32%
Total votes		18,620	100%
Democratic hold			

=== 2008 ===
North Carolina House of Representatives 66th district general election, 2008
Party	Candidate	Votes	%
Democratic	Melanie Wade Goodwin (incumbent)	22,173	100%
Total votes		22,173	100%
Democratic hold			

=== 2006 ===
North Carolina House of Representatives 66th district general election, 2006
Party	Candidate	Votes	%
Democratic	Melanie Wade Goodwin (incumbent)	9,578	70.55%
Republican	David Browder	3,999	29.45%
Total votes		13,577	100%
Democratic hold			

=== 2004 ===
North Carolina House of Representatives 66th district Democratic primary election, 2004
Party	Candidate	Votes	%
Democratic	Melanie Wade Goodwin	4,213	78.60%
Democratic	Anthony G. Copeland	1,147	21.40%
Total votes		5,360	100%

North Carolina House of Representatives 66th district general election, 2004
Party	Candidate	Votes	%
Democratic	Melanie Wade Goodwin	18,240	94.85%
Independent	Edward J. O’Neal (write-in)	990	5.15%
Total votes		19,230	100%
Democratic hold			

=== 2002 ===
North Carolina House of Representatives 66th district general election, 2002
Party	Candidate	Votes	%
Republican	Wayne Sexton (incumbent)	14,180	100%
Total votes		14,180	100%
Republican hold			

=== 2000 ===
North Carolina House of Representatives 66th district Democratic primary election, 2000
Party	Candidate	Votes	%
Democratic	Larry Womble (incumbent)	2,566	79.76%
Democratic	Teresa M. Mason	651	20.24%
Total votes		3,217	100%

North Carolina House of Representatives 66th district general election, 2000
Party	Candidate	Votes	%
Democratic	Larry Womble (incumbent)	12,293	85.08%
Libertarian	Donald J. Biles	2,155	14.92%
Total votes		14,448	100%
Democratic hold			
