= North Carolina's 65th House district =

American legislative district

North Carolina's 65th State House of Representatives district
Representative
Reece Pyrtle; R–Stoneville
- Demographics: 70% White; 17% Black; 7% Hispanic; 1% Other; 4% Multiracial
- Population (2024): 92,131

North Carolina's 65th House district is one of 120 districts in the North Carolina House of Representatives. It has been represented by Republican Reece Pyrtle since 2021.

== Geography ==
Since 2023, the district has included all of Rockingham County. The district overlaps with the 26th Senate district.

== District officeholders ==
Representative	Party	Dates	Notes	Counties
District created January 1, 1985.
Aaron Fussell (Raleigh)	Democratic	January 1, 1985 – January 1, 1995	Redistricted from the 21st district.	1985–2003; Part of Wake County.
Rick Eddins (Raleigh)	Republican	January 1, 1995 – January 1, 2003	Redistricted to the 40th district.	1985–2003; Part of Wake County.
Nelson Cole (Reidsville)	Democratic	January 1, 2003 – January 1, 2011	Redistricted from the 25th district. Lost re-election.	2003–2005; All of Caswell County. Part of Rockingham County.
Nelson Cole (Reidsville)	Democratic	January 1, 2003 – January 1, 2011	Redistricted from the 25th district. Lost re-election.	2005–2013; Part of Rockingham County.
Bert Jones (Reidsville)	Independent	January 1, 2011 – August 25, 2011	Switched parties. Retired.	2005–2013; Part of Rockingham County.
Bert Jones (Reidsville)	Republican	August 25, 2011 – January 1, 2019	Switched parties. Retired.	2005–2013; Part of Rockingham County.
Bert Jones (Reidsville)	Republican	August 25, 2011 – January 1, 2019	Switched parties. Retired.	2013–2019; All of Caswell County. Part of Rockingham County.
Jerry Carter (Reidsville)	Republican	January 1, 2019 – August 3, 2021	Died.	2019–2023; Part of Rockingham County.
Vacant		August 3, 2021 – August 11, 2021		2019–2023; Part of Rockingham County.
Reece Pyrtle (Stoneville)	Republican	August 11, 2021 – Present	Appointed to finish Carter's term. Lost re-nomination.	2019–2023; Part of Rockingham County.
Reece Pyrtle (Stoneville)	Republican	August 11, 2021 – Present	Appointed to finish Carter's term. Lost re-nomination.	2023–Present; All of Rockingham County.

== Election results ==
=== 2026 ===
North Carolina House of Representatives 65th district Republican primary election, 2026
Party	Candidate	Votes	%
Republican	Seth Woodall	7,670	57.52%
Republican	Reece Pyrtle (incumbent)	5,204	39.03%
Republican	Joseph Gibson III	460	3.45%
Total votes		13,334	100%

North Carolina House of Representatives 65th district general election, 2026
Party	Candidate	Votes	%
Republican	Seth Woodall		
Democratic	Gavin McGaughey		
Total votes			100%

=== 2024 ===
North Carolina House of Representatives 65th district Republican primary election, 2024
Party	Candidate	Votes	%
Republican	Reece Pyrtle (incumbent)	9,850	80.41%
Republican	Joseph Gibson III	2,399	19.59%
Total votes		12,249	100%

North Carolina House of Representatives 65th district general election, 2024
Party	Candidate	Votes	%
Republican	Reece Pyrtle (incumbent)	37,457	100%
Total votes		37,457	100%
Republican hold			

=== 2022 ===
North Carolina House of Representatives 65th district Democratic primary election, 2022
Party	Candidate	Votes	%
Democratic	Jay Donecker	2,183	69.32%
Democratic	Gary L. Smith	966	30.68%
Total votes		3,149	100%

North Carolina House of Representatives 65th district Republican primary election, 2022
Party	Candidate	Votes	%
Republican	Reece Pyrtle (incumbent)	5,813	79.86%
Republican	Joseph A. Gibson III	1,466	20.14%
Total votes		7,279	100%

North Carolina House of Representatives 65th district general election, 2022
Party	Candidate	Votes	%
Republican	Reece Pyrtle (incumbent)	21,740	67.16%
Democratic	Jay Donecker	10,632	32.84%
Total votes		32,372	100%
Republican hold			

=== 2020 ===
North Carolina House of Representatives 65th district general election, 2020
Party	Candidate	Votes	%
Republican	Jerry Carter (incumbent)	26,784	64.74%
Democratic	Amanda Joann Bell	14,590	35.26%
Total votes		41,734	100%
Republican hold			

=== 2018 ===
North Carolina House of Representatives 65th district Democratic primary election, 2018
Party	Candidate	Votes	%
Democratic	Michael H. "Mike" Lee	1,394	50.78%
Democratic	Wally White	1,351	49.22%
Total votes		2,745	100%

North Carolina House of Representatives 65th district general election, 2018
Party	Candidate	Votes	%
Republican	Jerry Carter	16,464	57.38%
Democratic	Michael H. "Mike" Lee	10,007	34.88%
Libertarian	Houston Barrow	2,220	7.74%
Total votes		28,691	100%
Republican hold			

=== 2016 ===
North Carolina House of Representatives 65th district general election, 2016
Party	Candidate	Votes	%
Republican	Bert Jones (incumbent)	21,857	60.39%
Democratic	H. Keith Duncan	14,336	39.61%
Total votes		36,193	100%
Republican hold			

=== 2014 ===
North Carolina House of Representatives 65th district general election, 2014
Party	Candidate	Votes	%
Republican	Bert Jones (incumbent)	15,808	65.26%
Democratic	Elretha Perkins	8,416	34.74%
Total votes		24,224	100%
Republican hold			

=== 2012 ===
North Carolina House of Representatives 65th district general election, 2012
Party	Candidate	Votes	%
Republican	Bert Jones (incumbent)	21,324	59.47%
Democratic	William E. Osborne	14,534	40.53%
Total votes		35,858	100%
Republican hold			

=== 2010 ===
North Carolina House of Representatives 65th district general election, 2010
Party	Candidate	Votes	%
Independent	Bert Jones	9,628	56.01%
Democratic	Nelson Cole (incumbent)	7,561	43.99%
Total votes		17,189	100%
Independent gain from Democratic			

=== 2008 ===
North Carolina House of Representatives 65th district Democratic primary election, 2008
Party	Candidate	Votes	%
Democratic	Nelson Cole (incumbent)	8,121	75.57%
Democratic	Vanessa McGee Smith-Kearney	2,626	24.43%
Total votes		10,747	100%

North Carolina House of Representatives 65th district general election, 2008
Party	Candidate	Votes	%
Democratic	Nelson Cole (incumbent)	20,495	100%
Total votes		20,495	100%
Democratic hold			

=== 2006 ===
North Carolina House of Representatives 65th district general election, 2006
Party	Candidate	Votes	%
Democratic	Nelson Cole (incumbent)	9,749	66.56%
Republican	Michael Moore	4,897	33.44%
Total votes		14,646	100%
Democratic hold			

=== 2004 ===
North Carolina House of Representatives 65th district general election, 2004
Party	Candidate	Votes	%
Democratic	Nelson Cole (incumbent)	13,890	52.65%
Republican	Wayne Sexton (incumbent)	12,493	47.35%
Total votes		26,383	100%
Democratic hold			

=== 2002 ===
North Carolina House of Representatives 65th district general election, 2002
Party	Candidate	Votes	%
Democratic	Nelson Cole (incumbent)	13,465	100%
Total votes		13,465	100%
Democratic hold			

=== 2000 ===
North Carolina House of Representatives 65th district general election, 2000
Party	Candidate	Votes	%
Republican	Rick Eddins (incumbent)	23,416	100%
Total votes		23,416	100%
Republican hold			
