= Rick L. Eddins =

American politician from North Carolina

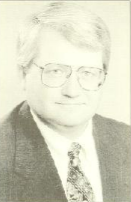
- Eddins in the 2001 legislative manual

Member of the North Carolina House of Representatives
- In office January 1, 1995 – January 1, 2007
- Preceded by: Aaron Fussell
- Succeeded by: Marilyn Avila
- Constituency: 65th District (1995-2003); 40th District (2003-2007)

Personal details
- Born: Raleigh, North Carolina, U.S.
- Party: Republican

Rick L. Eddins is a former Republican member of the North Carolina General Assembly, who represented the state's fortieth House district, including constituents in Wake County, for six terms (1995–2006). A business owner from Raleigh, North Carolina, Eddins was defeated for renomination to another term in the May 2, 2006 Republican primary by Marilyn Avila. He published a memoir, Call Me a Countrypolitan, in 2008.

== Electoral history ==
=== 2006 ===
North Carolina House of Representatives 40th district Republican primary election, 2006
Party	Candidate	Votes	%
Republican	Marilyn Avila	2,029	65.62%
Republican	Rick Eddins (incumbent)	1,063	34.38%
Total votes		3,092	100%

=== 2004 ===
North Carolina House of Representatives 40th district Republican primary election, 2004
Party	Candidate	Votes	%
Republican	Rick Eddins (incumbent)	3,069	50.40%
Republican	David S. Robinson	3,020	49.60%
Total votes		6,089	100%

North Carolina House of Representatives 40th district general election, 2004
Party	Candidate	Votes	%
Republican	Rick Eddins (incumbent)	29,528	62.14%
Democratic	Joe O’Shaughnessy	16,848	35.46%
Libertarian	Andrew Hatchell	1,143	2.41%
Total votes		47,519	100%
Republican hold			

=== 2002 ===
North Carolina House of Representatives 40th district general election, 2002
Party	Candidate	Votes	%
Republican	Rick Eddins (incumbent)	18,194	85.10%
Libertarian	Scott Quint	3,186	14.90%
Total votes		21,380	100%
Republican hold			

=== 2000 ===
North Carolina House of Representatives 65th district general election, 2000
Party	Candidate	Votes	%
Republican	Rick Eddins (incumbent)	23,416	100%
Total votes		23,416	100%
Republican hold			

North Carolina House of Representatives
Preceded by Aaron Fussell	Member of the North Carolina House of Representatives from the 65th district 1995–2003	Succeeded by Nelson Cole
Preceded by William Hiatt; Gene Wilson; Rex Baker	Member of the North Carolina House of Representatives from the 40th district 2003–2007	Succeeded by Marilyn Avila
