= North Carolina's 25th House district =

American legislative district

North Carolina's 25th State House of Representatives district
Representative
Allen Chesser; R–Middlesex
- Demographics: 45% White; 40% Black; 9% Hispanic; 1% Asian; 1% Other; 4% Multiracial
- Population (2024): 91,255

North Carolina's 25th House district is one of 120 districts in the North Carolina House of Representatives. It has been represented by Republican Allen Chesser since 2023.

== Geography ==
Since 2023, the district has included part of Nash County. The district overlaps with the 11th Senate district.

== District officeholders ==
=== Multi-member district ===
Representative	Party	Dates	Notes	Representative	Party	Dates	Notes	Counties
District created January 1, 1967.
Jule McMichael (Reidsville)	Democratic	January 1, 1967 – January 1, 1973		Earl Vaughn (Draper)	Democratic	January 1, 1967 – January 1, 1971	Redistricted from the Rockingham County district.	1967–1973; All of Rockingham County.
Jule McMichael (Reidsville)	Democratic	January 1, 1967 – January 1, 1973		Wesley Webster (Madison)	Democratic	January 1, 1971 – January 1, 1973		1967–1973; All of Rockingham County.

=== Single-member district ===
Representative	Party	Dates	Notes	Counties
T. Clyde Auman (West End)	Democratic	January 1, 1973 – January 1, 1981	Redistricted from the 28th district.	1973–1983; All of Moore County.
James Craven (Pinebluff)	Republican	January 1, 1981 – January 1, 1983	Redistricted to the 31st district and lost re-election.	1973–1983; All of Moore County.

=== Multi-member district ===
Representative	Party	Dates	Notes	Representative	Party	Dates	Notes	Representative	Party	Dates	Notes	Representative	Party	Dates	Notes	Counties
Bertha Merrill Holt (Burlington)	Democratic	January 1, 1983 – January 1, 1995	Redistricted from the 22nd district. Lost re-election.	John Jordan (Saxapahaw)	Democratic	January 1, 1983 – January 1, 1985	Redistricted from the 22nd district. Retired to run for State Senate.	Timothy McDowell (Mebane)	Democratic	January 1, 1983 – September 25, 1985	Redistricted from the 22nd district. Resigned to take seat in the State Senate.	Robert McAlister (Ruffin)	Democratic	January 1, 1983 – January 1, 1989	Redistricted from the 22nd district.	1983–1993 All of Alamance and Rockingham counties. Part of Stokes County.
Bertha Merrill Holt (Burlington)	Democratic	January 1, 1983 – January 1, 1995	Redistricted from the 22nd district. Lost re-election.	J. Fred Bowman (Burlington)	Democratic	January 1, 1985 – January 1, 1995	Lost re-election.	Timothy McDowell (Mebane)	Democratic	January 1, 1983 – September 25, 1985	Redistricted from the 22nd district. Resigned to take seat in the State Senate.	Robert McAlister (Ruffin)	Democratic	January 1, 1983 – January 1, 1989	Redistricted from the 22nd district.	1983–1993 All of Alamance and Rockingham counties. Part of Stokes County.
Bertha Merrill Holt (Burlington)	Democratic	January 1, 1983 – January 1, 1995	Redistricted from the 22nd district. Lost re-election.	J. Fred Bowman (Burlington)	Democratic	January 1, 1985 – January 1, 1995	Lost re-election.	Vacant		September 25, 1985 – November 14, 1985		Robert McAlister (Ruffin)	Democratic	January 1, 1983 – January 1, 1989	Redistricted from the 22nd district.	1983–1993 All of Alamance and Rockingham counties. Part of Stokes County.
Bertha Merrill Holt (Burlington)	Democratic	January 1, 1983 – January 1, 1995	Redistricted from the 22nd district. Lost re-election.	J. Fred Bowman (Burlington)	Democratic	January 1, 1985 – January 1, 1995	Lost re-election.	R. Samuel Hunt III (Burlington)	Democratic	November 14, 1985 – January 1, 1993	Appointed to finish McDowell's term. Retired.	Robert McAlister (Ruffin)	Democratic	January 1, 1983 – January 1, 1989	Redistricted from the 22nd district.	1983–1993 All of Alamance and Rockingham counties. Part of Stokes County.
Bertha Merrill Holt (Burlington)	Democratic	January 1, 1983 – January 1, 1995	Redistricted from the 22nd district. Lost re-election.	J. Fred Bowman (Burlington)	Democratic	January 1, 1985 – January 1, 1995	Lost re-election.	R. Samuel Hunt III (Burlington)	Democratic	November 14, 1985 – January 1, 1993	Appointed to finish McDowell's term. Retired.	Peggy Wilson (Madison)	Republican	January 1, 1989 – January 1, 1993	Redistricted to the 73rd district.	1983–1993 All of Alamance and Rockingham counties. Part of Stokes County.
Bertha Merrill Holt (Burlington)	Democratic	January 1, 1983 – January 1, 1995	Redistricted from the 22nd district. Lost re-election.	J. Fred Bowman (Burlington)	Democratic	January 1, 1985 – January 1, 1995	Lost re-election.	Nelson Cole (Reidsville)	Democratic	January 1, 1993 – January 1, 1995	Lost re-election.					1993–2003; All of Alamance and Caswell counties. Parts of Rockingham and Orange counties.
Cary Allred (Burlington)	Republican	January 1, 1995 – January 1, 2003	Redistricted to the 64th district.	Dennis Reynolds (Burlington)	Republican	January 1, 1995 – January 1, 1999	Retired.	Ken Miller (Mebane)	Republican	January 1, 1995 – January 1, 1997	Retired.					1993–2003; All of Alamance and Caswell counties. Parts of Rockingham and Orange counties.
Cary Allred (Burlington)	Republican	January 1, 1995 – January 1, 2003	Redistricted to the 64th district.	Dennis Reynolds (Burlington)	Republican	January 1, 1995 – January 1, 1999	Retired.	Nelson Cole (Reidsville)	Democratic	January 1, 1997 – January 1, 2003	Redistricted to the 65th district.					1993–2003; All of Alamance and Caswell counties. Parts of Rockingham and Orange counties.
Cary Allred (Burlington)	Republican	January 1, 1995 – January 1, 2003	Redistricted to the 64th district.	W. B. Teague (Liberty)	Republican	January 1, 1999 – January 1, 2003	Redistricted to the 64th district and retired.	Nelson Cole (Reidsville)	Democratic	January 1, 1997 – January 1, 2003	Redistricted to the 65th district.					1993–2003; All of Alamance and Caswell counties. Parts of Rockingham and Orange counties.

=== Single-member district ===
Representative	Party	Dates	Notes	Counties
Bill Daughtridge (Rocky Mount)	Republican	January 1, 2003 – January 1, 2009	Retired to run for State Treasurer.	2003–2013; Part of Nash County.
Randy Stewart (Rocky Mount)	Democratic	January 1, 2009 – January 1, 2011	Lost re-election.	2003–2013; Part of Nash County.
Jeff Collins (Rocky Mount)	Republican	January 1, 2011 – January 1, 2019	Retired.	2003–2013; Part of Nash County.
Jeff Collins (Rocky Mount)	Republican	January 1, 2011 – January 1, 2019	Retired.	2013–2019; Parts of Nash and Franklin counties.
James Gailliard (Rocky Mount)	Democratic	January 1, 2019 – January 1, 2023	Lost re-election.	2019–Present; Part of Nash County.
Allen Chesser (Middlesex)	Republican	January 1, 2023 – Present		2019–Present; Part of Nash County.

== Election results ==
=== 2026 ===
North Carolina House of Representatives 25th district Democratic primary election, 2026
Party	Candidate	Votes	%
Democratic	Lorenza Wilkins	4,964	57.07%
Democratic	Harris Walker	3,734	42.93%
Total votes		8,698	100%

North Carolina House of Representatives 25th district general election, 2026
Party	Candidate	Votes	%
Republican	Allen Chesser (incumbent)		
Democratic	Lorenza Wilkins		
Libertarian	Nick Taylor		
Total votes			100%

=== 2024 ===
North Carolina House of Representatives 25th district Republican primary election, 2024
Party	Candidate	Votes	%
Republican	Allen Chesser (incumbent)	6,415	66.61%
Republican	Yvonne McLeod	3,215	33.39%
Total votes		9,630	100%

North Carolina House of Representatives 25th district general election, 2024
Party	Candidate	Votes	%
Republican	Allen Chesser (incumbent)	23,868	48.80%
Democratic	Lorenza Wilkins	23,407	47.86%
Libertarian	Nick Taylor	1,630	3.33%
Total votes		48,905	100%
Republican hold			

=== 2022 ===
North Carolina House of Representatives 25th district Republican primary election, 2022
Party	Candidate	Votes	%
Republican	Allen Chesser	3,631	49.73%
Republican	Yvonne McLeod	3,322	45.50%
Republican	Alsey Heth Hopkins	348	4.77%
Total votes		7,301	100%

North Carolina House of Representatives 25th district general election, 2022
Party	Candidate	Votes	%
Republican	Allen Chesser	17,903	52.85%
Democratic	James Gailliard (incumbent)	15,128	44.66%
Libertarian	Nick Taylor	841	2.48%
Total votes		33,872	100%
Republican gain from Democratic			

=== 2020 ===
North Carolina House of Representatives 25th district Republican primary election, 2020
Party	Candidate	Votes	%
Republican	John M. Check	5,589	85.46%
Republican	Steve A. Matthews	951	14.54%
Total votes		6,540	100%

North Carolina House of Representatives 25th district general election, 2020
Party	Candidate	Votes	%
Democratic	James Gailliard (incumbent)	22,364	51.62%
Republican	John M. Check	19,372	44.71%
Libertarian	Nick Taylor	1,589	3.67%
Total votes		43,325	100%
Democratic hold			

=== 2018 ===
North Carolina House of Representatives 25th district general election, 2018, 2018
Party	Candidate	Votes	%
Democratic	James Gailliard	15,858	51.52%
Republican	John M. Check	13,873	45.07%
Libertarian	Nick Taylor	1,047	3.40%
Total votes		30,778	100%
Democratic gain from Republican			

=== 2016 ===
North Carolina House of Representatives 25th district general election, 2016
Party	Candidate	Votes	%
Republican	Jeff Collins (incumbent)	27,969	68.10%
Democratic	James Gailliard	13,099	31.90%
Total votes		41,068	100%
Republican hold			

=== 2014 ===
North Carolina House of Representatives 25th district general election, 2014
Party	Candidate	Votes	%
Republican	Jeff Collins (incumbent)	19,163	68.07%
Democratic	Charles M. Johnson	8,990	31.93%
Total votes		28,156	100%
Republican hold			

=== 2012 ===
North Carolina House of Representatives 25th district general election, 2012
Party	Candidate	Votes	%
Republican	Jeff Collins (incumbent)	24,434	63.30%
Democratic	Janice "Jan" Mills	14,164	36.70%
Total votes		38,598	100%
Republican hold			

=== 2010 ===
North Carolina House of Representatives 25th district general election, 2010
Party	Candidate	Votes	%
Republican	Jeff Collins	14,096	57.61%
Democratic	Randy Stewart (incumbent)	10,370	42.39%
Total votes		24,466	100%
Republican gain from Democratic			

=== 2008 ===
North Carolina House of Representatives 25th district Democratic primary election, 2008
Party	Candidate	Votes	%
Democratic	Randy Stewart	7,868	60.81%
Democratic	Carnell Taylor	5,070	39.19%
Total votes		12,938	100%

North Carolina House of Representatives 25th district Republican primary election, 2008
Party	Candidate	Votes	%
Republican	W. B. Bullock	2,288	58.41%
Republican	Robert A. Coats	1,629	41.59%
Total votes		3,917	100%

North Carolina House of Representatives 25th district general election, 2008
Party	Candidate	Votes	%
Democratic	Randy Stewart	19,581	54.93%
Republican	W. B. Bullock	16,067	45.07%
Total votes		35,648	100%
Democratic gain from Republican			

=== 2006 ===
North Carolina House of Representatives 25th district Democratic primary election, 2006
Party	Candidate	Votes	%
Democratic	Carnell Taylor	1,598	58.30%
Democratic	Dennis Nielsen	1,143	41.70%
Total votes		2,741	100%

North Carolina House of Representatives 25th district general election, 2006
Party	Candidate	Votes	%
Republican	Bill Daughtridge (incumbent)	8,444	61.58%
Democratic	Carnell Taylor	5,268	38.42%
Total votes		13,712	100%
Republican hold			

=== 2004 ===
North Carolina House of Representatives 25th district general election, 2004
Party	Candidate	Votes	%
Republican	Bill Daughtridge (incumbent)	20,092	100%
Total votes		20,092	100%
Republican hold			

=== 2002 ===
North Carolina House of Representatives 25th district Republican primary election, 2002
Party	Candidate	Votes	%
Republican	Bill Daughtridge	2,573	66.88%
Republican	Joe Price	1,274	33.12%
Total votes		3,847	100%

North Carolina House of Representatives 25th district general election, 2002
Party	Candidate	Votes	%
Republican	Bill Daughtridge	11,725	59.28%
Democratic	Mary Alice Wells	8,053	40.72%
Total votes		19,778	100%
Republican hold			

=== 2000 ===
North Carolina House of Representatives 25th district general election, 2000
Party	Candidate	Votes	%
Republican	Cary Allred (incumbent)	36,513	18.71%
Republican	W. B. Teague (incumbent)	35,197	18.04%
Democratic	Nelson Cole (incumbent)	34,228	17.54%
Republican	Bert Jones	33,950	17.40%
Democratic	John M. Glenn	32,271	16.54%
Democratic	Danny E. Davis	23,001	11.79%
Total votes		195,160	100%
Republican hold			
Republican hold			
Democratic hold			
