= James Gailliard =

American politician

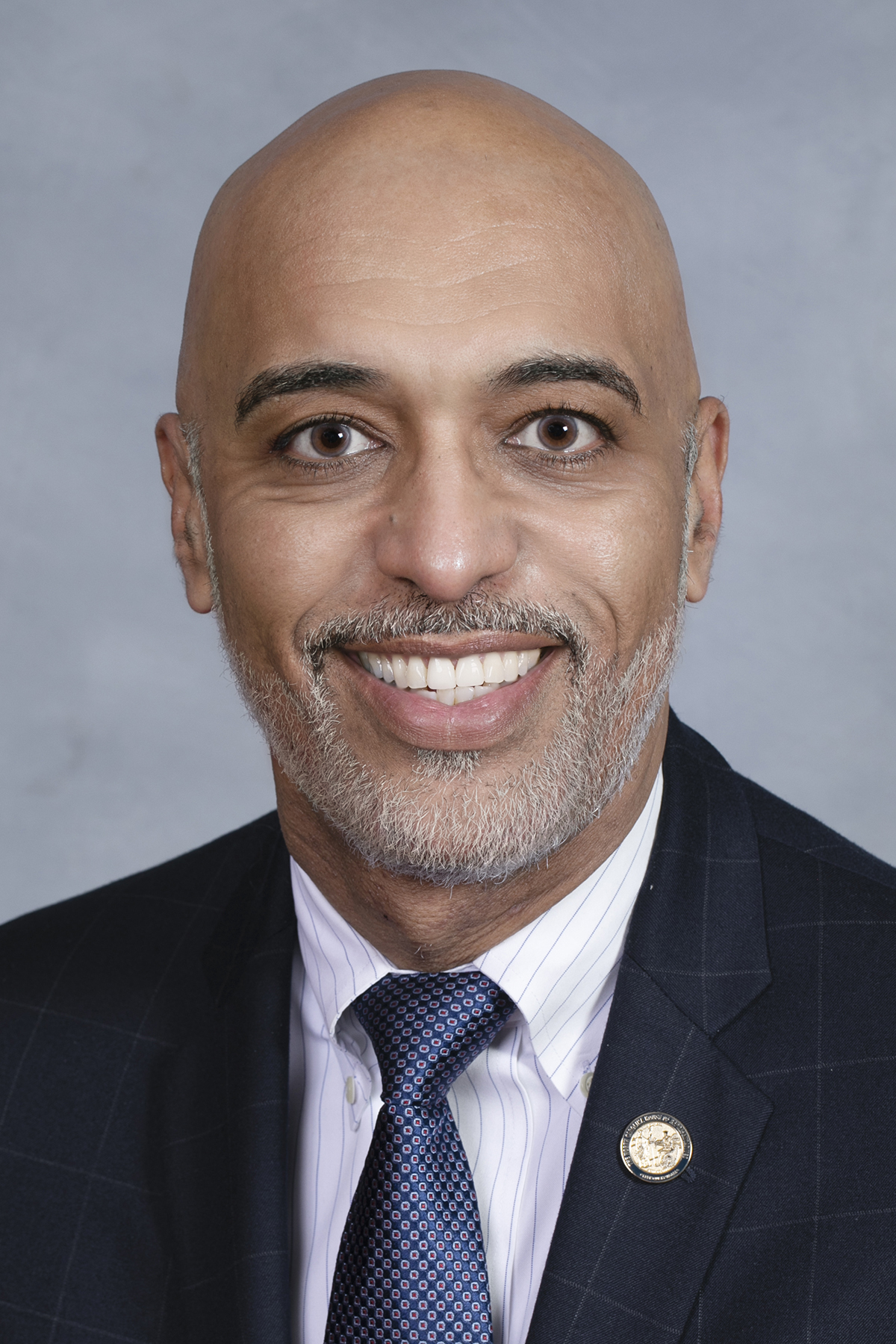

Member-elect of the North Carolina Senate from the 11th district
- Assuming office January 1, 2027
- Succeeding: Lisa Stone Barnes

Member of the North Carolina House of Representatives from the 25th district
- In office January 1, 2019 – January 1, 2023
- Preceded by: Jeff Collins
- Succeeded by: Allen Chesser

Personal details
- Born: James David Gailliard; January 9, 1965 (age 61) Philadelphia, Pennsylvania, U.S.
- Party: Democratic
- Education: Morehouse College (BS)
- Occupation: Pastor; CEO

James David Gailliard (born January 9, 1965) is an American pastor and politician. He is senior pastor and CEO of Word Tabernacle Church in Rocky Mount, North Carolina, and a Democratic former member of the North Carolina House of Representatives. Gailliard represented the 25th district (including most of Nash County) from 2019 to 2023. He attended Morehouse College and St. Joseph's University.

Gailliard won the November 2018 general election for House District 25 (Nash County/Rocky Mount); the first African-American to hold this seat. He secured fifty-one percent of the vote while his closest rival, Republican John Check, secured forty-five percent.

Gailliard was defeated for reelection in the November 2022 general election for House District 25 (Nash County/Rocky Mount) by Republican Allen Chesser. Chesser secured fifty-two percent of the vote to Gailliard's forty-four percent.

== Electoral history ==
=== 2022 ===
North Carolina House of Representatives 25th district general election, 2022
| Party | Candidate | Votes | % |
|---|---|---|---|
| Republican | Allen Chesser | 17,903 | 52.85% |
| Democratic | James Gailliard (incumbent) | 15,128 | 44.66% |
| Libertarian | Nick Taylor | 841 | 2.48% |
| Total votes | | 33,872 | 100% |
| Republican gain from Democratic | | | |

=== 2020 ===
North Carolina House of Representatives 25th district general election, 2020
| Party | Candidate | Votes | % |
|---|---|---|---|
| Democratic | James Gailliard (incumbent) | 22,364 | 51.62% |
| Republican | John M. Check | 19,372 | 44.71% |
| Libertarian | Nick Taylor | 1,589 | 3.67% |
| Total votes | | 43,325 | 100% |
| Democratic hold | | | |

=== 2018 ===
North Carolina House of Representatives 25th district general election, 2018
| Party | Candidate | Votes | % |
|---|---|---|---|
| Democratic | James Gailliard | 15,858 | 51.52% |
| Republican | John M. Check | 13,873 | 45.07% |
| Libertarian | Nick Taylor | 1,047 | 3.40% |
| Total votes | | 30,778 | 100% |
| Democratic gain from Republican | | | |

=== 2016 ===
North Carolina House of Representatives 25th district general election, 2016
| Party | Candidate | Votes | % |
|---|---|---|---|
| Republican | Jeff Collins (incumbent) | 27,969 | 68.10% |
| Democratic | James Gailliard | 13,099 | 31.90% |
| Total votes | | 41,068 | 100% |
| Republican hold | | | |

== Committee assignments ==
=== 2021–2022 session ===
- Appropriations
- Appropriations - Capital
- Education - Community Colleges
- Education - K-12
- Health

=== 2019–2020 session ===
- Appropriations
- Appropriations - Education
- Education - K-12
- Health

North Carolina House of Representatives
| Preceded by Jeff Collins | Member of the North Carolina House of Representatives from the 25th district 2019–2023 | Succeeded by Allen Chesser |
