= Jerry Carter (North Carolina politician) =

American politician from North Carolina (1955–2021)

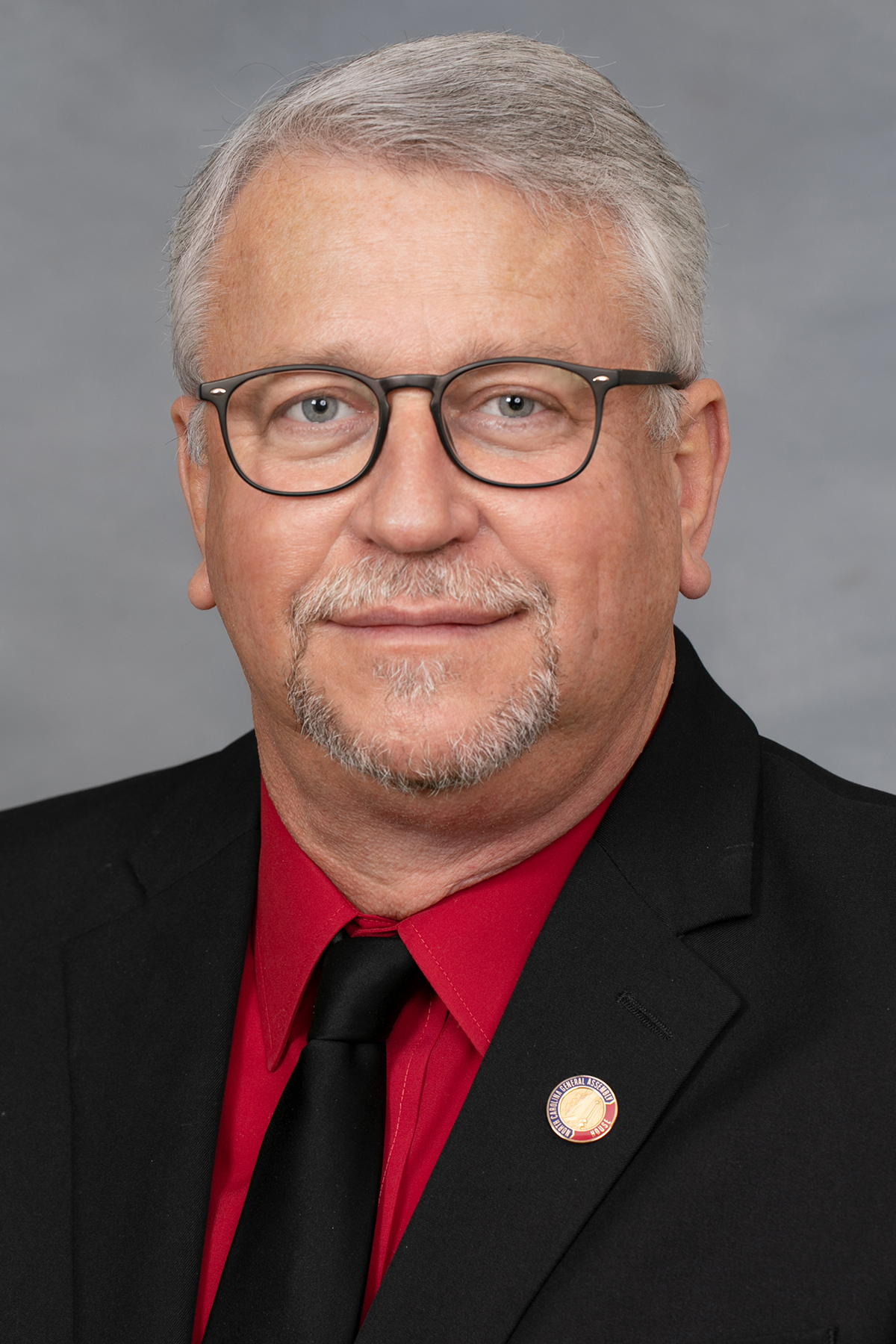

Member of the North Carolina House of Representatives from the 65th district
- In office January 1, 2019 – August 3, 2021
- Preceded by: Bert Jones
- Succeeded by: Reece Pyrtle

Personal details
- Born: May 27, 1955 Eden, North Carolina, U.S.
- Died: August 3, 2021 (aged 66) Durham, North Carolina, U.S.
- Party: Republican
- Education: Liberty University
- Occupation: Pastor

Jerry Lee Carter (May 27, 1955 – August 3, 2021) was an American politician who served as a Republican member of the North Carolina House of Representatives, having been initially elected in 2018. He represented District 65, covering most of Rockingham County. He was the founder and pastor of Reidsville Baptist Church in Reidsville, North Carolina.

Carter died from complications of surgery at a hospital in Durham, North Carolina, on August 3, 2021, at age 66.

== Electoral history ==
=== 2020 ===
North Carolina House of Representatives 65th district general election, 2020
| Party | Candidate | Votes | % |
|---|---|---|---|
| Republican | Jerry Carter (incumbent) | 26,784 | 64.74% |
| Democratic | Amanda Joann Bell | 14,590 | 35.26% |
| Total votes | | 41,734 | 100% |
| Republican hold | | | |

=== 2018 ===
North Carolina House of Representatives 65th district general election, 2018
| Party | Candidate | Votes | % |
|---|---|---|---|
| Republican | Jerry Carter | 16,464 | 57.38% |
| Democratic | Michael H. "Mike" Lee | 10,007 | 34.88% |
| Libertarian | Houston Barrow | 2,220 | 7.74% |
| Total votes | | 28,691 | 100% |
| Republican hold | | | |

North Carolina House of Representatives
| Preceded by Bert Jones | Member of the North Carolina House of Representatives from the 65th district 2019–2021 | Succeeded by Reece Pyrtle |
