= Melanie Wade Goodwin =

American politician from North Carolina (1970–2020)

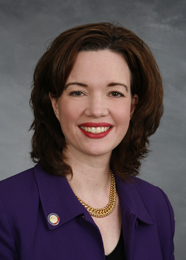

Member of the North Carolina House of Representatives from the 66th district
- In office January 1, 2005 – January 1, 2011
- Preceded by: Wayne Goodwin (Redistricting)
- Succeeded by: Ken Goodman

Personal details
- Born: July 22, 1970 Richmond, Virginia, U.S.
- Died: September 1, 2020 (aged 50) Raleigh, North Carolina, U.S.
- Party: Democratic
- Spouse: Wayne Goodwin
- Children: 2
- Education: University of North Carolina at Chapel Hill (BA); Campbell University (JD)

Melanie Wade Goodwin (July 22, 1970 – September 1, 2020) was an American politician who served in the North Carolina House of Representatives from the 66th district as a member of the Democratic Party. She was the first member of the North Carolina General Assembly to give birth while in office.

== Early life ==
Melanie Wade Goodwin was born to Albert and Nancy Wade on July 22, 1970, in Richmond, Virginia. In 1988, she graduated from Jesse O. Sanderson High School. In 1992, Goodwin graduated from the University of North Carolina at Chapel Hill with a Bachelor of Arts in English. She later graduated from Campbell University with a Juris Doctor. In 2000, she was admitted to the North Carolina State Bar.

On May 16, 1998, she married Wayne Goodwin, a member of the North Carolina House of Representatives, with whom she had two children.

== North Carolina House of Representatives ==
In 2004, Wayne Goodwin announced that he would seek election as North Carolina's Labor Commissioner rather than seek a fifth term in the North Carolina House of Representatives. Melanie Goodwin ran as the Democratic nominee and won in the general election. She was reelected in 2006, and 2008. In 2009, she announced that she would not seek a fourth term in the North Carolina House of Representatives.

In 2008, she gave birth to her second child, which was the first time a sitting member of the North Carolina General Assembly had given birth.

== Later life ==
Goodwin was appointed to serve as Deputy Commissioner of North Carolina's Industrial Commission on July 8, 2011. On March 1, 2019, she was named as Chief Deputy Commissioner by Chairman Philip Baddour III.

In 2009, Goodwin was diagnosed with breast cancer, and died in Raleigh, North Carolina, on September 1, 2020.

== Electoral history ==
North Carolina House of Representatives 66th district election, 2004
Primary election
Party	Candidate	Votes	%
Democratic	Melanie Wade Goodwin	4,213	78.60%
Democratic	Anthony G. Copeland	1,147	21.40%
Total votes		5,360	100%
General election
Democratic	Melanie Wade Goodwin	18,240	94.85%
Independent	Edward J. O’Neal (write-in)	990	5.15%
Total votes		19,230	100%
Democratic hold			

North Carolina House of Representatives 66th district general election, 2006
Party	Candidate	Votes	%
Democratic	Melanie Wade Goodwin (incumbent)	9,578	70.55%
Republican	David Browder	3,999	29.45%
Total votes		13,577	100%
Democratic hold			

North Carolina House of Representatives 66th district general election, 2008
Party	Candidate	Votes	%
Democratic	Melanie Wade Goodwin (incumbent)	22,173	100%
Total votes		22,173	100%
Democratic hold			

North Carolina House of Representatives
Preceded by Wayne Sexton	Member of the North Carolina House of Representatives from the 66th district 2005–2011	Succeeded by Ken Goodman
