= Dan Ingle =

American politician

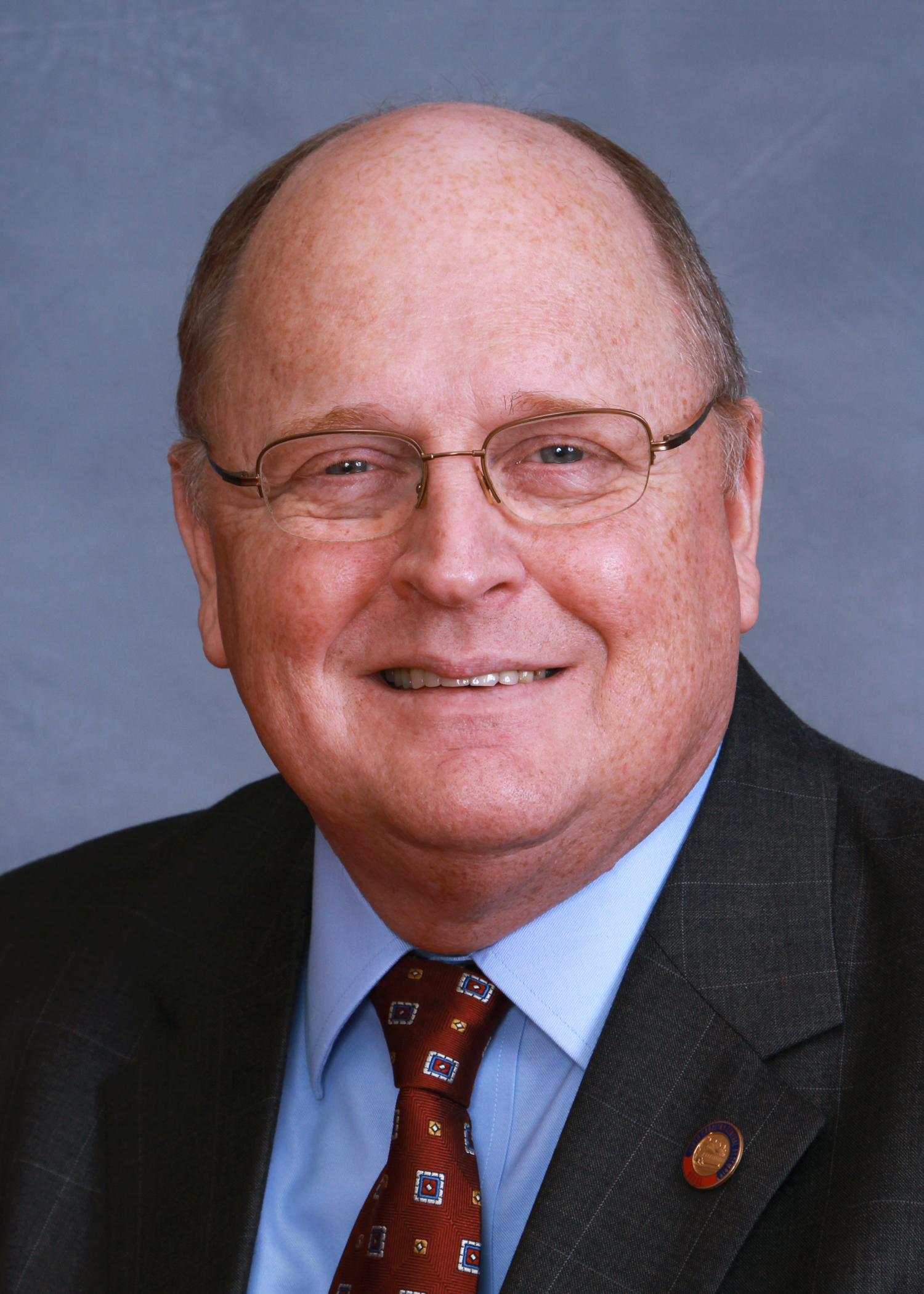

Member of the Alamance-Burlington Board of Education
- Incumbent
- Assumed office December 2022

Member of the Alamance County Board of Commissioners
- In office December 1, 2014 – April 1, 2016
- Preceded by: Bill Lashley; Tim Sutton
- Succeeded by: Roger Parker
- In office December 6, 2004 – June 12, 2009
- Preceded by: John Patterson
- Succeeded by: Bill Lashley

Member of the North Carolina House of Representatives from the 64th district
- In office June 12, 2009 – January 1, 2013
- Preceded by: Cary Allred
- Succeeded by: Dennis Riddell

Personal details
- Born: Dan Winslow Ingle; May 27, 1952 (age 74) Greensboro, North Carolina, U.S.
- Party: Republican
- Spouse: Debbie Ingle
- Children: 4
- Education: Elon University

Dan Winslow Ingle (born May 27, 1952) is an American politician who served in the North Carolina House of Representatives from June 12, 2009 to January 1, 2013, representing North Carolina's 64th House district.

== Early life ==
Dan Winslow Ingle was born on May 27, 1952 in Greensboro, North Carolina. Ingle graduated from Gibsonville High School in 1970 before serving in the Burlington police department from May 1, 1973 until March 1, 1984. He served 17 years in the Elon Police Department, including as its chief, retiring in 2002 after a combined 40 years in law enforcement.

In 1998, Ingle earned a Bachelor of Arts degree in political science from Elon University as a non-traditional student.

In 2004, Ingle was elected to the Alamance County Board of Commissioners, eventually serving as its Vice Chair.

== North Carolina House of Representatives ==
In 2009, Ingle was appointed by the Alamance County Republican Party to the North Carolina House of Representatives, after his predecessor, Cary Allred, resigned due to a scandal. He served one term, and did not run for reelection in 2012.

While in office, Ingle opposed the controversial Racial Justice Act, symbolically throwing away a law book during debate on the bill.

== Later political career ==
After leaving the North Carolina House, Ingle returned to the Alamance County Board of Commissioners in 2014. On April 1, 2016, he resigned from the Board of Commissioners, citing health reasons.

In 2022, Ingle was elected to the Alamance-Burlington School Board, campaigning on his experience in public service and a focus on depoliticizing the school system.

== Personal life ==
Ingle has twice been awarded the Order of the Long Leaf Pine, North Carolina's highest civilian honor.

Ingle is Baptist and attends church in Whitsett. He and his wife, Debbie Ingle, have four daughters.

== Electoral history ==
=== 2022 ===
In the 2022 Alamance-Burlington Board of Education election, voters each selected three candidates. Ingle, Charles Parker, and Chuck Marsh won seats on the Board of Education.

2022 Alamance-Burlington Board of Education election
Party	Candidate	Votes	%
Nonpartisan	Dan Ingle	33,897	24.99%
Nonpartisan	Charles Parker	27,263	20.10%
Nonpartisan	Chuck Marsh	25,839	19.05%
Nonpartisan	Seneca Rogers	23,295	17.17%
Nonpartisan	Avery Wagoner	16,738	12.34%
Nonpartisan	Leonard Harrison	7,856	5.79%
Write-in		780	0.57%
Total votes		135,668	100%

=== 2014 ===
Alamance County Board of Commissioners Republican primary election, 2014
Party	Candidate	Votes	%
Republican	Dan Ingle	4,538	35.58%
Republican	Bill Lashley (incumbent)	2,817	22.09%
Republican	Tim Sutton (incumbent)	2,420	18.97%
Republican	Barry Joyce	1,119	8.77%
Republican	Jerry Wagner	1,116	8.75%
Republican	Eddie Shoe	744	5.83%
Total votes		12,754	100%

Alamance County Board of Commissioners general election, 2014
Party	Candidate	Votes	%
Republican	Dan Ingle	26,375	38.92%
Democratic	Bob Byrd	21,383	31.55%
Republican	Bill Lashley (incumbent)	20,008	29.53%
Total votes		67,766	100%
Republican hold			
Democratic gain from Republican			

=== 2010 ===
After being appointed to finish Cary Allred's last term, Ingle ran unopposed in the 2010 North Carolina House of Representatives election.

North Carolina House of Representatives 64th district general election, 2010
Party	Candidate	Votes	%
Republican	Dan Ingle (incumbent)	19,301	100%
Total votes		19,301	100%
Republican hold			

=== 2008 ===
Alamance County Board of Commissioners Republican primary election, 2008
Party	Candidate	Votes	%
Republican	Dan Ingle (incumbent)	4,624	22.85%
Republican	Bill Lashley (incumbent)	3,955	19.55%
Republican	Tom Manning	3,197	15.80%
Republican	Lee Isley	2,329	11.51%
Republican	Larry Lee	2,129	10.52%
Republican	Hayes Teague	2,088	10.32%
Republican	Pat Pickell	977	4.83%
Republican	Rebecca Stumpfig	936	4.63%
Total votes		20,235	100%

Alamance County Board of Commissioners general election, 2008
Party	Candidate	Votes	%
Republican	Dan Ingle (incumbent)	32,085	17.98%
Democratic	Linda Massey	30,842	17.29%
Democratic	Eddie Boswell	30,446	17.07%
Republican	Tom Manning	30,157	16.90%
Republican	Bill Lashley (incumbent)	29,537	16.56%
Democratic	Joyce Glenda Bowman	25,332	14.20%
Total votes		178,399	100%
Republican hold			
Democratic gain from Republican			
Democratic gain from Republican			

North Carolina House of Representatives
Preceded by Cary Allred	Member of the North Carolina House of Representatives from the 64th district 2009–2013	Succeeded by Dennis Riddell
