= Allen Chesser =

American politician

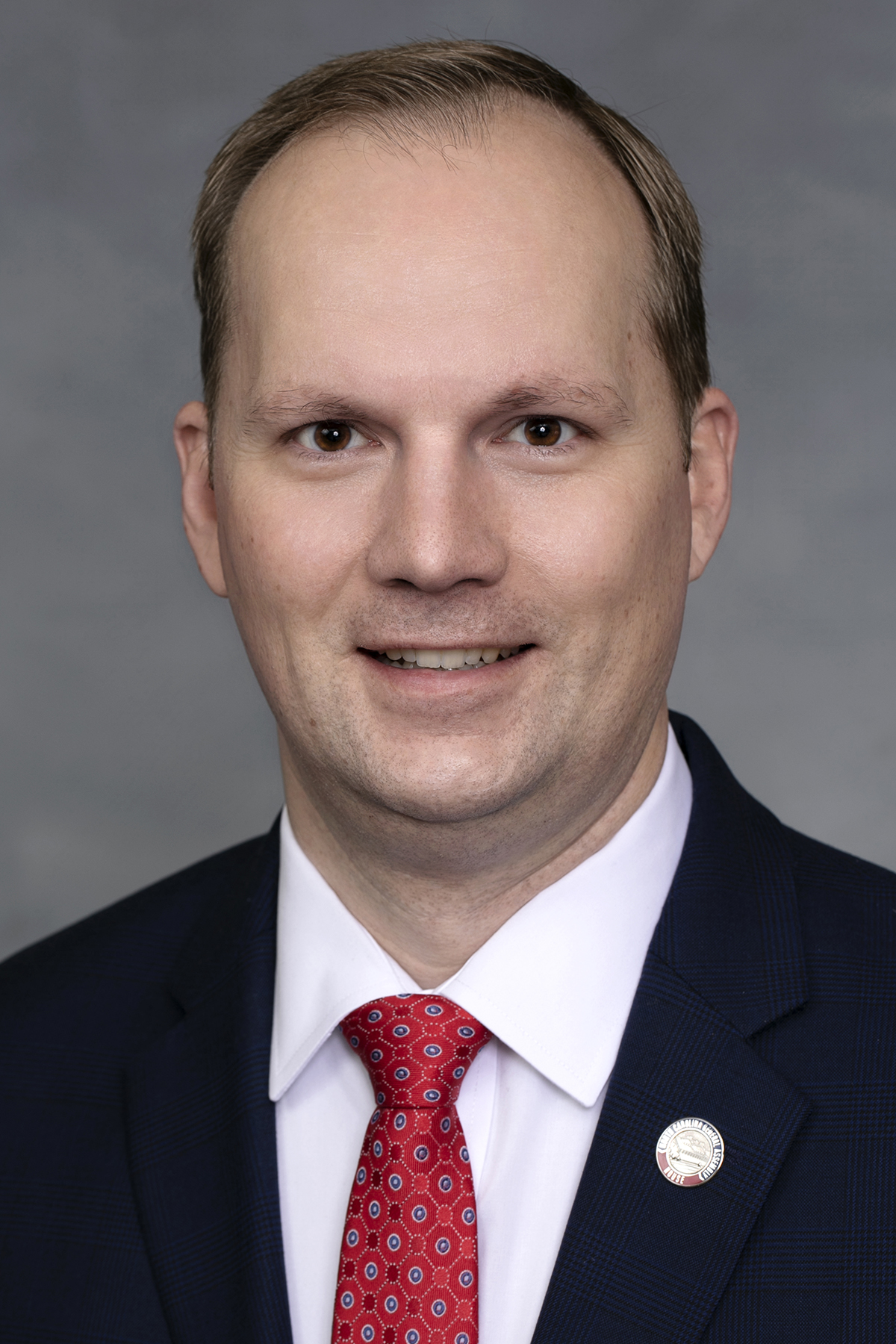

Member of the North Carolina House of Representatives from the 25th district
- Incumbent
- Assumed office January 1, 2023
- Preceded by: James Gailliard

Personal details
- Born: Gregory Allen Chesser II
- Party: Republican
- Spouse: Jessica
- Children: 5
- Education: Bunn High School
- Occupation: Law Enforcement Officer
- Website: Official website

Gregory Allen Chesser II is a Republican member of the North Carolina House of Representatives, who has represented the 25th district (including part of Nash County) since 2023. A law enforcement officer who served in the Army National Guard from 2003 to 2009, Chesser unsuccessfully ran for Congress in 2018.

As a representative, Chesser was one of the primary sponsors of the Fostering Care in NC Act, a bill to enact more state oversight of the county-administered foster care system in North Carolina. He is in favor of increased regulations on cannabis and THC products.

== Electoral history ==
=== 2022 ===
North Carolina House of Representatives 25th district Republican primary election, 2022
Party	Candidate	Votes	%
Republican	Allen Chesser	3,631	49.73%
Republican	Yvonne McLeod	3,322	45.50%
Republican	Alsey Heth Hopkins	348	4.77%
Total votes		7,301	100%

North Carolina House of Representatives 25th district general election, 2022
Party	Candidate	Votes	%
Republican	Allen Chesser	17,903	52.85%
Democratic	James Gailliard (incumbent)	15,128	44.66%
Libertarian	Nick Taylor	841	2.48%
Total votes		33,872	100%
Republican gain from Democratic			

=== 2018 ===
North Carolina's 2nd congressional district Republican primary election, 2018
Party	Candidate	Votes	%
Republican	George Holding (incumbent)	17,979	76.21%
Republican	Allen Chesser	5,612	23.79%
Total votes		23,591	100%

== Committee assignments ==
=== 2023-2024 session ===
- Appropriations
- Appropriations - Capital
- Health
- Insurance
- Military and Veterans Affairs
- Oversight and Reform

North Carolina House of Representatives
Preceded by James Gailliard	Member of the North Carolina House of Representatives from the 25th district 2023–Present	Incumbent
