= North Carolina's 40th House district =

American legislative district

North Carolina's 40th State House of Representatives district
Representative
Phil Rubin; D–Raleigh
- Demographics: 71% White; 11% Black; 7% Hispanic; 6% Asian; 4% Multiracial
- Population (2024): 87,815

North Carolina's 40th House district is one of 120 districts in the North Carolina House of Representatives. It had been represented by Democrat Phil Rubin since 2025. Rubin was appointed to complete the term of Joe John, who resigned and then died in 2025.

== Geography ==
Since 2003, the district has included part of northwestern Wake County. The district overlaps with the 15th, 16th, and 18th Senate districts.

== District officeholders ==
=== Multi-member district ===
Representative	Party	Dates	Notes	Representative	Party	Dates	Notes	Representative	Party	Dates	Notes	Counties
District created January 1, 1967.
Loyd Mullinax (Newton)	Democratic	January 1, 1967 – January 1, 1969		Julius Reid Poovey (Hickory)	Republican	January 1, 1967 – January 1, 1969						1967–1973; All of Catawba County.
Robert Quincy Beard (Newton)	Republican	January 1, 1969 – January 1, 1973	Redistricted to the 37th district.	G. Hunter Warlick (Hickory)	Republican	January 1, 1969 – January 1, 1973	Redistricted to the 37th district.					1967–1973; All of Catawba County.
Robert Falls (Shelby)	Democratic	January 1, 1973 – January 1, 1981	Redistricted from the 43rd district.	Jack Hunt (Lattimore)	Democratic	January 1, 1973 – January 1, 1977		Bob Jones (Forest City)	Democratic	January 1, 1973 – January 1, 1979	Redistricted from the 43rd district.	1973–1983; All of Cleveland, Rutherford, and Polk counties.
Robert Falls (Shelby)	Democratic	January 1, 1973 – January 1, 1981	Redistricted from the 43rd district.	Edith Ledford Lutz (Lawndale)	Democratic	January 1, 1977 – January 1, 1983	Redistricted to the 48th district.	Bob Jones (Forest City)	Democratic	January 1, 1973 – January 1, 1979	Redistricted from the 43rd district.	1973–1983; All of Cleveland, Rutherford, and Polk counties.
Robert Falls (Shelby)	Democratic	January 1, 1973 – January 1, 1981	Redistricted from the 43rd district.	Edith Ledford Lutz (Lawndale)	Democratic	January 1, 1977 – January 1, 1983	Redistricted to the 48th district.	Jack Hunt (Lattimore)	Democratic	January 1, 1979 – January 1, 1983	Redistricted to the 48th district.	1973–1983; All of Cleveland, Rutherford, and Polk counties.
Bob Jones (Forest City)	Democratic	January 1, 1981 – January 1, 1983		Edith Ledford Lutz (Lawndale)	Democratic	January 1, 1977 – January 1, 1983	Redistricted to the 48th district.	Jack Hunt (Lattimore)	Democratic	January 1, 1979 – January 1, 1983	Redistricted to the 48th district.	1973–1983; All of Cleveland, Rutherford, and Polk counties.
Margaret Hayden (Sparta)	Democratic	January 1, 1983 – January 1, 1985	Redistricted from the 28th district.	David Diamont (Pilot Mountain)	Democratic	January 1, 1983 – January 1, 1995	Redistricted from the 28th district.	J. Worth Gentry (King)	Democratic	January 1, 1983 – January 1, 1985		1983–1993; All of Ashe, Alleghany, and Surry Counties. Parts of Watauga and Stokes counties.
James Cole (Boone)	Republican	January 1, 1985 – January 1, 1987		David Diamont (Pilot Mountain)	Democratic	January 1, 1983 – January 1, 1995	Redistricted from the 28th district.	J. Marshall Hall (King)	Republican	January 1, 1985 – January 1, 1987		1983–1993; All of Ashe, Alleghany, and Surry Counties. Parts of Watauga and Stokes counties.
Wade Wilmoth (Boone)	Democratic	January 1, 1987 – January 1, 1989		David Diamont (Pilot Mountain)	Democratic	January 1, 1983 – January 1, 1995	Redistricted from the 28th district.	Judy Hunt (Blowing Rock)	Democratic	January 1, 1987 – July 1, 1993	Resigned.	1983–1993; All of Ashe, Alleghany, and Surry Counties. Parts of Watauga and Stokes counties.
William Wilson (Boone)	Republican	January 1, 1989 – January 1, 1991		David Diamont (Pilot Mountain)	Democratic	January 1, 1983 – January 1, 1995	Redistricted from the 28th district.	Judy Hunt (Blowing Rock)	Democratic	January 1, 1987 – July 1, 1993	Resigned.	1983–1993; All of Ashe, Alleghany, and Surry Counties. Parts of Watauga and Stokes counties.
Wade Wilmoth (Boone)	Democratic	January 1, 1991 – January 1, 1995		David Diamont (Pilot Mountain)	Democratic	January 1, 1983 – January 1, 1995	Redistricted from the 28th district.	Judy Hunt (Blowing Rock)	Democratic	January 1, 1987 – July 1, 1993	Resigned.	1983–1993; All of Ashe, Alleghany, and Surry Counties. Parts of Watauga and Stokes counties.
Wade Wilmoth (Boone)	Democratic	January 1, 1991 – January 1, 1995		David Diamont (Pilot Mountain)	Democratic	January 1, 1983 – January 1, 1995	Redistricted from the 28th district.	Judy Hunt (Blowing Rock)	Democratic	January 1, 1987 – July 1, 1993	Resigned.	1993–2003; All of Watauga, Ashe, Alleghany, Surry, and Stokes counties.
Wade Wilmoth (Boone)	Democratic	January 1, 1991 – January 1, 1995		David Diamont (Pilot Mountain)	Democratic	January 1, 1983 – January 1, 1995	Redistricted from the 28th district.	Vacant		July 1, 1993 – October 21, 1993		1993–2003; All of Watauga, Ashe, Alleghany, Surry, and Stokes counties.
Wade Wilmoth (Boone)	Democratic	January 1, 1991 – January 1, 1995		David Diamont (Pilot Mountain)	Democratic	January 1, 1983 – January 1, 1995	Redistricted from the 28th district.	Anderson Cromer (King)	Democratic	October 21, 1993 – January 1, 1995	Appointed to finish Hunt's term.	1993–2003; All of Watauga, Ashe, Alleghany, Surry, and Stokes counties.
Gene Wilson (Boone)	Republican	January 1, 1995 – January 1, 2003	Redistricted to the 82nd district.	William Hiatt (Mount Airy)	Republican	January 1, 1995 – January 1, 2003	Redistricted to the 91st district and retired.	Rex Baker (King)	Republican	January 1, 1995 – January 1, 2003	Redistricted to the 91st district.	1993–2003; All of Watauga, Ashe, Alleghany, Surry, and Stokes counties.

=== Single-member district ===
Representative	Party	Dates	Notes	Counties
Rick Eddins (Raleigh)	Republican	January 1, 2003 – January 1, 2007	Redistricted from the 65th district. Lost re-nomination.	2003–Present; Part of Wake County.
Marilyn Avila (Raleigh)	Republican	January 1, 2007 – January 1, 2017	Lost re-election.	2003–Present; Part of Wake County.
Joe John (Raleigh)	Democratic	January 1, 2017 – January 21, 2025	Resigned.	2003–Present; Part of Wake County.
Vacant		January 21, 2025 – January 29, 2025		2003–Present; Part of Wake County.
Phil Rubin (Raleigh)	Democratic	January 29, 2025 – Present	Appointed to finish John's term.	2003–Present; Part of Wake County.

== Election results ==
=== 2024 ===
North Carolina House of Representatives 40th district general election, 2024
Party	Candidate	Votes	%
Democratic	Joe John (incumbent)	32,983	62.32%
Republican	Jerry Doliner	18,332	34.64%
Libertarian	Michael Munger	1,612	3.05%
Total votes		52,927	100%
Democratic hold			

=== 2022 ===
North Carolina House of Representatives 40th district Democratic primary election, 2022
Party	Candidate	Votes	%
Democratic	Joe John (incumbent)	5,520	74.10%
Democratic	Marguerite Creel	1,929	25.90%
Total votes		7,449	100%

North Carolina House of Representatives 40th district general election, 2022
Party	Candidate	Votes	%
Democratic	Joe John (incumbent)	24,630	54.78%
Republican	Marilyn Avila	19,224	42.75%
Libertarian	Michael Nelson	1,111	2.47%
Total votes		44,965	100%
Democratic hold			

=== 2020 ===
North Carolina House of Representatives 40th district general election, 2020
Party	Candidate	Votes	%
Democratic	Joe John (incumbent)	31,837	56.47%
Republican	Gerard Falzon	24,545	43.53%
Total votes		56,382	100%
Democratic hold			

=== 2018 ===
North Carolina House of Representatives 40th district general election, 2018
Party	Candidate	Votes	%
Democratic	Joe John (incumbent)	24,193	51.24%
Republican	Marilyn Avila	21,256	45.02%
Libertarian	David Ulmer	1,767	3.74%
Total votes		47,216	100%
Democratic hold			

=== 2016 ===
North Carolina House of Representatives 40th district general election, 2016
Party	Candidate	Votes	%
Democratic	Joe John	23,786	50.41%
Republican	Marilyn Avila (incumbent)	23,402	49.59%
Total votes		47,188	100%
Democratic gain from Republican			

=== 2014 ===
North Carolina House of Representatives 40th district general election, 2014
Party	Candidate	Votes	%
Republican	Marilyn Avila (incumbent)	16,120	54.30%
Democratic	Margaret E. Broadwell	13,567	45.70%
Total votes		29,687	100%
Republican hold			

=== 2012 ===
North Carolina House of Representatives 40th district general election, 2012
Party	Candidate	Votes	%
Republican	Marilyn Avila (incumbent)	22,613	53.86%
Democratic	William "Watt" Jones	17,541	41.78%
Libertarian	Ron Reale	1,828	4.35%
Total votes		41,982	100%
Republican hold			

=== 2010 ===
North Carolina House of Representatives 40th district general election, 2010
Party	Candidate	Votes	%
Republican	Marilyn Avila (incumbent)	27,686	62.88%
Democratic	Violet Rhinehart	16,345	37.12%
Total votes		44,031	100%
Republican hold			

=== 2008 ===
North Carolina House of Representatives 40th district Democratic primary election, 2008
Party	Candidate	Votes	%
Democratic	Stan Morse	7,353	54.82%
Democratic	Sam Hart Brewer	6,061	45.18%
Total votes		13,414	100%

North Carolina House of Representatives 40th district general election, 2008
Party	Candidate	Votes	%
Republican	Marilyn Avila (incumbent)	35,764	56.68%
Democratic	Stan Morse	27,336	43.32%
Total votes		63,100	100%
Republican hold			

=== 2006 ===
North Carolina House of Representatives 40th district Republican primary election, 2006
Party	Candidate	Votes	%
Republican	Marilyn Avila	2,029	65.62%
Republican	Rick Eddins (incumbent)	1,063	34.38%
Total votes		3,092	100%

North Carolina House of Representatives 40th district general election, 2006
Party	Candidate	Votes	%
Republican	Marilyn Avila	20,556	100%
Total votes		20,556	100%
Republican hold			

=== 2004 ===
North Carolina House of Representatives 40th district Republican primary election, 2004
Party	Candidate	Votes	%
Republican	Rick Eddins (incumbent)	3,069	50.40%
Republican	David S. Robinson	3,020	49.60%
Total votes		6,089	100%

North Carolina House of Representatives 40th district general election, 2004
Party	Candidate	Votes	%
Republican	Rick Eddins (incumbent)	29,528	62.14%
Democratic	Joe O’Shaughnessy	16,848	35.46%
Libertarian	Andrew Hatchell	1,143	2.41%
Total votes		47,519	100%
Republican hold			

=== 2002 ===
North Carolina House of Representatives 40th district general election, 2002
Party	Candidate	Votes	%
Republican	Rick Eddins (incumbent)	18,194	85.10%
Libertarian	Scott Quint	3,186	14.90%
Total votes		21,380	100%
Republican hold			

=== 2000 ===
North Carolina House of Representatives 40th district Republican primary election, 2000
Party	Candidate	Votes	%
Republican	William Hiatt (incumbent)	5,951	30.41%
Republican	Gene Wilson (incumbent)	5,317	27.17%
Republican	Rex Baker (incumbent)	4,798	24.52%
Republican	John Brady	1,928	9.85%
Republican	Larry Joseph Wood II	1,575	8.05%
Total votes		19,569	100%

North Carolina House of Representatives 40th district general election, 2000
Party	Candidate	Votes	%
Republican	William Hiatt (incumbent)	44,155	23.90%
Republican	Gene Wilson (incumbent)	42,337	22.92%
Republican	Rex Baker (incumbent)	42,110	22.79%
Democratic	Bert Wood	30,224	16.36%
Democratic	Daniel Hense	25,915	14.03%
Total votes		184,741	100%
Republican hold			
Republican hold			
Republican hold			
