= Cary D. Allred =

American politician (1947–2011)

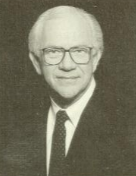
- Allred in the 1999 legislative manual

Member of the North Carolina House of Representatives
- In office January 1, 1995 – June 1, 2009
- Preceded by: James Fred Bowman; Bertha Merrill Holt; Nelson Cole
- Succeeded by: Dan Ingle
- Constituency: 25th District (1995–2003); 64th District (2003–2009)

Member of the Alamance County Board of Commissioners
- In office 1984–1994

Member of the North Carolina Senate
- In office January 1, 1981 – January 1, 1985
- Preceded by: Ralph Scott
- Succeeded by: John M. Jordan
- Constituency: 18th District (1981–1983); 21st District (1983–1985)

Personal details
- Born: February 7, 1947 Mebane, North Carolina, U.S.
- Died: December 10, 2011 (aged 64) Greensboro, North Carolina, U.S.
- Party: Republican
- Occupation: Small business owner, politician

Cary Dale Allred (February 7, 1947 – December 10, 2011) was a member of the North Carolina General Assembly representing the state's sixty-fourth House district, including constituents in Alamance County. A business owner from Burlington, North Carolina, Allred was elected to eight terms in the state House. He previously served two terms in the state Senate. Allred served in the United States Navy, and has also served as an Alamance County commissioner. He spent the majority of his career as a Republican, but following a series of public controversies, he left the Republican Party in 2010 and registered as an independent.

Allred died December 10, 2011, in Greensboro, North Carolina at the age of 64.

== Early life ==
Cary Allred was born February 7, 1947, in Mebane, North Carolina, and graduated from Southern Alamance High School in 1965. He then went on to serve in the U.S. Navy and graduate from Elon University in 1970.

== Recent electoral history ==
=== 2010 ===
In March 2010, Allred changed his voter registration to unaffiliated and stated his intention to run for County Commissioner in Alamance County either as an independent or a write-in candidate. He was able to get enough signatures to qualify as a write-in, but eventually lost the race to Republican Tom Manning.

Alamance County Commissioner
Party	Candidate	Votes	%
Republican	Tom Manning	25,011,067	99.94%
Democratic	Jeremy Teetor	14,002	0.05%
Write-in		1,373	0.01%
Total votes		25,026,442	100%

=== 2008 ===
North Carolina House of Representatives 64th district general election, 2008
Party	Candidate	Votes	%
Republican	Cary Allred (incumbent)	22,122	61.38%
Democratic	Henry Vines	13,919	38.62%
Total votes		36,041	100%
Republican hold			

=== 2006 ===
North Carolina House of Representatives 64th district general election, 2006
Party	Candidate	Votes	%
Republican	Cary Allred (incumbent)	12,320	100%
Total votes		12,320	100%
Republican hold			

=== 2004 ===
North Carolina House of Representatives 64th district Republican primary election, 2004
Party	Candidate	Votes	%
Republican	Cary Allred (incumbent)	2,766	82.62%
Republican	A. J. Glass	582	17.38%
Total votes		3,348	100%

North Carolina House of Representatives 64th district general election, 2004
Party	Candidate	Votes	%
Republican	Cary Allred (incumbent)	22,787	100%
Total votes		22,787	100%
Republican hold			

=== 2002 ===
North Carolina House of Representatives 64th district Republican primary election, 2002
Party	Candidate	Votes	%
Republican	Cary Allred (incumbent)	2,936	71.59%
Republican	Keith Whited	1,165	28.41%
Total votes		4,101	100%

North Carolina House of Representatives 64th district general election, 2002
Party	Candidate	Votes	%
Republican	Cary Allred (incumbent)	13,901	100%
Total votes		13,901	100%
Republican hold			

=== 2000 ===
North Carolina House of Representatives 25th district general election, 2000
Party	Candidate	Votes	%
Republican	Cary Allred (incumbent)	36,513	18.71%
Republican	W. B. Teague (incumbent)	35,197	18.04%
Democratic	Nelson Cole (incumbent)	34,228	17.54%
Republican	Bert Jones	33,950	17.40%
Democratic	John M. Glenn	32,271	16.54%
Democratic	Danny E. Davis	23,001	11.79%
Total votes		195,160	100%
Republican hold			
Republican hold			
Democratic hold			

== Controversies ==
In 1981, while a state senator, Allred wrote letters on his company letterhead asking for opinions on health issues and to keep his company in mind for their needs. An investigation by the state Senate found this to be an ethics violation.

In August 2008, Allred caused a minor local controversy by handing out his legislative cards and state maps at a local Southern Alamance High School football game during his run for the North Carolina Legislature. He was asked to leave the premises.

In November 2008, after winning re-election, Allred left a series of answering machine messages bragging about his victory while sounding intoxicated. Allred claimed that he was "intoxicated with victory".

On the evening of April 27, 2009, Allred was pulled over by a North Carolina State Highway Patrolman, who observed the representative traveling 102 MPH in a 65 MPH zone. Allred stated that he had consumed one chelada. Later that evening, he arrived at the state legislature and embraced a 17-year-old page. Both Allred and the page have stated that they share a "Grandfather-granddaughter" relationship; however, on April 30, 2009, an investigation was launched by the Sergeant-at-Arms of the legislature.

On May 20, 2009, a report indicated that several persons had seen Allred behave "inappropriately" with the page. Mr. Allred threatened to leave the Republican Party. He then resigned the position on June 1, 2009.

On June 29, 2010, Allred was pulled over by Burlington police officers who observed him swerving into the lane opposite his and refused to take a sobriety test. At this point he was taken to the police station where he was given an alcohol-breath test but was unable to produce a sufficient amount of breath to produce a reading (he claimed that due to his bronchitis he was unable to produce enough breath) which resulted in it being recorded as a fail.

North Carolina Senate
Preceded by Ralph Scott	Member of the North Carolina Senate from the 18th district 1981–1983	Succeeded by R. C. Soles Jr.
Preceded by Gilbert Lee Boger; Paul Sanders Smith	Member of the North Carolina Senate from the 21st district 1983–1985	Succeeded by John M. Jordan
North Carolina House of Representatives
Preceded by James Fred Bowman; Bertha Merrill Holt; Nelson Cole	Member of the North Carolina House of Representatives from the 25th district 1995–2003; Served alongside: Ken J. Miller, Dennis Alan Reynolds, Nelson Cole, Worthy B. Teague Jr.	Succeeded by Bill Daughtridge
Preceded by Bob Hensley	Member of the North Carolina House of Representatives from the 64th district 2003–2009	Succeeded by Dan Ingle
