= Annie Brown Kennedy =

American politician and attorney (1924–2023)

Member of the North Carolina House of Representatives from the 66th district
- In office January 1, 1983 – January 1, 1995
- Succeeded by: Larry W. Womble

Member of the North Carolina House of Representatives from the 29th district
- In office November 1979 – January 1, 1981

Personal details
- Born: October 13, 1924 Atlanta, Georgia, US
- Died: January 17, 2023 (aged 98) Winston-Salem, North Carolina, US
- Party: Democratic
- Education: Howard University School of Law, Spelman College
- Occupation: Politician, attorney

Annie Brown Kennedy (October 13, 1924 – January 17, 2023) was an American politician and attorney who was the first black woman to serve in the North Carolina General Assembly. Appointed to the North Carolina House of Representatives in 1979, she was elected in 1982 and served through 1994.

== Early life and legal career ==
Kennedy was born in Atlanta, Georgia, on October 13, 1924, the oldest of four children of Reverend Mancy Brown and Mary Louise Sheats Brown. She received her bachelor's degree in economics from Spelman College in 1945 and her Juris Doctor degree from Howard University School of Law in 1951.

After living briefly in New York, Kennedy accompanied her husband to his hometown of Winston-Salem, North Carolina, in 1953. She passed the bar that same year and became the second black woman in state history, and the second woman in Forsyth County, to practice law. She was a sole practitioner licensed to practice in Georgia and North Carolina and before federal courts, including the US Supreme Court. Kennedy served as the first black woman president of the Forsyth County Bar Association.

In 1955, her husband, Harold Kennedy Jr., joined her law practice. Eventually, they became partners in the Winston-Salem law firm of Kennedy, Kennedy, Kennedy and Kennedy, LLP, where they practiced law with two of their three sons, Harold Kennedy III and Harvey Kennedy. The firm specialized in family law and civil litigation, especially civil rights and racial and sexual discrimination cases.

== Political career ==
Kennedy became active in the local Democratic Party during the 1960s and 1970s, campaigning for desegregation and African American civil rights. She was a founding member and president of the multiracial Democratic Women of Forsyth County. In 1976, she became the first black woman to serve as a North Carolina presidential elector. Her husband served in the North Carolina House of Representatives during the 1977 session.

In November 1979, Governor Jim Hunt, a Democrat, appointed her to the North Carolina House of Representatives to fill the unexpired term of District 29 representative Judson D. DeRamus Jr., who had resigned to become a state Superior Court judge. In 1980, Kennedy ran unsuccessfully to keep her seat in the House. Running again in 1982, she won her race to represent North Carolina's 66th House district, comprising most of Forsyth County. Kennedy chaired the House Judiciary, Economic Expansion/Labor Relations and Employment, Governmental Ethics, and Manufacturers and Labor committees. Championing the welfare of families, women, and African Americans, she campaigned for passage of paid family leave and foiled legislators' attempt to close the nursing program at Winston-Salem State University. After serving six consecutive terms of office, she retired in January 1995.

== Legacy ==
Kennedy served on the boards of directors of the University of North Carolina at Chapel Hill, the North Carolina Institute of Minority Economic Development, the Winston-Salem Symphony, the Southern National Bank, the Winston-Salem State University Foundation, the First Baptist Church of Winston-Salem, and many other organizations. She received the Margaret Brent Women Lawyers of Achievement Award from the American Bar Association in 2002. The North Carolina General Assembly passed a joint resolution honoring her life and memory in June 2023.

Kennedy died in Winston-Salem on January 17, 2023, at the age of 98. Her husband predeceased her.
