= Dennis Riddell =

American politician

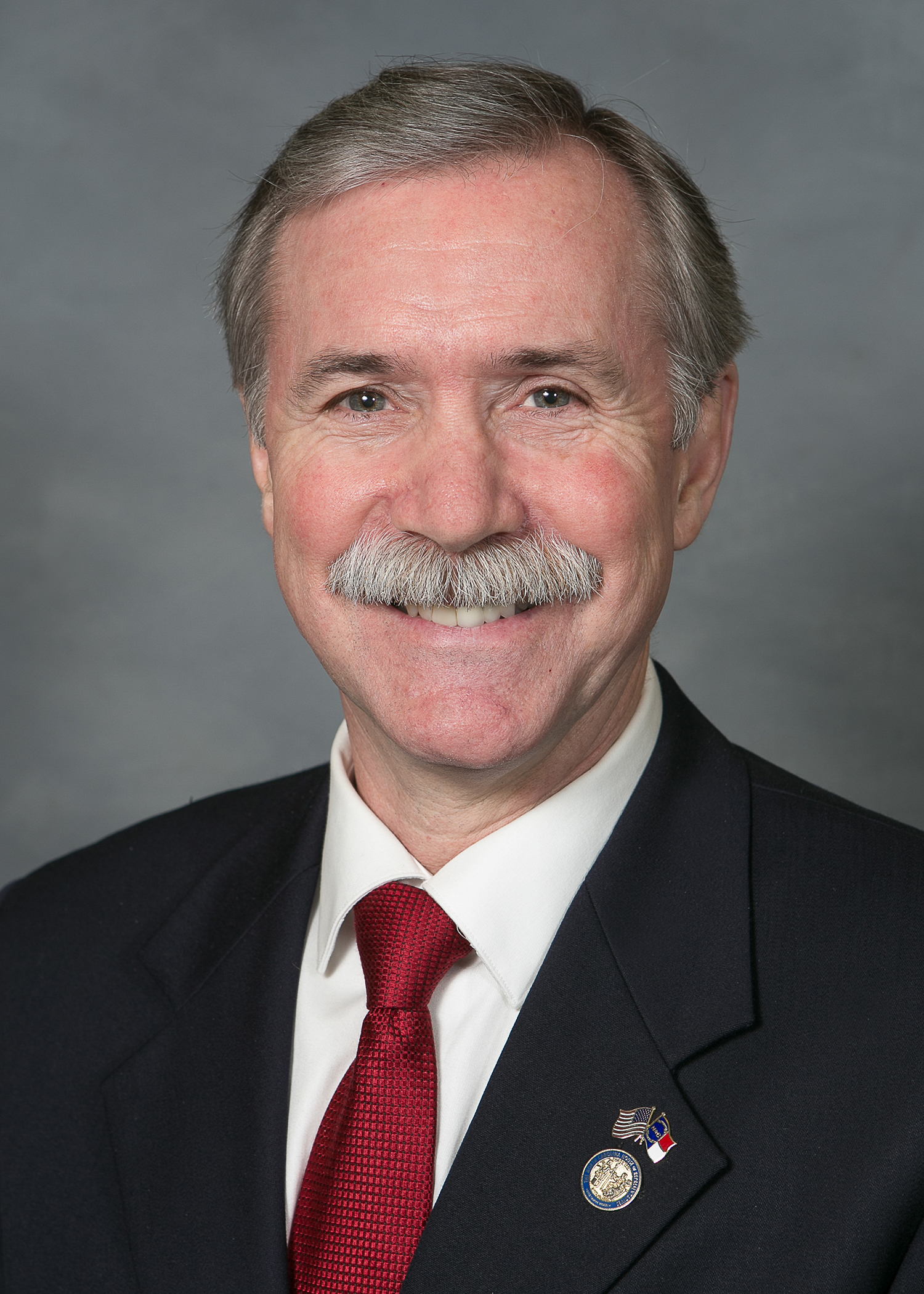

Member of the North Carolina House of Representatives from the 64th district
- Incumbent
- Assumed office January 1, 2013
- Preceded by: Dan Ingle

Personal details
- Born: Dennis Patrick Riddell; October 21, 1956 (age 69)
- Party: Republican
- Spouse: Polly
- Children: 8
- Education: California State University Maritime Academy (BS); Bob Jones University (MEd)

Dennis Patrick Riddell (born October 21, 1956) is a Republican member of the North Carolina House of Representatives. He has represented the 64th district (including constituents in southern Alamance County) since 2013.

== Committee assignments ==
=== 2021-2022 Session ===
- Appropriations (Vice Chair)
- Appropriations - General Government (Chair)
- Regulatory Reform (Chair)
- Education - K-12
- Election Law and Campaign Finance Reform
- Energy and Public Utilities
- Federal Relations and American Indian Affairs

=== 2019-2020 Session ===
- Appropriations (Vice Chair)
- Appropriations - General Government (Chair)
- Regulatory Reform (Chair)
- Education - K-12
- Election Law and Campaign Finance Reform
- Energy and Public Utilities

=== 2017-2018 Session ===
- Appropriations (Vice Chair)
- Appropriations - General Government (Chair)
- Regulatory Reform (Chair)
- Education - K-12
- Elections and Ethics Law
- Energy and Public Utilities
- Agriculture
- Ethics
- Judiciary IV

=== 2015-2016 Session ===
- Appropriations (Vice Chair)
- Appropriations - General Government (Chair)
- Regulatory Reform (Chair)
- Education - K-12
- Elections
- Public Utilities
- Agriculture
- Judiciary IV
- Children, Youth and Families

=== 2013-2014 Session ===
- Appropriations
- Education (Vice Chair)
- Elections
- Public Utilities
- Agriculture
- Commerce and Job Development

== Electoral history ==
=== 2020 ===
North Carolina House of Representatives 64th district Republican primary election, 2020
Party	Candidate	Votes	%
Republican	Dennis Riddell (incumbent)	6,247	83.27%
Republican	Peter McClelland	1,255	16.73%
Total votes		7,502	100%

North Carolina House of Representatives 64th district general election, 2020
Party	Candidate	Votes	%
Republican	Dennis Riddell (incumbent)	26,103	59.48%
Democratic	Eric Henry	17,786	40.52%
Total votes		43,889	100%
Republican hold			

=== 2018 ===
North Carolina House of Representatives 64th district general election, 2018
Party	Candidate	Votes	%
Republican	Dennis Riddell (incumbent)	14,942	57.83%
Democratic	Elliott Lynch	10,896	42.17%
Total votes		25,838	100%
Republican hold			

=== 2016 ===
North Carolina House of Representatives 64th district general election, 2016
Party	Candidate	Votes	%
Republican	Dennis Riddell (incumbent)	23,857	100%
Total votes		23,857	100%
Republican hold			

=== 2014 ===
North Carolina House of Representatives 64th district general election, 2014
Party	Candidate	Votes	%
Republican	Dennis Riddell (incumbent)	13,346	100%
Total votes		13,346	100%
Republican hold			

=== 2012 ===
North Carolina House of Representatives 64th district general election, 2012
Party	Candidate	Votes	%
Republican	Dennis Riddell	18,296	58.99%
Democratic	Morris McAdoo	12,721	41.01%
Total votes		31,017	100%
Republican hold			

North Carolina House of Representatives
Preceded by Dan Ingle	Member of the North Carolina House of Representatives from the 64th district 2013-Present	Incumbent
