= E. Nelson Cole =

American politician

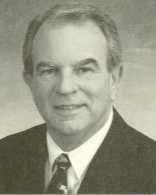
- Cole in the 2003 legislative manual

Member of the North Carolina House of Representatives
- In office January 1, 1997 – January 1, 2011
- Preceded by: Ken Miller
- Succeeded by: Bert Jones
- Constituency: 25th District (1997-2003); 65th District (2003-2011)
- In office January 1, 1993 – January 1, 1995
- Preceded by: Rector Samuel Hunt III; Peggy Wilson
- Succeeded by: Cary Allred; Ken Miller; Dennis Alan Reynolds
- Constituency: 25th District

Personal details
- Born: March 29, 1937 (age 89) Charlotte, North Carolina, U.S.
- Party: Democratic
- Education: University of South Carolina (BS)

Edward Nelson Cole (born Charlotte, North Carolina, March 29, 1937) is a former Democratic member of the North Carolina General Assembly. A resident of Reidsville, North Carolina, he represented the state's sixty-fifth House district, which includes constituents in Rockingham County, for eight terms.

A graduate of the University of South Carolina (1962), Cole worked as a manager for Ford Motor Company until becoming an auto dealer in 1980. Cole has been active on transportation-related issues, sponsoring a bicycle safety law and being a member of several national transportation groups - the State Automotive Enthusiast Leadership Council and the National Conference of State Legislatures standing committee on transportation. As of the 2009-2010 session, he was the co-chairman of the legislature's Joint Legislative Transportation Oversight Committee.

Cole was defeated for re-election to his House seat by conservative independent candidate Bert Jones on November 2, 2010. In the 2012 election, Cole is running to attempt a comeback and return to his former seat.

== Electoral history ==
=== 2012 ===
North Carolina House of Representatives 91st district general election, 2012
Party	Candidate	Votes	%
Republican	Bryan Holloway (incumbent)	22,417	61.00%
Democratic	Nelson Cole	14,334	39.00%
Total votes		36,751	100%
Republican hold			

=== 2010 ===
North Carolina House of Representatives 65th district general election, 2010
Party	Candidate	Votes	%
Independent	Bert Jones	9,628	56.01%
Democratic	Nelson Cole (incumbent)	7,561	43.99%
Total votes		17,189	100%
Independent gain from Democratic			

=== 2008 ===
North Carolina House of Representatives 65th district Democratic primary election, 2008
Party	Candidate	Votes	%
Democratic	Nelson Cole (incumbent)	8,121	75.57%
Democratic	Vanessa McGee Smith-Kearney	2,626	24.43%
Total votes		10,747	100%

North Carolina House of Representatives 65th district general election, 2008
Party	Candidate	Votes	%
Democratic	Nelson Cole (incumbent)	20,495	100%
Total votes		20,495	100%
Democratic hold			

=== 2006 ===
North Carolina House of Representatives 65th district general election, 2006
Party	Candidate	Votes	%
Democratic	Nelson Cole (incumbent)	9,749	66.56%
Republican	Michael Moore	4,897	33.44%
Total votes		14,646	100%
Democratic hold			

=== 2004 ===
North Carolina House of Representatives 65th district general election, 2004
Party	Candidate	Votes	%
Democratic	Nelson Cole (incumbent)	13,890	52.65%
Republican	Wayne Sexton (incumbent)	12,493	47.35%
Total votes		26,383	100%
Democratic hold			

=== 2002 ===
North Carolina House of Representatives 65th district general election, 2002
Party	Candidate	Votes	%
Democratic	Nelson Cole (incumbent)	13,465	100%
Total votes		13,465	100%
Democratic hold			

North Carolina House of Representatives
Preceded by Rector Samuel Hunt III; Peggy Wilson	Member of the North Carolina House of Representatives from the 25th district 1993–1995; Served alongside: James Fred Bowman, Bertha Merrill Holt	Succeeded by Cary Allred; Ken Miller; Dennis Alan Reynolds
Preceded by Ken Miller	Member of the North Carolina House of Representatives from the 25th district 1997–2003; Served alongside: Cary Allred, Dennis Alan Reynolds, Worthy B. Teague Jr.	Succeeded by Bill Daughtridge
Preceded by Rick Eddins	Member of the North Carolina House of Representatives from the 65th district 2003–2011	Succeeded by Bert Jones
