= Larry W. Womble =

American politician from North Carolina (1941–2020)

Member of the North Carolina House of Representatives
- In office January 1, 1995 – January 1, 2013
- Preceded by: Annie Brown Kennedy
- Succeeded by: Evelyn Terry
- Constituency: 66th District (1995-2003); 71st District (2003-2013)

Personal details
- Born: Larry Wayne Womble; June 6, 1941 Winston-Salem, North Carolina
- Died: May 14, 2020 (aged 78) Winston-Salem, North Carolina
- Party: Democratic
- Education: Winston-Salem State University, University of North Carolina - Greensboro, Appalachian State University
- Profession: educator

Larry Wayne Womble (June 6, 1941 – May 14, 2020) was a Democratic member of the North Carolina General Assembly representing the state's seventy-first House district, including constituents in Forsyth County. A retired educator from Winston-Salem, North Carolina, Womble served nine terms in the state House. After sustaining injuries in a car crash, he announced in 2012 that he would not run for another term.

Womble was born in Winston-Salem, North Carolina to the late Owen Luchion and Dorothy Gwyn Womble and attended Forsyth County public schools. He earned a B.S. degree in education at Winston-Salem State University in 1963, and then attended the University of North Carolina - Greensboro where he earned a Master of Education degree in Administration (and a Principal's Certificate) in 1977. He later earned an Ed.S. in Administration and an Advanced Principal's Certificate from Appalachian State University in 1979.

Womble launched his political career at the age of 40, with his election to the Winston-Salem Board of Aldermen. He served on the Board until 1993, and was elected to the North Carolina General Assembly in 1995.

He died at his home in Winston-Salem on May 14, 2020, aged 78, after a period of declining health.

== Electoral history ==
=== 2010 ===
North Carolina House of Representatives 71st district general election, 2010
Party	Candidate	Votes	%
Democratic	Larry Womble (incumbent)	9,503	100%
Total votes		9,503	100%
Democratic hold			

=== 2008 ===
North Carolina House of Representatives 71st district general election, 2008
Party	Candidate	Votes	%
Democratic	Larry Womble (incumbent)	21,583	90.02%
Libertarian	Bobby Richmond	2,393	9.98%
Total votes		23,976	100%
Democratic hold			

=== 2006 ===
North Carolina House of Representatives 71st district general election, 2006
Party	Candidate	Votes	%
Democratic	Larry Womble (incumbent)	7,101	100%
Total votes		7,101	100%
Democratic hold			

=== 2004 ===
North Carolina House of Representatives 71st district general election, 2004
Party	Candidate	Votes	%
Democratic	Larry Womble (incumbent)	15,840	86.93%
Libertarian	Lynn Haggerty	2,381	13.07%
Total votes		18,221	100%
Democratic hold			

=== 2002 ===
North Carolina House of Representatives 71st district general election, 2002
Party	Candidate	Votes	%
Democratic	Larry Womble (incumbent)	9,662	66.11%
Republican	Mac Weatherman	4,571	31.28%
Libertarian	Lynn Haggerty	382	2.61%
Total votes		14,615	100%
Democratic hold			

=== 2000 ===
North Carolina House of Representatives 66th district Democratic primary election, 2000
Party	Candidate	Votes	%
Democratic	Larry Womble (incumbent)	2,566	79.76%
Democratic	Teresa M. Mason	651	20.24%
Total votes		3,217	100%

North Carolina House of Representatives 66th district general election, 2000
Party	Candidate	Votes	%
Democratic	Larry Womble (incumbent)	12,293	85.08%
Libertarian	Donald J. Biles	2,155	14.92%
Total votes		14,448	100%
Democratic hold			

North Carolina House of Representatives
Preceded by Annie Brown Kennedy	Member of the North Carolina House of Representatives from the 66th district 1995–2003	Succeeded by Wayne Sexton
Preceded by Joe Tolson	Member of the North Carolina House of Representatives from the 71st district 2003–2013	Succeeded by Evelyn Terry
