= Joe John =

American judge and politician (1939–2025)

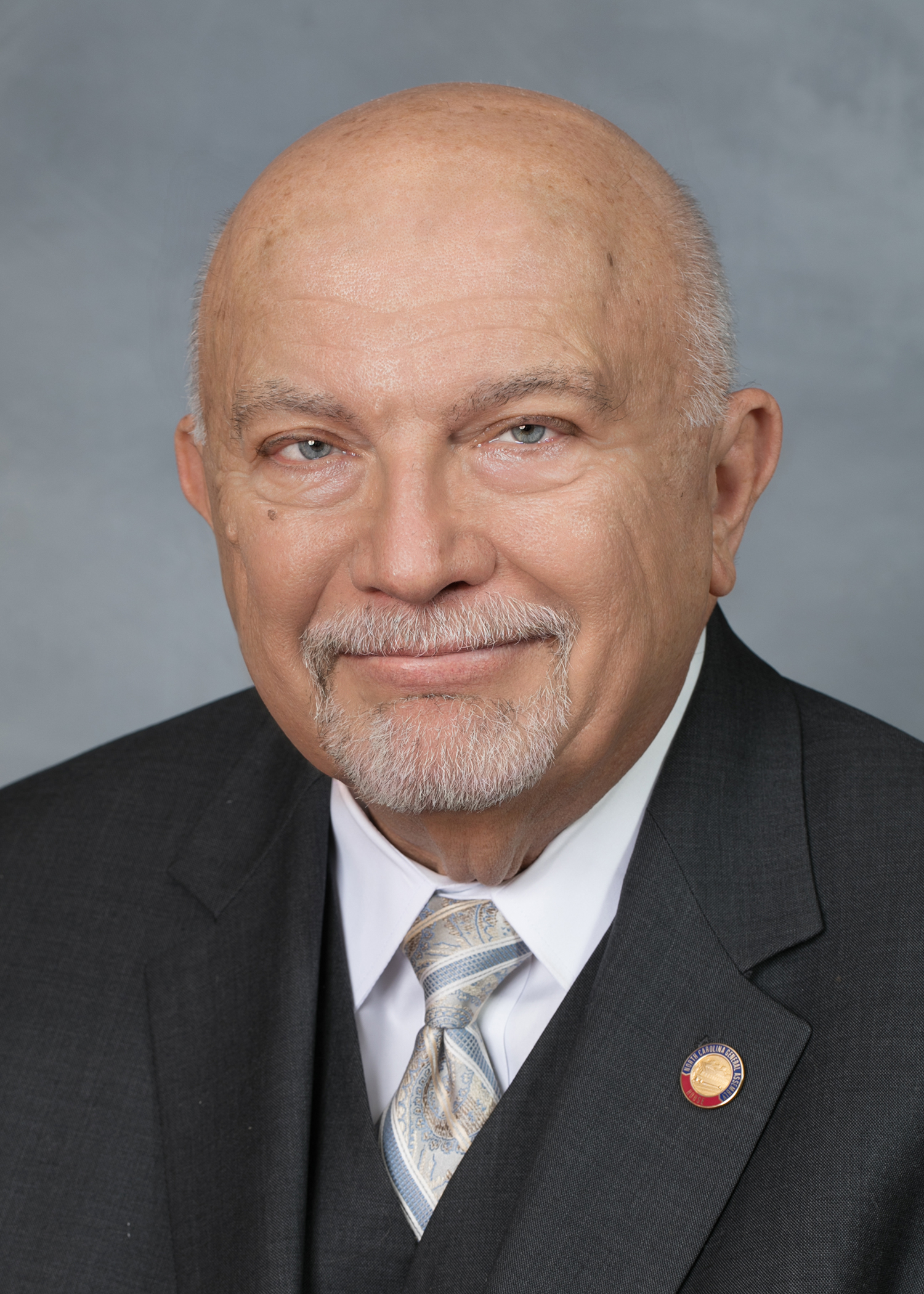

Member of the North Carolina House of Representatives from the 40th district
- In office January 1, 2017 – January 21, 2025
- Preceded by: Marilyn Avila
- Succeeded by: Phil Rubin

Personal details
- Born: Joseph Robert John; October 13, 1939 East Chicago, Indiana, U.S.
- Died: January 22, 2025 (aged 85)
- Party: Democratic
- Spouse: Evelyn
- Children: 3
- Education: University of North Carolina, Chapel Hill (BA, MA, JD)
- Occupation: Judge; lawyer
- Website: Official website

Joseph Robert John Sr. (October 13, 1939 – January 22, 2025) was an American politician and jurist who was a member of the North Carolina House of Representatives, having served from 2017 to 2025. He had formerly been a judge of the North Carolina Court of Appeals from 1992 until 2000. Previously, he had been a state Superior Court and District Court judge, based in Greensboro. He had also been a prosecutor and practiced law at the firm of Pell, Pell, Weston & John.

== Life and career ==
In 2010, John was named interim director of the North Carolina State Bureau of Investigation crime lab by N.C. Attorney General Roy A. Cooper. He was named to the post on a permanent basis in 2011. John retired in 2014.

John was elected as a Democrat to the North Carolina House of Representatives, District 40, in 2016, defeating incumbent Rep. Marilyn Avila. In 2018, John was re-elected to a second term after defeating Avila in a rematch. John won a third term in 2020, defeating Republican challenger Gerald Falzon.

During his time in office, John had focused on fully funding North Carolina schools, eliminating partisan gerrymandering, and fighting against what he called the "War on an Independent Judiciary".

John announced his resignation from the legislature on January 19, 2025, effective January 21st, after his cancer diagnosis was deemed terminal. He died the next day, on January 22, at the age of 85.

== Electoral history ==
=== 2022 ===
North Carolina House of Representatives 40th district Democratic primary election, 2022
Party	Candidate	Votes	%
Democratic	Joe John (incumbent)	5,520	74.10%
Democratic	Marguerite Creel	1,929	25.90%
Total votes		7,449	100%

=== 2020 ===
North Carolina House of Representatives 40th district general election, 2020
Party	Candidate	Votes	%
Democratic	Joe John (incumbent)	31,837	56.47%
Republican	Gerald Falzon	24,545	43.53%
Total votes		56,382	100%
Democratic hold			

=== 2018 ===
North Carolina House of Representatives 40th district general election, 2018
Party	Candidate	Votes	%
Democratic	Joe John (incumbent)	24,193	51.24%
Republican	Marilyn Avila	21,256	45.02%
Libertarian	David Ulmer	1,767	3.74%
Total votes		47,216	100%
Democratic hold			

=== 2016 ===
North Carolina House of Representatives 40th district general election, 2016
Party	Candidate	Votes	%
Democratic	Joe John	23,786	50.41%
Republican	Marilyn Avila (incumbent)	23,402	49.59%
Total votes		47,188	100%
Democratic gain from Republican			

== Committee assignments ==
=== 2021–2022 session ===
- Appropriations
- Appropriations – Justice and Public Safety
- Judiciary II
- Families, Children, and Aging Policy
- Transportation

=== 2019–2020 session ===
- Appropriations
- Appropriations – Justice and Public Safety
- Judiciary
- Families, Children, and Aging Policy
- Transportation

=== 2017–2018 session ===
- Appropriations
- Appropriations – Justice and Public Safety
- Homeland Security, Military, and Veterans Affairs
- Insurance
- Judiciary II
- State and Local Government II

North Carolina House of Representatives
Preceded by Marilyn Avila	Member of the North Carolina House of Representatives from the 40th district 2017-2025	Succeeded by Phil Rubin
