= Marilyn Avila =

American politician (born 1949)

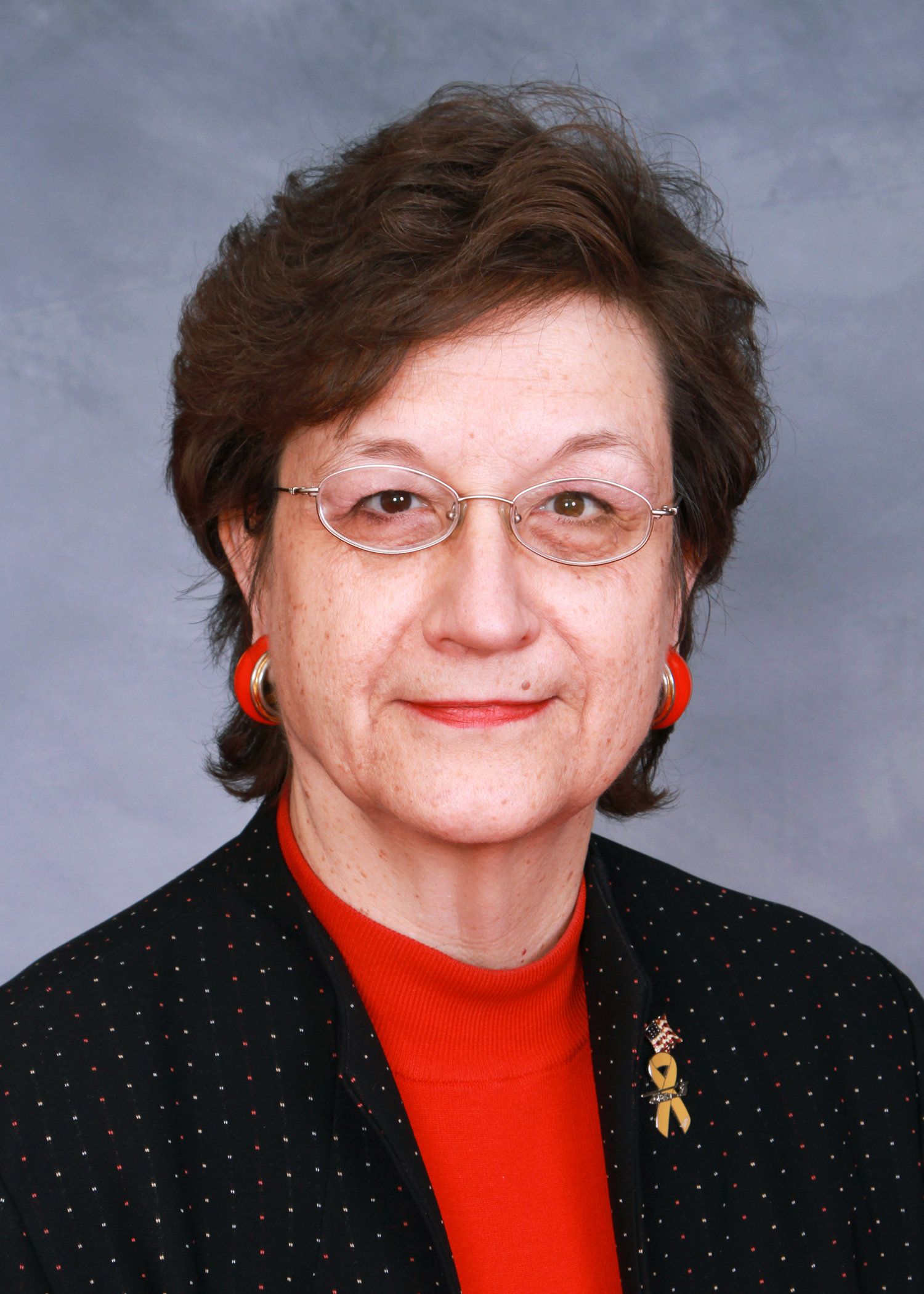

Member of the North Carolina House of Representatives from the 40th district
- In office January 1, 2007 – January 1, 2017
- Preceded by: Rick Eddins
- Succeeded by: Joe John

Personal details
- Born: January 3, 1949 (age 77) Statesboro, Georgia, U.S.
- Party: Republican
- Education: Georgia Southern College (BS)
- Profession: Former Chemist and Business Owner
- Website: Campaign Website

Marilyn Avila (born January 3, 1949) is a former Republican member of the North Carolina House of Representatives. She first won office in the 2006 election, and she represented the state's 40th house district from 2007 until 2017. She was defeated by Democrat Joe John in the 2016 election. In 2018, she attempted to make a comeback for her old seat, but she lost again to John. She chaired the Appropriations Subcommittee on Health and Human Services, Commerce and Job Development Subcommittee on Science and Technology, Unemployment Fraud Task Force. Rep. Avila also sat on the Appropriations Committee, Appropriations Subcommittee on Education, Commerce and Job Development Committee, Education Committee, Ethics Committee, House Select Committee on Certificate of Need Process and Related Hospital Issues, House Select Committee on Education Reform, House Select Committee on State-Owned Assets, State Personnel Committee, and Transportation Committee.

Her professional career includes working as a chemist for HanesBrands, Inc., for the public policy think tank John Locke Foundation and hairstyling salon owner.

== Election results ==
=== 2018 General Election ===
North Carolina House of Representatives 40th district general election, 2018
Party	Candidate	Votes	%
Democratic	Joe John (incumbent)	24,193	51.24%
Republican	Marilyn Avila	21,256	45.02%
Libertarian	David Ulmer	1,767	3.74%
Total votes		47,216	100%
Democratic hold			

=== 2016 General Election ===
North Carolina House of Representatives 40th district general election, 2016
Party	Candidate	Votes	%
Democratic	Joe John	23,786	50.41%
Republican	Marilyn Avila (incumbent)	23,402	49.59%
Total votes		47,188	100%
Democratic gain from Republican			

=== 2014 General Election ===
North Carolina House of Representatives 40th district general election, 2014
Party	Candidate	Votes	%
Republican	Marilyn Avila (incumbent)	16,120	54.30%
Democratic	Margaret E. Broadwell	13,567	45.70%
Total votes		29,687	100%
Republican hold			

=== 2012 General Election ===
North Carolina House of Representatives 40th district general election, 2012
Party	Candidate	Votes	%
Republican	Marilyn Avila (incumbent)	22,613	53.86%
Democratic	William (Watt) Jones	17,541	41.78%
Libertarian	Ron Reale	1,828	4.35%
Total votes		41,982	100%
Republican hold			

=== 2010 General Election ===
North Carolina House of Representatives 40th district general election, 2010
Party	Candidate	Votes	%
Republican	Marilyn Avila (incumbent)	27,686	62.88%
Democratic	Violet Rhinehart	16,345	37.12%
Total votes		44,031	100%
Republican hold			

=== 2008 General Election ===
North Carolina House of Representatives 40th district general election, 2008
Party	Candidate	Votes	%
Republican	Marilyn Avila (incumbent)	35,764	56.68%
Democratic	Stan Morse	27,336	43.32%
Total votes		63,100	100%
Republican hold			

=== 2006 General Election ===
North Carolina House of Representatives 40th district general election, 2006
Party	Candidate	Votes	%
Republican	Marilyn Avila	20,556	100%
Total votes		20,556	100%
Republican hold			

=== 2006 Primary Election ===
North Carolina House of Representatives 40th district Republican primary election, 2006
Party	Candidate	Votes	%
Republican	Marilyn Avila	2,029	65.62%
Republican	Rick Eddins (incumbent)	1,063	34.38%
Total votes		3,092	100%

North Carolina House of Representatives
Preceded by Rick Eddins	Member of the North Carolina House of Representatives from the 40th district 2007-2017	Succeeded by Joe John
