= Jeff Collins (North Carolina politician) =

American politician from North Carolina

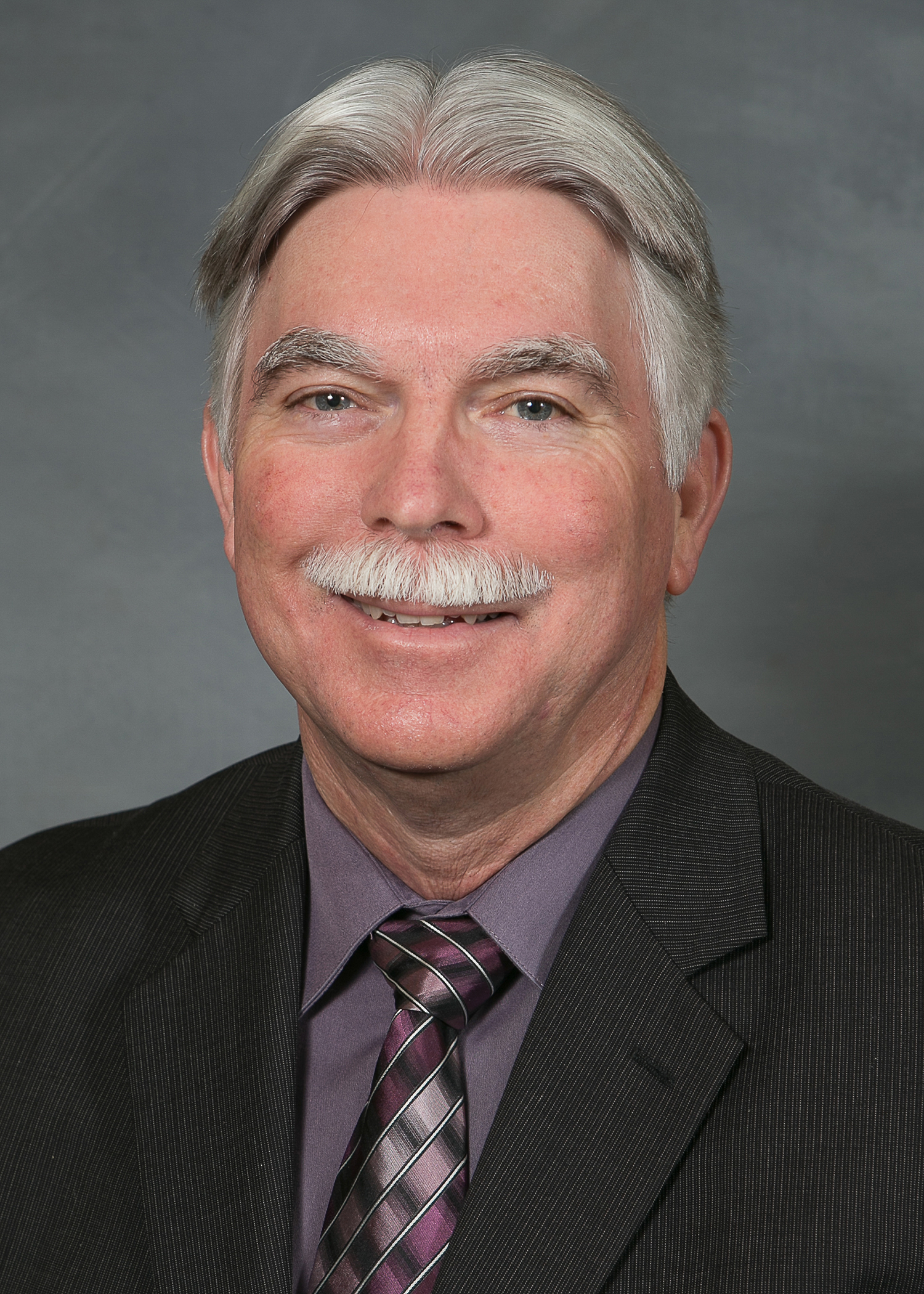

Member of the North Carolina House of Representatives from the 25th district
- In office January 1, 2011 – January 1, 2019
- Preceded by: Randy Stewart
- Succeeded by: James Gailliard

Personal details
- Born: December 19, 1955 (age 70) Rocky Mount, North Carolina, U.S.
- Party: Republican
- Occupation: Businessman

Jeffrey Lynn Collins (born December 19, 1955) is a former Republican member of the North Carolina General Assembly. He represented the 25th district from 2011 until 2019.

== Honors ==
In 2018, Collins was listed as a Champion of the Family in the NC Values Coalition Scorecard.

North Carolina House of Representatives
| Preceded by Randy Stewart | Member of the North Carolina House of Representatives from the 25th district 2011-2019 | Succeeded by James Gailliard |
