= Reece Pyrtle =

American politician

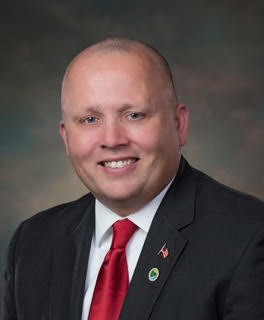
- Official portrait, 2021

Member of the North Carolina House of Representatives from the 65th district
- Incumbent
- Assumed office August 11, 2021
- Preceded by: Jerry Carter

Member of the Rockingham County Board of Commissioners
- In office December 5, 2016 – August 11, 2021
- Preceded by: Zane Cardwell; H. Keith Duncan
- Succeeded by: Don Powell

Personal details
- Born: Armor Reece Pyrtle Jr.
- Party: Republican
- Education: Appalachian State University (BS)
- Website: Official website

Armor Reece Pyrtle Jr. is a Republican member of the North Carolina House of Representatives who has represented the 65th district (including parts of Rockingham County) since 2021. He was appointed in August 2021 to the fill the vacancy left by Jerry Carter, who died in office. A retired police chief from Eden, North Carolina, Pyrtle previously served on the Rockingham County board of commissioners from 2016 to 2021.

== Electoral history ==
=== 2022 ===
North Carolina House of Representatives 65th district Republican primary election, 2022
Party	Candidate	Votes	%
Republican	Reece Pyrtle (incumbent)	5,813	79.86%
Republican	Joseph A. Gibson III	1,466	20.14%
Total votes		7,279	100%

=== 2020 ===
Rockingham County Board of Commissioners Republican primary election, 2020
Party	Candidate	Votes	%
Republican	Mark Richardson (incumbent)	6,108	30.27%
Republican	Kevin Berger (incumbent)	5,624	27.87%
Republican	Reece Pyrtle (incumbent)	5,588	27.70%
Republican	Jimmy Joyce	2,856	14.16%
Total votes		20,176	100%

Rockingham County Board of Commissioners general election, 2020
Party	Candidate	Votes	%
Republican	Mark Richardson (incumbent)	28,404	25.12%
Republican	Reece Pyrtle (incumbent)	28,217	24.95%
Republican	Kevin Berger (incumbent)	26,664	23.58%
Democratic	Ann Brady	16,284	14.40%
Democratic	Jeff Johnson	13,510	11.95%
Total votes		113,079	100%
Republican hold			
Republican hold			
Republican hold			

=== 2016 ===
Rockingham County Board of Commissioners Republican primary election, 2016
Party	Candidate	Votes	%
Republican	Kevin Berger	5,423	20.58%
Republican	Reece Pyrtle	4,568	17.34%
Republican	Mark Richardson (incumbent)	4,263	16.18%
Republican	Don Powell	3,889	14.76%
Republican	Josh Austin	3,156	11.98%
Republican	Mike Manuel	2,225	8.44%
Republican	Dennis Joyce	1,942	7.37%
Republican	Fred Pedone	884	3.35%
Total votes		26,350	100%

Rockingham County Board of Commissioners general election, 2016
Party	Candidate	Votes	%
Republican	Kevin Berger	23,176	23.45%
Republican	Reece Pyrtle	22,808	23.08%
Republican	Mark Richardson (incumbent)	22,534	22.80%
Democratic	Donna Lawson Turner	15,524	15.71%
Democratic	Forrest Bray	12,531	12.68%
Independent	Karen Tucker (write-in)	1,883	1.91%
Write-in		383	0.39%
Total votes		98,839	100%
Republican hold			
Republican hold			
Republican gain from Democratic			

== Committee assignments ==
=== 2021-2022 session ===
- Appropriations
- Appropriations - Justice & Public Safety
- Families, Children, and Aging Policy
- Health
- Homeland Security, Military, and Veterans Affairs
- Judiciary 2
- Local Government - Land Use, Planning & Development

North Carolina House of Representatives
Preceded by Jerry Carter	Member of the North Carolina House of Representatives from the 65th district 2021–present	Incumbent
