= Phil Rubin =

American attorney and politician (born 1983)

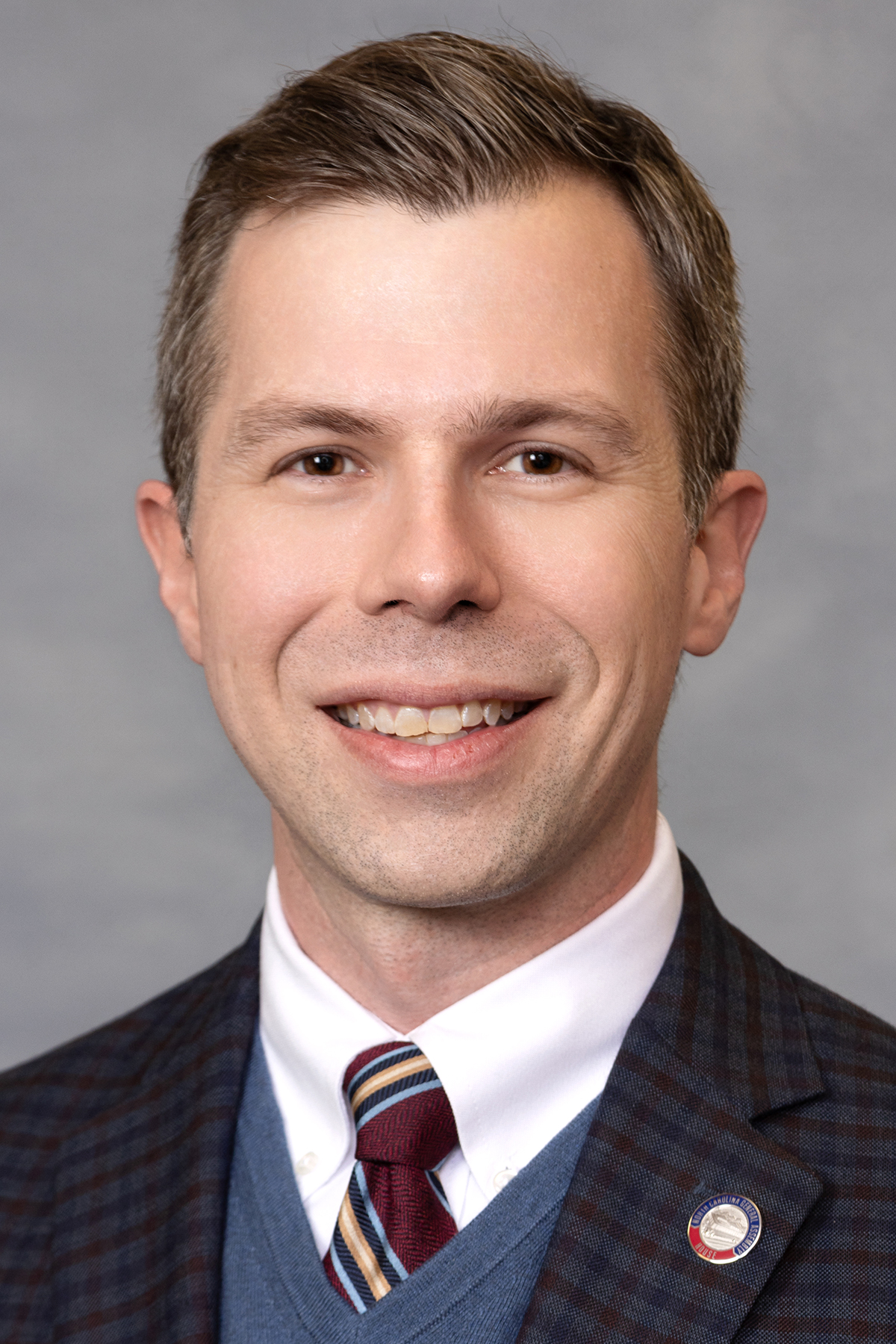

Member of the North Carolina House of Representatives from the 40th district
- Incumbent
- Assumed office January 29, 2025
- Preceded by: Joe John

Personal details
- Born: Phillip Anthony Rubin; August 17, 1983 (age 43)
- Party: Democratic
- Spouse: Katelyn Love
- Relatives: Victoria Groce (sister)
- Education: University of Georgia; Duke University (JD), (MA)
- Website: Official website

Phillip Anthony Rubin (born August 17, 1983) is an American attorney and politician serving in the North Carolina House of Representatives. In 2025, Governor Josh Stein appointed him, a member of the Democratic Party, to fill the seat vacated by the resignation of Rep. Joe John. Upon appointment, Governor Stein praised Rubin for "stepping up to serve the people...[and] improve the lives of all North Carolinians." Rubin was elected to a full term in 2026.

== Early life and career ==
Rubin graduated magna cum laude from the University of Georgia and summa cum laude from Duke University School of Law, where he was editor-in-chief of the Duke Law Journal, member of the Moot Court Board, and fellow at the U.S. Department of Justice and U.S. Department of Commerce.

Rubin served as clerk to Chief Judge David Sentelle of the United States Court of Appeals for the District of Columbia Circuit. Rubin joined the firm of Covington & Burling before his appointment as Assistant United States Attorney in the Eastern District of North Carolina, where he handled constitutional ligation on appeal. Rubin joined the North Carolina Department of Justice as Special Deputy Attorney General, where he defended the SAFE Child Act. Rubin later worked in online child safety and combatting terrorism.

== Personal life ==
Rubin is married to Katelyn Love, who previously served as chief counsel to the North Carolina State Board of Elections, and resides in Raleigh, North Carolina. One of Rubin's sisters is Jeopardy! Masters champion Victoria Groce.
