= Peggy Wilson (Alaska politician) =

American politician (born 1945)

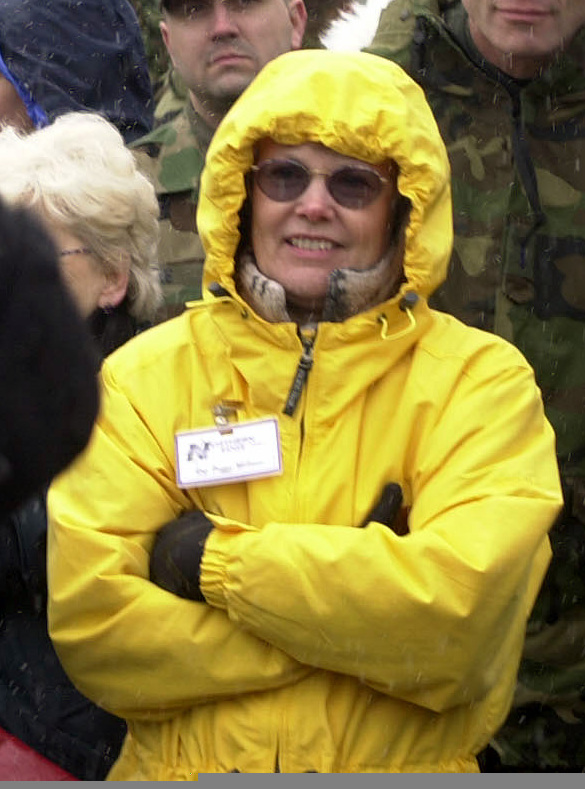
- Wilson in March 2001

Member of the Alaska House of Representatives
- In office January 8, 2001 – January 8, 2015
- Preceded by: Ben Grussendorf
- Succeeded by: Dan Ortiz
- Constituency: 2nd District (2001–2013); 33rd District (2013–2015)

Member of the North Carolina House of Representatives
- In office January 1, 1989 – July 5, 1993
- Preceded by: Robert Lee McAlister
- Succeeded by: Wayne Sexton
- Constituency: 25th District (1989–1993); 73rd District (1993)

Personal details
- Born: September 8, 1945 (age 81) Anamosa, Iowa, U.S.
- Party: Republican
- Spouse: Woody Wilson
- Children: 3
- Education: University of North Carolina at Chapel Hill
- Occupation: Registered nurse

Peggy Wilson (born September 8, 1945) is a former Republican member of the Alaska House of Representatives, who represented the 2nd District from 2001 through 2013 and the 33rd district from 2013 to 2015. She had also served as the majority leader. She had previously served for five years in the North Carolina House of Representatives. Wilson served as Chair of the Transportation Committee, and was a member of the Education Committee, Resources Committee, State Affairs Committee, and the Legislative Council. She also served on the Education & Early Development, Labor & Workforce Development, and Transportation & Public Facilities Finance Subcommittees, for the 26th Legislature. She is also a registered nurse.

== Personal life ==
Representative Wilson has a husband (Woody), three children (Tad, Gina and Chris), eight grandchildren and five great-grandchildren. Peggy Wilson received her Associate of Science in Nursing from Kirkwood Community College in 1973, received her EMT training from the University of Alaska, and graduated from the University of North Carolina at Chapel Hill in Nursing.

North Carolina House of Representatives
Preceded by Robert Lee McAlister	Member of the North Carolina House of Representatives from the 25th district 1989–1993; Served alongside: James Fred Bowman, Bertha Merrill Holt, Rector Samuel Hunt III	Succeeded by Nelson Cole
Preceded by Constituency established	Member of the North Carolina House of Representatives from the 73rd district 1993	Succeeded by Wayne Sexton
Alaska House of Representatives
Preceded by Ben Grussendorf	Member of the Alaska House of Representatives from the 2nd district 2001–2013	Succeeded by Tammie Wilson
Preceded by Kurt Olson	Member of the Alaska House of Representatives from the 33rd district 2013–2015	Succeeded by Dan Ortiz
