= Ken Goodman (politician) =

American politician (born 1947)

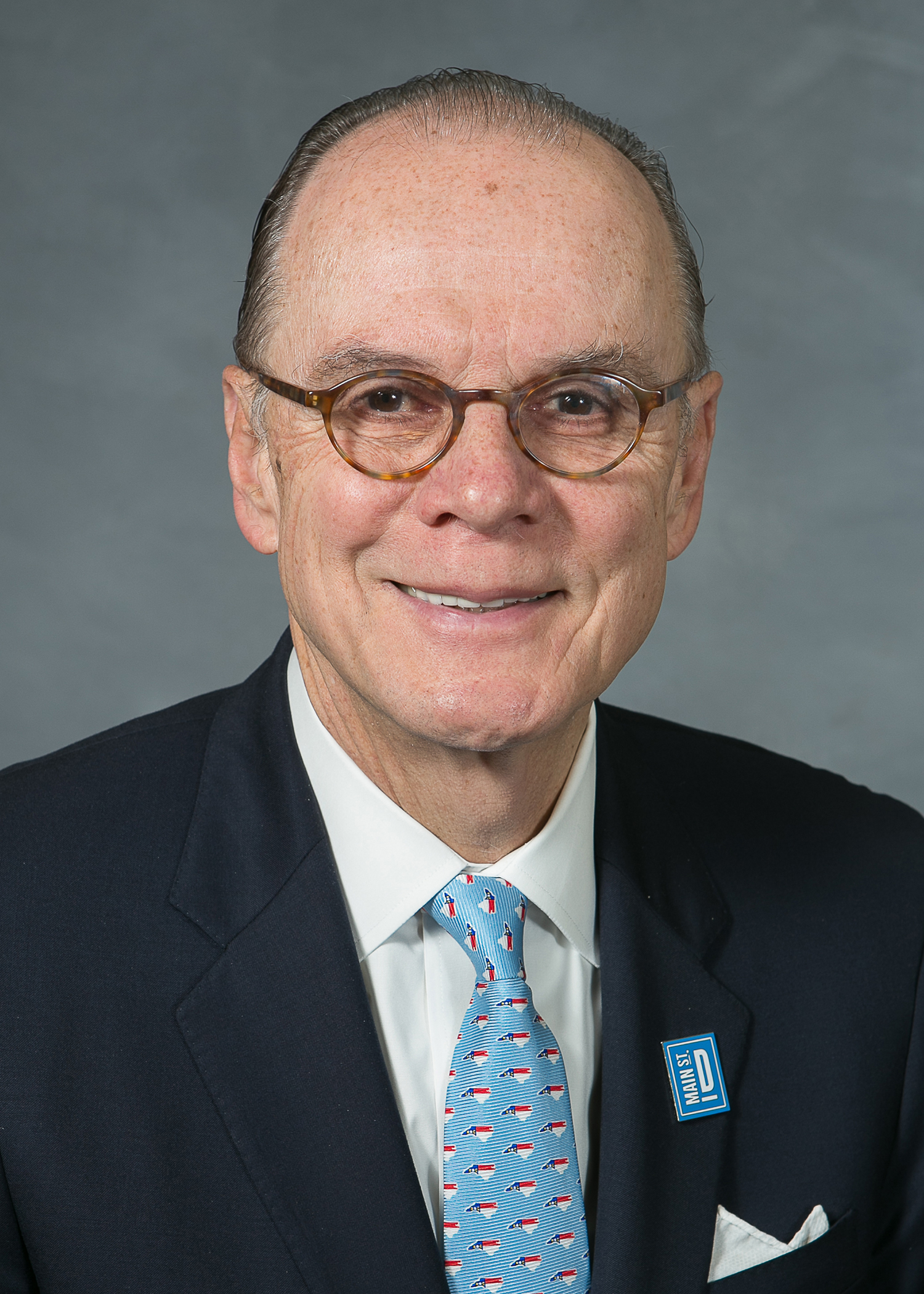

Member of the North Carolina House of Representatives from the 66th district
- In office January 1, 2011 – May 1, 2019
- Preceded by: Melanie Wade Goodwin
- Succeeded by: Scott Brewer

Personal details
- Born: September 17, 1947 (age 79)
- Party: Democratic
- Education: Wingate University (Associate), Florida State University (Bachelor)

Kenneth Leigh Goodman (born September 17, 1947) is an American politician and a former Democratic member of the North Carolina General Assembly. He represented the 66th district. Goodman resigned from the legislature in 2019 to accept an appointment from Gov. Roy Cooper to serve on the North Carolina Industrial Commission.

During the 2016 legislative session, Goodman was one of 11 Democrats to vote in favor of HB2, the controversial "Bathroom Bill."

Goodman graduated from Wingate University for his associate degree, and from Florida State University for his bachelor's degree. Goodman is the son of Richmond County Sheriff R. W. Goodman.

== Electoral history ==
=== 2018 ===
North Carolina House of Representatives 66th district general election, 2018
Party	Candidate	Votes	%
Democratic	Ken Goodman (incumbent)	13,528	51.00%
Republican	Joey Davis	12,432	46.87%
Green	Justin Miller	565	2.13%
Total votes		26,525	100%
Democratic hold			

=== 2016 ===
North Carolina House of Representatives 66th district general election, 2016
Party	Candidate	Votes	%
Democratic	Ken Goodman (incumbent)	23,396	100%
Total votes		23,396	100%
Democratic hold			

=== 2014 ===
North Carolina House of Representatives 66th district general election, 2014
Party	Candidate	Votes	%
Democratic	Ken Goodman (incumbent)	14,697	100%
Total votes		14,697	100%
Democratic hold			

=== 2012 ===
North Carolina House of Representatives 66th district general election, 2012
Party	Candidate	Votes	%
Democratic	Ken Goodman (incumbent)	21,659	100%
Total votes		21,659	100%
Democratic hold			

=== 2010 ===
North Carolina House of Representatives 66th district general election, 2010
Party	Candidate	Votes	%
Democratic	Ken Goodman	11,298	60.68%
Republican	James Haywood Parsons	7,322	39.32%
Total votes		18,620	100%
Democratic hold			

North Carolina House of Representatives
Preceded by Melanie Wade Goodwin	Member of the North Carolina House of Representatives from the 66th district 2011-2019	Succeeded by Scott Brewer
