= North Carolina's 64th House district =

American legislative district

North Carolina's 64th State House of Representatives district
Representative
| Dennis Riddell; R–Snow Camp |
- Demographics: 56% White; 19% Black; 17% Hispanic; 1% Asian; 1% Other; 5% Multiracial
- Population (2024): 90,442

North Carolina's 64th House district is one of 120 districts in the North Carolina House of Representatives. It has been represented by Republican Dennis Riddell since 2013.

== Geography ==
Since 2003, the district has included part of Alamance County. The district overlaps with the 25th Senate district.

== District officeholders ==
| Representative | Party | Dates | Notes | Counties |
|---|---|---|---|---|
District created January 1, 1985.
| Betty Wiser (Raleigh) | Democratic | January 1, 1985 – January 1, 1991 | | 1985–2003; Part of Wake County. |
| Bob Hensley (Raleigh) | Democratic | January 1, 1991 – January 1, 2003 | Redistricted to the 37th district and retired. | 1985–2003; Part of Wake County. |
| Cary Allred (Burlington) | Republican | January 1, 2003 – June 1, 2009 | Redistricted from the 25th district. Resigned. | 2003–Present; Parts of Alamance County. |
| Vacant | | June 1, 2009 – June 12, 2009 | | 2003–Present; Parts of Alamance County. |
| Dan Ingle (Burlington) | Republican | June 12, 2009 – January 1, 2013 | Appointed to finish Allred's term. Retired. | 2003–Present; Parts of Alamance County. |
| Dennis Riddell (Snow Camp) | Republican | January 1, 2013 – Present | | 2003–Present; Parts of Alamance County. |

== Election results ==
=== 2024 ===
North Carolina House of Representatives 64th district general election, 2024
| Party | Candidate | Votes | % |
|---|---|---|---|
| Republican | Dennis Riddell (incumbent) | 24,541 | 54.84% |
| Democratic | LeVon Barnes | 20,212 | 45.16% |
| Total votes | | 44,753 | 100% |
| Republican hold | | | |

=== 2022 ===
North Carolina House of Representatives 64th district general election, 2022
| Party | Candidate | Votes | % |
|---|---|---|---|
| Republican | Dennis Riddell (incumbent) | 20,320 | 62.55% |
| Democratic | Ron Osborne | 12,168 | 37.45% |
| Total votes | | 32,488 | 100% |
| Republican hold | | | |

=== 2020 ===
North Carolina House of Representatives 64th district Republican primary election, 2020
| Party | Candidate | Votes | % |
|---|---|---|---|
| Republican | Dennis Riddell (incumbent) | 6,247 | 83.27% |
| Republican | Peter McClelland | 1,255 | 16.73% |
| Total votes | | 7,502 | 100% |

North Carolina House of Representatives 64th district general election, 2020
| Party | Candidate | Votes | % |
|---|---|---|---|
| Republican | Dennis Riddell (incumbent) | 26,103 | 59.48% |
| Democratic | Eric Henry | 17,786 | 40.52% |
| Total votes | | 43,889 | 100% |
| Republican hold | | | |

=== 2018 ===
North Carolina House of Representatives 64th district Democratic primary election, 2018
| Party | Candidate | Votes | % |
|---|---|---|---|
| Democratic | Cathy Von Hassel-Davies | 1,137 | 53.21% |
| Democratic | Elliott Lynch | 1,000 | 46.79% |
| Total votes | | 2,137 | 100% |

North Carolina House of Representatives 64th district general election, 2018
| Party | Candidate | Votes | % |
|---|---|---|---|
| Republican | Dennis Riddell (incumbent) | 14,942 | 57.83% |
| Democratic | Elliott Lynch | 10,896 | 42.17% |
| Total votes | | 25,838 | 100% |
| Republican hold | | | |

=== 2016 ===
North Carolina House of Representatives 64th district general election, 2016
| Party | Candidate | Votes | % |
|---|---|---|---|
| Republican | Dennis Riddell (incumbent) | 23,857 | 100% |
| Total votes | | 23,857 | 100% |
| Republican hold | | | |

=== 2014 ===
North Carolina House of Representatives 64th district general election, 2014
| Party | Candidate | Votes | % |
|---|---|---|---|
| Republican | Dennis Riddell (incumbent) | 13,346 | 100% |
| Total votes | | 13,346 | 100% |
| Republican hold | | | |

=== 2012 ===
North Carolina House of Representatives 64th district general election, 2012
| Party | Candidate | Votes | % |
|---|---|---|---|
| Republican | Dennis Riddell | 18,296 | 58.99% |
| Democratic | Morris McAdoo | 12,721 | 41.01% |
| Total votes | | 31,017 | 100% |
| Republican hold | | | |

=== 2010 ===
North Carolina House of Representatives 64th district general election, 2010
| Party | Candidate | Votes | % |
|---|---|---|---|
| Republican | Dan Ingle (incumbent) | 19,301 | 100% |
| Total votes | | 19,301 | 100% |
| Republican hold | | | |

=== 2008 ===
North Carolina House of Representatives 64th district general election, 2008
| Party | Candidate | Votes | % |
|---|---|---|---|
| Republican | Cary Allred (incumbent) | 22,122 | 61.38% |
| Democratic | Henry Vines | 13,919 | 38.62% |
| Total votes | | 36,041 | 100% |
| Republican hold | | | |

=== 2006 ===
North Carolina House of Representatives 64th district general election, 2006
| Party | Candidate | Votes | % |
|---|---|---|---|
| Republican | Cary Allred (incumbent) | 12,320 | 100% |
| Total votes | | 12,320 | 100% |
| Republican hold | | | |

=== 2004 ===
North Carolina House of Representatives 64th district Republican primary election, 2004
| Party | Candidate | Votes | % |
|---|---|---|---|
| Republican | Cary Allred (incumbent) | 2,766 | 82.62% |
| Republican | A. J. Glass | 582 | 17.38% |
| Total votes | | 3,348 | 100% |

North Carolina House of Representatives 64th district general election, 2004
| Party | Candidate | Votes | % |
|---|---|---|---|
| Republican | Cary Allred (incumbent) | 22,787 | 100% |
| Total votes | | 22,787 | 100% |
| Republican hold | | | |

=== 2002 ===
North Carolina House of Representatives 64th district Republican primary election, 2002
| Party | Candidate | Votes | % |
|---|---|---|---|
| Republican | Cary Allred (incumbent) | 2,936 | 71.59% |
| Republican | Keith Whited | 1,165 | 28.41% |
| Total votes | | 4,101 | 100% |

North Carolina House of Representatives 64th district general election, 2002
| Party | Candidate | Votes | % |
|---|---|---|---|
| Republican | Cary Allred (incumbent) | 13,901 | 100% |
| Total votes | | 13,901 | 100% |
| Republican hold | | | |

=== 2000 ===
North Carolina House of Representatives 64th district general election, 2000
| Party | Candidate | Votes | % |
|---|---|---|---|
| Democratic | Bob Hensley (incumbent) | 15,140 | 60.72% |
| Republican | Charles L. Moorefield Jr. | 9,152 | 36.71% |
| Libertarian | Thomas A. Luther | 641 | 2.57% |
| Total votes | | 24,933 | 100% |
| Democratic hold | | | |
