= P. Wayne Sexton Sr. =

American politician

Wayne Sexton

Member of the North Carolina House of Representatives
- In office July 12, 1993 – January 1, 2005
- Preceded by: Peggy Wilson
- Succeeded by: Nelson Cole (Redistricting)
- Constituency: 73rd District (1993–2003); 66th District (2003–2005)

Personal details
- Born: Paul Wayne Sexton Sr. August 5, 1942 (age 84) Roanoke, Virginia, U.S.
- Party: Republican
- Education: University of North Carolina at Chapel Hill; United States Army War College; University of the State of New York (BS)
- Profession: grocery retailer, retired colonel

Paul Wayne Sexton Sr. (born August 5, 1942) was a Republican former member of the North Carolina General Assembly representing the state's sixty-sixth House district, including constituents in Forsyth and Rockingham counties. He was appointed to the seat on July 12, 1993, after Peggy Wilson resigned. A retiree from Eden, North Carolina, Sexton served six terms until 2005. He was born in Roanoke, Virginia.

== Electoral history ==
=== 2004 ===
North Carolina House of Representatives 65th district general election, 2004
Party	Candidate	Votes	%
Democratic	Nelson Cole (incumbent)	13,890	52.65%
Republican	Wayne Sexton (incumbent)	12,493	47.35%
Total votes		26,383	100%
Democratic hold			

=== 2002 ===
North Carolina House of Representatives 66th district general election, 2002
Party	Candidate	Votes	%
Republican	Wayne Sexton (incumbent)	14,180	100%
Total votes		14,180	100%
Republican hold			

=== 2000 ===
North Carolina House of Representatives 73rd district general election, 2000
Party	Candidate	Votes	%
Republican	Wayne Sexton (incumbent)	14,100	66.60%
Democratic	Michael Adamson	7,072	33.40%
Total votes		21,172	100%
Republican hold			

North Carolina House of Representatives
Preceded by Peggy Wilson	Member of the North Carolina House of Representatives from the 73rd district 1993–2003	Succeeded by Curtis Blackwood
Preceded by Larry Womble	Member of the North Carolina House of Representatives from the 66th district 2003–2005	Succeeded by Melanie Wade Goodwin
