= Bert Jones (politician) =

American politician from North Carolina

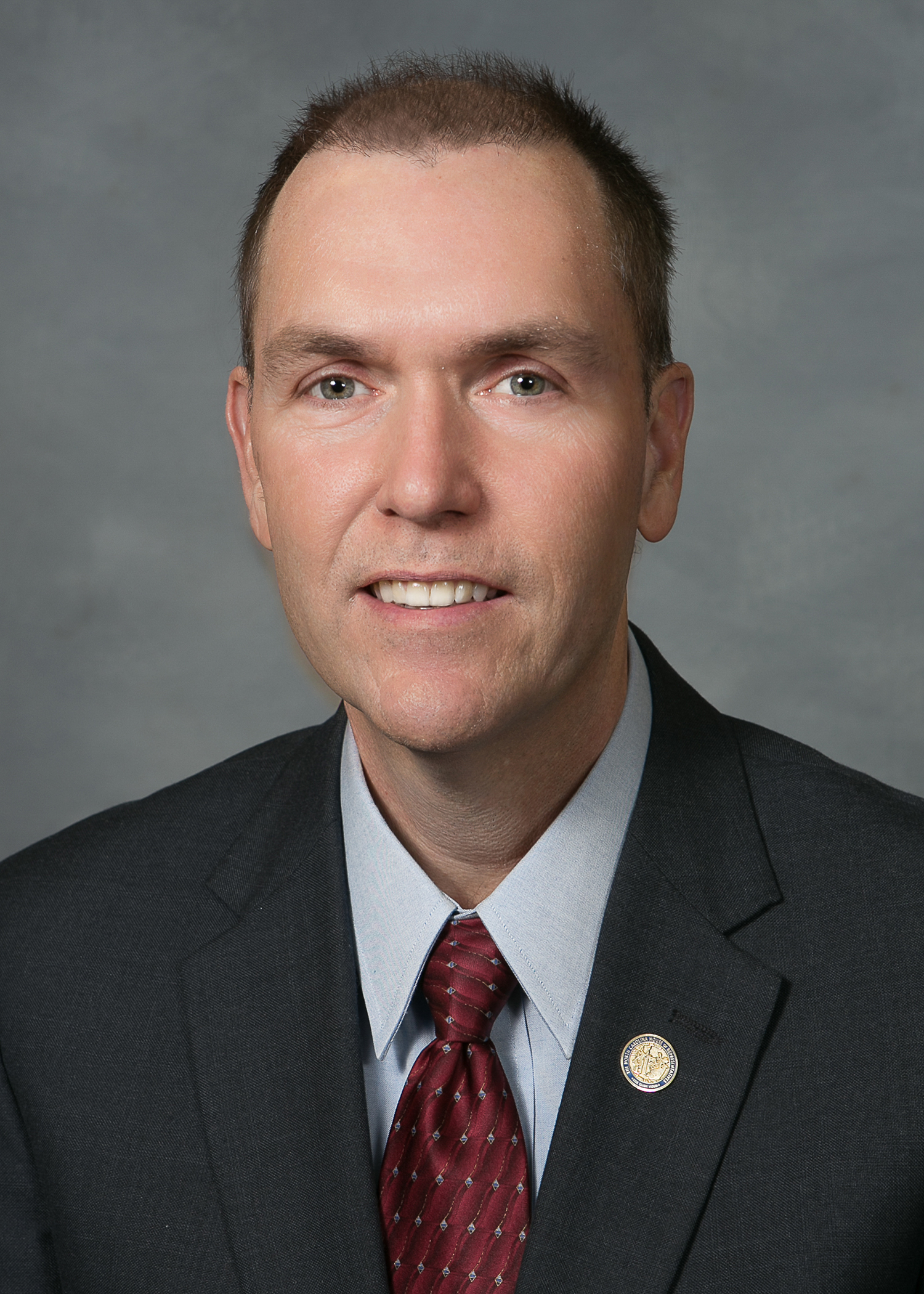

Member of the North Carolina House of Representatives from the 65th district
- In office January 1, 2011 – January 1, 2019
- Preceded by: Nelson Cole
- Succeeded by: Jerry Carter

Personal details
- Born: May 26, 1962 (age 64) Reidsville, North Carolina, U.S.
- Party: Democratic (Before 2011); Republican (2011–present)

Bert Jones (born May 26, 1962) was a politician in the North Carolina General Assembly.

== Honors ==
In 2018, Jones was listed as a Champion of the Family in the NC Values Coalition Scorecard.

== Electoral history ==
=== 2016 ===
North Carolina House of Representatives 65th district general election, 2016
Party	Candidate	Votes	%
Republican	Bert Jones (incumbent)	21,857	60.39%
Democratic	H. Keith Duncan	14,336	39.61%
Total votes		36,193	100%
Republican hold			

=== 2014 ===
North Carolina House of Representatives 65th district general election, 2014
Party	Candidate	Votes	%
Republican	Bert Jones (incumbent)	15,808	65.26%
Democratic	Elretha Perkins	8,416	34.74%
Total votes		24,224	100%
Republican hold			

=== 2012 ===
North Carolina House of Representatives 65th district general election, 2012
Party	Candidate	Votes	%
Republican	Bert Jones (incumbent)	21,324	59.47%
Democratic	William E. Osborne	14,534	40.53%
Total votes		35,858	100%
Republican hold			

=== 2010 ===
North Carolina House of Representatives 65th district general election, 2010
Party	Candidate	Votes	%
Independent	Bert Jones	9,628	56.01%
Democratic	Nelson Cole (incumbent)	7,561	43.99%
Total votes		17,189	100%
Independent gain from Democratic			

=== 2000 ===
North Carolina House of Representatives 25th district general election, 2000
Party	Candidate	Votes	%
Republican	Cary Allred (incumbent)	36,513	18.71%
Republican	W. B. Teague (incumbent)	35,197	18.04%
Democratic	Nelson Cole (incumbent)	34,228	17.54%
Republican	Bert Jones	33,950	17.40%
Democratic	John M. Glenn	32,271	16.54%
Democratic	Danny E. Davis	23,001	11.79%
Total votes		195,160	100%
Republican hold			
Republican hold			
Democratic hold			

North Carolina House of Representatives
Preceded by Nelson Cole	Member of the North Carolina House of Representatives from the 65th district 2011-2019	Succeeded by Jerry Carter
