= Aaron Fussell =

American politician and educator

Aaron Eleazer Fussell (July 5, 1923 – July 7, 2014) was an American politician and educator.

Born in Rose Hill, North Carolina, Fussell served in the United States Army in Europe during World War II, receiving the Bronze Star amongst other accolades. He received his bachelor's degree from Atlantic Christian College, his master's degree from University of North Carolina at Chapel Hill, and did post-graduate work at Duke University and North Carolina State University. He was a teacher and school administrator, serving as principal at Millbrook High School and as the superintendent of the Wake County Public School System. Fussell served in the North Carolina House of Representatives as a Democrat from 1978 to 1994. He died in Raleigh, North Carolina.
