= 2018 North Carolina House of Representatives election =

- November 6, 2018

All 120 seats in the North Carolina House of Representatives 61 seats needed for a majority
- Turnout: 52.97%
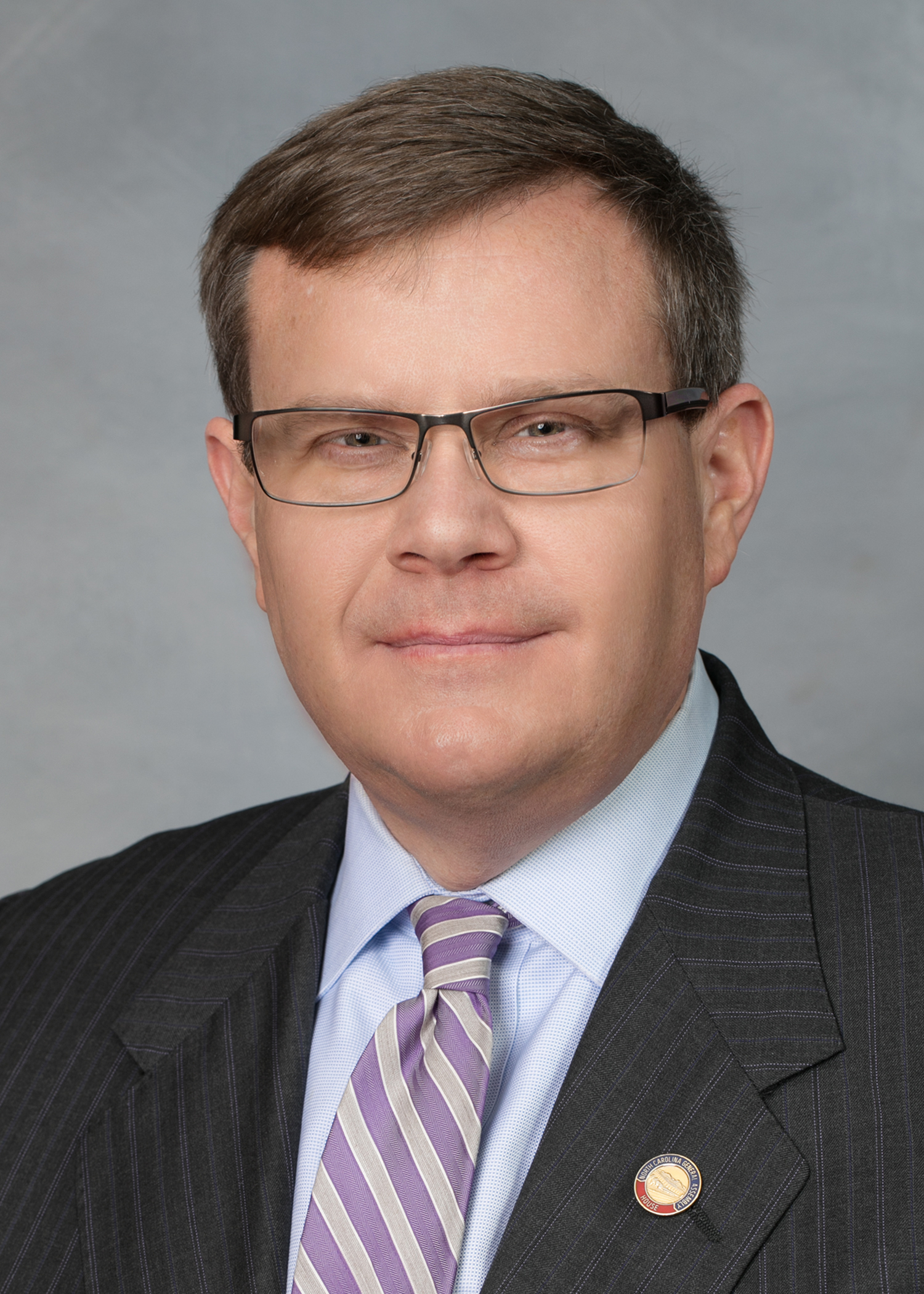

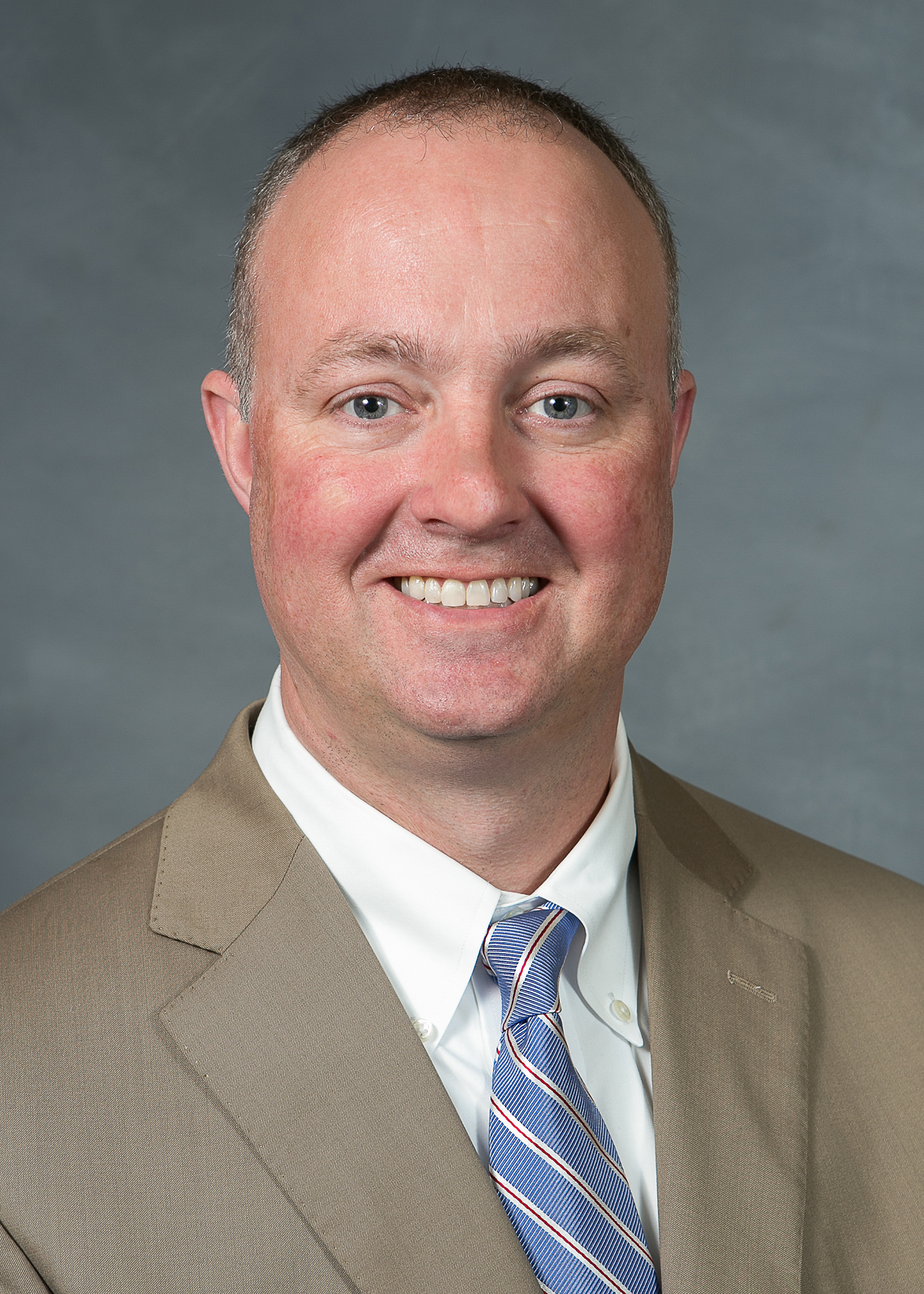
	Majority party	Minority party
Leader	Tim Moore	Darren Jackson
Party	Republican	Democratic
Leader since	January 14, 2015	January 11, 2017
Leader's seat	111th - Kings Mountain	39th - Raleigh
Last election	74	46
Seats before	75 (Note: One Democrat elected in 2016, William Brisson, switched to the Republican Party in 2017.)	45
Seats won	65	55
Seat change	▼10	▲10
Popular vote	1,779,584	1,866,432
Percentage	48.18%	50.54%
Swing	▼3.83%	▲3.86%
- Republican hold Republican gain Democratic hold Democratic gain Republicans: 40-50% 50-60% 60-70% 70-80% Democrats: 50-60% 60-70% 70-80% 80-90%
Speaker before election
Tim Moore
Republican
Elected Speaker
Tim Moore
Republican

An election was held on November 6, 2018, to elect all 120 members to North Carolina's House of Representatives. The election coincided with the elections for other offices, including U.S. House of Representatives and State Senate. The primary election was held on May 8, 2018, with a runoff on June 26, 2018.

Republicans retained control of the House, despite losing the popular vote, but lost their three-fifths supermajority after a net loss of nine seats (compared to the results of the 2016 elections), winning 65 seats compared to 55 seats for the Democrats.

== Results summary ==
District	Incumbent	Party	Elected	Party
1st	Bob Steinburg†	Rep	Ed Goodwin	Rep
2nd	Larry Yarborough	Rep	Larry Yarborough	Rep
3rd	Michael Speciale	Rep	Michael Speciale	Rep
4th	Jimmy Dixon	Rep	Jimmy Dixon	Rep
5th	Howard Hunter III	Dem	Howard Hunter III	Dem
6th	Beverly Boswell	Rep	Bobby Hanig	Rep
7th	Bobbie Richardson	Dem	Lisa Stone Barnes	Rep
8th	Susan Martin	Rep	Kandie Smith	Dem
9th	Greg Murphy	Rep	Greg Murphy	Rep
10th	John Bell	Rep	John Bell	Rep
11th	Duane Hall	Dem	Allison Dahle	Dem
12th	George Graham	Dem	Chris Humphrey	Rep
13th	Pat McElraft	Rep	Pat McElraft	Rep
14th	George Cleveland	Rep	George Cleveland	Rep
15th	Phil Shepard	Rep	Phil Shepard	Rep
16th	Bob Muller†	Rep	Carson Smith	Rep
17th	Frank Iler	Rep	Frank Iler	Rep
18th	Deb Butler	Dem	Deb Butler	Dem
19th	Ted Davis Jr.	Rep	Ted Davis Jr.	Rep
20th	Holly Grange	Rep	Holly Grange	Rep
21st	Larry Bell†	Dem	Raymond Smith Jr.	Dem
22nd	William Brisson	Rep	William Brisson	Rep
23rd	Shelly Willingham	Dem	Shelly Willingham	Dem
24th	Jean Farmer-Butterfield	Dem	Jean Farmer-Butterfield	Dem
25th	Jeff Collins†	Rep	James Gailliard	Dem
26th	Donna McDowell White	Rep	Donna McDowell White	Rep
27th	Michael Wray	Dem	Michael Wray	Dem
28th	Larry Strickland	Rep	Larry Strickland	Rep
29th	MaryAnn Black	Dem	MaryAnn Black	Dem
30th	Marcia Morey	Dem	Marcia Morey	Dem
31st	Mickey Michaux†	Dem	Zack Forde-Hawkins	Dem
32nd	Terry Garrison	Dem	Terry Garrison	Dem
33rd	Rosa Gill	Dem	Rosa Gill	Dem
34th	Grier Martin	Dem	Grier Martin	Dem
35th	Chris Malone	Rep	Terence Everitt	Dem
36th	Nelson Dollar	Rep	Julie von Haefen	Dem
37th	John Adcock	Rep	Sydney Batch	Dem
38th	Yvonne Lewis Holley	Dem	Yvonne Lewis Holley	Dem
39th	Darren Jackson	Dem	Darren Jackson	Dem
40th	Joe John	Dem	Joe John	Dem
41st	Gale Adcock	Dem	Gale Adcock	Dem
42nd	Marvin Lucas	Dem	Marvin Lucas	Dem
43rd	Elmer Floyd	Dem	Elmer Floyd	Dem
44th	Billy Richardson	Dem	Billy Richardson	Dem
45th	John Szoka	Rep	John Szoka	Rep
46th	Brenden Jones	Rep	Brenden Jones	Rep
47th	Charles Graham	Dem	Charles Graham	Dem
48th	Garland Pierce	Dem	Garland Pierce	Dem
49th	Cynthia Ball	Dem	Cynthia Ball	Dem
50th	Graig Meyer	Dem	Graig Meyer	Dem
51st	John Sauls	Rep	John Sauls	Rep
52nd	Jamie Boles	Rep	Jamie Boles	Rep
53rd	David Lewis	Rep	David Lewis	Rep
54th	Robert Reives	Dem	Robert Reives	Dem
55th	Mark Brody	Rep	Mark Brody	Rep
56th	Verla Insko	Dem	Verla Insko	Dem
57th	New Seat		Ashton Clemmons	Dem
58th	Amos Quick	Dem	Amos Quick	Dem
59th	Jon Hardister	Rep	Jon Hardister	Rep
60th	Cecil Brockman	Dem	Cecil Brockman	Dem
61st	Pricey Harrison (Note: Redistricted from the 57th District.)	Dem	Pricey Harrison	Dem
62nd	John Faircloth (Note: Redistricted from the 61st District.)	Rep	John Faircloth	Rep
62nd	John Blust†	Rep	John Faircloth	Rep
63rd	Stephen Ross	Rep	Stephen Ross	Rep
64th	Dennis Riddell	Rep	Dennis Riddell	Rep
65th	Bert Jones†	Rep	Jerry Carter	Rep
66th	Ken Goodman	Dem	Ken Goodman	Dem
67th	Justin Burr	Rep	Wayne Sasser	Rep
68th	Craig Horn	Rep	Craig Horn	Rep
69th	Dean Arp	Rep	Dean Arp	Rep
70th	Pat Hurley	Rep	Pat Hurley	Rep
71st	Evelyn Terry	Dem	Evelyn Terry	Dem
72nd	Derwin Montgomery	Dem	Derwin Montgomery	Dem
73rd	Lee Zachary	Rep	Lee Zachary	Rep
74th	Debra Conrad	Rep	Debra Conrad	Rep
75th	Donny Lambeth	Rep	Donny Lambeth	Rep
76th	Harry Warren (Note: Redistricted from the 77th District.)	Rep	Harry Warren	Rep
76th	Carl Ford†	Rep	Harry Warren	Rep
77th	Julia Craven Howard (Note: Redistricted from the 79th District.)	Rep	Julia Craven Howard	Rep
78th	Allen McNeill	Rep	Allen McNeill	Rep
79th	New Seat		Keith Kidwell	Rep
80th	Sam Watford†	Rep	Steve Jarvis	Rep
81st	Larry Potts	Rep	Larry Potts	Rep
82nd	Linda Johnson (Note: Redistricted from the 83rd District.)	Rep	Linda Johnson	Rep
83rd	Larry Pittman (Note: Redistricted from the 82nd District.)	Rep	Larry Pittman	Rep
84th	Rena Turner	Rep	Rena Turner	Rep
85th	Josh Dobson	Rep	Josh Dobson	Rep
86th	Hugh Blackwell	Rep	Hugh Blackwell	Rep
87th	Destin Hall	Rep	Destin Hall	Rep
88th	Mary Belk	Dem	Mary Belk	Dem
89th	Mitchell Setzer	Rep	Mitchell Setzer	Rep
90th	Sarah Stevens	Rep	Sarah Stevens	Rep
91st	Kyle Hall	Rep	Kyle Hall	Rep
92nd	Chaz Beasley	Dem	Chaz Beasley	Dem
93rd	Jonathan Jordan	Rep	Carl Ray Russell	Dem
94th	Jeffrey Elmore	Rep	Jeffrey Elmore	Rep
95th	John Fraley	Rep	John Fraley	Rep
96th	Jay Adams	Rep	Jay Adams	Rep
97th	Jason Saine	Rep	Jason Saine	Rep
98th	John Bradford	Rep	Christy Clark	Dem
99th	Rodney Moore	Dem	Nasif Majeed	Dem
100th	John Autry	Dem	John Autry	Dem
101st	Beverly Earle†	Dem	Carolyn Logan	Dem
102nd	Becky Carney	Dem	Becky Carney	Dem
103rd	Bill Brawley	Rep	Rachel Hunt	Dem
104th	Andy Dulin	Rep	Brandon Lofton	Dem
105th	Scott Stone	Rep	Wesley Harris	Dem
106th	Carla Cunningham	Dem	Carla Cunningham	Dem
107th	Kelly Alexander	Dem	Kelly Alexander	Dem
108th	John Torbett	Rep	John Torbett	Rep
109th	Dana Bumgardner	Rep	Dana Bumgardner	Rep
110th	Kelly Hastings	Rep	Kelly Hastings	Rep
111th	Tim Moore	Rep	Tim Moore	Rep
112th	David Rogers	Rep	David Rogers	Rep
113th	Cody Henson	Rep	Cody Henson	Rep
114th	Susan Fisher	Dem	Susan Fisher	Dem
115th	John Ager	Dem	John Ager	Dem
116th	Brian Turner	Dem	Brian Turner	Dem
117th	Chuck McGrady	Rep	Chuck McGrady	Rep
118th	Michele Presnell	Rep	Michele Presnell	Rep
119th	Mike Clampitt	Rep	Joe Sam Queen	Dem
120th	Kevin Corbin	Rep	Kevin Corbin	Rep

† - Incumbent not seeking re-election

=== Statewide ===
Party	Candi- dates	Votes		Seats		
Party	Candi- dates	No.	%	No.	+/–	%
Republican Party	118	1,779,584	48.18%	65	▼9	54.17%
Democratic Party	119	1,866,432	50.54%	55	▲9	45.83%
Independent	2	22,288	0.60%	0	Steady	0.00%
Libertarian Party	20	22,074	0.60%	0	Steady	0.00%
Constitution Party	3	2,264	0.06%	0	Steady	0.00%
Green Party	1	565	0.02%	0	Steady	0.00%
Write-in	1	22	0.00%	0	Steady	0.00%
Total	265	3,693,284	100.00%	120	Steady	100.00%

Popular vote
Democratic	50.54%
Republican	48.18%
Other	1.28%

House seats
Republican	54.17%
Democratic	45.83%

=== Incumbents defeated in primary election ===
- Beverly Boswell (R-District 6), defeated by Bobby Hanig (R)
- Duane Hall (D-District 11), defeated by Allison Dahle (D)
- Justin Burr (R-District 67), defeated by Wayne Sasser (R)
- Rodney W. Moore (D-District 99), defeated by Nasif Majeed (D)

=== Incumbents defeated in general election ===
==== Democrats ====
- Bobbie Richardson (D-District 7), defeated by Lisa Stone Barnes (R)
- George Graham (D-District 12), defeated by Chris Humphrey (R)

==== Republicans ====
- Chris Malone (R-District 35), defeated by Terence Everitt (D)
- Nelson Dollar (R-District 36), defeated by Julie von Haefen (D)
- John Adcock (R-District 37), defeated by Sydney Batch (D)
- Jonathan C. Jordan (R-District 93), defeated by Ray Russell (D)
- John Bradford (R-District 98), defeated by Christy Clark (D)
- Bill Brawley (R-District 103), defeated by Rachel Hunt (D)
- Andy Dulin (R-District 104), defeated by Brandon Lofton (D)
- Scott Stone (R-District 105), defeated by Wesley Harris (D)
- Mike Clampitt (R-District 119), defeated by Joe Sam Queen (D)

=== Open seats that changed parties ===
- Susan Martin (R-District 8) did not seek re-election, seat won by Kandie Smith (D)
- Jeff Collins (R-District 25) did not seek re-election, seat won by James Gailliard (D)

== Predictions ==
Source	Ranking	As of
Governing	Likely R	October 8, 2018

== Detailed results ==
=== Districts 1-19 ===
==== District 1 ====
Incumbent Republican Bob Steinburg had represented the 1st district since 2013. Steinburg retired to run for the 1st district in the State Senate. Republican Ed Goodwin won the open seat.

North Carolina House of Representatives 1st district general election, 2018
Party	Candidate	Votes	%
Republican	Ed Goodwin	14,749	53.10%
Democratic	Ronald (Ron) Wesson	13,026	46.90%
Total votes		27,775	100%
Republican hold			

==== District 2 ====
Incumbent Republican Larry Yarborough had represented the 2nd district since 2015.

North Carolina House of Representatives 2nd district general election, 2018
Party	Candidate	Votes	%
Republican	Larry Yarborough (incumbent)	16,124	55.31%
Democratic	Darryl D. Moss	13,026	44.69%
Total votes		29,150	100%
Republican hold			

==== District 3 ====
Incumbent Republican Michael Speciale had represented the 3rd district since 2013.

North Carolina House of Representatives 3rd district general election, 2018
Party	Candidate	Votes	%
Republican	Michael Speciale (incumbent)	14,068	54.90%
Democratic	Barbara Lee	10,874	42.44%
Libertarian	T. Lee Horne III	683	2.67%
Total votes		25,625	100%
Republican hold			

==== District 4 ====
Incumbent Republican Jimmy Dixon had represented the 4th district since 2011.

North Carolina House of Representatives 4th district general election, 2018
Party	Candidate	Votes	%
Republican	Jimmy Dixon (incumbent)	13,546	62.87%
Democratic	Da'Quan Marcell Love	7,515	34.88%
Constitution	Kevin E. Hayes	486	2.26%
Total votes		21,547	100%
Republican hold			

==== District 5 ====
Incumbent Democratic Howard Hunter III had represented the 5th district since 2015.

North Carolina House of Representatives 5th district general election, 2018
Party	Candidate	Votes	%
Democratic	Howard Hunter III (incumbent)	15,206	59.92%
Republican	Phillip Smith	10,172	40.08%
Total votes		25,378	100%
Democratic hold			

==== District 6 ====
Incumbent Republican Beverly Boswell lost the Republican primary to Bobby Hanig. Hanig won the general election.

North Carolina House of Representatives 6th district general election, 2018
Party	Candidate	Votes	%
Republican	Bobby Hanig	18,573	55.03%
Democratic	Tess Judge	15,177	44.97%
Total votes		33,750	100%
Republican hold			

==== District 7 ====
Incumbent Democrat Bobbie Richardson had represented the 7th district since 2013. Richardson was defeated for re-election by Republican Lisa Stone Barnes.

North Carolina House of Representatives 7th district general election, 2018
Party	Candidate	Votes	%
Republican	Lisa Stone Barnes	18,352	58.00%
Democratic	Bobbie Richardson (incumbent)	13,289	42.00%
Total votes		31,641	100%
Republican gain from Democratic			

==== District 8 ====
Incumbent Republican Susan Martin had represented the 8th district since 2013. Martin did not seek re-election. Democrat Kandie Smith won the open seat.

North Carolina House of Representatives 8th district general election, 2018
Party	Candidate	Votes	%
Democratic	Kandie Smith	15,570	64.65%
Republican	Brenda Letchworth Smith	8,515	35.35%
Total votes		24,085	100%
Democratic gain from Republican			

==== District 9 ====
Incumbent Republican Greg Murphy had represented the 9th district since 2015.

North Carolina House of Representatives 9th district general election, 2018
Party	Candidate	Votes	%
Republican	Greg Murphy (incumbent)	17,234	59.96%
Democratic	Kris Rixon	11,510	40.04%
Total votes		28,744	100%
Republican hold			

==== District 10 ====
Incumbent Republican Majority Leader John Bell had represented the 10th district since 2013.

North Carolina House of Representatives 10th district general election, 2018
Party	Candidate	Votes	%
Republican	John Bell (incumbent)	18,838	69.34%
Democratic	Tracy Blackmon	8,329	30.66%
Total votes		27,167	100%
Republican hold			

==== District 11 ====
Incumbent Democrat Duane Hall had represented the 11th district since 2013. Hall lost re-nomination to fellow Democrat Allison Dahle. Dahle won the open seat.

North Carolina House of Representatives 11th district general election, 2018
Party	Candidate	Votes	%
Democratic	Allison Dahle	23,266	69.22%
Republican	Tyler Brooks	9,179	27.31%
Libertarian	Travis Groo	1,166	3.47%
Total votes		33,611	100%
Democratic hold			

==== District 12 ====
Incumbent Democrat George Graham had represented the 12th district since 2013. He was defeated for re-election by Republican Chris Humphrey.

North Carolina House of Representatives 12th district general election, 2018
Party	Candidate	Votes	%
Republican	Chris Humphrey	14,494	56.10%
Democratic	George Graham (incumbent)	11,340	43.90%
Total votes		25,834	100%
Republican gain from Democratic			

==== District 13 ====
Incumbent Republican Pat McElraft had represented the 13th district since 2007.

North Carolina House of Representatives 13th district general election, 2018
Party	Candidate	Votes	%
Republican	Pat McElraft (incumbent)	22,755	72.76%
Independent	Pene diMaio	8,518	27.24%
Total votes		31,273	100%
Republican hold			

==== District 14 ====
Incumbent Republican George Cleveland had represented the 14th district since 2005.

North Carolina House of Representatives 14th district general election, 2018
Party	Candidate	Votes	%
Republican	George Cleveland (incumbent)	10,544	58.82%
Democratic	Isiah (Ike) Johnson	7,381	41.18%
Total votes		17,295	100%
Republican hold			

==== District 15 ====
Incumbent Republican Phil Shepard had represented the 15th district since 2011.

North Carolina House of Representatives 15th district general election, 2018
Party	Candidate	Votes	%
Republican	Phil Shepard (incumbent)	9,076	66.38%
Democratic	Dan Whitten	4,596	33.62%
Total votes		13,672	100%
Republican hold			

==== District 16 ====
Incumbent Republican Bob Muller had represented the 16th district since 2017. Muller did not seek re-election. Republican Carson Smith won the open seat.

North Carolina House of Representatives 16th district general election, 2018
Party	Candidate	Votes	%
Republican	Carson Smith	18,146	59.32%
Democratic	John Johnson	12,443	40.68%
Total votes		30,589	100%
Republican hold			

==== District 17 ====
Incumbent Republican Frank Iler had represented the 17th district since 2009.

North Carolina House of Representatives 17th district general election, 2018
Party	Candidate	Votes	%
Republican	Frank Iler (incumbent)	28,930	63.48%
Democratic	Tom Simmons	16,642	36.52%
Total votes		45,572	100%
Republican hold			

==== District 18 ====
Incumbent Democrat Deb Butler had represented the 18th district since 2017.

North Carolina House of Representatives 18th district general election, 2018
Party	Candidate	Votes	%
Democratic	Deb Butler (incumbent)	17,812	62.43%
Republican	Louis Harmati	9,835	34.47%
Libertarian	Joseph D. Sharp	885	3.10%
Total votes		28,532	100%
Democratic hold			

==== District 19 ====
Incumbent Republican Ted Davis Jr. had represented the 19th district since 2012.

North Carolina House of Representatives 19th district general election, 2018
Party	Candidate	Votes	%
Republican	Ted Davis Jr. (incumbent)	17,957	49.30%
Democratic	Marcia Morgan	17,075	46.88%
Libertarian	David Perry	1,389	3.81%
Total votes		36,421	100%
Republican hold			

=== Districts 20-39 ===
==== District 20 ====
Incumbent Republican Holly Grange had represented the 20th district since 2016.

North Carolina House of Representatives 20th district general election, 2018, 2018
Party	Candidate	Votes	%
Republican	Holly Grange (incumbent)	18,979	52.66%
Democratic	Leslie Cohen	17,062	47.34%
Total votes		36,041	100%
Republican hold			

==== District 21 ====
Incumbent Democrat Larry Bell had represented the 21st district and its predecessors since 2001. Bell did not seek re-election and was succeeded by Raymond Smith Jr.

North Carolina House of Representatives 21st district general election, 2018
Party	Candidate	Votes	%
Democratic	Raymond Smith Jr.	12,041	52.65%
Republican	Robert E. Freeman	10,829	47.35%
Total votes		22,870	100%
Democratic hold			

==== District 22 ====
Incumbent Republican William Brisson had represented the 22nd district since 2007. In 2017, Brisson switched from the Democratic to Republican Party.

North Carolina House of Representatives 22nd district general election, 2018
Party	Candidate	Votes	%
Republican	William Brisson (incumbent)	15,423	56.69%
Democratic	Martin (Tony) Denning	11,783	43.31%
Total votes		27,206	100%
Republican hold			

==== District 23 ====
Incumbent Democrat Shelly Willingham had represented the 23rd district since 2015.

North Carolina House of Representatives 23rd district general election, 2018
Party	Candidate	Votes	%
Democratic	Shelly Willingham (incumbent)	15,959	60.85%
Republican	Claiborne Holtzman	10,266	39.15%
Total votes		26,225	100%
Democratic hold			

==== District 24 ====
Incumbent Democrat Jean Farmer-Butterfield had represented the 24th district since 2003.

North Carolina House of Representatives 24th district general election, 2018
Party	Candidate	Votes	%
Democratic	Jean Farmer-Butterfield (incumbent)	14,219	50.80%
Independent	Ken Fontenot	13,770	49.20%
Total votes		27,989	100%
Democratic hold			

==== District 25 ====
Incumbent Republican Jeff Collins had represented the 25th district since 2011. He did not seek re-election. Democrat James Gailliard won the open seat.

North Carolina House of Representatives 25th district general election, 2018, 2018
Party	Candidate	Votes	%
Democratic	James Gailliard	15,858	51.52%
Republican	John M. Check	13,873	45.07%
Libertarian	Nick Taylor	1,047	3.40%
Total votes		30,778	100%
Democratic gain from Republican			

==== District 26 ====
Incumbent Republican Donna McDowell White had represented the 26th district since 2017.

North Carolina House of Representatives 26th district general election, 2018
Party	Candidate	Votes	%
Republican	Donna McDowell White (incumbent)	22,770	59.84%
Democratic	Linda Bennett	15,283	40.16%
Total votes		38,053	100%
Republican hold			

==== District 27 ====
Incumbent Democrat Michael Wray had represented the 27th district since 2005.

North Carolina House of Representatives 27th district general election, 2018
Party	Candidate	Votes	%
Democratic	Michael Wray (incumbent)	16,783	69.33%
Republican	Raymond (Ray) Dyer	7,426	30.67%
Total votes		24,209	100%
Democratic hold			

==== District 28 ====
Incumbent Republican Larry Strickland had represented the 28th district since 2017.

North Carolina House of Representatives 28th district general election, 2018
Party	Candidate	Votes	%
Republican	Larry Strickland (incumbent)	17,237	63.19%
Democratic	Jimmie M. Massengill	9,373	34.36%
Libertarian	Walt Rabon	670	2.46%
Total votes		27,280	100%
Republican hold			

==== District 29 ====
Incumbent Democrat MaryAnn Black had represented the 29th district since 2017.

North Carolina House of Representatives 29th district general election, 2018
Party	Candidate	Votes	%
Democratic	MaryAnn Black (incumbent)	32,757	88.15%
Republican	Charles Becker	4,402	11.85%
Total votes		37,159	100%
Democratic hold			

==== District 30 ====
Incumbent Democrat Marcia Morey had represented the 30th district since 2017.

North Carolina House of Representatives 30th district general election, 2018
Party	Candidate	Votes	%
Democratic	Marcia Morey (incumbent)	30,303	73.84%
Republican	B. Angelo Burch Sr.	9,862	24.03%
Libertarian	Matthew Wagoner	872	2.12%
Total votes		41,037	100%
Democratic hold			

==== District 31 ====
Incumbent Democrat Mickey Michaux had represented the 31st district and its predecessors since 1983. Michaux did not seek re-election and was succeeded by Democrat Zack Forde-Hawkins.

North Carolina House of Representatives 31st district general election, 2018
Party	Candidate	Votes	%
Democratic	Zack Forde-Hawkins	30,613	81.00%
Republican	Torian Webson	6,002	15.88%
Libertarian	Erik Raudsep	1,179	3.12%
Total votes		37,794	100%
Democratic hold			

==== District 32 ====
Incumbent Democrat Terry Garrison had represented the 32nd district since 2017.

North Carolina House of Representatives 32nd district general election, 2018
Party	Candidate	Votes	%
Democratic	Terry Garrison (incumbent)	17,822	64.27%
Republican	Robert Shingler	9,909	35.73%
Total votes		27,731	100%
Democratic hold			

==== District 33 ====
Incumbent Democrat Rosa Gill had represented the 33rd district since 2009.

North Carolina House of Representatives 33rd district general election, 2018
Party	Candidate	Votes	%
Democratic	Rosa Gill (incumbent)	23,900	78.70%
Republican	Anne Murtha	6,468	21.30%
Total votes		30,368	100%
Democratic hold			

==== District 34 ====
Incumbent Democrat Grier Martin had represented the 34th district since 2013.

North Carolina House of Representatives 34th district general election, 2018
Party	Candidate	Votes	%
Democratic	Grier Martin (incumbent)	26,348	65.51%
Republican	Catherine Whiteford	12,903	32.08%
Libertarian	Cap Hayes	970	2.41%
Total votes		40,221	100%
Democratic hold			

==== District 35 ====
Incumbent Republican Chris Malone had represented the 35th district since 2013. Malone lost re-election to Democrat Terence Everitt.

North Carolina House of Representatives 35th district general election, 2018
Party	Candidate	Votes	%
Democratic	Terence Everitt	23,187	51.09%
Republican	Chris Malone (incumbent)	20,668	45.54%
Libertarian	Michael Nelson	1,532	3.38%
Total votes		45,387	100%
Democratic gain from Republican			

==== District 36 ====
Incumbent Republican Nelson Dollar had represented the 36th district since 2005. Dollar lost re-election to Democrat Julie von Haefen.

North Carolina House of Representatives 36th district general election, 2018
Party	Candidate	Votes	%
Democratic	Julie von Haefen	21,551	49.52%
Republican	Nelson Dollar (incumbent)	20,667	47.49%
Libertarian	Robyn Haley Pegram	1,305	3.00%
Total votes		43,523	100%
Democratic gain from Republican			

==== District 37 ====
Incumbent Republican John Adcock had represented the 37th district since 2018. Adcock lost re-election to Democrat Sydney Batch.

North Carolina House of Representatives 37th district general election, 2018
Party	Candidate	Votes	%
Democratic	Sydney Batch	22,803	49.92%
Republican	John Adcock (incumbent)	21,859	47.85%
Libertarian	Guy Meilleur	1,018	2.23%
Total votes		45,680	100%
Democratic gain from Republican			

==== District 38 ====
Incumbent Democrat Yvonne Lewis Holley had represented the 38th district since 2013.

North Carolina House of Representatives 38th district general election, 2018
Party	Candidate	Votes	%
Democratic	Yvonne Lewis Holley (incumbent)	23,985	81.90%
Republican	Ken Bagnal	4,532	15.48%
Libertarian	Bobby Yates Emory	768	2.62%
Total votes		29,285	100%
Democratic hold			

==== District 39 ====
Incumbent Democratic Minority Leader Darren Jackson had represented the 39th district since 2009.

North Carolina House of Representatives 39th district general election, 2018
Party	Candidate	Votes	%
Democratic	Darren Jackson (incumbent)	24,172	66.40%
Republican	Rhonda Allen	11,441	31.43%
Total votes		36,402	100%
Democratic hold			

=== Districts 40-59 ===
==== District 40 ====
Incumbent Democrat Joe John had represented the 40th district since 2017.

North Carolina House of Representatives 40th district general election, 2018
Party	Candidate	Votes	%
Democratic	Joe John (incumbent)	24,193	51.24%
Republican	Marilyn Avila	21,256	45.02%
Libertarian	David Ulmer	1,767	3.74%
Total votes		47,216	100%
Democratic hold			

==== District 41 ====
Incumbent Democrat Gale Adcock had represented the 41st district since 2015.

North Carolina House of Representatives 41st district general election, 2018
Party	Candidate	Votes	%
Democratic	Gale Adcock (incumbent)	26,631	66.76%
Republican	Emmanuel Wilder	13,262	33.24%
Total votes		39,893	100%
Democratic hold			

==== District 42 ====
Incumbent Democrat Marvin Lucas had represented the 42nd district since 2001.

North Carolina House of Representatives 42nd district general election, 2018
Party	Candidate	Votes	%
Democratic	Marvin Lucas (incumbent)	13,100	76.05%
Republican	Ed Williams	3,684	21.39%
Constitution	Mark A. Crowe	442	2.57%
Total votes		17,226	100%
Democratic hold			

==== District 43 ====
Incumbent Democrat Elmer Floyd had represented the 43rd district since 2009.

North Carolina House of Representatives 43rd district general election, 2018
Party	Candidate	Votes	%
Democratic	Elmer Floyd (incumbent)	16,175	74.13%
Republican	John Czajkowski	5,646	25.87%
Total votes		21,821	100%
Democratic hold			

==== District 44 ====
Incumbent Democrat Billy Richardson had represented the 44th district since 2015.

North Carolina House of Representatives 44th district general election, 2018
Party	Candidate	Votes	%
Democratic	Billy Richardson (incumbent)	13,448	56.56%
Republican	Linda Devore	10,328	43.44%
Total votes		23,776	100%
Democratic hold			

==== District 45 ====
Incumbent Republican John Szoka had represented the 45th district since 2013.

North Carolina House of Representatives 45th district general election, 2018
Party	Candidate	Votes	%
Republican	John Szoka (incumbent)	17,280	58.36%
Democratic	Albeiro (Al) Florez	12,330	41.64%
Total votes		29,610	100%
Republican hold			

==== District 46 ====
Incumbent Republican Brenden Jones had represented the 46th district since 2017.

North Carolina House of Representatives 46th district general election, 2018
Party	Candidate	Votes	%
Republican	Brenden Jones (incumbent)	12,687	63.35%
Democratic	Barbara S. Yates-Lockamy	7,339	36.65%
Total votes		20,026	100%
Republican hold			

==== District 47 ====
Incumbent Democrat Charles Graham had represented the 47th district since 2011.

North Carolina House of Representatives 47th district general election, 2018
Party	Candidate	Votes	%
Democratic	Charles Graham (incumbent)	11,496	58.91%
Republican	Jarrod Lowery	8,018	41.09%
Total votes		19,514	100%
Democratic hold			

==== District 48 ====
Incumbent Democrat Garland Pierce had represented the 48th district since 2005.

North Carolina House of Representatives 48th district general election, 2018
Party	Candidate	Votes	%
Democratic	Garland Pierce (incumbent)	14,619	62.85%
Republican	Russell Walker	8,641	37.15%
Total votes		23,260	100%
Democratic hold			

==== District 49 ====
Incumbent Democrat Cynthia Ball had represented the 49th district since 2017.

North Carolina House of Representatives 49th district general election, 2018
Party	Candidate	Votes	%
Democratic	Cynthia Ball (incumbent)	27,538	66.27%
Republican	David Robertson	12,929	31.11%
Libertarian	Jonathan Horst	1,086	2.61%
Total votes		41,553	100%
Democratic hold			

==== District 50 ====
Incumbent Democrat Graig Meyer had represented the 50th district since 2013.

North Carolina House of Representatives 50th district general election, 2018
Party	Candidate	Votes	%
Democratic	Graig Meyer (incumbent)	23,292	62.11%
Republican	Kenneth Price Rothrock	14,210	37.89%
Total votes		37,502	100%
Democratic hold			

==== District 51 ====
Incumbent Republican John Sauls had represented the 51st district since 2017.

North Carolina House of Representatives 51st district general election, 2018
Party	Candidate	Votes	%
Republican	John Sauls (incumbent)	13,707	52.79%
Democratic	Lisa D. Mathis	12,259	47.21%
Total votes		25,966	100%
Republican hold			

==== District 52 ====
Incumbent Republican Jamie Boles had represented the 52nd district since 2009.

North Carolina House of Representatives 52nd district general election, 2018
Party	Candidate	Votes	%
Republican	Jamie Boles (incumbent)	22,438	62.71%
Democratic	Lowell Simon	13,342	37.29%
Total votes		35,780	100%
Republican hold			

==== District 53 ====
Incumbent Republican David Lewis had represented the 53rd district since 2003.

North Carolina House of Representatives 53rd district general election, 2018
Party	Candidate	Votes	%
Republican	David Lewis (incumbent)	17,201	62.99%
Democratic	Richard Chapman	10,108	37.01%
Total votes		27,309	100%
Republican hold			

==== District 54 ====
Incumbent Democrat Robert Reives had represented the 54th district since 2014.

North Carolina House of Representatives 54th district general election, 2018
Party	Candidate	Votes	%
Democratic	Robert Reives (incumbent)	29,664	63.27%
Republican	Jay Stobbs	17,219	36.73%
Total votes		46,883	100%
Democratic hold			

==== District 55 ====
Incumbent Republican Mark Brody had represented the 55th district since 2013.

North Carolina House of Representatives 55th district general election, 2018
Party	Candidate	Votes	%
Republican	Mark Brody (incumbent)	18,412	65.29%
Democratic	Frank Deese	9,790	34.71%
Total votes		28,202	100%
Republican hold			

==== District 56 ====
Incumbent Democrat Verla Insko had represented the 56th district since 1997.

North Carolina House of Representatives 56th district general election, 2018
Party	Candidate	Votes	%
Democratic	Verla Insko (incumbent)	32,286	86.15%
Republican	Marcus Cooke	4,235	11.30%
Libertarian	Matthew P. Clements	955	2.55%
Total votes		37,476	100%
Democratic hold			

==== District 57 ====
The new 57th district is an open seat in Guilford County which is expected to favor Democrats. Ashton Clemmons won the open seat.

North Carolina House of Representatives 57th district general election, 2018
Party	Candidate	Votes	%
Democratic	Ashton Clemmons	22,443	67.57%
Republican	Troy Lawson	10,773	32.43%
Total votes		33,216	100%
Democratic win (new seat)			

==== District 58 ====
Incumbent Democrat Amos Quick had represented the 58th district since 2017.

North Carolina House of Representatives 58th district general election, 2018
Party	Candidate	Votes	%
Democratic	Amos Quick (incumbent)	21,385	76.78%
Republican	Peter Boykin	6,467	23.22%
Total votes		27,852	100%
Democratic hold			

==== District 59 ====
Incumbent Republican Jon Hardister had represented the 59th district since 2013.

North Carolina House of Representatives 59th district general election, 2018
Party	Candidate	Votes	%
Republican	Jon Hardister (incumbent)	22,119	56.65%
Democratic	Steven A. Buccini	16,924	43.35%
Total votes		39,043	100%
Republican hold			

=== Districts 60-79 ===
==== District 60 ====
Incumbent Democrat Cecil Brockman had represented the 60th district since 2015.

North Carolina House of Representatives 60th district general election, 2018
Party	Candidate	Votes	%
Democratic	Cecil Brockman (incumbent)	17,718	69.04%
Republican	Kurt Collins	7,947	30.96%
Total votes		25,665	100%
Democratic hold			

==== District 61 ====
The new 61st district overlaps with much of the former 57th district. Incumbent Democrat Pricey Harrison, who had represented the 57th district since 2005, successfully sought re-election here.

North Carolina House of Representatives 61st district general election, 2018
Party	Candidate	Votes	%
Democratic	Pricey Harrison (incumbent)	25,469	73.30%
Republican	Alissa Batts	9,275	26.70%
Total votes		34,744	100%
Democratic hold			

==== District 62 ====
The new 62nd district includes the homes of incumbent Republicans John Blust, who had represented the 62nd District since 2001, and John Faircloth, who had represented the 61st district since 2011. Blust retired while Faircloth successfully sought re-election here.

North Carolina House of Representatives 62nd district general election, 2018
Party	Candidate	Votes	%
Republican	John Faircloth (incumbent)	22,568	57.29%
Democratic	Martha R. Shafer	16,823	42.71%
Total votes		39,391	100%
Republican hold			

==== District 63 ====
Incumbent Republican Stephen Ross had represented the 63rd district since 2013.

North Carolina House of Representatives 63rd district general election, 2018
Party	Candidate	Votes	%
Republican	Stephen Ross (incumbent)	15,311	50.49%
Democratic	Erica McAdoo	15,013	49.51%
Total votes		30,324	100%
Republican hold			

==== District 64 ====
Incumbent Republican Dennis Riddell had represented the 64th district since 2013.

North Carolina House of Representatives 64th district general election, 2018
Party	Candidate	Votes	%
Republican	Dennis Riddell (incumbent)	14,942	57.83%
Democratic	Elliott Lynch	10,896	42.17%
Total votes		25,838	100%
Republican hold			

==== District 65 ====
Incumbent Republican Bert Jones had represented the 65th district since 2011. Jones did not seek re-election. Republican Jerry Carter was elected to succeed him.

North Carolina House of Representatives 65th district general election, 2018
Party	Candidate	Votes	%
Republican	Jerry Carter	16,464	57.38%
Democratic	Michael H. (Mike) Lee	10,007	34.88%
Libertarian	Houston Barrow	2,220	7.74%
Total votes		28,691	100%
Republican hold			

==== District 66 ====
Incumbent Democrat Ken Goodman had represented the 66th district since 2011.

North Carolina House of Representatives 66th district general election, 2018
Party	Candidate	Votes	%
Democratic	Ken Goodman (incumbent)	13,528	51.00%
Republican	Joey Davis	12,432	46.87%
Green	Justin Miller	565	2.13%
Total votes		26,525	100%
Democratic hold			

==== District 67 ====
Incumbent Republican Justin Burr had represented the 67th district since 2009. Burr lost the Republican primary to Wayne Sasser. Sasser won the general election.

North Carolina House of Representatives 67th district general election, 2018
Party	Candidate	Votes	%
Republican	Wayne Sasser	24,040	72.42%
Democratic	Karen Webster	8,006	24.12%
Libertarian	Michael Finn	1,150	3.46%
Total votes		33,196	100%
Republican hold			

==== District 68 ====
Incumbent Republican Craig Horn had represented the 68th district since 2011.

North Carolina House of Representatives 68th district general election, 2018
Party	Candidate	Votes	%
Republican	Craig Horn (incumbent)	21,138	58.48%
Democratic	Rick Foulke	15,009	41.52%
Total votes		36,147	100%
Republican hold			

==== District 69 ====
Incumbent Republican Dean Arp had represented the 69th district since 2013.

North Carolina House of Representatives 69th district general election, 2018
Party	Candidate	Votes	%
Republican	Dean Arp (incumbent)	18,029	60.27%
Democratic	Jennifer Benson	11,887	39.73%
Total votes		29,916	100%
Republican hold			

==== District 70 ====
Incumbent Republican Pat Hurley had represented the 70th district since 2007.

North Carolina House of Representatives 70th district general election, 2018
Party	Candidate	Votes	%
Republican	Pat Hurley (incumbent)	18,717	76.91%
Democratic	Mary Rulli	5,620	23.09%
Total votes		24,337	100%
Republican hold			

==== District 71 ====
Incumbent Democrat Evelyn Terry had represented the 71st district since 2013.

North Carolina House of Representatives 71st district general election, 2018
Party	Candidate	Votes	%
Democratic	Evelyn Terry (incumbent)	18,242	72.67%
Republican	Scott Arnold	6,861	27.33%
Total votes		25,103	100%
Democratic hold			

==== District 72 ====
Incumbent Democrat Derwin Montgomery had represented the 72nd district since 2018.

North Carolina House of Representatives 72nd district general election, 2018
Party	Candidate	Votes	%
Democratic	Derwin Montgomery (incumbent)	19,292	79.11%
Republican	Reginald Reid	5,093	20.89%
Total votes		24,385	100%
Democratic hold			

==== District 73 ====
Incumbent Republican Lee Zachary had represented the 73rd district since 2015.

North Carolina House of Representatives 73rd district general election, 2018
Party	Candidate	Votes	%
Republican	Lee Zachary (incumbent)	19,763	64.10%
Democratic	William Stinson	11,070	35.90%
Total votes		30,833	100%
Republican hold			

==== District 74 ====
Incumbent Republican Debra Conrad had represented the 74th district since 2013.

North Carolina House of Representatives 74th district general election, 2018
Party	Candidate	Votes	%
Republican	Debra Conrad (incumbent)	19,423	54.51%
Democratic	Terri Elizabeth LeGrand	16,212	45.49%
Total votes		35,635	100%
Republican hold			

==== District 75 ====
Incumbent Republican Donny Lambeth had represented the 75th district since 2013.

North Carolina House of Representatives 75th district general election, 2018
Party	Candidate	Votes	%
Republican	Donny Lambeth (incumbent)	17,652	53.09%
Democratic	Dan Besse	15,599	46.91%
Total votes		33,251	100%
Republican hold			

==== District 76 ====
The new 76th district includes the homes of incumbent Republicans Carl Ford, who had represented the 76th District since 2013, and Harry Warren, who had represented the 77th district since 2011. Ford successfully sought election to State Senate District 33 while Warren successfully sought re-election here.

North Carolina House of Representatives 76th district general election, 2018
Party	Candidate	Votes	%
Republican	Harry Warren (incumbent)	16,718	61.25%
Democratic	Joe Fowler	10,578	38.75%
Total votes		27,296	100%
Republican hold			

==== District 77 ====
The new 77th district overlaps with much of the former 79th district. Incumbent Republican Julia Craven Howard, who had represented the 79th district and its predecessors since 1989, successfully sought re-election here.

North Carolina House of Representatives 77th district general election, 2018
Party	Candidate	Votes	%
Republican	Juila Craven Howard (incumbent)	23,654	73.37%
Democratic	Bonnie Dawn Clark	8,584	26.63%
Total votes		32,238	100%
Republican hold			

==== District 78 ====
Incumbent Republican Allen McNeill had represented the 78th district since 2012.

North Carolina House of Representatives 78th district general election, 2018
Party	Candidate	Votes	%
Republican	Allen Ray McNeill (incumbent)	20,829	78.78%
Democratic	Jim Meredith	5,612	21.22%
Total votes		26,441	100%
Republican hold			

==== District 79 ====
Following 2018 Redistricting, a new 79th district was created. The new district contains Beaufort and Craven counties and is expected to favor Republicans. Keith Kidwell won the open seat.

North Carolina House of Representatives 79th district general election, 2018
Party	Candidate	Votes	%
Republican	Keith Kidwell	17,247	60.59%
Democratic	Jerry E. Langley	11,220	39.41%
Total votes		28,647	100%
Republican win (new seat)			

=== Districts 80-99 ===
==== District 80 ====
Incumbent Republican Sam Watford, who had represented the 80th district since 2015, ran for the State Senate. He was succeeded by Republican Steve Jarvis.

North Carolina House of Representatives 80th district general election, 2018
Party	Candidate	Votes	%
Republican	Steve Jarvis	21,283	75.08%
Democratic	Wendy B. Sellars	7,063	24.92%
Total votes		28,346	100%
Republican hold			

==== District 81 ====
Incumbent Republican Larry Potts had represented the 81st district since 2017.

North Carolina House of Representatives 81st district general election, 2018
Party	Candidate	Votes	%
Republican	Larry Potts (incumbent)	20,276	71.84%
Democratic	Lewie Phillips	7,946	28.16%
Total votes		28,222	100%
Republican hold			

==== District 82 ====
The new 82nd district overlaps with much of the former 83rd district. Incumbent Republican Linda Johnson, who had represented the 83rd district and its predecessors since 2001, was re-elected here.

North Carolina House of Representatives 82nd district general election, 2018
Party	Candidate	Votes	%
Republican	Linda Johnson (incumbent)	18,969	52.75%
Democratic	Aimy Steele	16,991	47.25%
Total votes		35,960	100%
Republican hold			

==== District 83 ====
The new 83rd district overlaps with much of the former 82nd district. Incumbent Republican Larry Pittman, who had represented the 82nd district since 2011, was re-elected here.

North Carolina House of Representatives 83rd district general election, 2018
Party	Candidate	Votes	%
Republican	Larry Pittman (incumbent)	14,798	52.78%
Democratic	Gail Young	13,240	47.22%
Total votes		28,038	100%
Republican hold			

==== District 84 ====
Incumbent Republican Rena Turner had represented the 84th district since 2013.

North Carolina House of Representatives 84th district general election, 2018
Party	Candidate	Votes	%
Republican	Rena Turner (incumbent)	20,483	68.90%
Democratic	Allen R. Edwards	9,246	31.10%
Total votes		29,729	100%
Republican hold			

==== District 85 ====
Incumbent Republican Josh Dobson had represented the 85th district since 2013.

North Carolina House of Representatives 85th district general election, 2018
Party	Candidate	Votes	%
Republican	Josh Dobson (incumbent)	20,408	74.95%
Democratic	Howard Larsen	6,822	25.05%
Total votes		27,230	100%
Republican hold			

==== District 86 ====
Incumbent Republican Hugh Blackwell had represented the 86th district since 2009.

North Carolina House of Representatives 86th district general election, 2018
Party	Candidate	Votes	%
Republican	Hugh Blackwell (incumbent)	16,412	64.48%
Democratic	Tim Barnsback	9,039	35.52%
Total votes		25,451	100%
Republican hold			

==== District 87 ====
Incumbent Republican Destin Hall had represented the 87th district since 2017.

North Carolina House of Representatives 87th district general election, 2018
Party	Candidate	Votes	%
Republican	Destin Hall (incumbent)	19,031	72.86%
Democratic	Amanda Bregel	7,089	27.14%
Total votes		26,120	100%
Republican hold			

==== District 88 ====
Incumbent Democrat Mary Belk had represented the 88th district since 2017.

North Carolina House of Representatives 88th district general election, 2018
Party	Candidate	Votes	%
Democratic	Mary Belk (incumbent)	22,561	75.63%
Republican	Ty Turner	7,268	24.37%
Total votes		29,829	100%
Democratic hold			

==== District 89 ====
Incumbent Republican Mitchell Setzer had represented the 89th district and its predecessors since 1999.

North Carolina House of Representatives 89th district general election, 2018
Party	Candidate	Votes	%
Republican	Mitchell Setzer (incumbent)	18,959	72.25%
Democratic	Greg Cranford	7,281	27.75%
Total votes		26,240	100%
Republican hold			

==== District 90 ====
Incumbent Republican Sarah Stevens had represented the 90th district since 2009.

North Carolina House of Representatives 90th district general election, 2018
Party	Candidate	Votes	%
Republican	Sarah Stevens (incumbent)	18,373	68.35%
Democratic	John Worth Wiles	7,170	26.68%
Constitution	Allen Poindexter	1,336	4.97%
Total votes		26,879	100%
Republican hold			

==== District 91 ====
Incumbent Republican Kyle Hall had represented the 91st district since 2015.

North Carolina House of Representatives 91st district general election, 2018
Party	Candidate	Votes	%
Republican	Kyle Hall (incumbent)	21,232	73.24%
Democratic	Michael Booth	7,134	24.61%
Libertarian	Steve Brenneis	623	2.15%
Total votes		28,989	100%
Republican hold			

==== District 92 ====
Incumbent Democrat Chaz Beasley had represented the 92nd district since 2017.

North Carolina House of Representatives 92nd district general election, 2018
Party	Candidate	Votes	%
Democratic	Chaz Beasley (incumbent)	20,043	70.02%
Republican	Debbie Ware	8,580	29.98%
Total votes		28,623	100%
Democratic hold			

==== District 93 ====
Incumbent Republican Jonathan Jordan had represented the 93rd district since 2011. Jordan was defeated for re-election by Democrat Carl Ray Russell.

North Carolina House of Representatives 93rd district general election, 2018
Party	Candidate	Votes	%
Democratic	Carl Ray Russell	18,787	52.21%
Republican	Jonathan Jordan (incumbent)	17,196	47.79%
Total votes		35,983	100%
Democratic gain from Republican			

==== District 94 ====
Incumbent Republican Jeffrey Elmore had represented the 94th district since 2013.

North Carolina House of Representatives 94th district general election, 2018
Party	Candidate	Votes	%
Republican	Jeffrey Elmore (incumbent)	21,278	72.68%
Democratic	Dianne Little	7,998	27.32%
Total votes		29,276	100%
Republican hold			

==== District 95 ====
Incumbent Republican John Fraley had represented the 95th district since 2015.

North Carolina House of Representatives 95th district general election, 2018
Party	Candidate	Votes	%
Republican	John Fraley (incumbent)	22,593	64.07%
Democratic	Carla Fassbender	12,670	35.93%
Total votes		35,263	100%
Republican hold			

==== District 96 ====
Incumbent Republican Jay Adams had represented the 96th district since 2015.

North Carolina House of Representatives 96th district general election, 2018
Party	Candidate	Votes	%
Republican	Jay Adams (incumbent)	16,285	60.74%
Democratic	Kim Bost	10,527	39.26%
Total votes		26,812	100%
Republican hold			

==== District 97 ====
Incumbent Republican Jason Saine had represented the 97th district since 2011.

North Carolina House of Representatives 97th district general election, 2018
Party	Candidate	Votes	%
Republican	Jason Saine (incumbent)	22,122	70.51%
Democratic	Natalie Robertson	9,252	29.49%
Total votes		31,374	100%
Republican hold			

==== District 98 ====
Incumbent Republican John Bradford had represented the 98th district since 2015. Bradford was defeated for re-election by Democrat Christy Clark.

North Carolina House of Representatives 98th district general election, 2018
Party	Candidate	Votes	%
Democratic	Christy Clark	20,033	50.52%
Republican	John Bradford (incumbent)	19,618	49.48%
Total votes		39,651	100%
Democratic gain from Republican			

==== District 99 ====
Incumbent Democrat Rodney Moore had represented the 99th district since 2011. Moore lost re-nomination to fellow Democrat Nasif Majeed. Majeed won the general election.

North Carolina House of Representatives 99th district general election, 2018
Party	Candidate	Votes	%
Democratic	Nasif Majeed	21,915	82.35%
Republican	Joshua Niday	4,696	17.65%
Total votes		26,611	100%
Democratic hold			

=== Districts 100-120 ===
==== District 100 ====
Incumbent Democrat John Autry had represented the 100th district since 2017.

North Carolina House of Representatives 100th district general election, 2018
Party	Candidate	Votes	%
Democratic	John Autry (incumbent)	16,755	70.83%
Republican	Nancy Campbell	6,901	29.17%
Total votes		23,656	100%
Democratic hold			

==== District 101 ====
Incumbent Democrat Beverly Earle had represented the 101st district and its predecessors since 1995. Earl did not seek re-election. Democrat Carolyn Logan won the open seat.

North Carolina House of Representatives 101st district general election, 2018
Party	Candidate	Votes	%
Democratic	Carolyn Logan	23,335	78.69%
Republican	Steve Mauney	6,319	21.31%
Total votes		29,654	100%
Democratic hold			

==== District 102 ====
Incumbent Democrat Becky Carney had represented the 102nd district since 2003.

North Carolina House of Representatives 102nd district general election, 2018
Party	Candidate	Votes	%
Democratic	Becky Carney (incumbent)	21,609	83.35%
Republican	Tyler Norris	4,316	16.65%
Total votes		25,925	100%
Democratic hold			

==== District 103 ====
Incumbent Republican Bill Brawley had represented the 103rd district since 2011. Brawley lost re-election to Democrat Rachel Hunt.

North Carolina House of Representatives 103rd district general election, 2018
Party	Candidate	Votes	%
Democratic	Rachel Hunt	19,133	50.09%
Republican	Bill Brawley (incumbent)	19,065	49.91%
Total votes		38,198	100%
Democratic gain from Republican			

==== District 104 ====
Incumbent Republican Andy Dulin had represented the 104th district since 2017. Dulin lost re-election to Democrat Brandon Lofton.

North Carolina House of Representatives 104th district general election, 2018
Party	Candidate	Votes	%
Democratic	Brandon Lofton	21,716	51.78%
Republican	Andy Dulin (incumbent)	20,220	48.22%
Total votes		41,936	100%
Democratic gain from Republican			

==== District 105 ====
Incumbent Republican Scott Stone had represented the 105th district since 2016. Stone was defeated for re-election by Democrat Wesley Harris.

North Carolina House of Representatives 105th district general election, 2018
Party	Candidate	Votes	%
Democratic	Wesley Harris	18,362	52.29%
Republican	Scott Stone (incumbent)	16,753	47.71%
Total votes		35,115	100%
Democratic gain from Republican			

==== District 106 ====
Incumbent Democrat Carla Cunningham had represented the 106th district since 2013.

North Carolina House of Representatives 106th district general election, 2018
Party	Candidate	Votes	%
Democratic	Carla Cunningham (incumbent)	20,261	80.55%
Republican	Geovani Opry Sherow	4,892	19.45%
Total votes		25,153	100%
Democratic hold			

==== District 107 ====
Incumbent Democrat Kelly Alexander had represented the 107th District since 2009.

North Carolina House of Representatives 107th district general election, 2018
Party	Candidate	Votes	%
Democratic	Kelly Alexander (incumbent)	24,453	100%
Total votes		24,453	100%
Democratic hold			

==== District 108 ====
Incumbent Republican John Torbett had represented the 108th district since 2011.

North Carolina House of Representatives 108th district general election, 2018
Party	Candidate	Votes	%
Republican	John Torbett (incumbent)	15,654	59.71%
Democratic	Robert Kellogg	10,563	40.29%
Total votes		26,217	100%
Republican hold			

==== District 109 ====
Incumbent Republican Dana Bumgardner had represented the 109th district since 2013.

North Carolina House of Representatives 109th district general election, 2018
Party	Candidate	Votes	%
Republican	Dana Bumgardner (incumbent)	16,407	58.84%
Democratic	Susan Maxon	11,400	40.88%
Write-in		55	0.20%
Independent	Jennie Stultz (Write-In)	22	0.08%
Total votes		27,884	100%
Republican hold			

==== District 110 ====
Incumbent Republican Kelly Hastings had represented the 110th district since 2011.

North Carolina House of Representatives 110th district general election, 2018
Party	Candidate	Votes	%
Republican	Kelly Hastings (incumbent)	16,708	67.84%
Democratic	Christy McCleary	7,919	32.16%
Total votes		24,627	100%
Republican hold			

==== District 111 ====
Incumbent Republican Speaker of the House Tim Moore had represented the 111th district since 2003.

North Carolina House of Representatives 110th district general election, 2018
Party	Candidate	Votes	%
Republican	Tim Moore (incumbent)	16,511	65.41%
Democratic	David C. Brinkley	8,733	34.59%
Total votes		25,244	100%
Republican hold			

==== District 112 ====
Incumbent Republican David Rogers had represented the 112th district since 2016.

North Carolina House of Representatives 112th district general election, 2018
Party	Candidate	Votes	%
Republican	David Rogers (incumbent)	18,155	70.94%
Democratic	Gregory James Gallagher	7,436	29.06%
Total votes		25,591	100%
Republican hold			

==== District 113 ====
Incumbent Republican Cody Henson had represented the 113th district since 2017.

North Carolina House of Representatives 113th district general election, 2018
Party	Candidate	Votes	%
Republican	Cody Henson (incumbent)	22,407	57.52%
Democratic	Sam Edney	16,551	42.48%
Total votes		38,958	100%
Republican hold			

==== District 114 ====
Incumbent Democrat Susan Fisher had represented the 114th district since 2004.

North Carolina House of Representatives 114th district general election, 2018
Party	Candidate	Votes	%
Democratic	Susan Fisher (incumbent)	34,542	82.27%
Republican	Kris A. Lindstam	7,444	17.73%
Total votes		41,986	100%
Democratic hold			

==== District 115 ====
Incumbent Democrat John Ager had represented the 115th district since 2015.

North Carolina House of Representatives 115th district general election, 2018
Party	Candidate	Votes	%
Democratic	John Ager (incumbent)	23,683	58.28%
Republican	Amy Evans	16,953	41.72%
Total votes		40,636	100%
Democratic hold			

==== District 116 ====
Incumbent Democrat Brian Turner had represented the 116th district since 2015.

North Carolina House of Representatives 116th district general election, 2018
Party	Candidate	Votes	%
Democratic	Brian Turner (incumbent)	19,571	54.88%
Republican	Marilyn A. Brown	16,091	45.12%
Total votes		35,662	100%
Democratic hold			

==== District 117 ====
Incumbent Republican Chuck McGrady had represented the 117th district since 2011.

North Carolina House of Representatives 117th district general election, 2018
Party	Candidate	Votes	%
Republican	Chuck McGrady (incumbent)	20,596	60.06%
Democratic	Gayle Kemp	13,699	39.94%
Total votes		34,295	100%
Republican hold			

==== District 118 ====
Incumbent Republican Michele Presnell had represented the 118th district since 2013.

North Carolina House of Representatives 118th district general election, 2018
Party	Candidate	Votes	%
Republican	Michele Presnell (incumbent)	19,369	57.18%
Democratic	Rhonda Cole Schandevel	14,506	42.82%
Total votes		33,875	100%
Republican hold			

==== District 119 ====
Incumbent Republican Mike Clampitt had represented the 119th district since 2017. In a rematch of the 2016 election, Clampitt was defeated by Democrat Joe Sam Queen.

North Carolina House of Representatives 119th district general election, 2018
Party	Candidate	Votes	%
Democratic	Joe Sam Queen	15,662	52.33%
Republican	Mike Clampitt (incumbent)	14,270	47.67%
Total votes		29,932	100%
Democratic gain from Republican			

==== District 120 ====
Incumbent Republican Kevin Corbin had represented the 120th district since 2017.

North Carolina House of Representatives 120th district general election, 2018
Party	Candidate	Votes	%
Republican	Kevin Corbin (incumbent)	25,619	73.44%
Democratic	Aaron Martin	9,267	26.56%
Total votes		34,886	100%
Republican hold			

== See also ==
- List of North Carolina state legislatures
