= Carl Russell =

Carl Russell may refer to:

- Carl Parcher Russell (1894–1967), historian, ecologist, and administrator
- Carl Ray Russell (born 1957), member of the North Carolina General Assembly
