= Blue Ridge Music Center =

Music venue in Galax, Virginia

Coordinates: 36°34′20″N 80°51′02″W

The Blue Ridge Music Center is a music venue, museum, and visitor center on the Blue Ridge Parkway near Galax, Virginia. The center celebrates the living musical heritage of the surrounding mountains and interprets its significance within the larger landscape of American music and culture through concerts, exhibits, and programs. The site is a partnership between the National Park Service and Blue Ridge Parkway Foundation.

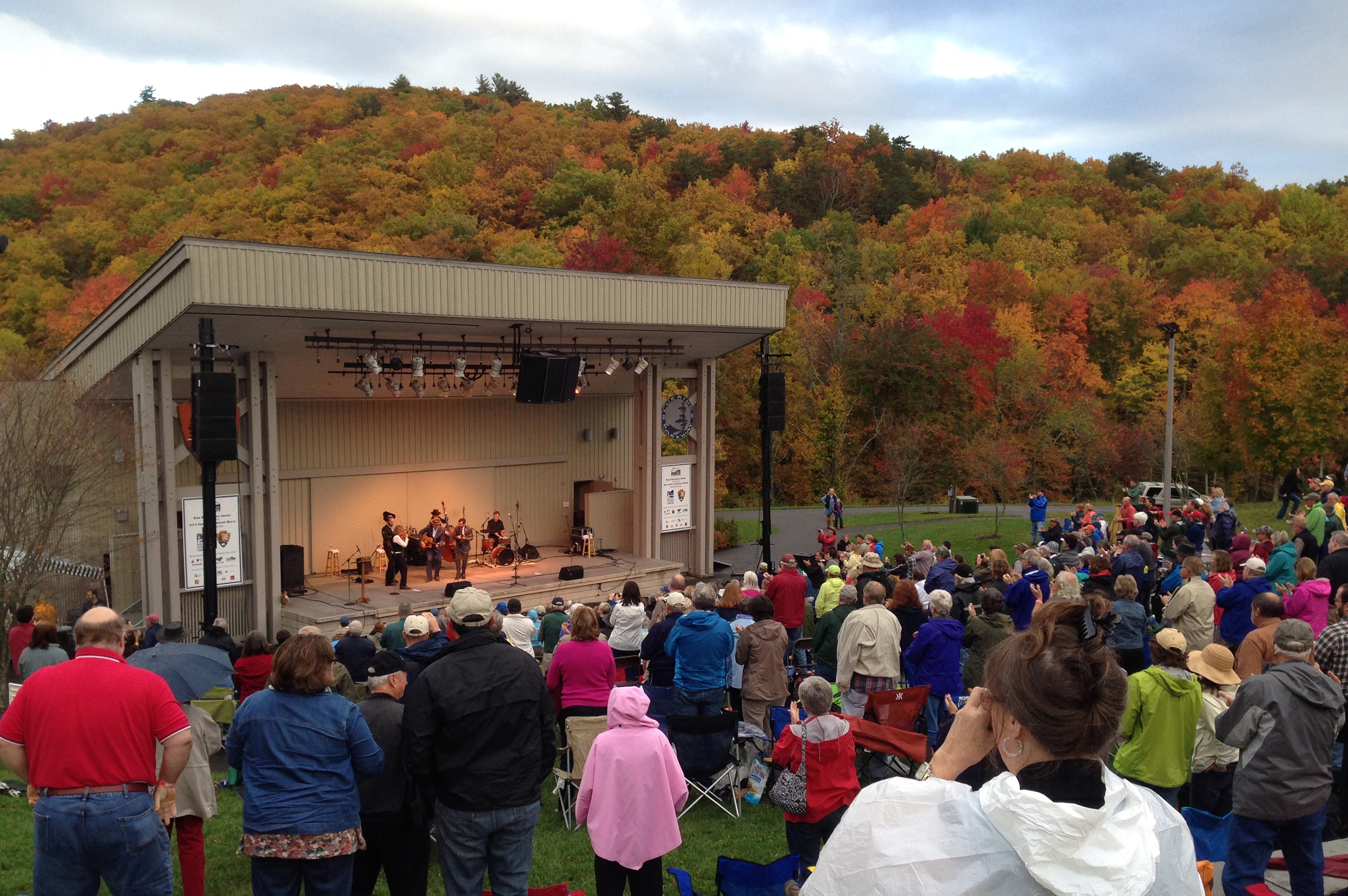
The Blue Ridge Music Center hosts concerts each summer at its outdoor amphitheater on the Blue Ridge Parkway.

== See also ==
- List of music museums

== Sources ==
- Ball, Julie (November 1, 2002). "Blue Ridge Music Center will highlight region's old-time roots". Asheville Citizen Times. p. 5 – via newspapers.com.
