= Carl Ray Russell =

American politician from North Carolina

Ray Russell
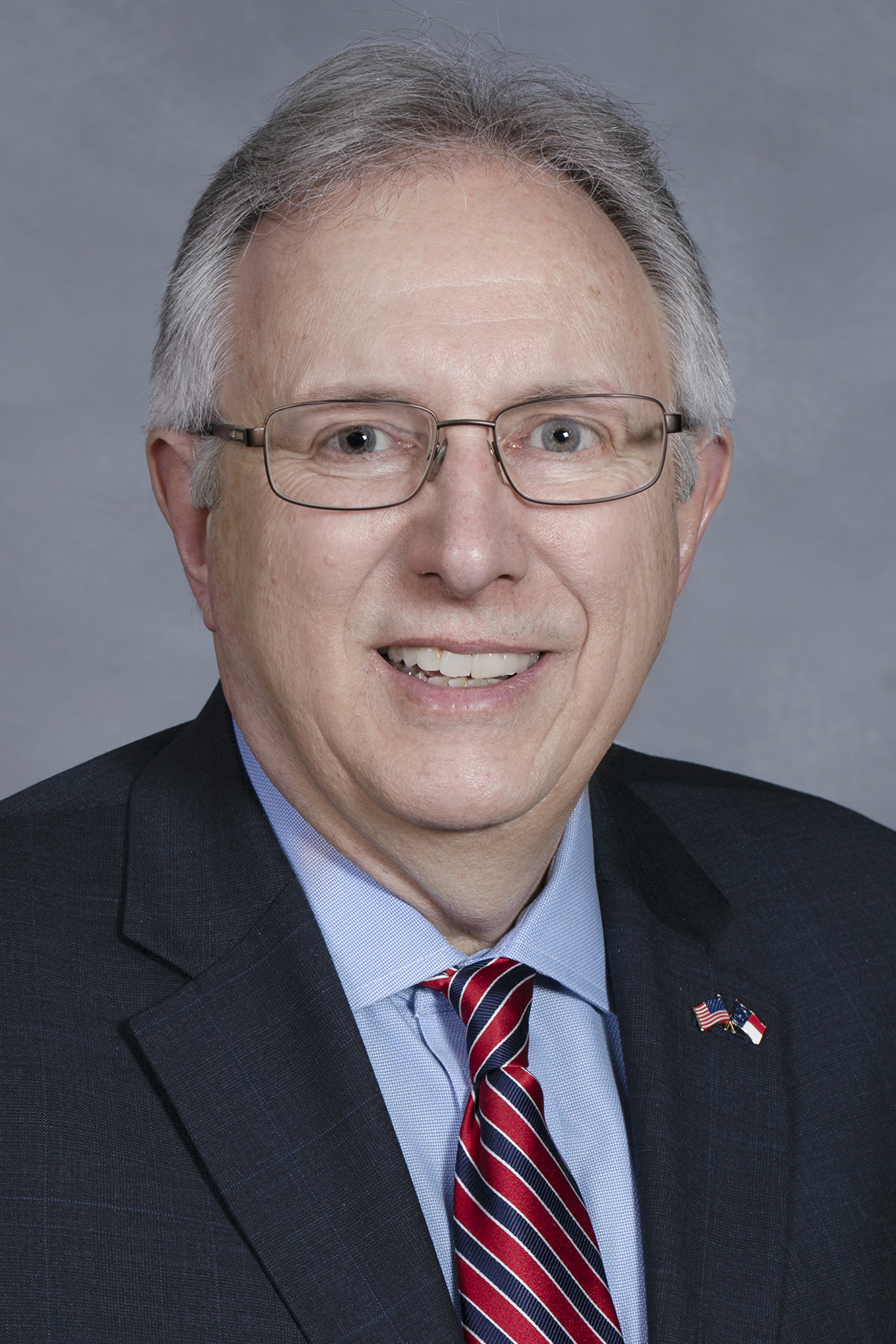

Member of the North Carolina House of Representatives from the 93rd district
- In office January 1, 2019 – January 1, 2021
- Preceded by: Jonathan Jordan
- Succeeded by: Ray Pickett

Personal details
- Born: March 22, 1957 (age 69) Manchester, Tennessee, U.S.
- Party: Democratic
- Spouse: Rhonda Russell
- Education: Freed-Hardeman University Memphis State University Georgia Institute of Technology
- Occupation: Professor
- Website: rayfornc.com

Carl "Ray" Russell (born March 22, 1957) is an American politician, professor, and self-taught meteorologist. Russell is a current member of the Watauga County commission, and former member of the North Carolina General Assembly, who represented the State's 93rd House district (comprising Ashe and Watauga counties) from 2019 until 2021. He taught at Appalachian State University from 1991 until 2021, first in the Mathematics department and later in the Computer Science department.

Self-taught in meteorology, Russell founded the popular regional weather website, Ray's Weather Center. In 2016, Russell ran the entire length of the Blue Ridge Parkway to raise money for the Blue Ridge Parkway Foundation.

== Education ==
Russell earned bachelor's degrees in computer science and religion at Freed-Hardeman College in 1979, a MS in computer science at Georgia Institute of Technology in 1985, a MS in mathematics at Memphis State University in 1982, and a Ph.D. in computer science at Georgia Institute of Technology in 1989.

== Political career ==
Russell, a Democrat, defeated incumbent Republican Jonathan Jordan on November 6th, 2018. Russell won by a margin of 52 percent to 48 percent of Jordan. In the 2020 Democratic Primary, Russell defeated challenger Turner Doolittle by a margin of 88 percent to 12 percent.

He was defeated for re-election in 2020 by Republican challenger Ray Pickett.

On October 4, 2022, Russell was appointed to the Watauga County Commission following the resignation of chairman John Welch.

== Electoral history ==
=== 2020 ===
North Carolina House of Representatives 93rd district Democratic primary election, 2020
Party	Candidate	Votes	%
Democratic	Carl Ray Russell (incumbent)	9,950	88.08%
Democratic	Turner Doolittle	1,346	11.92%
Total votes		11,296	100%

North Carolina House of Representatives 93rd district general election, 2020
Party	Candidate	Votes	%
Republican	Ray Pickett	24,680	53.01%
Democratic	Carl Ray Russell (incumbent)	21,875	46.99%
Total votes		46,555	100%
Republican gain from Democratic			

=== 2018 ===
North Carolina House of Representatives 93rd district general election, 2018
Party	Candidate	Votes	%
Democratic	Carl Ray Russell	18,787	52.21%
Republican	Jonathan Jordan (incumbent)	17,196	47.79%
Total votes		35,983	100%
Democratic gain from Republican			

North Carolina House of Representatives
Preceded by Jonathan Jordan	Member of the North Carolina House of Representatives from the 93rd district 2019-2021	Succeeded by Ray Pickett
