= Cullie Tarleton =

American politician from North Carolina

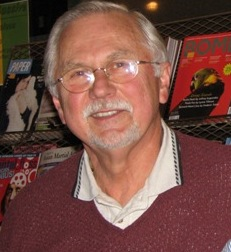
- Tarleton in 2006

Member of the North Carolina House of Representatives from the 93rd district
- In office January 1, 2007 – January 1, 2011
- Preceded by: Gene Wilson
- Succeeded by: Jonathan Jordan

Personal details
- Born: January 15, 1939 (age 87) Union County, North Carolina, U.S.
- Party: Democratic
- Spouse: Sylvia Tarleton
- Children: 3
- Occupation: Retired Broadcasting Executive
- Website: www.votetarleton.com

Cullie M. Tarleton (born January 15, 1939) is a North Carolina businessman and politician raised in Union County, North Carolina. Tarleton graduated from Marshville High School. Tarleton is married to Sylvia Davis Tarleton. He currently lives in Blowing Rock, North Carolina. Tarleton is a retired broadcasting executive and general manager for WBTV, WBT (AM), and WCCB in Charlotte, North Carolina. He is also a veteran of the North Carolina Army National Guard and United States Army Reserve (1956–64). Tarleton is also a 32nd Degree Mason.

== Political career ==
Tarleton represented the 93rd state House of Representatives district (including Ashe and Watauga counties) for two terms, from January 2007 through December 2010. A Democrat, he defeated the longtime Republican incumbent, W. Eugene Wilson, by a 13,414 to 11,069 margin, in November 2006. Tarleton had previously lost to Wilson in November 2004. He was defeated for re-election in 2010 by Republican Jonathan Jordan. After his defeat, Tarleton served on the State Lottery Commission. On February 13, 2012, Tarleton announced he would run again for the District 93 seat.

== Electoral history ==
=== 2010 ===
North Carolina House of Representatives 93rd district general election, 2010
Party	Candidate	Votes	%
Republican	Jonathan Jordan	13,528	51.46%
Democratic	Cullie Tarleton (incumbent)	12,759	48.54%
Total votes		26,287	100%
Republican gain from Democratic			

=== 2008 ===
North Carolina House of Representatives 93rd district general election, 2008
Party	Candidate	Votes	%
Democratic	Cullie Tarleton (incumbent)	20,765	51.66%
Republican	Dan Soucek	17,822	44.34%
Libertarian	Jeff Cannon	1,607	4.00%
Total votes		40,194	100%
Democratic hold			

=== 2006 ===
North Carolina House of Representatives 93rd district general election, 2006
Party	Candidate	Votes	%
Democratic	Cullie Tarleton	13,414	54.79%
Republican	Gene Wilson (incumbent)	11,069	45.21%
Total votes		24,483	100%
Democratic gain from Republican			

=== 2004 ===
North Carolina House of Representatives 93rd district Democratic primary election, 2004
Party	Candidate	Votes	%
Democratic	Cullie Tarleton	1,317	54.72%
Democratic	Dan Hense	1,090	45.28%
Total votes		2,407	100%

North Carolina House of Representatives 93rd district general election, 2004
Party	Candidate	Votes	%
Republican	Gene Wilson (incumbent)	17,953	51.85%
Democratic	Cullie Tarleton	15,595	45.04%
Libertarian	Brandon Derr	1,078	3.11%
Total votes		34,626	100%
Republican hold			

North Carolina House of Representatives
Preceded by Gene Wilson	Member of the North Carolina House of Representatives from the 93rd district 2007-2011	Succeeded by Jonathan Jordan
