= John M. Rayfield =

American politician

Member of the North Carolina House of Representatives
- In office January 1, 1995 – January 1, 2007
- Preceded by: Billy W. Joye Jr.
- Succeeded by: Wil Neumann
- Constituency: 93rd District (1995-2003); 108th District (2003-2007)

Personal details
- Born: John Melvin Rayfield; February 11, 1926 Belmont, North Carolina, U.S.
- Died: March 1, 2010 (aged 84) Gastonia, North Carolina, U.S.
- Party: Republican
- Education: Gaston College, La Salle Extension University

John Melvin Rayfield (February 11, 1926 – March 1, 2010) was a former Republican member of the North Carolina General Assembly representing the state's ninety third House district, including constituents in Gaston county. He died in 2010 at a retirement home, of heart failure.

== Electoral history ==
=== 2004 ===
North Carolina House of Representatives 108th district general election, 2004
Party	Candidate	Votes	%
Republican	John Rayfield (incumbent)	16,505	68.70%
Democratic	William F. Manning Sr.	7,519	31.30%
Total votes		24,024	100%
Republican hold			

=== 2002 ===
North Carolina House of Representatives 108th district general election, 2002
Party	Candidate	Votes	%
Republican	John Rayfield (incumbent)	12,196	84.26%
Libertarian	John Covington	2,278	15.74%
Total votes		14,474	100%
Republican hold			

=== 2000 ===
North Carolina House of Representatives 93rd district general election, 2000
Party	Candidate	Votes	%
Republican	John Rayfield (incumbent)	13,203	89.83%
Libertarian	Thomas Bishko	1,495	10.17%
Total votes		14,698	100%
Republican hold			

North Carolina House of Representatives
Preceded by Billy W. Joye Jr.	Member of the North Carolina House of Representatives from the 93rd district 1995–2003	Succeeded by Bill McGee
Preceded by Constituency established	Member of the North Carolina House of Representatives from the 108th district 2003–2007	Succeeded by Wil Neumann
