= Ray Pickett =

American politician

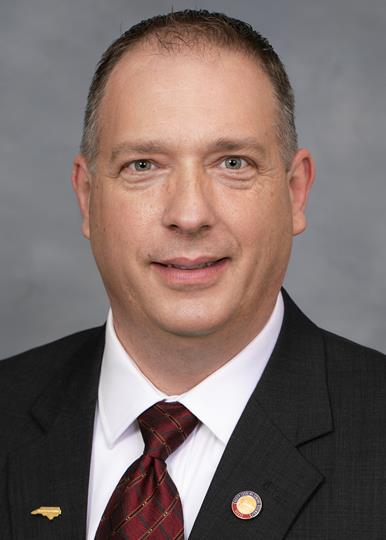

Member of the North Carolina House of Representatives from the 93rd district
- Incumbent
- Assumed office January 1, 2021
- Preceded by: Carl Ray Russell
- Succeeded by: Charlie Wallin (elect)

Personal details
- Party: Republican
- Website: www.ncleg.gov/Members/Biography/H/772

Phillip Ray Pickett, Jr. is a Republican member of the North Carolina House of Representatives representing the 93rd district (comprising Ashe and Watauga counties) since 2021. He defeated incumbent Democrat Carl Ray Russell in the 2020 election.

== Electoral history ==
North Carolina House of Representatives 93rd district general election, 2020
| Party | Candidate | Votes | % |
|---|---|---|---|
| Republican | Ray Pickett | 24,680 | 53.01% |
| Democratic | Carl Ray Russell (incumbent) | 21,875 | 46.99% |
| Total votes | | 46,555 | 100% |
| Republican gain from Democratic | | | |

== Committee assignments ==
=== 2021-2022 session ===
- Appropriations
- Appropriations: Capital
- Education: Universities - Vice Chair
- Families, Children, and Aging
- Transportation - Vice Chair

North Carolina House of Representatives
| Preceded by Carl Ray Russell | Member of the North Carolina House of Representatives from the 93rd district 2021–present | Incumbent |
