= Julie von Haefen =

American politician (born 1971)

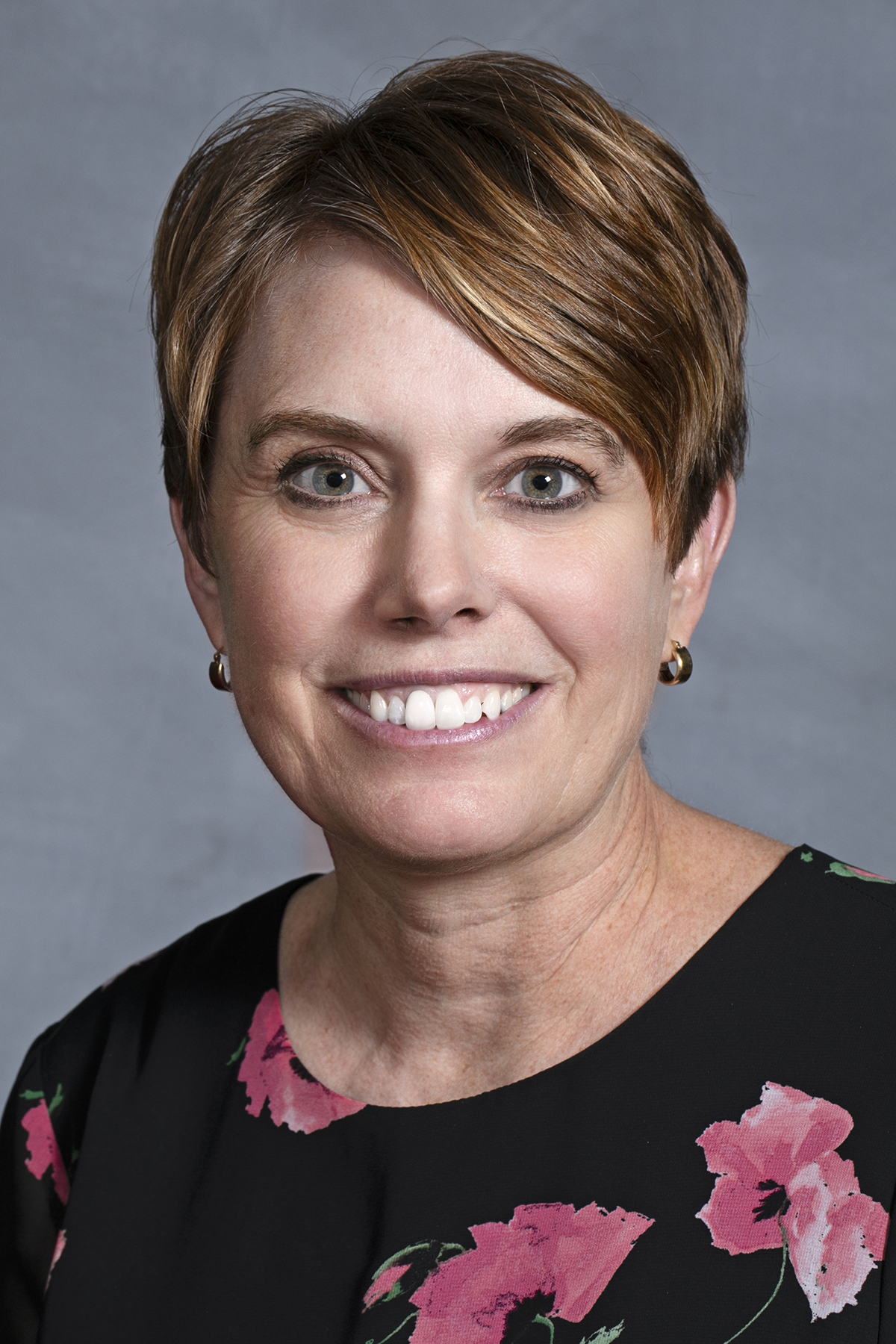

Member of the North Carolina House of Representatives from the 36th district
- Incumbent
- Assumed office January 1, 2019
- Preceded by: Nelson Dollar

Personal details
- Born: February 4, 1971 (age 55) West Chester Township, Butler County, Ohio, U.S.
- Party: Democratic
- Spouse: Roger
- Children: 3
- Education: Ohio University (BA); Case Western Reserve University (JD)
- Occupation: Attorney
- Website: Official website

Julie Marie von Haefen (born February 4, 1971) is a Democratic member of the North Carolina House of Representatives, who has represented the State's 36th district (including constituents in Southern Wake County) since 2019.

== Career ==
Haefen narrowly unseated longtime incumbent Nelson Dollar in the 2018 general election. von Haefen won with 49 percent of the vote to 48 percent for Dollar. In 2020, von Haefen defeated her Republican opponent, Kim Coley, winning 53.2 percent of the vote while Coley received 43.1 percent.

== Electoral history ==
=== 2020 ===
North Carolina House of Representatives 36th district general election, 2020
Party	Candidate	Votes	%
Democratic	Julie von Haefen (incumbent)	31,644	53.18%
Republican	Kim Coley	25,656	43.11%
Libertarian	Bruce Basson	2,206	3.71%
Total votes		59,506	100%
Democratic hold			

=== 2018 ===
North Carolina House of Representatives 36th district general election, 2018
Party	Candidate	Votes	%
Democratic	Julie von Haefen	21,551	49.52%
Republican	Nelson Dollar (incumbent)	20,667	47.49%
Libertarian	Robyn Haley Pegram	1,305	3.00%
Total votes		43,523	100%
Democratic gain from Republican			

== Controversies ==
In June 2025, Von Haefen incited controversy by posting an image on the social media site X, depicting a rallygoer at a No Kings protest holding an effigy of two heads with a bloody guillotine. Many Republicans within the state condemned the image as inciting the assassination of Donald Trump.

Others acknowledged that Rep. von Haefen was sharing a variety of footage and images from the rally, not endorsing any actual threats, and criticized the inaccuracies in reporting on the image in question. von Haefen herself said, “One of the images of a protester holding a sign was inappropriate, and I later edited the video to remove the photo. Some online sources have incorrectly reported that I am the person in the photo with the sign, which is not true. Let me be clear: I condemn political violence in all forms. My focus remains on bringing people together and fighting for the values that matter to North Carolinians.”

Von Haefen subsequently deleted the X account, which may have violated state records-keeping laws.

== Committee assignments ==
=== 2021-2022 Session ===
- Appropriations
- Appropriations - General Government
- Homeland Security, Military, and Veterans Affairs
- Local Government
- State Government

=== 2019-2020 Session ===
- Homeland Security, Military, and Veterans Affairs
- Education - Community Colleges
- Finance
- State and Local Government

North Carolina House of Representatives
Preceded by Nelson Dollar	Member of the North Carolina House of Representatives from the 36th district 2019-Present	Incumbent
