= W. Eugene Wilson =

American politician from North Carolina (1929–2015)

Gene Wilson

Member of the North Carolina House of Representatives
- In office January 1, 1995 – January 1, 2007
- Preceded by: Wade Franklin Wilmoth
- Succeeded by: Cullie Tarleton
- Constituency: 40th District (1995-2003); 82nd District (2003-2005); 93rd District (2005-2007)
- In office January 1, 1989 – January 1, 1991
- Preceded by: Wade Franklin Wilmoth
- Succeeded by: Wade Franklin Wilmoth
- Constituency: 40th District

Personal details
- Born: May 5, 1929 Boone, North Carolina, U.S.
- Died: July 31, 2015 (aged 86)
- Party: Republican
- Profession: restaurateur

William Eugene "Gene" Wilson (May 5, 1929 – July 31, 2015) was a Republican member of the North Carolina General Assembly representing the state's 93rd House district, including constituents in Ashe and Watauga counties. A retiree and restaurateur from Boone, North Carolina, Wilson served seven terms in the House of Representatives. He was defeated for re-election in November 2006 by Democrat Cullie Tarleton.

== Electoral history ==
=== 2006 ===
North Carolina House of Representatives 93rd district Republican primary election, 2006
Party	Candidate	Votes	%
Republican	Gene Wilson (incumbent)	4,401	77.40%
Republican	Dan Hense	1,285	22.60%
Total votes		5,686	100%

North Carolina House of Representatives 93rd district general election, 2006
Party	Candidate	Votes	%
Democratic	Cullie Tarleton	13,414	54.79%
Republican	Gene Wilson (incumbent)	11,069	45.21%
Total votes		24,483	100%
Democratic gain from Republican			

=== 2004 ===
North Carolina House of Representatives 93rd district general election, 2004
Party	Candidate	Votes	%
Republican	Gene Wilson (incumbent)	17,953	51.85%
Democratic	Cullie Tarleton	15,595	45.04%
Libertarian	Brandon Derr	1,078	3.11%
Total votes		34,626	100%
Republican hold			

=== 2002 ===
North Carolina House of Representatives 82nd district general election, 2002
Party	Candidate	Votes	%
Republican	Gene Wilson (incumbent)	13,989	58.33%
Democratic	Dan Hense	9,056	37.76%
Libertarian	Jeff Cannon	937	3.91%
Total votes		23,982	100%
Republican hold			

=== 2000 ===
North Carolina House of Representatives 40th district Republican primary election, 2000
Party	Candidate	Votes	%
Republican	William Hiatt (incumbent)	5,951	30.41%
Republican	Gene Wilson (incumbent)	5,317	27.17%
Republican	Rex Baker (incumbent)	4,798	24.52%
Republican	John Brady	1,928	9.85%
Republican	Larry Joseph Wood II	1,575	8.05%
Total votes		19,569	100%

North Carolina House of Representatives 40th district general election, 2000
Party	Candidate	Votes	%
Republican	William Hiatt (incumbent)	44,155	23.90%
Republican	Gene Wilson (incumbent)	42,337	22.92%
Republican	Rex Baker (incumbent)	42,110	22.79%
Democratic	Bert Wood	30,224	16.36%
Democratic	Daniel Hense	25,915	14.03%
Total votes		184,741	100%
Republican hold			
Republican hold			
Republican hold			

North Carolina House of Representatives
Preceded by Wade Franklin Wilmoth	Member of the North Carolina House of Representatives from the 40th district 1989–1991; Served alongside: David Hunter Diamont, Judy Frances Hunt	Succeeded by Wade Franklin Wilmoth
Preceded by Anderson D. Cromer; David Hunter Diamont; Wade Franklin Wilmoth	Member of the North Carolina House of Representatives from the 40th district 1995–2003; Served alongside: Rex Baker, William Hiatt	Succeeded by Rick Eddins
Preceded by Bobby Barbee	Member of the North Carolina House of Representatives from the 82nd district 2003–2005	Succeeded by Jeff Barnhart
Preceded by Bill McGee	Member of the North Carolina House of Representatives from the 93rd district 2005–2007	Succeeded by Cullie Tarleton
