= North Carolina's 93rd House district =

American legislative district

North Carolina's 93rd State House of Representatives district
Representative
Ray Pickett; R–Blowing Rock
- Demographics: 88% White; 1% Black; 7% Hispanic; 1% Asian; 2% Multiracial
- Population (2024): 88,382

North Carolina's 93rd House district is one of 120 districts in the North Carolina House of Representatives. It has been represented by Republican Ray Pickett since 2021.

== Geography ==
Since 2023, the district has included all of Alleghany and Ashe counties, as well as most of Watauga County. The district overlaps with the 47th Senate district.

== District officeholders ==
Representative	Party	Dates	Notes	Counties
District created January 1, 1993.
Billy W. Joye Jr. (Belmont)	Democratic	January 1, 1993 – January 1, 1995	Lost re-election.	1993–2003; Parts of Gaston and Mecklenburg counties.
John Rayfield (Belmont)	Republican	January 1, 1995 – January 1, 2003	Redistricted to the 108th district.	1993–2003; Parts of Gaston and Mecklenburg counties.
Bill McGee (Clemmons)	Republican	January 1, 2003 – January 1, 2005	Redistricted to the 75th district.	2003–2005; Part of Forsyth County.
Gene Wilson (Boone)	Republican	January 1, 2005 – January 1, 2007	Redistricted from the 82nd district. Lost re-election.	2005–2023; All of Ashe and Watauga counties.
Cullie Tarleton (Blowing Rock)	Democratic	January 1, 2007 – January 1, 2011	Lost re-election.	2005–2023; All of Ashe and Watauga counties.
Jonathan Jordan (West Jefferson)	Republican	January 1, 2011 – January 1, 2019	Lost re-election.	2005–2023; All of Ashe and Watauga counties.
Carl Ray Russell (Boone)	Democratic	January 1, 2019 – January 1, 2021	Lost re-election.	2005–2023; All of Ashe and Watauga counties.
Ray Pickett (Blowing Rock)	Republican	January 1, 2021 – Present		2005–2023; All of Ashe and Watauga counties.
Ray Pickett (Blowing Rock)	Republican	January 1, 2021 – Present		2023–Present; All of Alleghany and Ashe counties. Part of Watauga County.

== Election results ==
=== 2024 ===
North Carolina House of Representatives 93rd district general election, 2024
Party	Candidate	Votes	%
Republican	Ray Pickett (incumbent)	28,752	56.83%
Democratic	Ben Massey	21,841	43.17%
Total votes		50,593	100%
Republican hold			

=== 2022 ===
North Carolina House of Representatives 93rd district general election, 2022
Party	Candidate	Votes	%
Republican	Ray Pickett (incumbent)	21,613	58.40%
Democratic	Ben Massey	15,396	41.60%
Total votes		37,009	100%
Republican hold			

=== 2020 ===
North Carolina House of Representatives 93rd district Democratic primary election, 2020
Party	Candidate	Votes	%
Democratic	Carl Ray Russell (incumbent)	9,950	88.08%
Democratic	Turner Doolittle	1,346	11.92%
Total votes		11,296	100%

North Carolina House of Representatives 93rd district general election, 2020
Party	Candidate	Votes	%
Republican	Ray Pickett	24,680	53.01%
Democratic	Carl Ray Russell (incumbent)	21,875	46.99%
Total votes		46,555	100%
Republican gain from Democratic			

=== 2018 ===
North Carolina House of Representatives 93rd district Republican primary election, 2018
Party	Candidate	Votes	%
Republican	Jonathan Jordan (incumbent)	4,562	78.56%
Republican	Robert Block	1,245	21,44%
Total votes		5,807	100%

North Carolina House of Representatives 93rd district general election, 2018
Party	Candidate	Votes	%
Democratic	Carl Ray Russell	18,787	52.21%
Republican	Jonathan Jordan (incumbent)	17,196	47.79%
Total votes		35,983	100%
Democratic gain from Republican			

=== 2016 ===
North Carolina House of Representatives 93rd district Democratic primary election, 2016
Party	Candidate	Votes	%
Democratic	Sue Counts	7,188	72.69%
Democratic	Ronnie Marsh	2,700	27.31%
Total votes		9,888	100%

North Carolina House of Representatives 93rd district Republican primary election, 2016
Party	Candidate	Votes	%
Republican	Jonathan Jordan (incumbent)	7,439	73.81%
Republican	Lew Hendricks	2,640	26.19%
Total votes		10,079	100%

North Carolina House of Representatives 93rd district general election, 2016
Party	Candidate	Votes	%
Republican	Jonathan Jordan (incumbent)	21,910	53.00%
Democratic	Sue Counts	19,433	47.00%
Total votes		41,343	100%
Republican hold			

=== 2014 ===
North Carolina House of Representatives 93rd district general election, 2014
Party	Candidate	Votes	%
Republican	Jonathan Jordan (incumbent)	13,886	53.08%
Democratic	Sue Counts	12,274	46.92%
Total votes		26,160	100%
Republican hold			

=== 2012 ===
North Carolina House of Representatives 93rd district general election, 2012
Party	Candidate	Votes	%
Republican	Jonathan Jordan (incumbent)	20,003	51.52%
Democratic	Cullie Tarleton	18,820	48.48%
Total votes		38,823	100%
Republican hold			

=== 2010 ===
North Carolina House of Representatives 93rd district general election, 2010
Party	Candidate	Votes	%
Republican	Jonathan Jordan	13,528	51.46%
Democratic	Cullie Tarleton (incumbent)	12,759	48.54%
Total votes		26,287	100%
Republican gain from Democratic			

=== 2008 ===
North Carolina House of Representatives 93rd district general election, 2008
Party	Candidate	Votes	%
Democratic	Cullie Tarleton (incumbent)	20,765	51.66%
Republican	Dan Soucek	17,822	44.34%
Libertarian	Jeff Cannon	1,607	4.00%
Total votes		40,194	100%
Democratic hold			

=== 2006 ===
North Carolina House of Representatives 93rd district Republican primary election, 2006
Party	Candidate	Votes	%
Republican	Gene Wilson (incumbent)	4,401	77.40%
Republican	Dan Hense	1,285	22.60%
Total votes		5,686	100%

North Carolina House of Representatives 93rd district general election, 2006
Party	Candidate	Votes	%
Democratic	Cullie Tarleton	13,414	54.79%
Republican	Gene Wilson (incumbent)	11,069	45.21%
Total votes		24,483	100%
Democratic gain from Republican			

=== 2004 ===
North Carolina House of Representatives 93rd district Democratic primary election, 2004
Party	Candidate	Votes	%
Democratic	Cullie Tarleton	1,317	54.72%
Democratic	Dan Hense	1,090	45.28%
Total votes		2,407	100%

North Carolina House of Representatives 93rd district general election, 2004
Party	Candidate	Votes	%
Republican	Gene Wilson (incumbent)	17,953	51.85%
Democratic	Cullie Tarleton	15,595	45.04%
Libertarian	Brandon Derr	1,078	3.11%
Total votes		34,626	100%
Republican hold			

=== 2002 ===
North Carolina House of Representatives 93rd district Democratic primary election, 2002
Party	Candidate	Votes	%
Democratic	Becky Johnson	3,427	69.58%
Democratic	Tom Brandon	1,498	30.42%
Total votes		4,925	100%

North Carolina House of Representatives 93rd district Republican primary election, 2002
Party	Candidate	Votes	%
Republican	Bill McGee	3,888	55.34%
Republican	Dale Folwell	3,138	44.66%
Total votes		7,026	100%

North Carolina House of Representatives 93rd district general election, 2002
Party	Candidate	Votes	%
Republican	Bill McGee	15,591	62.74%
Democratic	Becky Johnson	8,698	35.00%
Libertarian	Kevin Fortner	562	2.26%
Total votes		24,851	100%
Republican hold			

=== 2000 ===
North Carolina House of Representatives 93rd district Republican primary election, 2000
Party	Candidate	Votes	%
Republican	John Rayfield (incumbent)	1,044	57.81%
Republican	Michael D. Summer	762	42.19%
Total votes		1,806	100%

North Carolina House of Representatives 93rd district general election, 2000
Party	Candidate	Votes	%
Republican	John Rayfield (incumbent)	13,203	89.83%
Libertarian	Thomas Bishko	1,495	10.17%
Total votes		14,698	100%
Republican hold			
