= Blue Ridge Parkway Foundation =

NPO in America

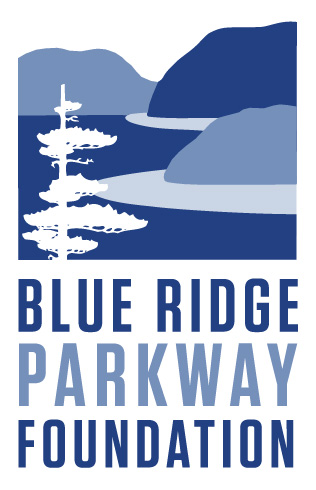
- Formation: 1997
- Headquarters: Winston-Salem, North Carolina, US
- Chief Executive Officer: Dr. Carolyn Ward
- Awards: 2022 National Scenic Byway Foundation Visitor Experience Award; 2022 Public Lands Partner Award from the Public Lands Alliance
- Website: www.brpfoundation.org

The Blue Ridge Parkway Foundation is an American nonprofit organization that raises private funding for the Blue Ridge Parkway, one of the most visited units of the National Park system. The Foundation works with the National Park Service, individuals, and organizations to address critical needs along the parkway.

== Authority ==
The Blue Ridge Parkway Foundation in Winston-Salem, North Carolina, is a nonprofit organization classified as a 501(c)(3) by the Internal Revenue Service. The Foundation was created in 1997 by Dr. Houck Medford, to raise private funding for the Blue Ridge Parkway, one of the most visited units of the National Park system. In 2022, the Blue Ridge Parkway had more 15,711,004 million visitors.

The Foundation is governed by a volunteer Board of Trustees. Each Trustee is elected by their peers and serves a three-year term. The CEO runs the day-to-day operations of the Foundation, and is a paid staff member. The current CEO is Dr. Carolyn Ward.

The Foundation is not a membership organization. Its supporters are individuals, organizations, businesses and private and family foundations as well as participants in the North Carolina State Employees Campaign and the Combined Federal Campaign. A portion of funding for the Foundation comes from sales of the North Carolina Blue Ridge Parkway specialty license plate.

All supporters receive The Scenic, a journal describing the Foundation's activities and improvement projects on the Blue Ridge Parkway. The Blue Ridge Parkway Foundation also has a free electronic newsletter.

The Foundation has additional offices in Asheville, N.C., and Galax and Lynchburg, Va.

== Purpose ==
The Foundation exists to support Blue Ridge Parkway programs and projects related to cultural and historic preservation, education and outreach, natural resource protection, and enhanced visitor amenities. The Foundation's support of Parkway programs must meet two criteria: to have a lasting value and to enhance the quality of the visitor experience.

== Priorities ==
The Foundation works with National Park Service, individuals, and organizations to address critical needs along the Blue Ridge Parkway. Parkway programs and initiatives must meet two criteria: to have a lasting value and to enhance the quality of the visitor experience.

A major initiative of the Foundation is the rehabilitation of Moses H. Cone Memorial Park, located at milepost 294 on the Blue Ridge Parkway near Blowing Rock, North Carolina. The nonprofit worked with the National Park Service to complete exterior repairs at Flat Top Manor, former home of Moses H. and Bertha Cone, and additional improvements to surrounding carriage trails at the 3,500-acre park.

Since 2013, the Blue Ridge Parkway Foundation has funded concert programming at the Blue Ridge Music Center, located at milepost 213 on the Blue Ridge Parkway near Galax, Virginia, in keeping with the nonprofit’s goal to ensure cultural and historical preservation.

The Foundation also sponsors the Kids in Parks program, along with the Blue Ridge Parkway and the Blue Cross Blue Shield of North Carolina Foundation. The program's mission is to increase physical activity of children and their families, decrease time spent using electronic devices, and engage a new generation of park stewards.

The Blue Ridge Parkway Foundation celebrated its 25th anniversary in 2022. Past projects include the restoration of the Mabry Mill waterwheel, milepost 176, the construction of restrooms at popular hiking location, Graveyard Fields, milepost 418, the rehabilitation and reopening of The Bluffs Restaurant at milepost 241, wildlife studies, and more.

The organization's 2021-2022 Annual Report is available at BRPFoundation.org.
