= Jonathan Jordan =

American politician (born 1968)

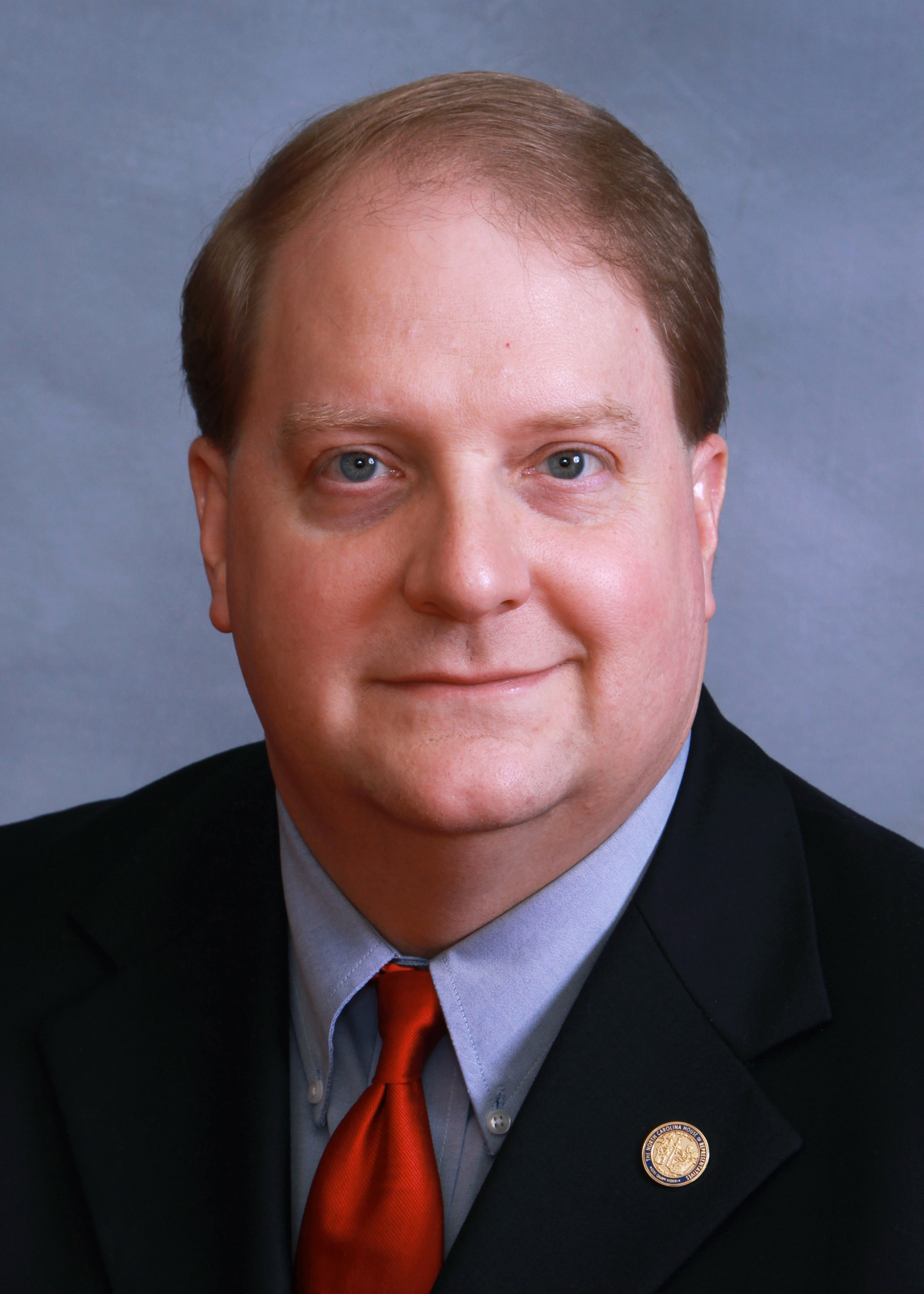

Member of the North Carolina House of Representatives from the 93rd district
- In office January 1, 2011 – January 1, 2019
- Preceded by: Cullie Tarleton
- Succeeded by: Carl Ray Russell

Personal details
- Born: May 26, 1968 (age 58)
- Party: Republican
- Education: Wake Forest University. Also attended Vanderbilt University's Owen Graduate School of Management and The University of North Carolina at Chapel Hill
- Occupation: Attorney
- Website: http://www.jordan4nchouse.com/

Jonathan C. Jordan (born May 26, 1968) is a North Carolina politician and attorney who served as the legislator for the 93rd district of the North Carolina House of Representatives from 2011 to 2019. During his first term, Jordan served as the Deputy Majority Whip of the North Carolina House of Representatives. He was elected to office in the 2010 election, defeating Cullie Tarleton by fewer than 800 votes. He defeated Tarleton again in 2012 and was reelected in 2014 and 2016, before losing in the 2018 midterm election to Watauga County Democrat Ray Russell, a professor who won with the help of students on the campus of Appalachian State University. Jordan resides in Ashe County, North Carolina, and has two children in public schools. He is an attorney by profession.

Before his election in 2010, Jordan served as the communications director for the North Carolina Republican Party and as the County Attorney for Stokes County, North Carolina. He graduated from the University of North Carolina at Chapel Hill in 1996 with a JD/MPA (Juris Doctor/Master of Public Administration), from Vanderbilt University's Owen Graduate School of Management with an MBA, and from Wake Forest University with a BA in Economics and Politics. He has served on the boards of directors of the Ashe County Chamber of Commerce, the Ashe County Home Builders Association, the Ashe County Pregnancy Care Center, and the Legal Aid of North Carolina Board.

== Endorsements ==
In 2018, Jordan was listed as a Champion of the Family in the NC Values Coalition Scorecard. In 2016, Jordan was endorsed by the State Employees' Political Action Committee (EMPAC) on its legislative endorsement page .

== Background ==
Before running for office, Jordan worked for the John Locke Foundation, a state-based conservative think tank.

== North Carolina House of Representatives ==
=== Education funding ===
The 2018 budget Jordan voted for raised teacher pay for the fifth time in 5 years. Jordan voted for the 2017 budget that added $45 million to the Opportunity Scholarship Program that provides educational improvements for low-income students and their families who are not well served by public schools. He voted for the 2015 budget that provided teachers and all state employees with a one-time $750 bonus. In 2015, NC teacher pay ranked in the bottom 10 nationally. He also voted for the 2013 budget, which did not raise teacher pay, cut education spending, and increased class sizes. This bill also included the Opportunity Scholarship Act, which provided money to students and families whose needs did not fit the one-size-fits-all government school system.

=== Medicaid expansion ===
Jordan voted against expanding Medicaid in 2013. A study found that opting out of the Medicaid expansion would cost 455 to 1,145 lives per year.

=== Environment ===
Jordan voted against a bill that passed the cost of Duke Energy's coal ash spill to its ratepayers. He voted for another bill that allowed Duke Energy to avoid cleaning up coal ash. Jordan voted against an amendment that would have protected ratepayers from having to pay to clean up coal ash. Frank Holleman, a senior attorney at the left-wing Southern Environmental Law Center, said "this coal ash bill is damning proof that the families and communities of North Carolina can't rely on state politicians to protect their drinking water supplies from Duke Energy's coal ash pollution..."

=== Electoral history ===
==== 2018 ====
North Carolina House of Representatives 93rd district Republican primary election, 2018
| Party | Candidate | Votes | % |
|---|---|---|---|
| Republican | Jonathan Jordan (incumbent) | 4,562 | 78.56% |
| Republican | Robert Block | 1,245 | 21,44% |
| Total votes | | 5,807 | 100% |

North Carolina House of Representatives 93rd district general election, 2018
| Party | Candidate | Votes | % |
|---|---|---|---|
| Democratic | Carl Ray Russell | 18,787 | 52.21% |
| Republican | Jonathan Jordan (incumbent) | 17,196 | 47.79% |
| Total votes | | 35,983 | 100% |
| Democratic gain from Republican | | | |

==== 2016 ====
North Carolina House of Representatives 93rd district Republican primary election, 2016
| Party | Candidate | Votes | % |
|---|---|---|---|
| Republican | Jonathan Jordan (incumbent) | 7,439 | 73.81% |
| Republican | Lew Hendricks | 2,640 | 26.19% |
| Total votes | | 10,079 | 100% |

North Carolina House of Representatives 93rd district general election, 2016
| Party | Candidate | Votes | % |
|---|---|---|---|
| Republican | Jonathan Jordan (incumbent) | 21,910 | 53.00% |
| Democratic | Sue Counts | 19,433 | 47.00% |
| Total votes | | 41,343 | 100% |
| Republican hold | | | |

==== 2014 ====
North Carolina House of Representatives 93rd district general election, 2014
| Party | Candidate | Votes | % |
|---|---|---|---|
| Republican | Jonathan Jordan (incumbent) | 13,886 | 53.08% |
| Democratic | Sue Counts | 12,274 | 46.92% |
| Total votes | | 26,160 | 100% |
| Republican hold | | | |

==== 2012 ====
North Carolina House of Representatives 93rd district general election, 2012
| Party | Candidate | Votes | % |
|---|---|---|---|
| Republican | Jonathan Jordan (incumbent) | 20,003 | 51.52% |
| Democratic | Cullie Tarleton | 18,820 | 48.48% |
| Total votes | | 38,823 | 100% |
| Republican hold | | | |

==== 2010 ====
North Carolina House of Representatives 93rd district general election, 2010
| Party | Candidate | Votes | % |
|---|---|---|---|
| Republican | Jonathan Jordan | 13,528 | 51.46% |
| Democratic | Cullie Tarleton (incumbent) | 12,759 | 48.54% |
| Total votes | | 26,287 | 100% |
| Republican gain from Democratic | | | |

North Carolina House of Representatives
| Preceded by Cullie Tarleton | Member of the North Carolina House of Representatives from the 93rd district 2011-2019 | Succeeded by Carl Ray Russell |
