= Nelson Dollar =

American politician

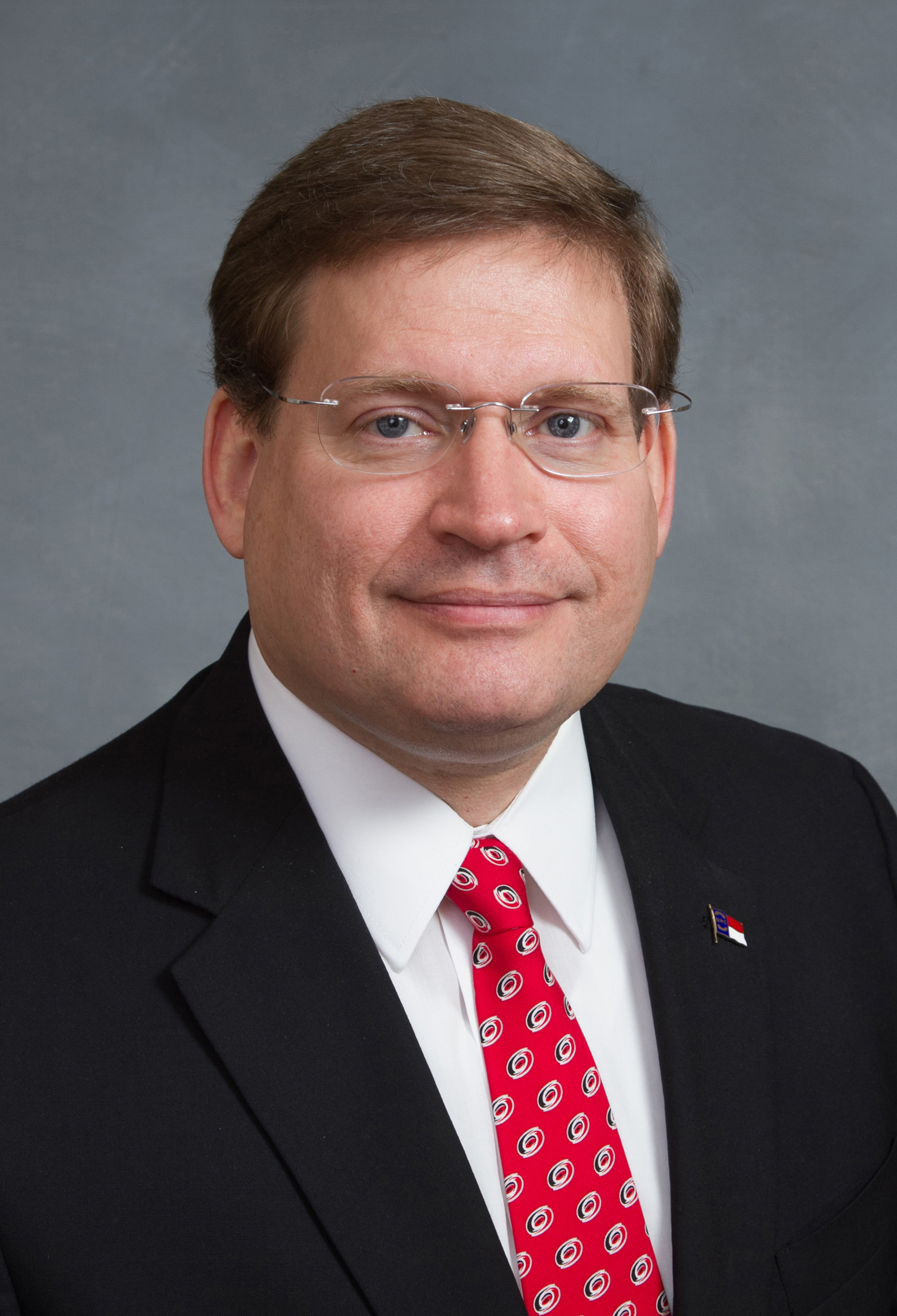

Member of the North Carolina House of Representatives from the 36th district
- In office January 1, 2005 – January 1, 2019
- Preceded by: David Miner
- Succeeded by: Julie von Haefen

Personal details
- Born: June 5, 1961 (age 65) Burlington, North Carolina
- Party: Republican
- Education: Appalachian State University
- Occupation: media consultant

Joseph Nelson Dollar (born June 5, 1961) is a former Republican member of the North Carolina General Assembly representing the State's 36th House district. The district includes constituents from the towns of Cary, Apex and Swift Creek in Wake county. In 2006 WRAL reported on Rep. Dollar's first reelection campaign.

A media and public relations consultant, Dollar has been active with the Boy Scouts, C.L.U.B. Ministries, and Camp Oak Hill. Dollar served as a Presidential Elector in 1996.

== Healthcare ==
Nelson Dollar voted not to expand Medicaid with a procedural vote in 2018. In 2013, Dollar voted for a tax reform bill that eliminated some special tax credits while lowering tax rates.

== Education ==
Dollar voted to pass the 2016 budget, which raised teacher pay by 4.7%. Dollar also voted to spend $388 million annually to reduce public school class sizes. By passing the 2017 budget, Dollar voted to reduce income and corporate tax rates, increase educator salaries, and provide funds to attract new jobs to North Carolina.

Party political offices
Preceded by Richard D. Levy	Republican nominee for North Carolina Commissioner of Labor; 1992	Succeeded by R. Tracy Walker
North Carolina House of Representatives
Preceded by David Miner	Member of the North Carolina House of Representatives from the 36th district 2005-2019	Succeeded by Julie von Haefen
