= John Torbett =

American politician

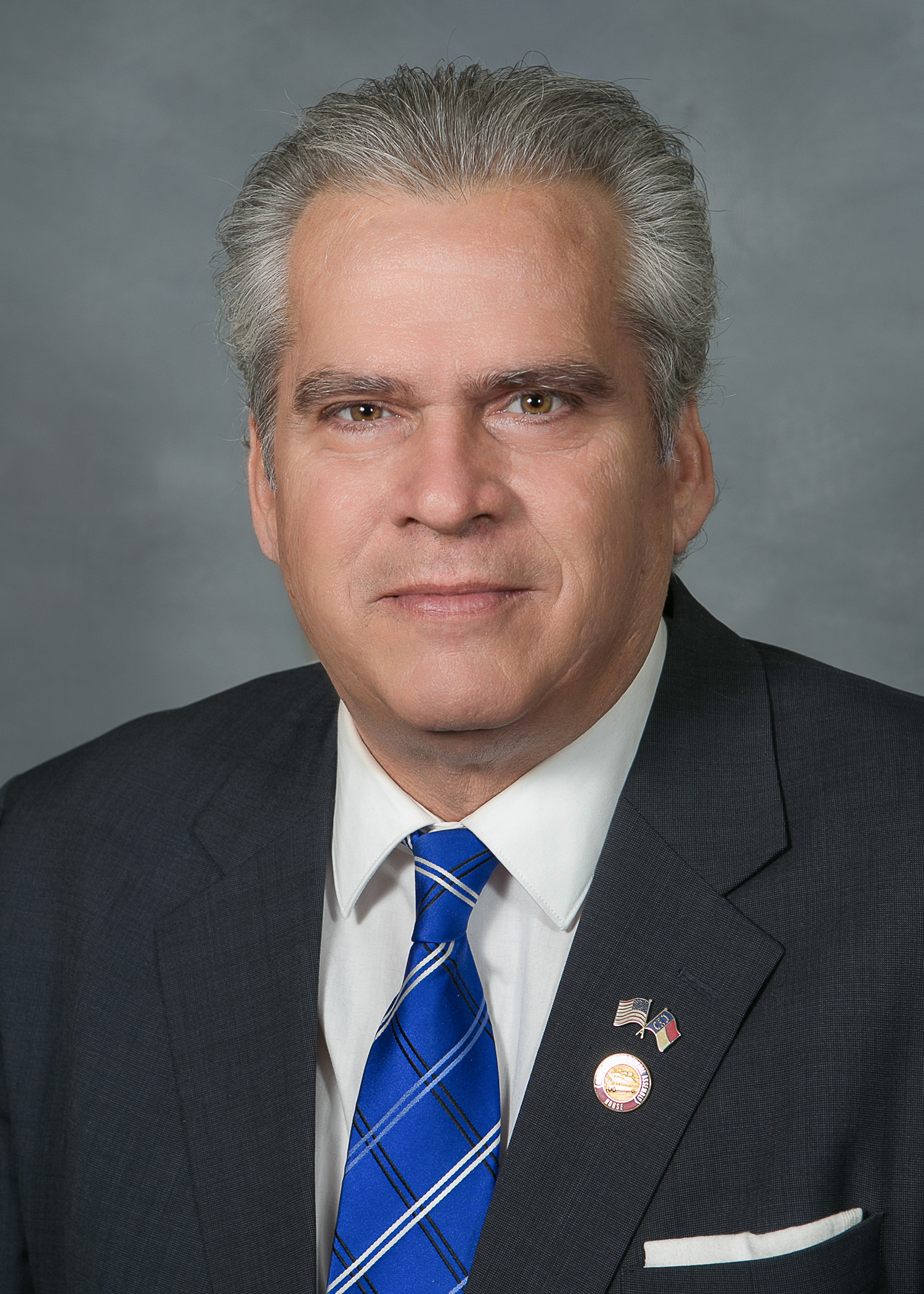

Member of the North Carolina House of Representatives from the 108th district
- Incumbent
- Assumed office January 1, 2011
- Preceded by: Wil Neumann

Personal details
- Born: John Alan Torbett; May 21, 1956 (age 70) Chattanooga, Tennessee, U.S.
- Party: Republican
- Children: 1

John Alan Torbett (born May 21, 1956) is a Republican member of the North Carolina House of Representatives. He has represented the 108th district (including constituents in Gaston County) since 2011.

== Political career ==
Torbett served on the Gaston County Board of Commissioners from 2002 to 2010. He was first elected to the NC House in 2010. He has been re-elected to the seat which covers northeastern Gaston County a total of 5 times, most recently in 2020. On March 3, 2017, Torbett filed a bill H249 entitled Economic Terrorism which would make the civil protest method of boycott a felony and entitle the target to recover $50,000 or triple damages, whichever is greater.

=== Ethics complaint in 2020 ===
In October 2020, Representative Torbett was the target of an ethics complaint and was accused of embezzling money related to financial reimbursements. Representative Torbett was not found to have committed an ethics violation or broken any laws. Accusations centered on the financial implications for over $85,000 in housing and travel expenses that Torbett had submitted since 2017. The complaint involved funds from the state for housing and travel expenses and the rules for reimbursing expenses from campaign funds.

== Electoral history ==
=== 2020 ===
North Carolina House of Representatives 108th district general election, 2020
Party	Candidate	Votes	%
Republican	John Torbett (incumbent)	24,960	63.17%
Democratic	Daniel Caudill	14,555	36.83%
Total votes		39,515	100%
Republican hold			

=== 2018 ===
North Carolina House of Representatives 108th district general election, 2018
Party	Candidate	Votes	%
Republican	John Torbett (incumbent)	15,654	59.71%
Democratic	Robert Kellogg	10,563	40.29%
Total votes		26,217	100%
Republican hold			

=== 2016 ===
North Carolina House of Representatives 108th district general election, 2016
Party	Candidate	Votes	%
Republican	John Torbett (incumbent)	24,636	100%
Total votes		24,636	100%
Republican hold			

=== 2014 ===
North Carolina House of Representatives 108th district general election, 2014
Party	Candidate	Votes	%
Republican	John Torbett (incumbent)	13,766	100%
Total votes		13,766	100%
Republican hold			

=== 2012 ===
North Carolina House of Representatives 108th district general election, 2012
Party	Candidate	Votes	%
Republican	John Torbett (incumbent)	21,933	100%
Total votes		21,933	100%
Republican hold			

=== 2010 ===
North Carolina House of Representatives 108th district general election, 2010
Party	Candidate	Votes	%
Republican	John Torbett	15,034	100%
Total votes		15,034	100%
Republican hold			

== Committee assignments ==
=== 2021-2022 session ===
- Appropriations (Vice Chair)
- Appropriations - Education (Chair)
- Education - K-12 (Chair)
- State Government (Chair)
- Redistricting (Vice Chair)
- Rules, Calendar, and Operations of the House (Vice Chair)
- UNC BOG Nominations

=== 2019-2020 session ===
- Appropriations (Vice Chair)
- Appropriations - Transportation (Chair)
- Homelessness, Foster Care, and Dependency (Chair)
- Rules, Calendar, and Operations of the House Committee (Vice Chair)
- Transportation (Senior Chair)
- Redistricting (Vice Chair)
- Judiciary

=== 2017-2018 session ===
- Appropriations (Vice Chair)
- Appropriations - Transportation (Chair)
- Appropriations - Information Technology
- Transportation (Chair)
- Rules, Calendar, and Operations of the House (Vice Chair)
- Judiciary IV
- Commerce and Job Development

=== 2015-2016 session ===
- Appropriations (Vice Chair)
- Appropriations - Transportation (Chair)
- Appropriations - Information Technology
- Transportation (Chair)
- Rules, Calendar, and Operations of the House (Vice Chair)
- Judiciary IV
- Commerce and Job Development
- Elections

=== 2013-2014 session ===
- Appropriations (Vice Chair)
- Commerce and Job Development (Vice Chair)
- Transportation
- Rules, Calendar, and Operations of the House
- Education
- Homeland Security, Military, and Veterans Affairs

=== 2011-2012 session ===
- Appropriations
- Homeland Security, Military, and Veterans Affairs (Vice Chair)
- Commerce and Job Development
- Education
- Agriculture

North Carolina House of Representatives
Preceded by Wil Neumann	Member of the North Carolina House of Representatives from the 108th district 2011-Present	Incumbent
