= Carl Parcher Russell =

American historian

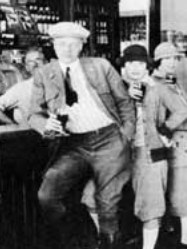
- Carl and Betty Russell, 1925

Carl Parcher Russell (January 18, 1894 – June 19, 1967) was a historian, ecologist, and administrator.

Russell was born January 18, 1894, in Fall River, Wisconsin. He joined the National Park Service (NPS) in 1923 as a Naturalist in Yosemite National Park. In 1931 he received a Ph.D. in Ecology from the University of Michigan. He served as an officer for the NPS for 34 years, from 1923 until his retirement in 1957. He was the Chief Naturalist of Yosemite from 1923 to 1929. He specialized in frontier history, studying its material culture in minute detail, and documented pioneer life for the NPS and others.

Russell served in several regional positions in the NPS, including NPS Chief Naturalist of Yosemite (1923–1929), regional director, and Yosemite National Park Superintendent. Russell retired from the park service in 1957, and he died at his home in Orinda, California, on June 19, 1967, after a heart attack.

== Books by Carl P. Russell ==
- One Hundred Years in Yosemite (1931, 1947, 1957)
- Guns on the Early Frontiers (1957)
- Firearms, Traps and Tools of the Mountain Men (posthumously, 1967) ISBN 0-8263-0465-6
- Besides books, Russell wrote several articles for Yosemite Nature Notes and NPS and historical journals, and papers for various conferences.

== Online article by Carl P. Russell ==
- "Early Years in Yosemite," California Historical Society Quarterly 5:4 (December 1926)
