= 2018 North Carolina elections =

- November 6, 2018

A general election was held in the U.S. state of North Carolina on November 6, 2018.

== Ballot Measures ==
=== Voter ID Amendment ===
Voter ID Amendment
- November 6, 2018
- Require Photo ID To Vote

Results
| Choice | Votes | % |
|---|---|---|
| Yes | 2,049,121 | 55.49% |
| No | 1,643,983 | 44.51% |
| Total votes | 3,693,104 | 100.00% |
- Yes: 50–60% 60–70% 70–80% 80–90% No: 50–60% 70–80%

2018 North Carolina Voter ID Amendment was a legislatively referred constitutional amendment that appeared on the ballot on November 6, 2018. The amendment was ratified by voters with 55% of the vote, it amended Sections 2 and 3 of Article VI of the North Carolina Constitution, to establish a constitutional requirement for photographic identification for voting. The amendment didn't go into effect due to legal challenges, however in 2023, the North Carolina Supreme Court reversed its decision in Holmes v. Moore, allowing the voter ID amendment to take effect.
