= Graveyard Fields =

Valley in North Carolina, United States

- Valley
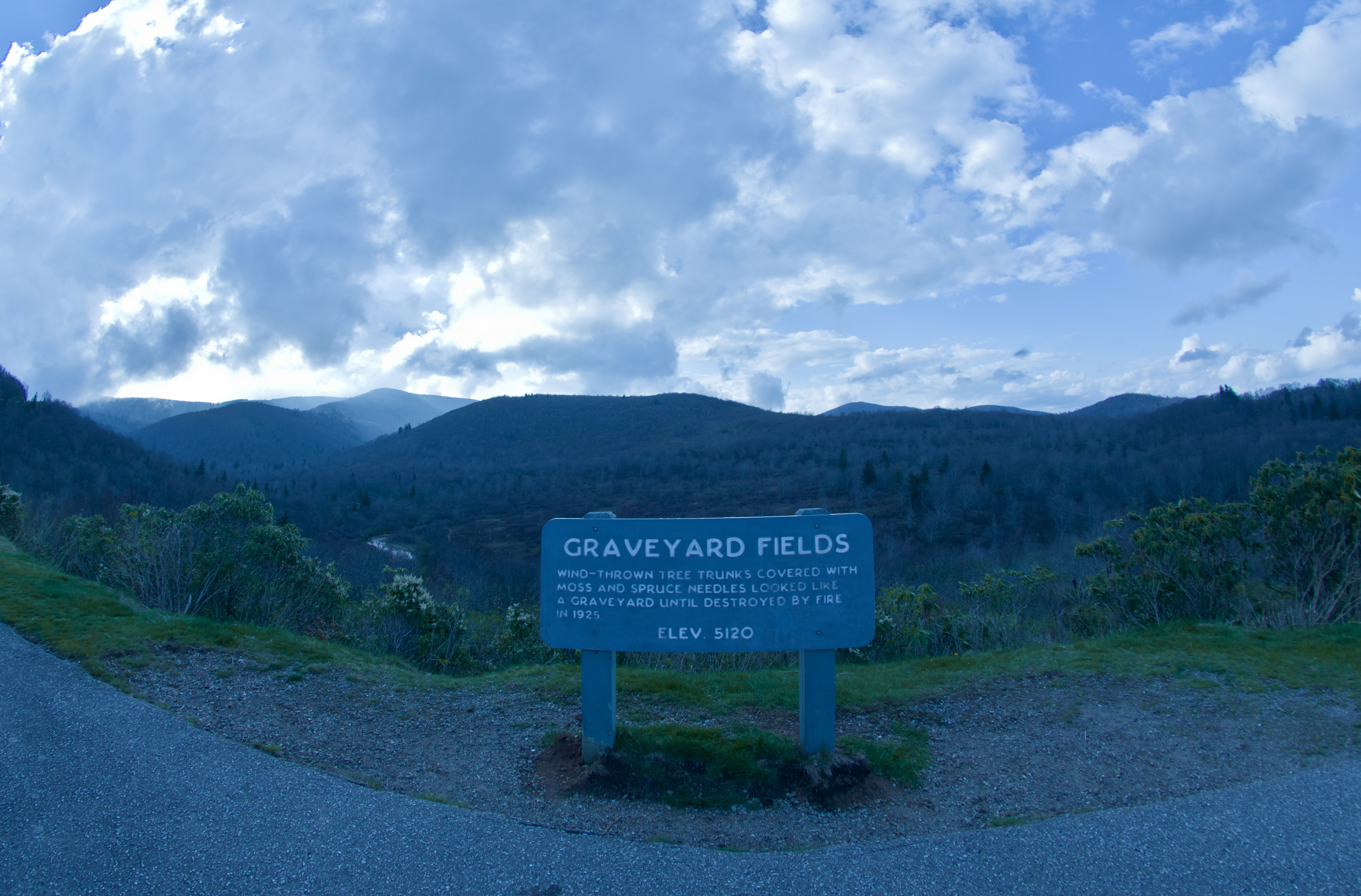
- View NW from the parking area off the Blue Ridge Parkway.
- Interactive map of Graveyard Fields
- Coordinates: 35.32147°N 82.84949°W
- Location: Pisgah National Forest, Transylvania County, North Carolina
- Elevation: 1,530 m (5,020 ft)
- Topo map: Shining Rock, NC

Graveyard Fields is the name of a flat mountain valley in the Blue Ridge Mountains of western North Carolina. It is located in the Great Balsam Mountains. The valley, itself over 5,000 feet in elevation, is surrounded by mountains exceeding 6,000 feet in elevation, such as Black Balsam Knob, Tennent Mountain, and Sam Knob. These high peaks form the source of the Yellowstone Prong of the Pigeon River, which flows through Graveyard Fields valley. Yellowstone Prong goes over 3 waterfalls in the valley: Upper Falls, Second Falls, and Yellowstone Falls. Graveyard Fields is a very popular hiking destination, accessible from the Blue Ridge Parkway.

The valley's name may originate from a time when a great windstorm fell hundreds of spruce and fir trees on its slopes. These moss-covered stumps resembled graves. Another theory says that extensive logging during the early 1900s left stumps behind. Mosses and lichens grew on the stumps, resembling an overgrown graveyard.

Later, during the time when this area was logged, major forest fires swept through the area. These fires devastated the entire valley, and heated the soil enough to sterilize it. Even now, plants have difficulty growing in the fire-ravaged soils, although some trees, shrubs, and grasslands are slowly beginning to thrive.

Today, some forest has started to regrow, with species such as Red Spruce and Catawba Rhododendron, however much of the valley is still open and only covered in shrubs.

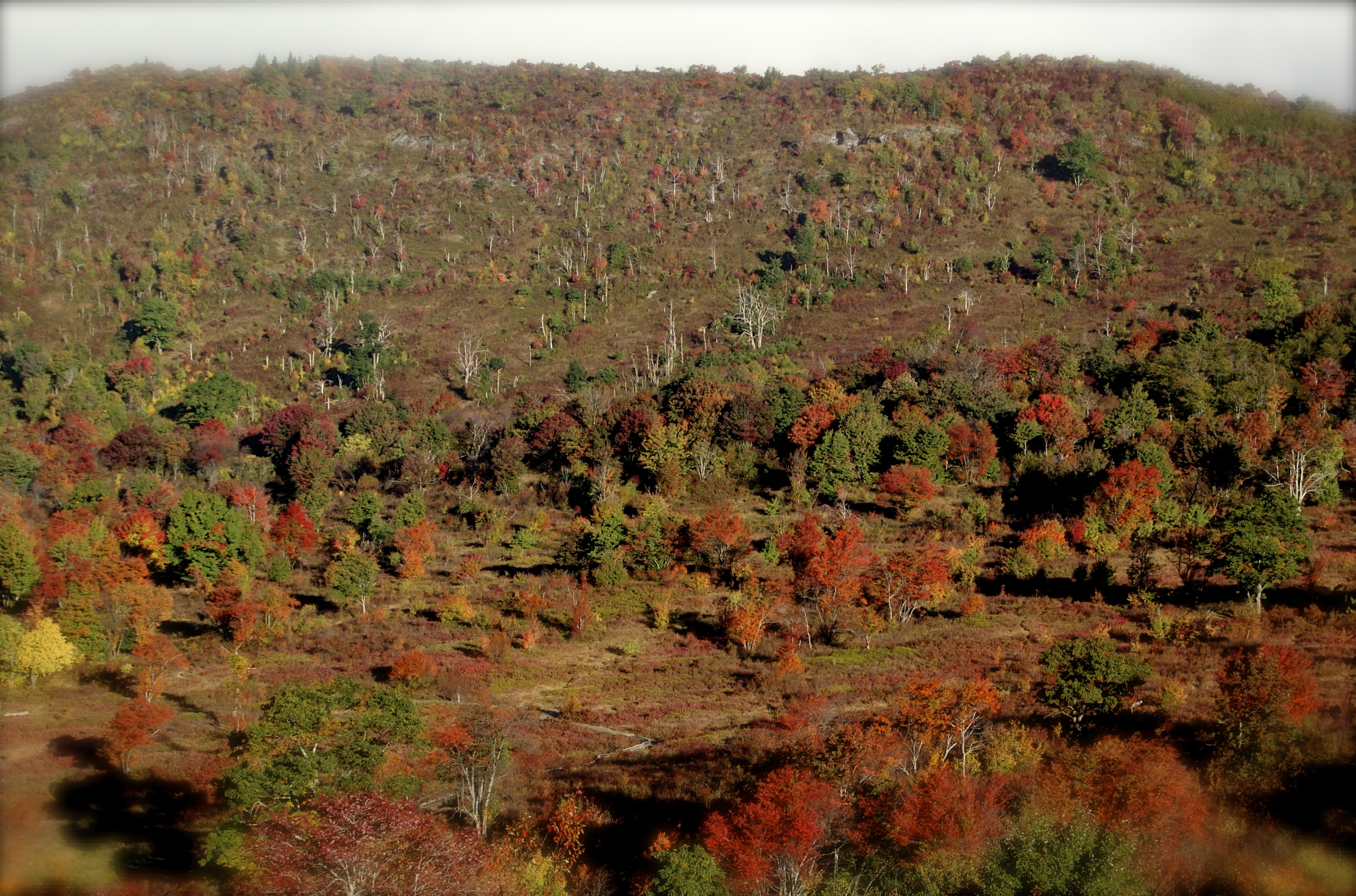
Graveyard Fields in Autumn

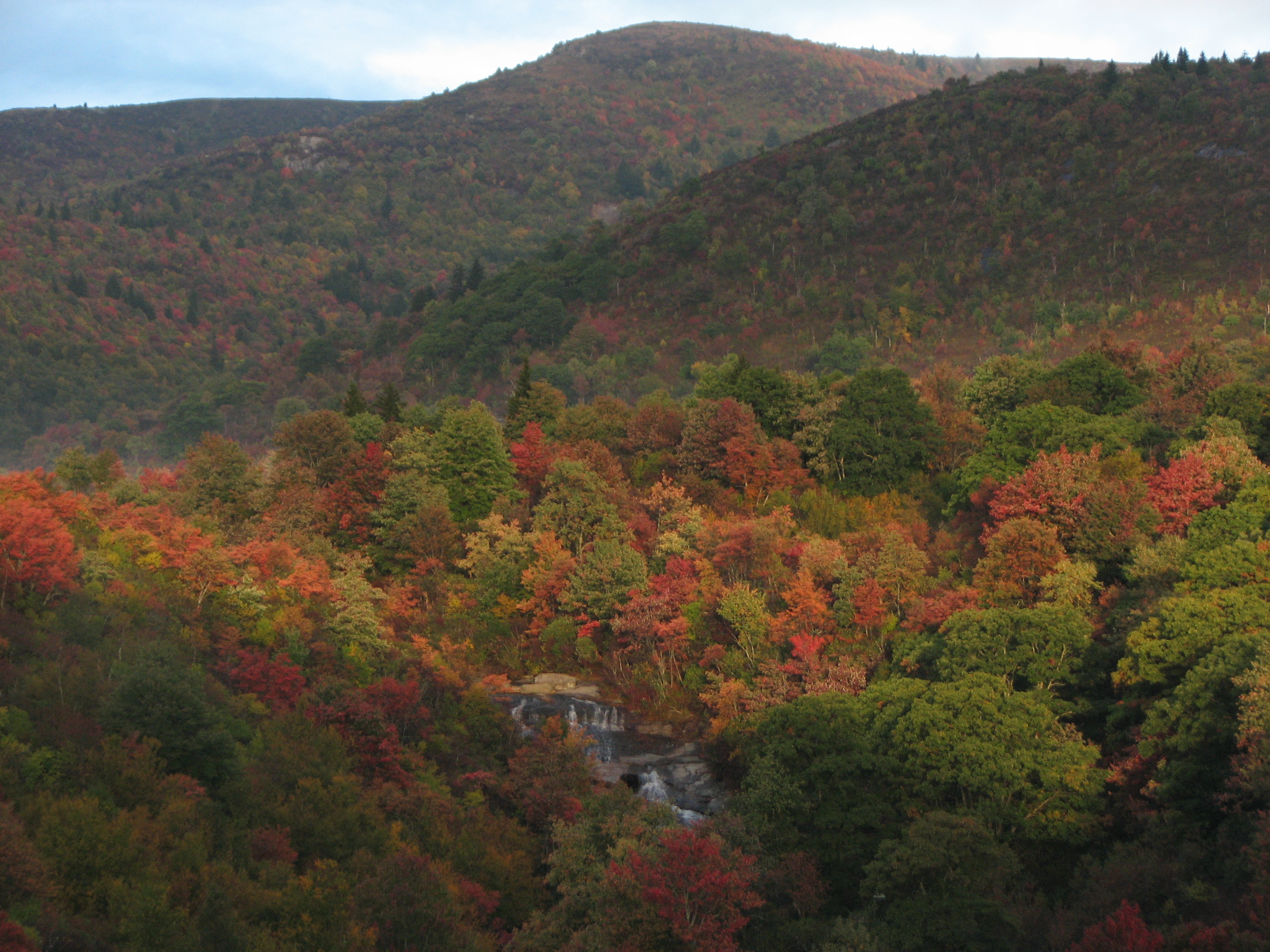
Second Falls with Black Balsam Knob in the background

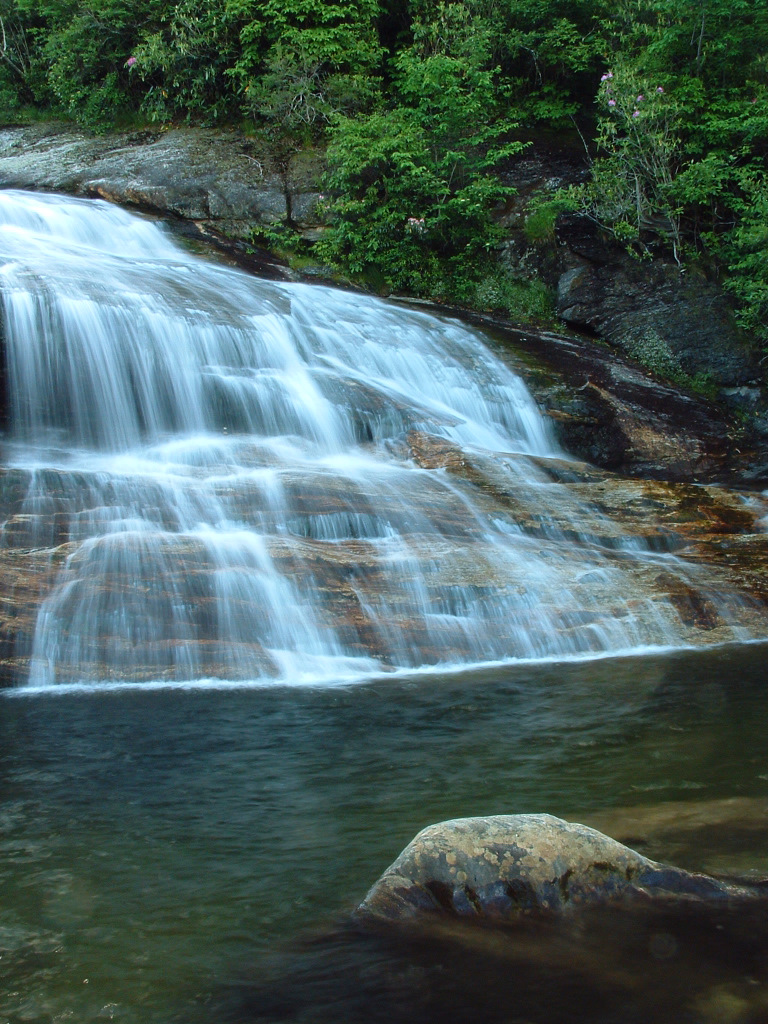
Second Falls

== Cited references ==
- N.C. Div. of Parks & Recreation
- Blue Ridge National Heritage Area
