= North Carolina's 108th House district =

American legislative district

North Carolina's 108th State House of Representatives district
Representative
John Torbett; R–Stanley
- Demographics: 67% White; 17% Black; 9% Hispanic; 2% Asian; 1% Other; 5% Multiracial
- Population (2024): 93,120

North Carolina's 108th House district is one of 120 districts in the North Carolina House of Representatives. It has been represented by Republican John Torbett since 2011.

== Geography ==
Since 2003, the district has included part of Gaston County. The district overlaps with the 43rd Senate district.

== District officeholders since 2003 ==
Representative	Party	Dates	Notes	Counties
District created January 1, 2003.				2003–Present; Part of Gaston County.
John Rayfield (Belmont)	Republican	January 1, 2003 – January 1, 2007	Redistricted from the 93rd district. Retired.	2003–Present; Part of Gaston County.
Wil Neumann (Belmont)	Republican	January 1, 2007 – January 1, 2011	Retired to run for State Senate.	2003–Present; Part of Gaston County.
John Torbett (Stanley)	Republican	January 1, 2011 – Present		2003–Present; Part of Gaston County.

== Election results ==
=== 2024 ===
North Carolina House of Representatives 108th district general election, 2024
Party	Candidate	Votes	%
Republican	John Torbett (incumbent)	28,982	64.59%
Democratic	Sydnie Hutchinson	15,892	35.41%
Total votes		44,874	100%
Republican hold			

=== 2022 ===
North Carolina House of Representatives 108th district general election, 2022
Party	Candidate	Votes	%
Republican	John Torbett (incumbent)	19,759	100%
Total votes		19,759	100%
Republican hold			

=== 2020 ===
North Carolina House of Representatives 108th district general election, 2020
Party	Candidate	Votes	%
Republican	John Torbett (incumbent)	24,960	63.17%
Democratic	Daniel Caudill	14,555	36.83%
Total votes		39,515	100%
Republican hold			

=== 2018 ===
North Carolina House of Representatives 108th district general election, 2018
Party	Candidate	Votes	%
Republican	John Torbett (incumbent)	15,654	59.71%
Democratic	Robert Kellogg	10,563	40.29%
Total votes		26,217	100%
Republican hold			

=== 2016 ===
North Carolina House of Representatives 108th district general election, 2016
Party	Candidate	Votes	%
Republican	John Torbett (incumbent)	24,636	100%
Total votes		24,636	100%
Republican hold			

=== 2014 ===
North Carolina House of Representatives 108th district general election, 2014
Party	Candidate	Votes	%
Republican	John Torbett (incumbent)	13,766	100%
Total votes		13,766	100%
Republican hold			

=== 2012 ===
North Carolina House of Representatives 108th district general election, 2012
Party	Candidate	Votes	%
Republican	John Torbett (incumbent)	21,933	100%
Total votes		21,933	100%
Republican hold			

=== 2010 ===
North Carolina House of Representatives 108th district general election, 2010
Party	Candidate	Votes	%
Republican	John Torbett	15,034	100%
Total votes		15,034	100%
Republican hold			

=== 2008 ===
North Carolina House of Representatives 108th district general election, 2008
Party	Candidate	Votes	%
Republican	Wil Neumann (incumbent)	18,931	57.67%
Democratic	Marvin "Eddie" Wyatt	12,848	39.14%
Libertarian	Keith Calvelli	1,045	3.18%
Total votes		32,824	100%
Republican hold			

=== 2006 ===
North Carolina House of Representatives 108th district general election, 2006
Party	Candidate	Votes	%
Republican	Wil Neumann	8,653	59.02%
Democratic	Marvin E. "Eddie" Wyatt Jr.	6,009	40.98%
Total votes		14,662	100%
Republican hold			

=== 2004 ===
North Carolina House of Representatives 108th district general election, 2004
Party	Candidate	Votes	%
Republican	John Rayfield (incumbent)	16,505	68.70%
Democratic	William F. Manning Sr.	7,519	31.30%
Total votes		24,024	100%
Republican hold			

=== 2002 ===
North Carolina House of Representatives 108th district general election, 2002
Party	Candidate	Votes	%
Republican	John Rayfield (incumbent)	12,196	84.26%
Libertarian	John Covington	2,278	15.74%
Total votes		14,474	100%
Republican hold			
