= 2012 North Carolina House of Representatives election =

- November 6, 2012

All 120 seats in the North Carolina House of Representatives 61 seats needed for a majority
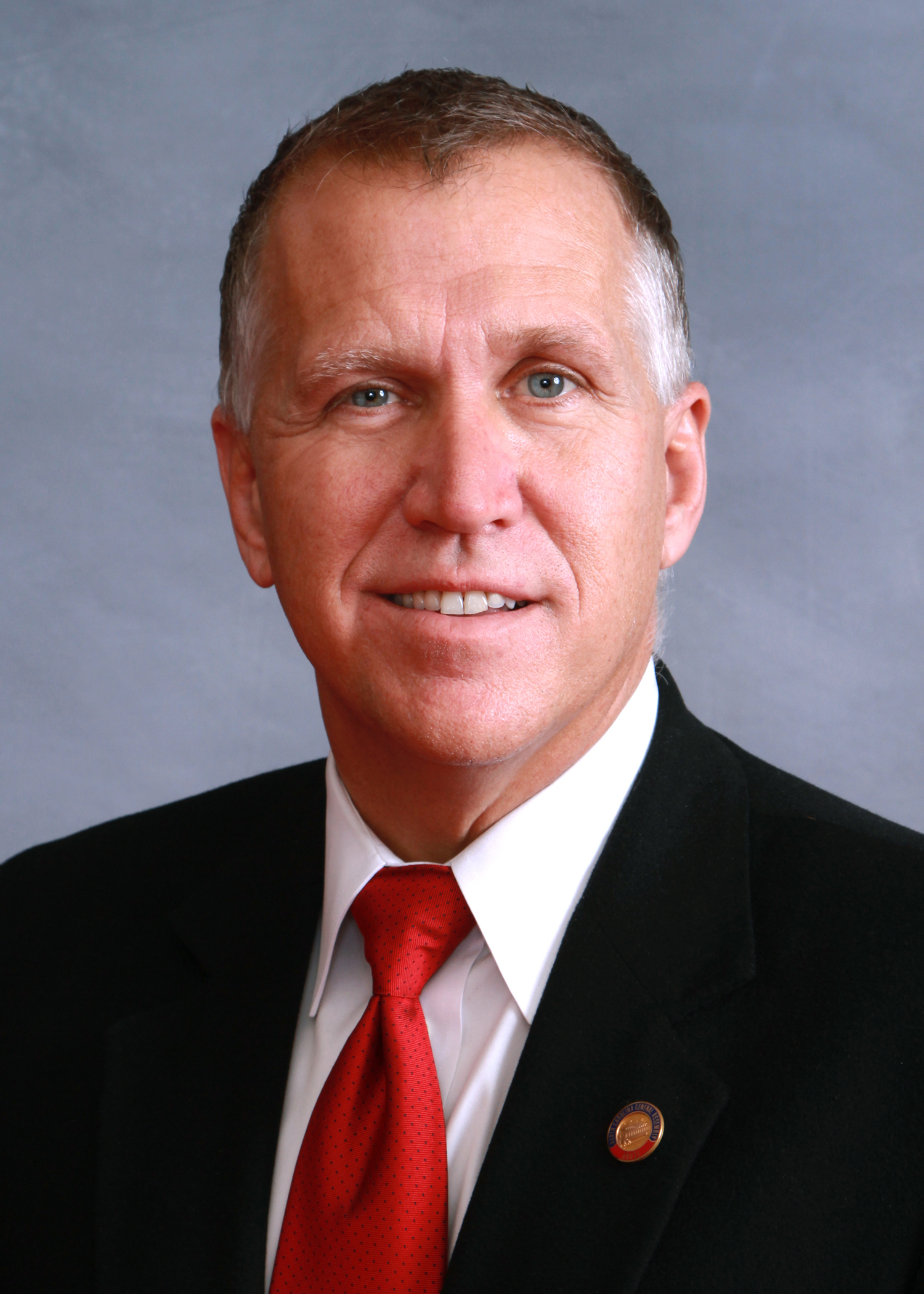

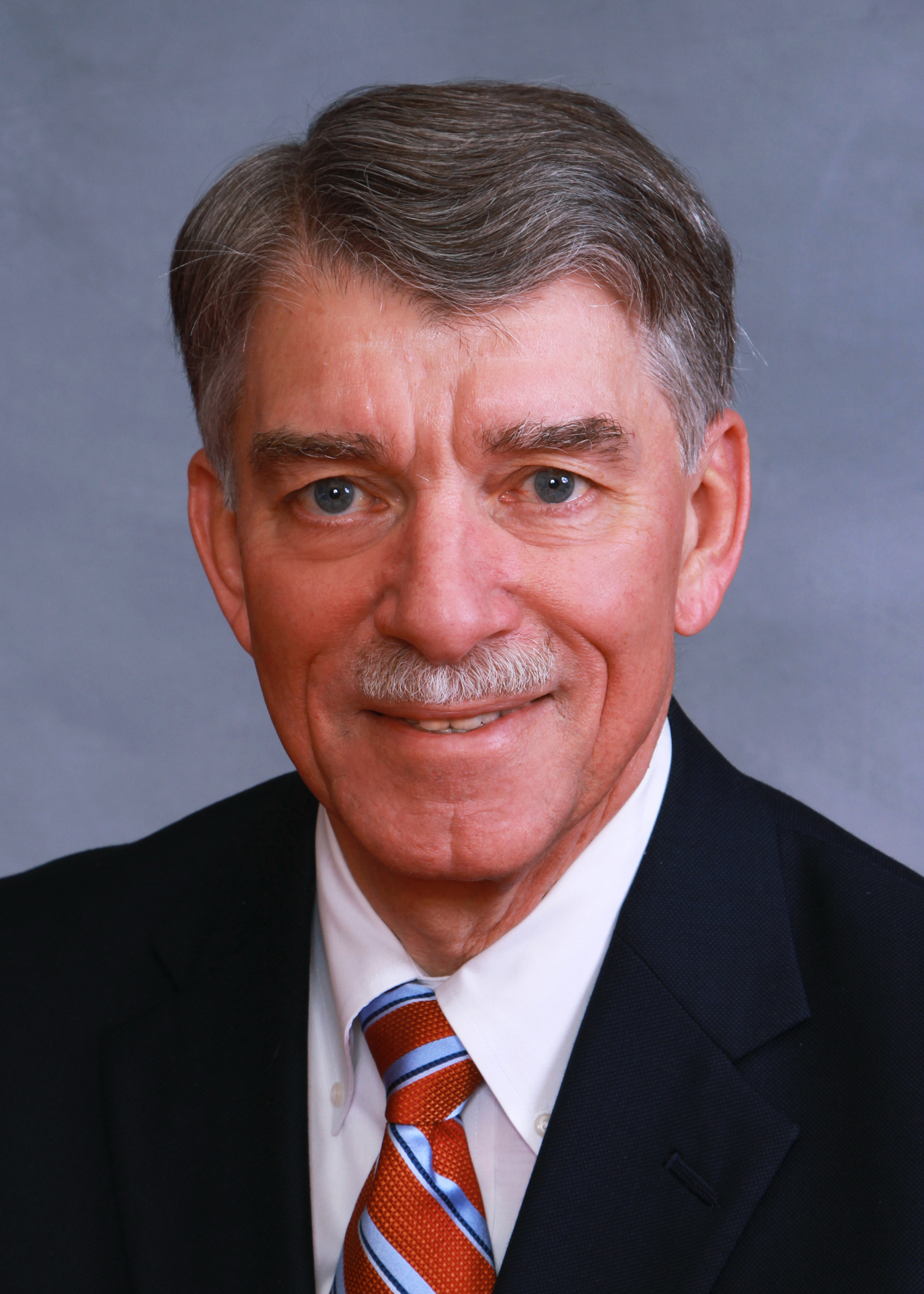
	Majority party	Minority party
Leader	Thom Tillis	Joe Hackney (retired)
Party	Republican	Democratic
Leader since	January 26, 2011	January 1, 2007
Leader's seat	98th - Cornelius	54th - Chapel Hill
Last election	68	52
Seats won	77	43
Seat change	▲9	▼9
- Results: Democratic hold Democratic gain Republican hold Republican gain
Speaker before election
Thom Tillis
Republican
Elected Speaker
Thom Tillis
Republican

An election was held on November 6, 2012 to elect all 120 members to North Carolina's House of Representatives. The election coincided with elections for other offices, including Presidency, Governor, U.S. House of Representatives, and State Senate. The primary election was held on May 8, 2012 with a primary run-off held on July 17, 2012.

== Results summary ==
District	Incumbent	Party	Elected	Party
1st	Bill Owens†	Dem	Bob Steinburg	Rep
2nd	Winkie Wilkins (Note: Redistricted from the 55th District.)	Dem	Winkie Wilkins	Dem
2nd	Jim Crawford (Note: Redistricted from the 32nd District.)	Dem	Winkie Wilkins	Dem
3rd	Norman Sanderson†	Rep	Michael Speciale	Rep
4th	Jimmy Dixon	Rep	Jimmy Dixon	Rep
4th	Efton Sager (Note: Redistricted from the 11th District.)	Rep	Jimmy Dixon	Rep
5th	Annie Mobley	Dem	Annie Mobley	Dem
6th	Bill Cook†	Rep	Paul Tine	Dem
6th	Timothy Spear† (Note: Redistricted from the 2nd District.)	Dem	Paul Tine	Dem
7th	Angela Bryant	Dem	Angela Bryant	Dem
8th	Edith Warren†	Dem	Susan Martin	Rep
9th	Marian McLawhorn	Dem	Brian Brown	Rep
10th	Karen Kozel†	Rep	John Bell	Rep
11th	Jennifer Weiss† (Note: Redistricted from the 35th District.)	Dem	Duane Hall	Dem
12th	Barbara Lee†	Dem	George Graham	Dem
13th	Pat McElraft	Rep	Pat McElraft	Rep
14th	George Cleveland	Rep	George Cleveland	Rep
15th	Phil Shepard	Rep	Phil Shepard	Rep
16th	Carolyn Justice†	Rep	Chris Millis	Rep
17th	Frank Iler	Rep	Frank Iler	Rep
18th	Susi Hamilton	Dem	Susi Hamilton	Dem
19th	Ted Davis Jr.	Rep	Ted Davis Jr.	Rep
20th	New Seat		Rick Catlin	Rep
21st	Larry Bell	Dem	Larry Bell	Dem
22nd	William Brisson	Dem	William Brisson	Dem
23rd	Joe Tolson	Dem	Joe Tolson	Dem
24th	Jean Farmer-Butterfield	Dem	Jean Farmer-Butterfield	Dem
25th	Jeff Collins	Rep	Jeff Collins	Rep
25th	Glen Bradley† (Note: Redistricted from the 49th District.)	Rep	Jeff Collins	Rep
26th	Leo Daughtry	Rep	Leo Daughtry	Rep
27th	Michael Wray	Dem	Michael Wray	Dem
28th	James Langdon Jr.	Rep	James Langdon Jr.	Rep
29th	Larry Hall	Dem	Larry Hall	Dem
30th	Paul Luebke	Dem	Paul Luebke	Dem
31st	Mickey Michaux	Dem	Mickey Michaux	Dem
32nd	New Seat		Nathan Baskerville	Dem
33rd	Rosa Gill	Dem	Rosa Gill	Dem
34th	Deborah Ross (Note: Redistricted from the 38th District.)	Dem	Deborah Ross	Dem
34th	Grier Martin†	Dem	Deborah Ross	Dem
35th	New Seat		Chris Malone	Rep
36th	Nelson Dollar	Rep	Nelson Dollar	Rep
37th	Paul Stam	Rep	Paul Stam	Rep
38th	New Seat		Yvonne Lewis Holley	Dem
39th	Darren Jackson	Dem	Darren Jackson	Dem
40th	Marilyn Avila	Rep	Marilyn Avila	Rep
41st	Tom Murry	Rep	Tom Murry	Rep
42nd	Marvin Lucas	Dem	Marvin Lucas	Dem
43rd	Elmer Floyd	Dem	Elmer Floyd	Dem
44th	Rick Glazier (Note: Redistricted from the 45th District.)	Dem	Rick Glazier	Dem
44th	Dianne Parfitt†	Dem	Rick Glazier	Dem
45th	New Seat		John Szoka	Rep
46th	Gaston (G. L.) Pridgen	Rep	Ken Waddell	Dem
46th	Dewey Hill† (Note: Redistricted from the 20th District.)	Dem	Ken Waddell	Dem
47th	Charles Graham	Dem	Charles Graham	Dem
48th	Garland Pierce	Dem	Garland Pierce	Dem
49th	New Seat		Jim Fulghum	Rep
50th	Bill Faison†	Dem	Valerie Foushee	Dem
51st	Mike Stone	Rep	Mike Stone	Rep
52nd	Jamie Boles	Rep	Jamie Boles	Rep
53rd	David Lewis	Rep	David Lewis	Rep
54th	Joe Hackney†	Dem	Deb McManus	Dem
55th	Frank McGuirt† (Note: Redistricted from the 69th District.)	Dem	Mark Brody	Rep
56th	Verla Insko	Dem	Verla Insko	Dem
57th	Pricey Harrison	Dem	Pricey Harrison	Dem
57th	Maggie Jeffus† (Note: Redistricted from the 59th District.)	Dem	Pricey Harrison	Dem
58th	Alma Adams	Dem	Alma Adams	Dem
59th	New Seat		Jon Hardister	Rep
60th	Marcus Brandon	Dem	Marcus Brandon	Dem
61st	John Faircloth	Rep	John Faircloth	Rep
62nd	John Blust	Rep	John Blust	Rep
63rd	Alice Bordsen†	Dem	Stephen Ross	Rep
64th	Dan Ingle†	Rep	Dennis Riddell	Rep
65th	Bert Jones	Rep	Bert Jones	Rep
66th	Ken Goodman	Dem	Ken Goodman	Dem
67th	Justin Burr	Rep	Justin Burr	Rep
68th	Craig Horn	Rep	Craig Horn	Rep
69th	New Seat		Dean Arp	Rep
70th	Pat Hurley	Rep	Pat Hurley	Rep
71st	Larry Womble†	Dem	Evelyn Terry	Dem
72nd	Earline Parmon†	Dem	Ed Hanes	Dem
73rd	Mark Hollo (Note: Redistricted from the 88th District.)	Rep	Mark Hollo	Rep
73rd	Darrell McCormick (Note: Redistricted from the 92nd District.)	Rep	Mark Hollo	Rep
74th	Dale Folwell†	Rep	Debra Conrad	Rep
74th	Joyce Krawiec† (Note: Redistricted from the 73rd District.)	Rep	Debra Conrad	Rep
75th	Bill McGee†	Rep	Donny Lambeth	Rep
76th	Fred Steen II†	Rep	Carl Ford	Rep
77th	Harry Warren	Rep	Harry Warren	Rep
78th	Allen McNeill	Rep	Allen McNeill	Rep
79th	Julia Craven Howard	Rep	Julia Craven Howard	Rep
80th	Jerry Dockham	Rep	Jerry Dockham	Rep
81st	Rayne Brown	Rep	Rayne Brown	Rep
82nd	Larry Pittman	Rep	Larry Pittman	Rep
83rd	Linda Johnson	Rep	Linda Johnson	Rep
84th	New Seat		Rena Turner	Rep
85th	Mitch Gillespie	Rep	Mitch Gillespie	Rep
85th	Phillip Frye† (Note: Redistricted from the 84th District.)	Rep	Mitch Gillespie	Rep
86th	Hugh Blackwell	Rep	Hugh Blackwell	Rep
87th	Edgar Starnes	Rep	Edgar Starnes	Rep
88th	Martha Alexander (Note: Redistricted from the 106th District.)	Dem	Rob Bryan	Rep
89th	Mitchell Setzer	Rep	Mitchell Setzer	Rep
90th	Sarah Stevens	Rep	Sarah Stevens	Rep
91st	Bryan Holloway	Rep	Bryan Holloway	Rep
92nd	New Seat		Charles Jeter	Rep
93rd	Jonathan Jordan	Rep	Jonathan Jordan	Rep
94th	Shirley Randleman†	Rep	Jeffrey Elmore	Rep
95th	Grey Mills†	Rep	Robert Brawley	Rep
96th	Mark Hilton†	Rep	Andy Wells	Rep
97th	Jason Saine	Rep	Jason Saine	Rep
98th	Thom Tillis	Rep	Thom Tillis	Rep
99th	Rodney Moore	Dem	Rodney Moore	Dem
100th	Tricia Cotham	Dem	Tricia Cotham	Dem
101st	Beverly Earle	Dem	Beverly Earle	Dem
102nd	Becky Carney	Dem	Becky Carney	Dem
103rd	Bill Brawley	Rep	Bill Brawley	Rep
104th	Ruth Samuelson	Rep	Ruth Samuelson	Rep
105th	Ric Killian†	Rep	Jacqueline Schaffer	Rep
106th	New Seat		Carla Cunningham	Dem
107th	Kelly Alexander	Dem	Kelly Alexander	Dem
108th	John Torbett	Rep	John Torbett	Rep
109th	William Current†	Rep	Dana Bumgardner	Rep
110th	Kelly Hastings	Rep	Kelly Hastings	Rep
111th	Tim Moore	Rep	Tim Moore	Rep
112th	Mike Hager	Rep	Mike Hager	Rep
113th	Trudi Walend	Rep	Chris Whitmire	Rep
114th	Susan Fisher	Dem	Susan Fisher	Dem
115th	Patsy Keever†	Dem	Nathan Ramsey	Rep
116th	Tim Moffitt	Rep	Tim Moffitt	Rep
117th	Chuck McGrady	Rep	Chuck McGrady	Rep
118th	Ray Rapp	Dem	Michele Presnell	Rep
119th	Phil Haire†	Dem	Joe Sam Queen	Dem
120th	Roger West	Rep	Roger West	Rep

† - Incumbent not seeking re-election

== Outgoing incumbents ==
=== Retiring ===
- Bill Owens (D-District 1) declined to seek re-election.
- Timothy Spear (D-District 2) declined to seek re-election after his seat was merged with the 6th district.
- Edith Warren (D-District 8) declined to seek re-election.
- Dewey Hill (D-District 20) declined to seek re-election after his seat was merged with the 46th district.
- Grier Martin (D-District 34) declined to seek re-election after the 38th district was merged with his district.
- Dianne Parfitt (D-District 44) declined to seek re-election after the 45th district was merged with her 44th district.
- Maggie Jeffus (D-District 59) declined to seek re-election after her seat was merged with the 57th district.
- Alice Bordsen (D-District 63) declined to seek re-election.
- Frank McGuirt (D-District 69) declined to seek re-election in the renumbered 55th district.
- Phillip Frye (R-District 84) declined to seek re-election after his seat was merged with the 85th district.

=== Seeking other office ===
- Norman Sanderson (R-District 3) ran for the State Senate.
- Bill Cook (R-District 6) ran for the State Senate.
- Glen Bradley (R-District 49) ran for the State Senate after his seat was merged with the 25th district.
- Earline Parmon (District 72) ran for the State Senate.
- Shirley Randleman (R-District 94) ran for the State Senate.
- Patsy Keever (D-District 115) ran for the U.S. House.

=== Lost renomination ===
- Stephen LaRoque (R-District 10), defeated by John Bell (R).
- Efton Sager (R-District 11), lost a redistricting race to Jimmy Dixon (R-District 4).
- Jim Crawford (D-District 32), lost a redistricting race to Winkie Wilkins (D-District 55) with the district renumbered as District 2.
- Larry Brown (R-District 73), lost to Debra Conrad (R) after his district was merged with the 74th district.
- Darrell McCormick (R-District 92), lost a redistricting race to Mark Hollo (R-District 88) with the district renumbered as District 73.

=== Defeated in general election ===
- Marian McLawhorn (D-District 9), defeated Brian Brown (R).
- Gaston (G.L.) Pridgen (R-District 46), defeated by Ken Waddell (D).
- Martha Alexander (D-District 106), defeated by Rob Bryan (R) with the district renumbered as District 88.
- Ray Rapp (D-District 118), defeated by Michele Presnell (R).

== Predictions ==
Source	Ranking	As of
Governing	Likely R	October 24, 2012

== Detailed Results ==
=== Districts 1-19 ===
==== District 1 ====
Incumbent Democrat Bill Owens has represented the 1st District since 1995. Owens didn't seek re-election and Republican Bob Steinburg won the open seat.

North Carolina House of Representatives 1st district general election, 2012
Party	Candidate	Votes	%
Republican	Bob Steinburg	21,505	56.34%
Democratic	Bill Luton	16,663	43.66%
Total votes		38,168	100%
Republican gain from Democratic			

==== District 2 ====
The new 2nd district based in Person and Granville counties includes the homes of Incumbent Democrats Jim Crawford, who has represented the 32nd district and its predecessors since 1995, and Winkie Wilkins, who has represented the 55th district and its predecessors since 2005. Wilkins defeated Crawford in the Democratic primary and was re-elected to another term.

North Carolina House of Representatives 2nd district general election, 2012
Party	Candidate	Votes	%
Democratic	Winkie Wilkins (incumbent)	20,398	56.68%
Republican	Timothy Karan	15,587	43.32%
Total votes		35,985	100%
Democratic hold			

==== District 3 ====
Incumbent Republican Norman Sanderson has represented the 3rd district since 2011. Sanderson ran for the State Senate. Republican Michael Speciale won the open seat.

North Carolina House of Representatives 3rd district general election, 2012
Party	Candidate	Votes	%
Republican	Michael Speciale	20,811	59.24%
Democratic	Robert B. Clayton	14,320	40.76%
Total votes		35,131	100%
Republican hold			

==== District 4 ====
The new 4th district lost its share of Onslow County but gains portions of Wayne County. The new district includes the homes of incumbent Incumbent Republicans Jimmy Dixon, who has represented the 4th district since 2011, and Efton Sager, who has represented the 11th district since 2009. Dixon defeated Sager in the Republican primary and was easily elected to a second term.

North Carolina House of Representatives 4th district general election, 2012
Party	Candidate	Votes	%
Republican	Jimmy Dixon (incumbent)	20,371	65.04%
Democratic	Rebecca H. Judge	9,896	31.60%
Libertarian	Kevin E. Hayes	1,053	3.36%
Total votes		31,320	100%
Republican hold			

==== District 5 ====
Incumbent Democrat Annie Mobley has represented the 5th district since 2007.

North Carolina House of Representatives 5th district general election, 2012
Party	Candidate	Votes	%
Democratic	Annie Mobley (incumbent)	27,458	100%
Total votes		27,458	100%
Democratic hold			

==== District 6 ====
The new 6th district includes the homes of Incumbent Republican Bill Cook, who has represented the 6th district 2011, and Democrat Timothy Spear, who has represented the 2nd district since 2006. Neither Cook nor Spear sought re-election here. Cook ran for the State Senate. Democrat Paul Tine won the open seat.

North Carolina House of Representatives 6th district general election, 2012
Party	Candidate	Votes	%
Democratic	Paul Tine	20,756	50.56%
Republican	Mattie Lawson	20,298	49.44%
Total votes		41,054	100%
Democratic gain from Republican			

==== District 7 ====
Incumbent Democrat Angela Bryant has represented the 7th district since 2007.

North Carolina House of Representatives 7th district general election, 2012
Party	Candidate	Votes	%
Democratic	Angela Bryant (incumbent)	27,761	100%
Total votes		27,761	100%
Democratic hold			

==== District 8 ====
Incumbent Democrat Edith Warren has represented the 8th district and its predecessors since 1999. Warren didn't seek re-election and Republican Susan Martin won the open seat.

North Carolina House of Representatives 8th district general election, 2012
Party	Candidate	Votes	%
Republican	Susan Martin	24,019	57.19%
Democratic	Mark Bibbs	17,982	42.81%
Total votes		42,001	100%
Republican gain from Democratic			

==== District 9 ====
Incumbent Democrat Marian McLawhorn has represented the 9th district since 1999. McLawhorn lost re-election to Republican Brian Brown won the general election.

North Carolina House of representatives 9th district general election, 2012
Party	Candidate	Votes	%
Republican	Brian Brown	19,780	51.48%
Democratic	Marian McLawhorn (incumbent)	18,644	48.52%
Total votes		38,424	100%
Republican gain from Democratic			

==== District 10 ====
Incumbent Republican Stephen LaRoque has represented the 10th district since 2011. LaRoque was defeated for re-nomination by John Bell. LaRoque resigned before the end of his term and Karen Kozel was appointed to fill the balance of his term. Bell won the general election to succeed Kozel.

North Carolina House of Representatives 10th district general election, 2012
Party	Candidate	Votes	%
Republican	John Bell	24,475	66.61%
Democratic	Jim Babe Hardison	12,270	33.39%
Total votes		36,745	100%
Republican hold			

==== District 11 ====
The new 11th district overlaps with much of the former 35th district and continues to favor Democrats. Incumbent Democrat Jennifer Weiss, who has represented the 35th district and its predecessors since 1999, didn't seek re-election. Democrat Duane Hall won the open seat.

North Carolina House of Representatives 11th district general election, 2012
Party	Candidate	Votes	%
Democratic	Duane Hall	27,247	100%
Total votes		27,247	100%
Democratic hold			

==== District 12 ====
Incumbent Democrat Barbara Lee has represented the 12th district since her appointment in August 2012. Lee didn't seek election to the seat and Democrat George Graham won the open seat.

North Carolina House of Representatives 12th district general election, 2012
Party	Candidate	Votes	%
Democratic	George Graham	22,064	65.85%
Republican	Jim Dancy	11,443	34.15%
Total votes		33,507	100%
Democratic hold			

==== District 13 ====
Incumbent Republican Pat McElraft has represented the 13th district since 2007.

North Carolina House of Representatives 13th district general election, 2012
Party	Candidate	Votes	%
Republican	Pat McElraft (incumbent)	28,416	88.34%
Libertarian	Wyatt Rike	3,752	11.66%
Total votes		32,168	100%
Republican hold			

==== District 14 ====
Incumbent Republican George Cleveland has represented the 14th district since 2005.

North Carolina House of Representatives 14th district general election, 2012
Party	Candidate	Votes	%
Republican	George Cleveland (incumbent)	15,861	100%
Total votes		15,861	100%
Republican hold			

==== District 15 ====
Incumbent Republican Phil Shepard has represented the 15th district since 2011.

North Carolina House of Representatives 15th district general election, 2012
Party	Candidate	Votes	%
Republican	Phil Shepard (incumbent)	12,111	100%
Total votes		12,111	100%
Republican hold			

==== District 16 ====
Incumbent Republican Carolyn Justice has represented the 16th district since 2003. Justice didn't seek re-election and Republican Chris Millis won the open seat.

North Carolina House of Representatives 16th district general election, 2012
Party	Candidate	Votes	%
Republican	Chris Millis	22,254	100%
Total votes		22,254	100%
Republican hold			

==== District 17 ====
Incumbent Republican Frank Iler has represented the 17th district since 2009.

North Carolina House of representatives 17th district general election, 2012
Party	Candidate	Votes	%
Republican	Frank Iler (incumbent)	27,578	66.16%
Democratic	Lundia Washington	14,107	33.84%
Total votes		41,685	100%
Republican hold			

==== District 18 ====
Incumbent Democrat Susi Hamilton has represented the 18th district since 2011.

North Carolina House of Representatives 18th district general election, 2012
Party	Candidate	Votes	%
Democratic	Susi Hamilton (incumbent)	22,588	66.53%
Republican	Louis Harmati	11,362	33.47%
Total votes		33,950	100%
Democratic hold			

==== District 19 ====
Incumbent Republican Ted Davis Jr. has represented the 19th district since his appointment in September 2012. Davis was elected to a full term.

North Carolina House of Representatives 19th district general election, 2012
Party	Candidate	Votes	%
Republican	Ted Davis Jr. (incumbent)	22,958	60.27%
Democratic	Emilie Swearingen	15,131	39.73%
Total votes		38,089	100%
Republican hold			

=== Districts 20-39 ===
==== District 20 ====
The new 20th district is based in New Hanover County and is expected to favor Republicans. Republican Rick Catlin won the open seat.

North Carolina House of Representatives 20th district general election, 2012
Party	Candidate	Votes	%
Republican	Rick Catlin	25,282	64.07%
Democratic	Tom Gale	14,179	35.93%
Total votes		39,461	100%
Republican win (new seat)			

==== District 21 ====
Incumbent Democrat Larry Bell has represented the 21st district since 2001.

North Carolina House of Representatives 21st district general election, 2012
Party	Candidate	Votes	%
Democratic	Larry Bell (incumbent)	25,631	100%
Total votes		25,631	100%
Democratic hold			

==== District 22 ====
Incumbent Democrat William Brisson has represented the 22nd district since 2007.

North Carolina House of Representatives 22nd district general election, 2012
Party	Candidate	Votes	%
Democratic	William Brisson (incumbent)	21,187	100%
Total votes		21,187	100%
Democratic hold			

==== District 23 ====
Incumbent Democrat Joe Tolson has represented the 23rd district and its predecessors since 1997.

North Carolina House of Representatives 23rd district general election, 2012
Party	Candidate	Votes	%
Democratic	Joe Tolson (incumbent)	30,670	100%
Total votes		30,670	100%
Democratic hold			

==== District 24 ====
Incumbent Democrat Jean Farmer-Butterfield has represented the 24th district since 2003.

North Carolina House of Representatives 24th district general election, 2012
Party	Candidate	Votes	%
Democratic	Jean Farmer-Butterfield (incumbent)	28,724	100%
Total votes		28,724	100%
Democratic hold			

==== District 25 ====
The new 25th district has been drawn to be more Republican than its predecessor and in addition to its share of Nash County it gained portions of Franklin County. Incumbent Republicans Jeff Collins, who has represented the 25th district since 2011, and Glen Bradley, who has represented the 49th district since 2011, were both redistricted here. Bradley sought the Republican nomination for State Senate District 18, while Collins was re-elected here.

North Carolina House of Representatives 25th district general election, 2012
Party	Candidate	Votes	%
Republican	Jeff Collins (incumbent)	24,434	63.30%
Democratic	Janice (Jan) Mills	14,164	36.70%
Total votes		38,598	100%
Republican hold			

==== District 26 ====
Incumbent Republican Leo Daughtry has represented the 26th district and its predecessors since 1993.

North Carolina House of Representatives 26th district general election, 2012
Party	Candidate	Votes	%
Republican	Leo Daughtry (incumbent)	23,125	59.67%
Democratic	Jenifer Bubenik	15,633	40.33%
Total votes		38,758	100%
Republican hold			

==== District 27 ====
Incumbent Democrat Michael Wray has represented the 27th district since 2005.

North Carolina House of Representatives 27th district general election, 2012
Party	Candidate	Votes	%
Democratic	Michael Wray (incumbent)	29,714	90.94%
Libertarian	Jesse Shearin	2,960	9.06%
Total votes		32,674	100%
Democratic hold			

==== District 28 ====
Incumbent Republican James Langdon Jr. has represented the 28th district since 2005.

North Carolina House of Representatives 28th district general election, 2012
Party	Candidate	Votes	%
Republican	James Langdon Jr. (incumbent)	25,169	100%
Total votes		25,169	100%
Republican hold			

==== District 29 ====
Incumbent Democrat Larry Hall has represented the 29th district since 2006.

North Carolina House of Representatives 29th district general election, 2012
Party	Candidate	Votes	%
Democratic	Larry Hall (incumbent)	38,181	100%
Total votes		38,181	100%
Democratic hold			

==== District 30 ====
Incumbent Democrat Paul Luebke has represented the 30th district and its predecessors since 1991.

North Carolina House of Representatives 30th district general election, 2012
Party	Candidate	Votes	%
Democratic	Paul Luebke (incumbent)	33,697	100%
Total votes		33,697	100%
Democratic hold			

==== District 31 ====
Incumbent Democrat Mickey Michaux has represented the 31st district and its predecessors since 1983.

North Carolina House of Representatives 31st district general election, 2012
Party	Candidate	Votes	%
Democratic	Mickey Michaux (incumbent)	32,497	100%
Total votes		32,497	100%
Democratic hold			

==== District 32 ====
The new 32nd district includes all of Warren and Vance counties as well as the northern portion of Granville County. The new district is expected to favor Democrats. Democrat Nathan Baskerville won the open seat.

North Carolina House of Representatives 32nd district general election, 2012
Party	Candidate	Votes	%
Democratic	Nathan Baskerville	27,057	70.78%
Republican	Scott Bynum	11,170	29.22%
Total votes		38,227	100%
Democratic win (new seat)			

==== District 33 ====
Incumbent Democrat Rosa Gill has represented the 33rd district since 2009.

North Carolina House of Representatives 33rd district general election, 2012
Party	Candidate	Votes	%
Democratic	Rosa Gill (incumbent)	31,386	100%
Total votes		31,386	100%
Democratic hold			

==== District 34 ====
The new 34th district includes the homes of Incumbent Democrats Grier Martin, who has represented the 34th district since 2005, and Deborah Ross, who has represented the 38th district since 2003. Martin retired and Ross was re-elected here.

North Carolina House of Representatives 34th district general election, 2012
Party	Candidate	Votes	%
Democratic	Deborah Ross (incumbent)	32,206	97.37%
Write-in		521	1.58%
Independent	Apryl Major (write-in)	348	1.05%
Total votes		33,075	100%
Democratic hold			

==== District 35 ====
The new 35th district is based in northern Wake County and isn't safe for either party. Republican Chris Malone won the open seat.

North Carolina House of Representatives 35th district general election, 2012
Party	Candidate	Votes	%
Republican	Chris Malone	20,435	50.82%
Democratic	Lori B. Millberg	19,778	49.18%
Total votes		40,213	100%
Republican win (new seat)			

==== District 36 ====
Incumbent Republican Nelson Dollar has represented the 36th district since 2005.

North Carolina House of Representatives 36th district general election, 2012
Party	Candidate	Votes	%
Republican	Nelson Dollar (incumbent)	26,217	54.96%
Democratic	Lisa Baker	21,485	45.04%
Total votes		47,702	100%
Republican hold			

==== District 37 ====
Incumbent Republican Paul Stam has represented the 37th district since 2003.

North Carolina House of Representatives 37th district general election, 2012
Party	Candidate	Votes	%
Republican	Paul Stam (incumbent)	24,942	57.01%
Democratic	Jason Ora Wunsch	18,809	42.99%
Total votes		43,751	100%
Republican hold			

==== District 38 ====
The new 38th district continues to be based in Wake County and remains staunchly Democratic. Democrat Yvonne Lewis Holley won the open seat.

North Carolina House of Representatives 38th district general election, 2012
Party	Candidate	Votes	%
Democratic	Yvonne Lewis Holley	29,665	87.68%
Independent	Shane Murphy	4,169	12.32%
Total votes		33,834	100%
Democratic win (new seat)			

==== District 39 ====
Incumbent Democrat Darren Jackson has represented the 39th district since 2009.

North Carolina House of Representatives 39th district general election, 2012
Party	Candidate	Votes	%
Democratic	Darren Jackson (incumbent)	27,585	100%
Total votes		27,585	100%
Democratic hold			

=== Districts 40-59 ===
==== District 40 ====
Incumbent Republican Marilyn Avila has represented the 40th district since 2007.

North Carolina House of Representatives 40th district general election, 2012
Party	Candidate	Votes	%
Republican	Marilyn Avila (incumbent)	22,613	53.86%
Democratic	William (Watt) Jones	17,541	41.78%
Libertarian	Ron Reale	1,828	4.35%
Total votes		41,982	100%
Republican hold			

==== District 41 ====
Incumbent Republican Tom Murry has represented the 41st district since 2011.

North Carolina House of Representatives 41st district general election, 2012
Party	Candidate	Votes	%
Republican	Tom Murry (incumbent)	21,639	51.78%
Democratic	Jim Messina	20,150	48.22%
Total votes		41,789	100%
Republican hold			

==== District 42 ====
Incumbent Democrat Marvin Lucas has represented the 42nd district and its predecessors since 2001.

North Carolina House of Representatives 42nd district general election, 2012
Party	Candidate	Votes	%
Democratic	Marvin Lucas (incumbent)	23,240	77.45%
Republican	Frank Racz	6,766	22.55%
Total votes		30,006	100%
Democratic hold			

==== District 43 ====
Incumbent Democrat Elmer Floyd has represented the 43rd district since 2009.

North Carolina House of Representatives 43rd district general election, 2012
Party	Candidate	Votes	%
Democratic	Elmer Floyd (incumbent)	23,832	69.58%
Republican	Diana Carroll	10,417	30.42%
Total votes		34,249	100%
Democratic hold			

==== District 44 ====
The new 44th district includes the homes Incumbent Democrats Dianne Parfitt, who has represented the 44th district since and Rick Glazier, who has represented the 45th district and its predecessors since 2003. Parfitt didn't seek re-election while Glazier was re-elected here.

North Carolina House of Representatives 44th district general election, 2012
Party	Candidate	Votes	%
Democratic	Rick Glazier (incumbent)	17,266	56.31%
Republican	Richard D. Button	13,398	43.69%
Total votes		30,664	100%
Democratic hold			

==== District 45 ====
The new 45th district continues to based in Cumberland County but has been drawn to be more Republican than its predecessor. Republican John Szoka won the open seat.

North Carolina House of Representatives 45th district general election, 2012
Party	Candidate	Votes	%
Republican	John Szoka	16,208	56.40%
Democratic	Eddie Dees	12,532	43.60%
Total votes		28,740	100%
Republican win (new seat)			

==== District 46 ====
The new 46th district lost its share of Hoke and Scotland counties but gained all of Columbus County and a southwestern portion of Bladen County, North Carolina. The new district includes the homes of Incumbent Republican Gaston (G. L.) Pridgen, who has represented the 46th district since 2011, and Incumbent Democrat Dewey Hill, who has represented the 20th district and its predecessors since 1992. Hill didn't seek re-election. Pridgen ran for re-election but was defeated by Democrat Ken Waddell

North Carolina House of Representatives 46th district general election, 2012
Party	Candidate	Votes	%
Democratic	Ken Waddell	18,160	54.06%
Republican	Gaston (G.L.) Pridgen (incumbent)	15,431	45.94%
Total votes		33,591	100%
Democratic gain from Republican			

==== District 47 ====
Incumbent Democrat Charles Graham has represented the 47th district since 2011.

North Carolina House of Representatives 47th district general election, 2012
Party	Candidate	Votes	%
Democratic	Charles Graham (incumbent)	18,322	100%
Total votes		18,322	100%
Democratic hold			

==== District 48 ====
Incumbent Democrat Garland Pierce has represented the 48th district since 2005.

North Carolina House of Representatives 48th district general election, 2012
Party	Candidate	Votes	%
Democratic	Garland Pierce (incumbent)	27,193	100%
Total votes		27,193	100%
Democratic hold			

==== District 49 ====
The new 49th district is based in Wake County and isn't safe for either party. Republican Jim Fulghum won the open seat.

North Carolina House of Representatives 49th district general election, 2012
Party	Candidate	Votes	%
Republican	Jim Fulghum	28,300	53.97%
Democratic	Keith Karlsson	24,134	46.03%
Total votes		52,434	100%
Republican win (new seat)			

==== District 50 ====
Incumbent Democrat Bill Faison has represented the 50th district since 2005. Faison sought the Democratic nomination for Governor. Democrat Valerie Foushee won the open seat.

North Carolina House of Represesntatives 50th district general election, 2012
Party	Candidate	Votes	%
Democratic	Valerie Foushee	24,806	55.04%
Republican	Rod Chaney	20,266	44.96%
Total votes		45,072	100%
Democratic hold			

==== District 51 ====
Incumbent Republican Mike Stone has represented the 51st district since 2011.

North Carolina House of Representatives 51st district general election, 2012
Party	Candidate	Votes	%
Republican	Mike Stone (incumbent)	15,764	52.03%
Democratic	W.P. (Bill) Tatum	14,533	47.97%
Total votes		30,297	100%
Republican hold			

==== District 52 ====
Incumbent Republican Jamie Boles has represented the 52nd district since 2009.

North Carolina House of Representatives 52nd district general election, 2012
Party	Candidate	Votes	%
Republican	Jamie Boles (incumbent)	27,521	100%
Total votes		27,521	100%
Republican hold			

==== District 53 ====
Incumbent Republican David Lewis has represented the 53rd district since 2003.

North Carolina House of Representatives 53rd district general election, 2012
Party	Candidate	Votes	%
Republican	David Lewis (incumbent)	17,365	56.50%
Democratic	Joe E. Langley	13,370	43.50%
Total votes		30,735	100%
Republican hold			

==== District 54 ====
Incumbent Democratic Minority Leader Joe Hackney has represented the 54th district and its predecessors since 1981. Hackney didn't seek re-election. Democrat Deb McManus won the open seat.

North Carolina House of Representatives 54th district general election, 2012
Party	Candidate	Votes	%
Democratic	Deb McManus	22,159	56.10%
Republican	Cathy Wright	17,339	43.90%
Total votes		39,498	100%
Democratic hold			

==== District 55 ====
The new 55th district overlaps with much of the former 69th district. Incumbent Democrat Frank McGuirt, who has represented the 69th district since his appointment in March 2011, didn't seek re-election. Republican Mark Brody won the open seat.

North Carolina House of Representatives 55th district general election, 2012
Party	Candidate	Votes	%
Republican	Mark Brody	18,962	56.60%
Democratic	Dale Nelson	14,540	43.40%
Total votes		33,502	100%
Republican gain from Democratic			

==== District 56 ====
Incumbent Democrat Verla Insko has represented the 56th district and its predecessors since 1997.

North Carolina House of Representatives 56th district general election, 2012
Party	Candidate	Votes	%
Democratic	Verla Insko (incumbent)	35,173	77.44%
Republican	Karrie Mead	10,248	22.56%
Total votes		45,421	100%
Democratic hold			

==== District 57 ====
The new 57th district includes the homes of Incumbent Democrats Pricey Harrison, who has represented the 57th district since 2005, and Maggie Jeffus, who has represented the 59th district and its predecessors since 1991. Jeffus retired and Harrison was re-elected to another term unopposed.

North Carolina House of Representatives 57th district general election, 2012
Party	Candidate	Votes	%
Democratic	Pricey Harrison (incumbent)	32,020	100%
Total votes		32,020	100%
Democratic hold			

==== District 58 ====
Incumbent Democrat Alma Adams has represented the 58th district and its predecessors since 1994.

North Carolina House of Representatives 58th district general election, 2012
Party	Candidate	Votes	%
Democratic	Alma Adams (incumbent)	32,895	79.86%
Republican	Olga Morgan Wright	8,294	20.14%
Total votes		41,189	100%
Democratic hold			

==== District 59 ====
The new 59th district continues to be based in Guilford County but has been drawn to be favorable to Republicans. Republican Jon Hardister won the open seat.

North Carolina House of Representatives 58th district general election, 2012
Party	Candidate	Votes	%
Republican	Jon Hardister	32,872	100%
Total votes		32,872	100%
Republican win (new seat)			

=== Districts 60-79 ===
==== District 60 ====
Incumbent Democrat Marcus Brandon has represented the 60th district since 2011.

North Carolina House of Representatives 58th district general election, 2012
Party	Candidate	Votes	%
Democratic	Marcus Brandon (incumbent)	27,755	100%
Total votes		27,755	100%
Democratic hold			

==== District 61 ====
Incumbent Republican John Faircloth has represented the 61st District since 2011.

North Carolina House of Representatives 61st district general election, 2012
Party	Candidate	Votes	%
Republican	John Faircloth (incumbent)	26,465	63.84%
Democratic	Ron Weatherford	14,988	36.16%
Total votes		41,453	100%
Republican hold			

==== District 62 ====
Incumbent Republican John Blust has represented the 62nd District and its predecessors since 2001.

North Carolina House of Representatives 62nd district general election, 2012
Party	Candidate	Votes	%
Republican	John Blust (incumbent)	27,633	76.32%
Libertarian	Kent P. Wilsey	8,574	23.68%
Total votes		36,207	100%
Republican hold			

==== District 63 ====
Incumbent Democrat Alice Bordsen has represented the 63rd District since 2003. Bordsen didn't seek re-election and Republican Stephen Ross won the open seat.

North Carolina House of Representatives 63rd district general election, 2012
Party	Candidate	Votes	%
Republican	Stephen Ross	19,435	56.65%
Democratic	Patty Philipps	14,870	43.35%
Total votes		34,305	100%
Republican gain from Democratic			

==== District 64 ====
Incumbent Republican Dan Ingle has represented the 64th District since 2009. Republican Dennis Riddell won the open seat.

North Carolina House of Representatives 64th district general election, 2012
Party	Candidate	Votes	%
Republican	Dennis Riddell	18,296	58.99%
Democratic	Morris McAdoo	12,721	41.01%
Total votes		31,017	100%
Republican hold			

==== District 65 ====
Incumbent Republican Bert Jones has represented the 65th District since 2011.

North Carolina House of Representatives 65th district general election, 2012
Party	Candidate	Votes	%
Republican	Bert Jones (incumbent)	21,324	59.47%
Democratic	William E. Osborne	14,534	40.53%
Total votes		35,858	100%
Republican hold			

==== District 66 ====
Incumbent Democrat Ken Goodman has represented the 66th District since 2011.

North Carolina House of Representatives 66th district general election, 2012
Party	Candidate	Votes	%
Democratic	Ken Goodman (incumbent)	21,659	100%
Total votes		21,659	100%
Democratic hold			

==== District 67 ====
Incumbent Republican Justin Burr has represented the 67th District since 2009.

North Carolina House of Representatives 67th district general election, 2012
Party	Candidate	Votes	%
Republican	Justin Burr (incumbent)	22,911	62.58%
Democratic	Kevin Furr	13,700	37.42%
Total votes		36,611	100%
Republican hold			

==== District 68 ====
Incumbent Republican Craig Horn has represented the 68th District since 2011.

North Carolina House of Representatives 68th district general election, 2012
Party	Candidate	Votes	%
Republican	Craig Horn (incumbent)	22,811	65.15%
Democratic	Kenneth J. Baker	12,200	34.85%
Total votes		35,011	100%
Republican hold			

==== District 69 ====
The new 69th district is based in Union County and is expected to favor Republicans. Republican Dean Arp won the open seat.

North Carolina House of Representatives 69th district general election, 2012
Party	Candidate	Votes	%
Republican	Dean Arp	23,458	100%
Total votes		23,458	100%
Republican win (new seat)			

==== District 70 ====
Incumbent Republican Pat Hurley has represented the 70th District since 2007.

North Carolina House of Representatives 70th district general election, 2012
Party	Candidate	Votes	%
Republican	Pat Hurley (incumbent)	24,642	100%
Total votes		24,642	100%
Republican hold			

==== District 71 ====
Incumbent Democrat Larry Womble has represented the 71st District and its predecessors since 1995. Womble didn't seek re-election and Democrat Evelyn Terry won the open seat.

North Carolina House of Representatives 71st district general election, 2012
Party	Candidate	Votes	%
Democratic	Evelyn Terry	23,545	77.94%
Republican	Kris McCann	6,664	22.06%
Total votes		30,209	100%
Democratic hold			

==== District 72 ====
Incumbent Democrat Earline Parmon has represented the 72nd District since 2003. Parmon ran for the State Senate. Democrat Ed Hanes won the open seat.

North Carolina House of Representatives 72nd district general election, 2012
Party	Candidate	Votes	%
Democratic	Ed Hanes	26,561	74.36%
Republican	Charlie Mellies	9,158	25.64%
Total votes		35,719	100%
Democratic hold			

==== District 73 ====
The new 73rd district contains all of Alexander and Yadkin counties as well as a southeastern portion of Wilkes County. The new district includes the homes of incumbent Republicans Darrell McCormick, who has represented the 92nd district since 2009, and Mark Hollo, who has represented the 88th District since 2011. Hollo defeated McCormick in the Republican primary and easily won the general election.

North Carolina House of Representatives 73rd district general election, 2012
Party	Candidate	Votes	%
Republican	Mark Hollo (incumbent)	24,076	71.37%
Democratic	William Stinson	9,659	28.63%
Total votes		33,735	100%
Republican hold			

==== District 74 ====
The new 74th district continues to be based in Forsyth County but has been pushed further to the south and to the east. The new district continues to favor Republicans. Incumbent Republican Dale Folwell, who has represented the 74th District since 2005, sought the Republican nomination for Lieutenant Governor. Incumbent Republican Larry Brown, who has represented the 73rd district since 2005, sought re-election here. Brown was defeated by Debra Conrad in the Republican primary. Conrad won the open seat.

North Carolina House of Representatives 74th district general election, 2012
Party	Candidate	Votes	%
Republican	Debra Conrad	26,616	64.36%
Democratic	David W. Moore	14,742	35.64%
Total votes		41,358	100%
Republican hold			

==== District 75 ====
Incumbent Republican William McGee has represented the 75th District and its predecessors since 1990. McGee didn't seek re-election. Republican Donny Lambeth won the open seat.

North Carolina House of Representatives 75th district general election, 2012
Party	Candidate	Votes	%
Republican	Donny Lambeth	29,073	100%
Total votes		29,073	100%
Republican hold			

==== District 76 ====
Incumbent Republican Fred Steen II has represented the 76th District since 2004. Steen sought the Republican nomination for U.S House NC District 8. Republican Carl Ford won the open seat.

North Carolina House of Representatives 76th district general election, 2012
Party	Candidate	Votes	%
Republican	Carl Ford	25,486	100%
Total votes		25,486	100%
Republican hold			

==== District 77 ====
Incumbent Republican Harry Warren has represented the 77th District since 2011.

North Carolina House of Representatives 77th district general election, 2012
Party	Candidate	Votes	%
Republican	Harry Warren (incumbent)	21,526	61.85%
Democratic	William H. Battermann	13,279	38.15%
Total votes		34,805	100%
Republican hold			

==== District 78 ====
Incumbent Republican Allen McNeill has represented the 78th District since his appointment in August 2012. McNeill was elected to first full term.

North Carolina House of Representatives 78th district general election, 2012
Party	Candidate	Votes	%
Republican	Allen McNeill (incumbent)	24,880	75.05%
Democratic	Gerald C. Parker	8,272	24.95%
Total votes		33,152	100%
Republican hold			

==== District 79 ====
Incumbent Republican Julia Craven Howard has represented the 79th District and its predecessors since 1989.

North Carolina House of Representatives 79th district general election, 2012
Party	Candidate	Votes	%
Republican	Julia Craven Howard (incumbent)	27,749	70.06%
Democratic	Cristina Victoria Vazquez	11,859	29.94%
Total votes		39,608	100%
Republican hold			

=== Districts 80-99 ===
==== District 80 ====
Incumbent Republican Jerry Dockham has represented the 80th district and its predecessors since 1991.

North Carolina House of Representatives 80th district general election, 2012
Party	Candidate	Votes	%
Republican	Jerry Dockham (incumbent)	24,080	68.63%
Democratic	Loretta M. Martin	11,009	31.37%
Total votes		35,089	100%
Republican hold			

==== District 81 ====
Incumbent Republican Rayne Brown has represented the 81st District since 2011.

North Carolina House of Representatives 81st district general election, 2012
Party	Candidate	Votes	%
Republican	Rayne Brown (incumbent)	25,775	100%
Total votes		25,775	100%
Republican hold			

==== District 82 ====
Incumbent Republican Larry Pittman has represented the 82nd District since 2011.

North Carolina House of Representatives 82nd district general election, 2012
Party	Candidate	Votes	%
Republican	Larry Pittman (incumbent)	24,674	100%
Total votes		24,674	100%
Republican hold			

==== District 83 ====
Incumbent Republican Linda Johnson has represented the 83rd District and its predecessors since 2001.

North Carolina House of Representatives 83rd district general election, 2012
Party	Candidate	Votes	%
Republican	Linda Johnson (incumbent)	21,219	63.22%
Democratic	Jerome Fleming	12,347	36.78%
Total votes		33,566	100%
Republican hold			

==== District 84 ====
The new 84th district is based in northern Iredell County and is expected to favor Republicans. Republican Rena Turner won the open seat.

North Carolina House of Representatives 84th district general election, 2012
Party	Candidate	Votes	%
Republican	Rena Turner	23,284	65.27%
Democratic	Gene Mitchell Mahaffey	12,388	34.73%
Total votes		35,672	100%
Republican win (new seat)			

==== District 85 ====
The new 85th district lost its share of Burke County but gained Avery and Mitchell counties. It includes the homes of Incumbent Republicans Mitch Gillespie, who has represented the 85th District since 1999, and Phillip Frye, who has represented the 84th district since 2003. Frye didn't seek re-election and Gillespie was re-elected here.

North Carolina House of Representatives 85th district general election, 2012
Party	Candidate	Votes	%
Republican	Mitch Gillespie (incumbent)	21,895	68.48%
Democratic	JR Edwards	10,077	31.52%
Total votes		31,972	100%
Republican hold			

==== District 86 ====
Incumbent Republican Hugh Blackwell has represented the 86th District since 2009.

North Carolina House of Representatives 86th district general election, 2012
Party	Candidate	Votes	%
Republican	Hugh Blackwell (incumbent)	19,537	60.82%
Democratic	Jim Cates	12,584	39.18%
Total votes		32,121	100%
Republican hold			

==== District 87 ====
Incumbent Republican Edgar Starnes has represented the 87th District and its predecessors since 1997.

North Carolina House of Representatives 87th district general election, 2012
Party	Candidate	Votes	%
Republican	Edgar Starnes (incumbent)	25,757	100%
Total votes		25,757	100%
Republican hold			

==== District 88 ====
The new 88th district overlaps with much of the former 106th district but has been drawn to be more Republican than its predecessor. Incumbent Democrat Martha Alexander, who has represented the 106th District and its predecessors since 1993, was defeated for re-election here by Republican Rob Bryan.

North Carolina House of Representatives 88th district general election, 2012
Party	Candidate	Votes	%
Republican	Rob Bryan	22,081	54.95%
Democratic	Martha Alexander (incumbent)	18,106	45.05%
Total votes		40,187	100%
Republican gain from Democratic			

==== District 89 ====
Incumbent Republican Mitchell Setzer has represented the 89th District and its predecessors since 1999.

North Carolina House of Representatives 89th district general election, 2012
Party	Candidate	Votes	%
Republican	Mitchell Setzer (incumbent)	25,735	100%
Total votes		25,735	100%
Republican hold			

==== District 90 ====
Incumbent Republican Sarah Stevens has represented the 90th District since 2009.

North Carolina House of Representatives 90th district general election, 2012
Party	Candidate	Votes	%
Republican	Sarah Stevens (incumbent)	23,153	100%
Total votes		23,153	100%
Republican hold			

==== District 91 ====
Incumbent Republican Bryan Holloway has represented the 91st District since 2005. Former representative Nelson Cole attempted to make a political comeback after being defeated by Bert Jones in the neighboring 65th district in 2010, but he was easily defeated by Holloway.

North Carolina House of Representatives 91st district general election, 2012
Party	Candidate	Votes	%
Republican	Bryan Holloway (incumbent)	22,417	61.00%
Democratic	Nelson Cole	14,334	39.00%
Total votes		36,751	100%
Republican hold			

==== District 92 ====
The new 92nd district is based in Mecklenburg County and isn't a safe seat for either party. Republican Charles Jeter won the open seat.

North Carolina House of Representatives 92nd district general election, 2012
Party	Candidate	Votes	%
Republican	Charles Jeter	18,843	51.40%
Democratic	Robin Bradford	17,820	48.60%
Total votes		36,663	100%
Republican win (new seat)			

==== District 93 ====
Incumbent Republican Jonathan Jordan has represented the 93rd District since 2011. Former representative Cullie Tarleton sought a rematch with Jordan, but lost again in a close race.

North Carolina House of Representatives 93rd district general election, 2012
Party	Candidate	Votes	%
Republican	Jonathan Jordan (incumbent)	20,003	51.52%
Democratic	Cullie Tarleton	18,820	48.48%
Total votes		38,823	100%
Republican hold			

==== District 94 ====
Incumbent Republican Shirley Randleman has represented the 94th District since 2009. Randleman ran for the State Senate to replace Don East who died in office. Republican Jeffrey Elmore won the open seat.

North Carolina House of Representatives 94th district general election, 2012
Party	Candidate	Votes	%
Republican	Jeffrey Elmore	23,601	100%
Total votes		23,601	100%
Republican hold			

==== District 95 ====
Incumbent Republican Grey Mills has represented the 95th District since 2009. Mills sought the Republican nomination for Lieutenant Governor. Republican Robert Brawley won the open seat.

North Carolina House of Representatives 95th district general election, 2012
Party	Candidate	Votes	%
Republican	Robert Brawley	27,856	94.84%
Independent	Barbara Orr (write-in)	1,310	4.46%
Write-in		207	0.70%
Total votes		29,373	100%
Republican hold			

==== District 96 ====
Incumbent Republican Mark Hilton has represented the 96th District and its predecessors since 2001. Hilton didn't seek re-election and Republican Andy Wells won the open seat.

North Carolina House of Representatives 96th district general election, 2012
Party	Candidate	Votes	%
Republican	Andy Wells	21,073	62.46%
Democratic	Cliff Moone	12,664	37.54%
Total votes		33,737	100%
Republican hold			

==== District 97 ====
Incumbent Republican Jason Saine has represented the 97th District since 2011.

North Carolina House of Representatives 97th district general election, 2012
Party	Candidate	Votes	%
Republican	Jason Saine (incumbent)	26,690	100%
Total votes		26,690	100%
Republican hold			

==== District 98 ====
Incumbent Republican Speaker of the House Thom Tillis has represented the 98th District since 2007.

North Carolina House of Representatives 98th district general election, 2012
Party	Candidate	Votes	%
Republican	Thom Tillis (incumbent)	27,971	100%
Total votes		27,971	100%
Republican hold			

==== District 99 ====
Incumbent Democrat Rodney Moore has represented the 99th District since 2011.

North Carolina House of Representatives 99th district general election, 2012
Party	Candidate	Votes	%
Democratic	Rodney Moore (incumbent)	28,282	100%
Total votes		28,282	100%
Democratic hold			

=== Districts 100-120 ===
==== District 100 ====
Incumbent Democrat Tricia Cotham has represented the 100th District since 2007.

North Carolina House of Representatives 100th district general election, 2012
Party	Candidate	Votes	%
Democratic	Tricia Cotham (incumbent)	24,217	100%
Total votes		24,217	100%
Democratic hold			

==== District 101 ====
Incumbent Democrat Beverley Earle has represented the 101st District and its predecessors since 1995.

North Carolina House of Representatives 101st district general election, 2012
Party	Candidate	Votes	%
Democratic	Beverly Earle (incumbent)	28,653	100%
Total votes		28,653	100%
Democratic hold			

==== District 102 ====
Incumbent Democrat Becky Carney has represented the 102nd District since 2003.

North Carolina House of Representatives 102nd district general election, 2012
Party	Candidate	Votes	%
Democratic	Becky Carney (incumbent)	26,802	100%
Total votes		26,802	100%
Democratic hold			

==== District 103 ====
Incumbent Republican Bill Brawley has represented the 103rd District since 2011.

North Carolina House of Representatives 103rd district general election, 2012
Party	Candidate	Votes	%
Republican	Bill Brawley (incumbent)	25,477	100%
Total votes		25,477	100%
Republican hold			

==== District 104 ====
Incumbent Republican Ruth Samuelson has represented the 104th District since 2007.

North Carolina House of Representatives 104th district general election, 2012
Party	Candidate	Votes	%
Republican	Ruth Samuelson (incumbent)	31,319	100%
Total votes		31,319	100%
Republican hold			

==== District 105 ====
Incumbent Republican Ric Killian has represented the 105th District since 2007. Killian didn't seek re-election as he ran for the U.S House. Republican Jacqueline Schaffer won the open seat.

North Carolina House of Representatives 105th district general election, 2012
Party	Candidate	Votes	%
Republican	Jacqueline Schaffer	27,028	100%
Total votes		27,028	100%
Republican hold			

==== District 106 ====
The new 106th District continues to be based in Mecklenburg County and is expected to favor Democrats. Democrat Carla Cunningham won the open seat.

North Carolina House of Representatives 106th district general election, 2012
Party	Candidate	Votes	%
Democratic	Carla Cunningham	26,577	100%
Total votes		26,577	100%
Democratic win (new seat)			

==== District 107 ====
Incumbent Democrat Kelly Alexander has represented the 107th District since 2009.

North Carolina House of Representatives 107th district general election, 2012
Party	Candidate	Votes	%
Democratic	Kelly Alexander (incumbent)	32,275	100%
Total votes		32,275	100%
Democratic hold			

==== District 108 ====
Incumbent Republican John Torbett has represented the 108th District since 2011.

North Carolina House of Representatives 108th district general election, 2012
Party	Candidate	Votes	%
Republican	John Torbett (incumbent)	21,933	100%
Total votes		21,933	100%
Republican hold			

==== District 109 ====
Incumbent Republican William Current has represented the 109th District since 2005. Current didn't seek re-election and Republican Dana Bumgardner won the open seat.

North Carolina House of Representatives 109th district general election, 2012
Party	Candidate	Votes	%
Republican	Dana Bumgardner	19,772	59.22%
Democratic	Dodie Reese	13,618	40.78%
Total votes		33,390	100%
Republican hold			

==== District 110 ====
Incumbent Republican Kelly Hastings has represented the 110th District since 2011.

North Carolina House of Representatives 110th district general election, 2012
Party	Candidate	Votes	%
Republican	Kelly Hastings (incumbent)	20,236	63.80%
Democratic	Jamar McKoy	10,465	33.00%
Libertarian	Lewis B. Guignard Jr.	1,015	3.20%
Total votes		31,716	100%
Republican hold			

==== District 111 ====
Incumbent Republican Tim Moore has represented the 111th District since 2003.

North Carolina House of Representatives 110th district general election, 2012
Party	Candidate	Votes	%
Republican	Tim Moore (incumbent)	22,441	100%
Total votes		22,441	100%
Republican hold			

==== District 112 ====
Incumbent Republican Mike Hager has represented the 112th District since 2011.

North Carolina House of Representatives 112th district general election, 2012
Party	Candidate	Votes	%
Republican	Mike Hager (incumbent)	19,593	61.90%
Democratic	Mark Brown	12,059	38.10%
Total votes		31,652	100%
Republican hold			

==== District 113 ====
Incumbent Republican Trudi Walend has represented the 113th District since her appointment in 2012. Walend ran for a full term, but she lost re-nomination to fellow Republican Chris Whitmire. Whitmire easily won the general election.

North Carolina House of Representatives 113th district general election, 2012
Party	Candidate	Votes	%
Republican	Chris Whitmire	25,663	63.03%
Democratic	George Alley	15,055	36.97%
Total votes		40,718	100%
Republican hold			

==== District 114 ====
Incumbent Democrat Susan Fisher has represented the 114th District since 2004.

North Carolina House of Representatives 114th district general election, 2012
Party	Candidate	Votes	%
Democratic	Susan Fisher (incumbent)	34,719	100%
Total votes		34,719	100%
Democratic hold			

==== District 115 ====
Incumbent Democrat Patsy Keever has represented the 115th District since 2010. Keever ran for the U.S House. Republican Nathan Ramsey won the open seat.

North Carolina House of Representatives 115th district general election, 2012
Party	Candidate	Votes	%
Republican	Nathan Ramsey	23,118	54.32%
Democratic	Susan E. Wilson	19,438	45.68%
Total votes		42,556	100%
Republican gain from Democratic			

==== District 116 ====
Incumbent Republican Tim Moffitt has represented the 116th District since 2011. Former representative Jane Whilden sought a rematch with Moffitt but she was defeated again.

North Carolina House of Representatives 116th district general election, 2012
Party	Candidate	Votes	%
Republican	Tim Moffitt (incumbent)	21,291	56.31%
Democratic	Jane Whilden	16,519	43.69%
Total votes		37,810	100%
Republican hold			

==== District 117 ====
Incumbent Republican Chuck McGrady has represented the 117th District since 2011.

North Carolina House of Representatives 117th district general election, 2012
Party	Candidate	Votes	%
Republican	Chuck McGrady (incumbent)	26,217	100%
Total votes		26,217	100%
Republican hold			

==== District 118 ====
Incumbent Democrat Ray Rapp has represented the 118th District since 2003. Rapp lost re-election to Republican Michele Presnell.

North Carolina House of Representatives 118th district general election, 2012
Party	Candidate	Votes	%
Republican	Michele Presnell	18,749	51.32%
Democratic	Ray Rapp (incumbent)	17,788	48.68%
Total votes		36,537	100%
Republican gain from Democratic			

==== District 119 ====
Incumbent Democrat Phil Haire has represented the 119th District and its predecessors since 1999. Haire didn't seek re-election and former Democratic state senator Joe Queen won the open seat.

North Carolina House of Representatives 119th district general election, 2012
Party	Candidate	Votes	%
Democratic	Joe Sam Queen	16,679	51.73%
Republican	Mike Clampitt	15,562	48.27%
Total votes		32,241	100%
Democratic hold			

==== District 120 ====
Incumbent Republican Roger West has represented the 120th District and its predecessors since 2000.

North Carolina House of Representatives 120th district general election, 2012
Party	Candidate	Votes	%
Republican	Roger West (incumbent)	28,903	100%
Total votes		28,903	100%
Republican hold			

== See also ==
- List of North Carolina state legislatures
