= Pryor A. Gibson III =

American politician

Pryor Allan Gibson III
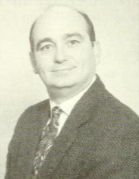
- Gibson in the 1999 legislative manual

Member of the North Carolina House of Representatives
- In office January 1, 1999 – March 3, 2011
- Preceded by: Foyle Robert Hightower Jr.
- Succeeded by: Frank McGuirt
- Constituency: 33rd District (1999-2003); 69th District (2003-2011)
- In office January 1, 1989 – January 1, 1991
- Preceded by: Foyle Robert Hightower Jr.
- Succeeded by: Foyle Robert Hightower Jr.
- Constituency: 33rd District

Personal details
- Born: October 12, 1957 (age 68) Forsyth County, North Carolina, U.S.
- Party: Democratic
- Occupation: Businessman

Pryor Allan Gibson III (born October 12, 1957) is an American politician in North Carolina. He served as a Democratic member of the North Carolina House of Representatives representing the state's sixty-ninth House district, including constituents in Anson, Montgomery and Union counties. A businessman from Wadesboro, North Carolina, Gibson was serving in his eighth term in the state House when, in 2011, he announced he would resign to become Gov. Bev Perdue's senior adviser for governmental affairs.

In 2020, he was appointed as Assistant Secretary of the North Carolina Department of Commerce to lead its Division of Employment Security.

== Electoral history ==
=== 2010 ===
North Carolina House of Representatives 69th district general election, 2010
Party	Candidate	Votes	%
Democratic	Pryor Gibson (incumbent)	10,302	60.20%
Republican	John L. Barker	6,810	39.80%
Total votes		17,112	100%
Democratic hold			

=== 2008 ===
North Carolina House of Representatives 69th district general election, 2008
Party	Candidate	Votes	%
Democratic	Pryor Gibson (incumbent)	18,489	65.71%
Republican	John L. Barker	9,648	34.29%
Total votes		28,137	100%
Democratic hold			

=== 2006 ===
North Carolina House of Representatives 69th district general election, 2006
Party	Candidate	Votes	%
Democratic	Pryor Gibson (incumbent)	8,616	66.66%
Republican	Jim H. Bention Sr.	4,309	33.34%
Total votes		12,925	100%
Democratic hold			

=== 2004 ===
North Carolina House of Representatives 69th district Democratic primary election, 2004
Party	Candidate	Votes	%
Democratic	Pryor Gibson (incumbent)	4,224	65.13%
Democratic	Ken Honeycutt	2,261	34.87%
Total votes		6,485	100%

North Carolina House of Representatives 69th district general election, 2004
Party	Candidate	Votes	%
Democratic	Pryor Gibson (incumbent)	14,139	63.44%
Republican	Hilda L. Morton	8,147	36.56%
Total votes		22,286	100%
Democratic hold			

=== 2002 ===
North Carolina House of Representatives 69th district general election, 2002
Party	Candidate	Votes	%
Democratic	Pryor Gibson (incumbent)	11,749	64.75%
Republican	Frank D. Hill	6,064	33.42%
Libertarian	Alan Light	332	1.83%
Total votes		18,145	100%
Democratic hold			

=== 2000 ===
North Carolina House of Representatives 33rd district general election, 2000
Party	Candidate	Votes	%
Democratic	Pryor Gibson (incumbent)	14,621	100%
Total votes		14,621	100%
Democratic hold			

North Carolina House of Representatives
Preceded by Foyle Robert Hightower Jr.	Member of the North Carolina House of Representatives from the 33rd district 1989–1991	Succeeded by Foyle Robert Hightower Jr.
Preceded by Foyle Robert Hightower Jr.	Member of the North Carolina House of Representatives from the 33rd district 1999–2003	Succeeded by Bernard Allen
Preceded by Jim Gulley	Member of the North Carolina House of Representatives from the 69th district 2003–2011	Succeeded by Frank McGuirt
