= Bernard Allen (American politician) =

American politician from North Carolina

Member of the North Carolina House of Representatives from the 33rd district
- In office January 1, 2003 – October 14, 2006
- Preceded by: Dan Blue (Redistricting)
- Succeeded by: Dan Blue

Personal details
- Born: August 24, 1937
- Died: October 14, 2006 (aged 69) Raleigh, North Carolina, U.S.
- Party: Democratic
- Spouse: Vivian (Sneed) Allen
- Children: 2
- Education: St. Augustine's College (BA); North Carolina Central University (MA)
- Occupation: Educator, lobbyist

Bernard Allen (August 24, 1937 – October 14, 2006) was a Democratic member of the North Carolina General Assembly representing the state's thirty-third House district, predominantly composed of constituents in Raleigh, North Carolina but including some suburban areas of Wake County.

== Early life and education ==
Allen was born on August 24, 1937, and grew up in Allendale, South Carolina. His parents were James Allen, Sr., and the former Louise Hoover. Allen attended Voorhees College for a while, then transferred to St. Augustine's College in Raleigh where, in 1962, he earned his bachelor's degree in secondary education. He later earned his master's degree in public administration from North Carolina Central University in 1979.

== Career ==
After getting his bachelor's degree, Allen taught in the Vance County Schools system, eventually working his way into the system's administration. He worked for 25 years as a lobbyist for the North Carolina Association of Educators and for the North Carolina Secretary of State.

== Death ==
He suffered a mild stroke on September 23, 2006, and spent several weeks recuperating at WakeMed. Friends and family said he kept working from his bed until his very last hours. Allen died on October 14, 2006, aged 69.

Allen lived in Raleigh and was married to the former Vivian Sneed. They had two sons.

== Legislative history ==
During his term in office, Allen was noted for being one of the primary co-sponsors of the law establishing the North Carolina Education Lottery. He also worked to increase state funding to historically black colleges and universities in the state.

== Electoral history ==
=== 2002 ===
In 2002, the incumbent for the North Carolina House district 33 was Dan Blue. He decided not to run for re-election, instead choosing to run for the open United States Senate seat. Allen chose to run for the seat and did not face any Democratic party primary. He went on to win the general election over Republican Venita Peyton and Libertarian Jesse Halliday.

North Carolina House District 33 General Election 2002
Party	Candidate	Votes	%
Democratic	Bernard Allen	12,940	65.88%
Republican	Venita Peyton	6,175	31.44%
Libertarian	Jesse Halliday	526	2.68%
Total votes		19,641	100.00

=== 2004 ===
Allen again faced no Democratic primary in 2004 and went on to defeat Libertarian candidate Steven Hilton in the general election.

North Carolina House District 33 General Election 2004
Party	Candidate	Votes	%
Democratic	Bernard Allen	24,580	92.21%
Libertarian	Steven Hilton	2,076	7.79%
Total votes		26,656	100.00

=== 2006 ===
When he died, Allen was serving in his second term in the state House, and was seeking election to a third. He ran unopposed in the 2006 Democratic primary and was unopposed in the general election. Since it was too close to election date for the ballots to be reprinted, Allen's name still appeared on the general election ballot. The former holder of the seat, Dan Blue, was chosen to fill the position.

North Carolina House of Representatives
Preceded by Pryor Gibson	Member of the North Carolina House of Representatives from the 33rd district 2003–2006	Succeeded by Dan Blue
