= Monika Johnson-Hostler =

American politician

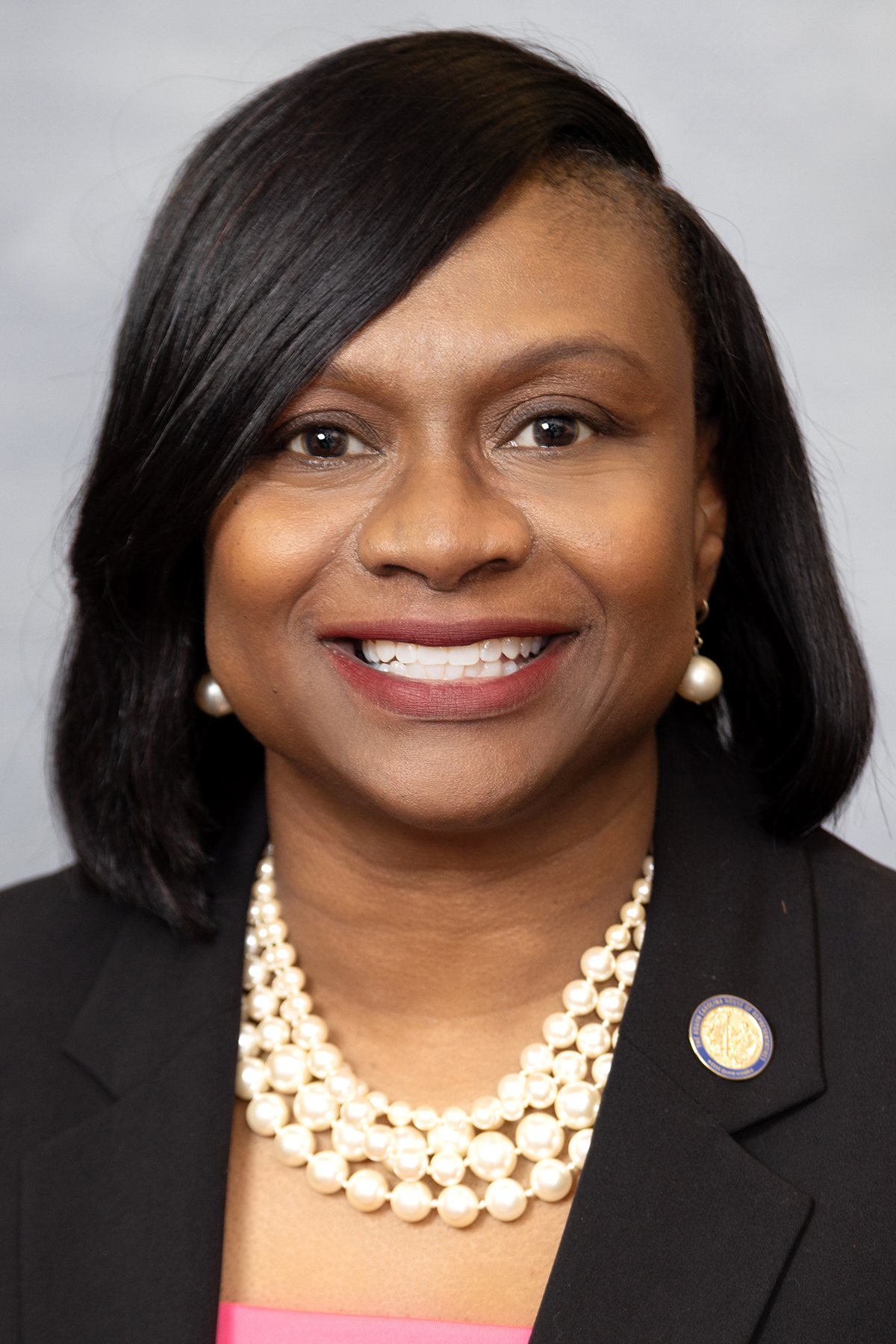

Member of the North Carolina House of Representatives from the 33rd district
- Incumbent
- Assumed office January 1, 2025
- Preceded by: Rosa Gill

Member of the Wake County Board of Education from the 2nd district
- In office 2013–2025
- Preceded by: John Tedesco
- Succeeded by: Christina Gordon

Personal details
- Born: Thomasville, North Carolina, U.S.
- Party: Democratic
- Education: Fayetteville State University (BS); North Carolina Central University (MPA)
- Website: NC House Webpage

Monika Johnson-Hostler is a Democratic member of the North Carolina House of Representatives. She has represented the 33rd district (including constituents in east central Wake County) since 2025. Johnson-Hostler also served on the Wake County Board of Education from 2013 to 2025 and ran unsuccessfully for Congress in 2020.

== Career ==
Johnson-Hostler currently serves as the Executive Director of the North Carolina coalition against sexual assault.

== Committee Assignments ==
=== 2025-2026 Session ===
- Appropriations
- Appropriations - Education
- Emergency Management and Disaster Recovery
- Higher Education

== Electoral history ==
=== 2024 ===
North Carolina House of Representatives 33rd district Democratic primary election, 2024
Party	Candidate	Votes	%
Democratic	Monika Johnson-Hostler	5,282	60.03%
Democratic	Antoine Marshall	2,269	25.79%
Democratic	Debra Dunston	1,248	14.18%
Total votes		8,799	100%

North Carolina House of Representatives 33rd district general election, 2024
Party	Candidate	Votes	%
Democratic	Monika Johnson-Hostler	33,771	80.19%
Libertarian	Chris Costello	8,343	19.81%
Total votes		42,114	100%
Democratic hold			

=== 2022 ===
Wake County Board of Education 2nd district general election, 2022
Party	Candidate	Votes	%
Nonpartisan	Monika Johnson-Hostler (incumbent)	20,092	45.25%
Nonpartisan	Monica Ruiz	19,287	43.44%
Nonpartisan	Dorian Hamilton	4,700	10.59%
Write-in		322	0.73%
Total votes		44,401	100%

=== 2020 ===
North Carolina's 2nd congressional district Democratic primary election, 2020
Party	Candidate	Votes	%
Democratic	Deborah Ross	103,574	69.85%
Democratic	Monika Johnson-Hostler	33,369	22.50%
Democratic	Andy Terrell	8,666	5.84%
Democratic	Ollie O'Neal Nelson	2,677	1.81%
Total votes		148,286	100%

Wake County Board of Education 2nd district general election, 2020
Party	Candidate	Votes	%
Nonpartisan	Monika Johnson-Hostler (incumbent)	29,685	50.99%
Nonpartisan	Gregory Hahn	19,721	33.87%
Nonpartisan	Dorian Hamilton	7,990	13.72%
Write-in		821	1.41%
Total votes		58,217	100%

=== 2018 ===
Wake County Board of Education 2nd district general election, 2018
Party	Candidate	Votes	%
Nonpartisan	Monika Johnson-Hostler (incumbent)	27,114	95.12%
Write-in		1,325	4.65%
Nonpartisan	John Tedesco (write-in)	30	0.11%
Nonpartisan	Brandi Kraus (write-in)	16	0.06%
Nonpartisan	Heath Early (write-in)	12	0.04%
Nonpartisan	Peter Hochstaetter (write-in)	9	0.03%
Total votes		28,506	100%

=== 2016 ===
Wake County Board of Education 2nd district general election, 2016
Party	Candidate	Votes	%
Nonpartisan	Monika Johnson-Hostler (incumbent)	21,151	46.66%
Nonpartisan	Peter Hochstaetter	16,780	37.02%
Nonpartisan	Mark Ivey	7,191	15.86%
Write-in		202	0.45%
Nonpartisan	Bill Fletcher (write-in)	5	0.01%
Total votes		45,329	100%

=== 2013 ===
Wake County Board of Education 2nd district general election, 2013
Party	Candidate	Votes	%
Nonpartisan	Monika Johnson-Hostler	5,019	53.72%
Nonpartisan	Matt Scruggs	4,286	45.87%
Write-in		38	0.41%
Total votes		9,343	100%

North Carolina House of Representatives
Preceded by Rosa Gill	Member of the North Carolina House of Representatives from the 33rd district 2025–Present	Incumbent
