= Mark Pless =

American politician

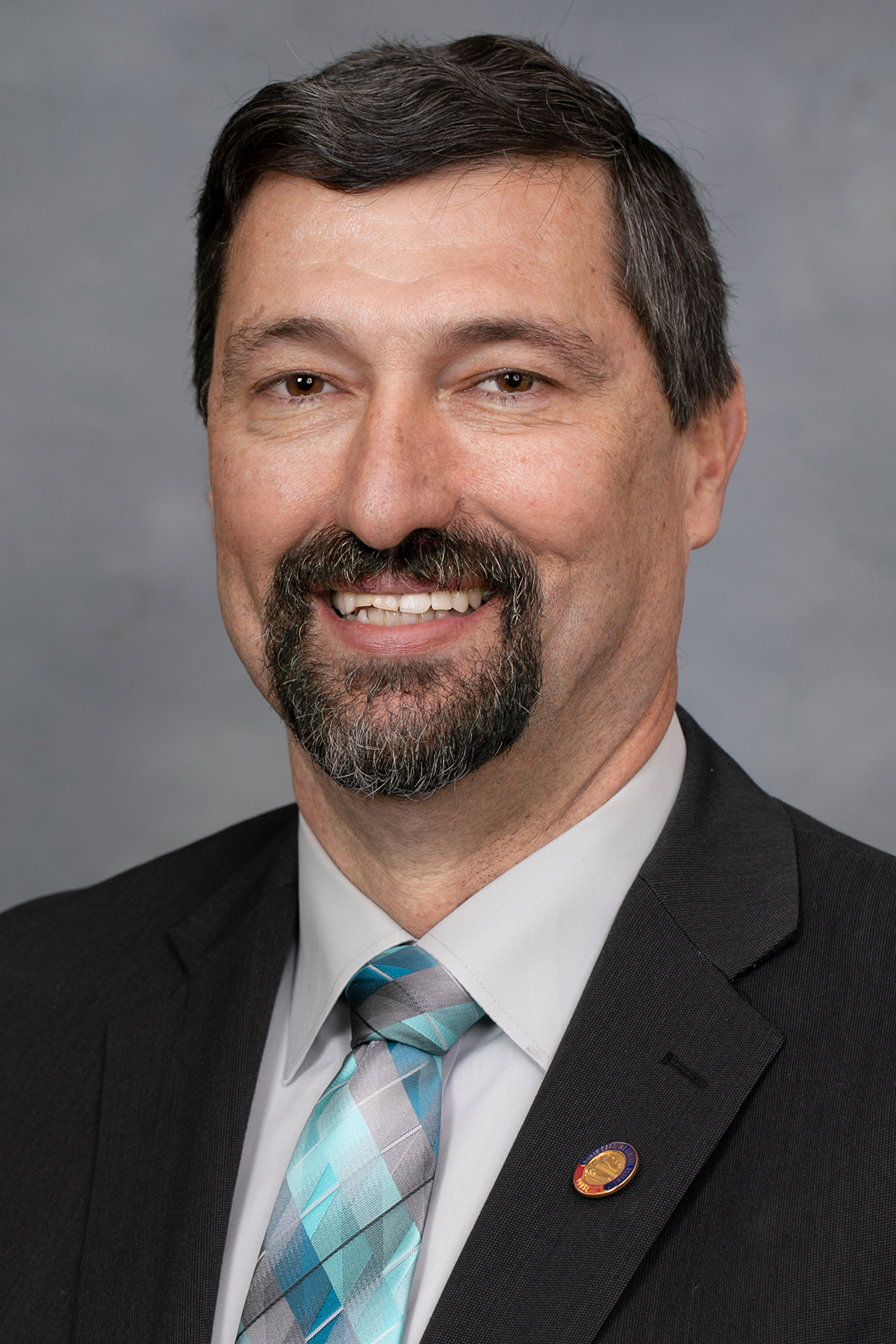
- Official portrait, 2021

Member of the North Carolina House of Representatives from the 118th district
- Incumbent
- Assumed office January 1, 2021
- Preceded by: Michele Presnell

Personal details
- Born: Steven Mark Pless Canton, North Carolina, U.S.
- Party: Republican
- Website: State House website

Steven Mark Pless is a Republican member of the North Carolina House of Representatives who has represented the 118th district (including all of Haywood, Madison, and Yancey counties) since 2021.

== Electoral history ==
North Carolina House of Representatives 118th district general election, 2020
Party	Candidate	Votes	%
Republican	Mark Pless	29,321	63.60%
Democratic	Alan Jones	16,782	36.40%
Total votes		46,103	100%
Republican hold			

== Committee assignments ==
=== 2021-2022 session ===
- Appropriations
- Federal Relations and American Indian Affairs - Vice Chair
- Homeland Security, Military and Veterans Affairs
- Subcommittee on Appropriations, Health and Human Services
- Transportation
- Wildlife Resources
