= Dan Blue =

American politician from North Carolina

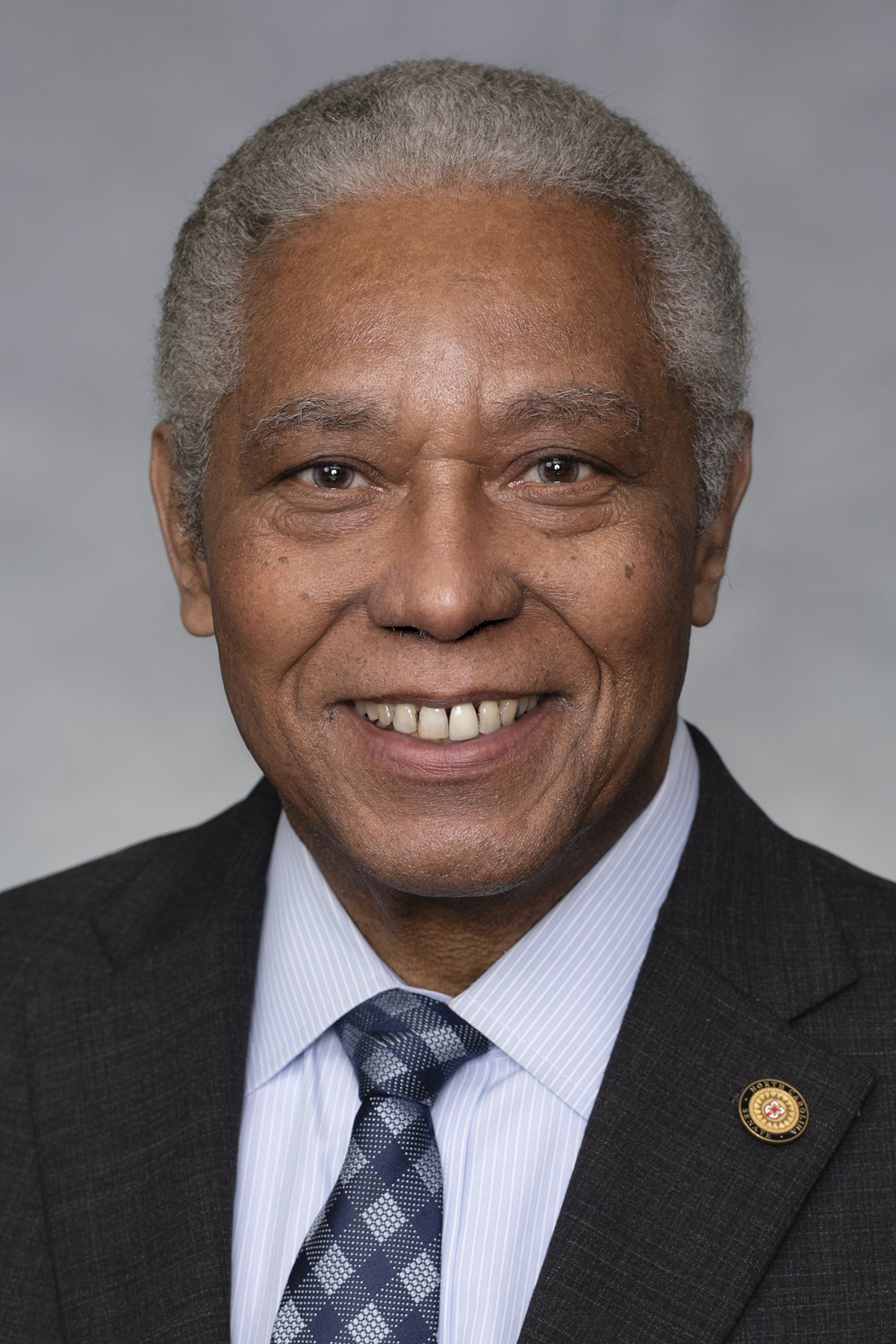

Minority Leader of the North Carolina Senate
- In office March 2, 2014 – January 1, 2025
- Preceded by: Martin Nesbitt
- Succeeded by: Sydney Batch

Member of the North Carolina Senate from the 14th district
- Incumbent
- Assumed office May 19, 2009
- Preceded by: Vernon Malone

President of the National Conference of State Legislatures
- In office 2017
- Preceded by: Michael Gronstal
- Succeeded by: Deb Peters
- In office 1998–1999
- Preceded by: Richard Finan
- Succeeded by: Paul Mannweiler

Speaker of the North Carolina House of Representatives
- In office January 1, 1991 – January 1, 1995
- Preceded by: Josephus Mavretic
- Succeeded by: Harold Brubaker

Member of the North Carolina House of Representatives
- In office November 2, 2006 – May 19, 2009
- Preceded by: Bernard Allen
- Succeeded by: Rosa Gill
- Constituency: 33rd district
- In office January 1, 1981 – January 1, 2003
- Preceded by: William Creech; Robert Farmer; William Holroyd; Joseph Johnson
- Succeeded by: Bernard Allen (redistricted)
- Constituency: 15th district (1981–1983); 21st district (1983–2003)

Personal details
- Born: Daniel Terry Blue Jr. April 18, 1949 (age 77) Lumberton, North Carolina, U.S.
- Party: Democratic
- Spouse: Edna
- Education: North Carolina Central University (AB); Duke University (JD)

Daniel Terry Blue Jr. (born April 18, 1949) is an American politician and attorney serving as a member of the North Carolina Senate, representing the state's 14th Senate district, and was the Senate minority leader.

== Early life and education ==
Blue graduated from North Carolina Central University and the Duke University School of Law, establishing a law practice in Raleigh, North Carolina. He is a member of Alpha Phi Alpha fraternity.

== Career ==
=== North Carolina House ===
Blue served in the North Carolina House of Representatives from 1981 through 2002 and from 2006 through his 2009 Senate appointment, representing a portion of the state capital, Raleigh.

Blue was the Speaker of the North Carolina House of Representatives from 1991 until 1994, when the Democrats lost control of the House to Republicans. Blue was the first—and to date, only--African American to hold the post of Speaker in North Carolina.

From 1998 to 1999, Blue served as the first African-American President of the National Conference of State Legislatures.

He sought unsuccessfully to regain his position as Speaker when the Democrats got back the majority in 1999, by forming a coalition of Democrats and Republicans that fell two votes shy of a majority. Blue remained in the House until he ran in the Democratic primary for U.S. Senate in 2002, in which he came in second place behind nominee Erskine Bowles and ahead of Secretary of State Elaine Marshall.

He was selected by his local Democratic Party to return to what was essentially his former seat in the North Carolina House of Representatives, after his successor, Bernard Allen, died while running unopposed in the November 2006 election. Democrats also voted to allow Allen's votes in the election to go toward Blue.

Governor Mike Easley, obligated to accept the nomination of the party, appointed Blue to the legislature on November 2, 2006. He served the remaining months of Allen's term and then took his seat for a full term in January 2007.

=== North Carolina Senate ===
In 2009, Blue was selected by local Democrats to take the place of Sen. Vernon Malone, who died in office. He joined the Senate on May 19, 2009. In 2014, Blue was elected Senate minority leader by his Democratic colleagues when Sen. Martin L. Nesbitt had to step down abruptly due to health issues. Blue was elected to a full term as minority leader after the 2014 elections.

In 2017, Blue again served as president of the National Conference of State Legislatures.

=== Other work ===
Blue serves on Duke University's board of trustees and was elected chairman in 2009. He was the first African American to chair Duke's board.

After leaving the North Carolina House of Representatives, Blue returned to his private law practice and was hired as a lobbyist for cities on energy issues.

== Personal life ==
Blue and his wife, Edna, have three children. His daughter Kanika, is a law professor at Campbell Law School. Kanika is married to Jeff Capel III, a college basketball coach. Blue's son, Dan III, ran for North Carolina State Treasurer in the 2016 elections.

Political offices
Preceded by Josephus Mavretic	Speaker of the North Carolina House of Representatives; 1991–1995	Succeeded by Harold Brubaker
North Carolina Senate
Preceded by Martin Nesbitt	Minority Leader of the North Carolina Senate; 2014–2025	Succeeded by Sydney Batch
