= Frank McGuirt =

American politician

Member of the North Carolina House of Representatives from the 69th district
- In office March 7, 2011 – January 1, 2013
- Preceded by: Pryor Gibson
- Succeeded by: Mark Brody (Redistricting)

Personal details
- Party: Democratic

Frank McGuirt was a Democratic member of the North Carolina House of Representatives and a former sheriff of Union County, North Carolina.

McGuirt was appointed to the legislature in March 2011 to replace Rep. Pryor Gibson, who had resigned. He represents House District 69, which includes all of Anson County and part of Union County. His term ended January 1, 2013.

McGuirt served as sheriff of Union County from 1979 to 2002 when he retired. He then opened McGuirt Advertising a promotional products dealership. He was also a licensed private investigator, associated with Allen's Professional Investigations. Prior to becoming sheriff he was a deputy sheriff under Sheriff Shelly Griffin and Frank Fowler, rising to rank of lieutenant. McGuirt was a crime scene investigator and fingerprint technician. Prior to the sheriff's office he was a Monroe City Firefighter for 3 years. McGuirt also operated a retail store specializing in phonograph records and photography. He also was a partner with David J. Pierce in Spring Printing, a commercial printing business in Monroe for several years.

Frank McGuirt was married to the former Jenny Ratliff of Anson County for 47 years until her death from heart disease October 6, 2024. They were the parents of two sons, William and Jonathan, both of whom reside in Wingate NC. Jonathan and his former wife, Christina, are the parents of Frank's granddaughter, Elizabeth Clair McGuirt. Jonathan and Christina divorced after 15 years. He is currently married to the former Jessica Elms of Polkton, NC.

While sheriff Frank McGuirt served as president of the NC Sheriffs' Association and was named Union County Man of the Year in 1995. He was recognized for his service to the community thriugh Rotary, Wingate Baptist Church, the Community Arts Council, United Way, Turning Point, which he helped found and is a Director Emeritus, Union County Crime Prevention and Crime Stoppers, both of which he helped found.

North Carolina House of Representatives
| Preceded by Pryor Gibson | Member of the North Carolina House of Representatives from the 69th district 2011–2013 | Succeeded by Dean Arp |
