= Dean Arp =

American politician from North Carolina

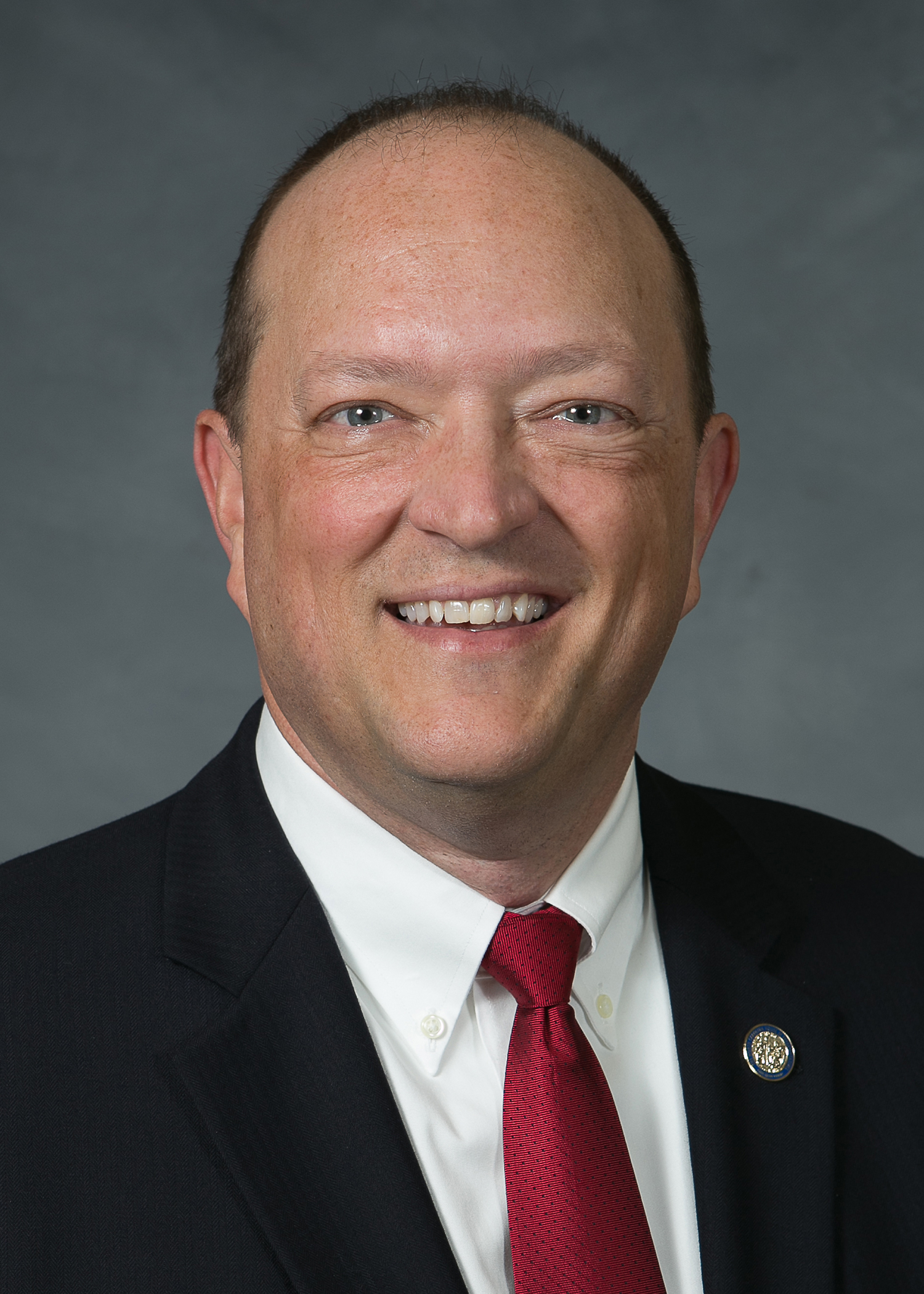

Member of the North Carolina House of Representatives from the 69th district
- Incumbent
- Assumed office January 1, 2013
- Preceded by: Constituency established

Personal details
- Born: Larry Dean Arp Jr. July 7, 1966 (age 60) Charlotte, North Carolina, U.S.
- Party: Republican
- Spouse: Anne
- Children: 2
- Education: The Citadel (BS); University of North Carolina at Charlotte (MS)

Larry Dean Arp, Jr. (born July 7, 1966) is a Republican member of the North Carolina House of Representatives. He has represented the 69th district (including constituents in Northwestern Union County) since 2013.

== Life and career ==
Arp earned a degree in civil engineering from The Citadel and a master of science in civil engineering from the University of North Carolina at Charlotte. He is a licensed professional engineer and structural engineer and the president of Arp Engineering in Monroe, North Carolina. He represents Union County, North Carolina, in the General Assembly.

In February 2025, Dean Arp saved the life of a North Carolina resident in Richmond County from a house fire. Representative Arp noticed a burning mobile home along U.S. Route 1. Arp went into the burning home and found an elderly woman stuck in a wheelchair unable to escape. Arp pulled the woman to safety; she was later identified as a 77-year-old cancer and stroke survivor named Esther. Arp contributed to a fundraiser for the continued financial and medical support of Esther following the fire and spoke of the unique bond they now share. His actions were honored by the United States House of Representatives by Congressmen Mark Harris and Tim Moore.

== Committee assignments ==
=== 2025-2026 session ===
- Appropriations (Senior Chair)
- Appropriations - Capital (Vice Chair)
- Energy and Public Utilities (Chair)
- Homeland Security, Military, and Veterans Affairs
- Judiciary I
- Oversight

=== 2023-2024 session ===
- Appropriations (Senior Chair)
- Appropriations - Capital (Vice Chair)
- Energy and Public Utilities (Chair)
- Homeland Security, Military, and Veteran Affairs
- Judiciary I
- Transportation
- Environment

=== 2021-2022 session ===
- Appropriations (Senior Chair)
- Appropriations - Capital (Vice Chair)
- Energy and Public Utilities (Chair)
- Homeland Security, Military, and Veterans Affairs
- Judiciary III
- Transportation

=== 2019-2020 session ===
- Appropriations (Chair)
- Appropriations - Capital Committee (Vice Chair)
- Appropriations - General Government (Vice Chair)
- Energy and Public Utilities (Chair)
- Homeland Security, Military, and Veterans Affairs
- Judiciary
- Transportation

=== 2017-2018 session ===
- Appropriations (Chair)
- Energy and Public Utilities (Chair)
- Homeland Security, Military, and Veterans Affairs
- Judiciary I
- Transportation
- Insurance

=== 2015-2016 session ===
- Appropriations (Vice Chair)
- Appropriations - Capital (Chair)
- Public Utilities (Chair)
- Homeland Security, Military, and Veterans Affairs
- Judiciary I
- Transportation
- Education - Community Colleges
- Insurance

=== 2013-2014 session ===
- Appropriations
- Public Utilities
- Judiciary
- Transportation
- Education

== Electoral history ==
=== 2024 ===
North Carolina House of Representatives 69th district general election, 2024
Party	Candidate	Votes	%
Republican	Dean Arp (incumbent)	32,796	63.21%
Democratic	Leigh Coulter	19,091	36.79%
Total votes		51,887	100%
Republican hold			

=== 2022 ===
North Carolina House of Representatives 69th district general election, 2022
Party	Candidate	Votes	%
Republican	Dean Arp (incumbent)	22,418	66.59%
Democratic	Leigh Coulter	11,249	33.41%
Total votes		33,667	100%
Republican hold			

=== 2020 ===
North Carolina House of Representatives 69th district general election, 2020
Party	Candidate	Votes	%
Republican	Dean Arp (incumbent)	27,981	64.94%
Democratic	Pam De Maria	15,106	35.06%
Total votes		43,087	100%
Republican hold			

=== 2018 ===
North Carolina House of Representatives 69th district general election, 2018
Party	Candidate	Votes	%
Republican	Dean Arp (incumbent)	18,029	60.27%
Democratic	Jennifer Benson	11,887	39.73%
Total votes		29,916	100%
Republican hold			

=== 2016 ===
North Carolina House of Representatives 69th district general election, 2016
Party	Candidate	Votes	%
Republican	Dean Arp (incumbent)	23,249	66.01%
Democratic	Gordon B. Daniels	11,970	33.99%
Total votes		35,219	100%
Republican hold			

=== 2014 ===
North Carolina House of Representatives 69th district general election, 2014
Party	Candidate	Votes	%
Republican	Dean Arp (incumbent)	13,973	100%
Total votes		13,973	100%
Republican hold			

=== 2012 ===
North Carolina House of Representatives 69th district Republican primary election, 2012
Party	Candidate	Votes	%
Republican	Dean Arp	5,340	65.96%
Republican	Jeff Gerber	2,756	34.04%
Total votes		8,096	100%

North Carolina House of Representatives 69th district general election, 2012
Party	Candidate	Votes	%
Republican	Dean Arp	23,458	100%
Total votes		23,458	100%
Republican win (new seat)			

North Carolina House of Representatives
Preceded by Frank McGuirt	Member of the North Carolina House of Representatives from the 69th district 2013-Present	Incumbent
