= North Carolina's 69th House district =

American legislative district

North Carolina's 69th State House of Representatives district
Representative
| Dean Arp; R–Monroe |
- Demographics: 72% White; 9% Black; 11% Hispanic; 3% Asian; 1% Other; 4% Multiracial
- Population (2024): 93,870

North Carolina's 69th House district is one of 120 districts in the North Carolina House of Representatives. It has been represented by Republican Dean Arp since 2013.

== Geography ==
Since 2013, the district has included part of Union County. The district overlaps with the 29th and 35th Senate districts.

== District officeholders ==
| Representative | Party | Dates | Notes | Counties |
|---|---|---|---|---|
District created January 1, 1985.
| George Miller Jr. (Durham) | Democratic | January 1, 1985 – January 1, 1989 | Redistricted from the 23rd district. Redistricted to the 23rd district. | 1985–1989; Part of Durham County. |
District abolished January 1, 1989.
District re-established January 1, 1993.
| J. Shawn Lemmond (Matthews) | Republican | January 1, 1993 – January 1, 1997 | | 1993–2003; Part of Mecklenburg County. |
| Jim Gulley (Matthews) | Republican | January 1, 1997 – January 1, 2003 | Redistricted to the 103rd district. | 1993–2003; Part of Mecklenburg County. |
| Pryor Gibson (Wadesboro) | Democratic | January 1, 2003 – March 3, 2011 | Redistricted from the 33rd district. Resigned. | 2003–2013; All of Anson County. Part of Union County. |
| Vacant | | March 3, 2011 – March 7, 2011 | | 2003–2013; All of Anson County. Part of Union County. |
| Frank McGuirt (Wingate) | Democratic | March 7, 2011 – January 1, 2013 | Appointed to finish Gibson's term. Redistricted to the 55th district and retired. | 2003–2013; All of Anson County. Part of Union County. |
| Dean Arp (Monroe) | Republican | January 1, 2013 – Present | | 2013–Present; Part of Union County. |

== Election results ==
=== 2024 ===
North Carolina House of Representatives 69th district Republican primary election, 2024
| Party | Candidate | Votes | % |
|---|---|---|---|
| Republican | Dean Arp (incumbent) | 8,041 | 80.74% |
| Republican | Clint Cannaday | 1,918 | 19.26% |
| Total votes | | 9,959 | 100% |

North Carolina House of Representatives 69th district general election, 2024
| Party | Candidate | Votes | % |
|---|---|---|---|
| Republican | Dean Arp (incumbent) | 32,796 | 63.21% |
| Democratic | Leigh Coulter | 19,091 | 36.79% |
| Total votes | | 51,887 | 100% |
| Republican hold | | | |

=== 2022 ===
North Carolina House of Representatives 69th district general election, 2022
| Party | Candidate | Votes | % |
|---|---|---|---|
| Republican | Dean Arp (incumbent) | 22,418 | 66.59% |
| Democratic | Leigh Coulter | 11,249 | 33.41% |
| Total votes | | 33,667 | 100% |
| Republican hold | | | |

=== 2020 ===
North Carolina House of Representatives 69th district general election, 2020
| Party | Candidate | Votes | % |
|---|---|---|---|
| Republican | Dean Arp (incumbent) | 27,981 | 64.94% |
| Democratic | Pam De Maria | 15,106 | 35.06% |
| Total votes | | 43,087 | 100% |
| Republican hold | | | |

=== 2018 ===
North Carolina House of Representatives 69th district general election, 2018
| Party | Candidate | Votes | % |
|---|---|---|---|
| Republican | Dean Arp (incumbent) | 18,029 | 60.27% |
| Democratic | Jennifer Benson | 11,887 | 39.73% |
| Total votes | | 29,916 | 100% |
| Republican hold | | | |

=== 2016 ===
North Carolina House of Representatives 69th district general election, 2016
| Party | Candidate | Votes | % |
|---|---|---|---|
| Republican | Dean Arp (incumbent) | 23,249 | 66.01% |
| Democratic | Gordon B. Daniels | 11,970 | 33.99% |
| Total votes | | 35,219 | 100% |
| Republican hold | | | |

=== 2014 ===
North Carolina House of Representatives 69th district general election, 2014
| Party | Candidate | Votes | % |
|---|---|---|---|
| Republican | Dean Arp (incumbent) | 13,973 | 100% |
| Total votes | | 13,973 | 100% |
| Republican hold | | | |

=== 2012 ===
North Carolina House of Representatives 69th district Republican primary election, 2012
| Party | Candidate | Votes | % |
|---|---|---|---|
| Republican | Dean Arp | 5,340 | 65.96% |
| Republican | Jeff Gerber | 2,756 | 34.04% |
| Total votes | | 8,096 | 100% |

North Carolina House of Representatives 69th district general election, 2012
| Party | Candidate | Votes | % |
|---|---|---|---|
| Republican | Dean Arp | 23,458 | 100% |
| Total votes | | 23,458 | 100% |
| Republican win (new seat) | | | |

=== 2010 ===
North Carolina House of Representatives 69th district general election, 2010
| Party | Candidate | Votes | % |
|---|---|---|---|
| Democratic | Pryor Gibson (incumbent) | 10,302 | 60.20% |
| Republican | John L. Barker | 6,810 | 39.80% |
| Total votes | | 17,112 | 100% |
| Democratic hold | | | |

=== 2008 ===
North Carolina House of Representatives 69th district general election, 2008
| Party | Candidate | Votes | % |
|---|---|---|---|
| Democratic | Pryor Gibson (incumbent) | 18,489 | 65.71% |
| Republican | John L. Barker | 9,648 | 34.29% |
| Total votes | | 28,137 | 100% |
| Democratic hold | | | |

=== 2006 ===
North Carolina House of Representatives 69th district general election, 2006
| Party | Candidate | Votes | % |
|---|---|---|---|
| Democratic | Pryor Gibson (incumbent) | 8,616 | 66.66% |
| Republican | Jim H. Bention Sr. | 4,309 | 33.34% |
| Total votes | | 12,925 | 100% |
| Democratic hold | | | |

=== 2004 ===
North Carolina House of Representatives 69th district Democratic primary election, 2004
| Party | Candidate | Votes | % |
|---|---|---|---|
| Democratic | Pryor Gibson (incumbent) | 4,224 | 65.13% |
| Democratic | Ken Honeycutt | 2,261 | 34.87% |
| Total votes | | 6,485 | 100% |

North Carolina House of Representatives 69th district general election, 2004
| Party | Candidate | Votes | % |
|---|---|---|---|
| Democratic | Pryor Gibson (incumbent) | 14,139 | 63.44% |
| Republican | Hilda L. Morton | 8,147 | 36.56% |
| Total votes | | 22,286 | 100% |
| Democratic hold | | | |

=== 2002 ===
North Carolina House of Representatives 69th district general election, 2002
| Party | Candidate | Votes | % |
|---|---|---|---|
| Democratic | Pryor Gibson (incumbent) | 11,749 | 64.75% |
| Republican | Frank D. Hill | 6,064 | 33.42% |
| Libertarian | Alan Light | 332 | 1.83% |
| Total votes | | 18,145 | 100% |
| Democratic hold | | | |

=== 2000 ===
North Carolina House of Representatives 69th district Republican primary election, 2000
| Party | Candidate | Votes | % |
|---|---|---|---|
| Republican | Jim Gulley (incumbent) | 2,282 | 56.70% |
| Republican | Debbie Ware | 1,743 | 43.30% |
| Total votes | | 4,025 | 100% |

North Carolina House of Representatives 69th district general election, 2000
| Party | Candidate | Votes | % |
|---|---|---|---|
| Republican | Jim Gulley (incumbent) | 26,404 | 90.79% |
| Libertarian | Dave Gable | 2,678 | 9.21% |
| Total votes | | 29,082 | 100% |
| Republican hold | | | |
