= Ray Rapp =

American politician

Member of the North Carolina House of Representatives from the 118th district
- In office January 1, 2003 – January 1, 2013
- Preceded by: Margaret Carpenter (Redistricting)
- Succeeded by: Michele Presnell

Mayor of Mars Hill, North Carolina
- In office 1997–2003
- Preceded by: Gordan Randolph
- Succeeded by: John L. Chandler

Personal details
- Born: February 11, 1945 (age 81)
- Party: Democratic
- Spouse: Dorothy Rapp
- Education: University of North Carolina
- Profession: Retired College Professor

Ray Rapp is a former Democratic member of the North Carolina General Assembly representing the state's one hundred eighteenth House district, including constituents in Haywood, Madison and Yancey counties. He served as Minority Whip. A college administrator from Mars Hill, North Carolina, Rapp servered four terms in the state House. Rapp is a former Mayor of the town of Mars Hill from 1997 to 2003.

North Carolina House of Representatives
Preceded by Constituency established	Member of the North Carolina House of Representatives from the 118th district 2003-2013	Succeeded by Michele Presnell
