= North Carolina's 33rd House district =

American legislative district

North Carolina's 33rd State House of Representatives district
Representative
Monika Johnson-Hostler; D–Raleigh
- Demographics: 36% White; 39% Black; 16% Hispanic; 3% Asian; 1% Other; 4% Multiracial
- Population (2024): 92,225

North Carolina's 33rd House district is one of 120 districts in the North Carolina House of Representatives. It has been represented by Democrat Monika Johnson-Hostler since 2025.

== Geography ==
Since 2003, the district has included part of Wake County. The district overlaps with the 13th, 14th, and 16th Senate districts.

== District officeholders ==
=== Multi-member district ===
Representative	Party	Dates	Notes	Representative	Party	Dates	Notes	Representative	Party	Dates	Notes	Counties
District created January 1, 1967.
Fred Mills Jr. (Wadesboro)	Democratic	January 1, 1967 – January 1, 1971		Richard Clark (Monroe)	Democratic	January 1, 1967 – January 1, 1973						1967–1973; All of Anson and Union counties.
Foyle Hightower Jr. (Wadesboro)	Democratic	January 1, 1971 – January 1, 1973	Redistricted to the 26th district.	Richard Clark (Monroe)	Democratic	January 1, 1967 – January 1, 1973						1967–1973; All of Anson and Union counties.
Dwight Quinn (Kannapolis)	Democratic	January 1, 1973 – January 1, 1983	Redistricted from the 35th district. Redistricted to the 34th district.	Art Thomas (Concord)	Democratic	January 1, 1973 – September 21, 1975	Died.	Frances Tomlin (Concord)	Republican	January 1, 1973 – January 1, 1975		1973–1983; All of Cabarrus and Union counties.
Dwight Quinn (Kannapolis)	Democratic	January 1, 1973 – January 1, 1983	Redistricted from the 35th district. Redistricted to the 34th district.	Art Thomas (Concord)	Democratic	January 1, 1973 – September 21, 1975	Died.	Aaron Plyler (Monroe)	Democratic	January 1, 1975 – January 1, 1983	Redistricted to the 34th district and retired to run for State Senate.	1973–1983; All of Cabarrus and Union counties.
Dwight Quinn (Kannapolis)	Democratic	January 1, 1973 – January 1, 1983	Redistricted from the 35th district. Redistricted to the 34th district.	Vacant		September 21, 1975 – October 29, 1975		Aaron Plyler (Monroe)	Democratic	January 1, 1975 – January 1, 1983	Redistricted to the 34th district and retired to run for State Senate.	1973–1983; All of Cabarrus and Union counties.
Dwight Quinn (Kannapolis)	Democratic	January 1, 1973 – January 1, 1983	Redistricted from the 35th district. Redistricted to the 34th district.	Betty Dorton Thomas (Concord)	Democratic	October 29, 1975 – January 1, 1983	Appointed to finish her husband's term. Redistricted to the 34th district.	Aaron Plyler (Monroe)	Democratic	January 1, 1975 – January 1, 1983	Redistricted to the 34th district and retired to run for State Senate.	1973–1983; All of Cabarrus and Union counties.

=== Single-member district ===
Representative	Party	Dates	Notes	Counties
Foyle Hightower Jr. (Wadesboro)	Democratic	January 1, 1983 – January 1, 1989	Redistricted from the 26th district.	1983–1993; All of Anson and Montgomery counties.
Pryor Gibson (Wadesboro)	Democratic	January 1, 1989 – January 1, 1991		1983–1993; All of Anson and Montgomery counties.
Foyle Hightower Jr. (Wadesboro)	Democratic	January 1, 1991 – January 1, 1999		1983–1993; All of Anson and Montgomery counties.
Foyle Hightower Jr. (Wadesboro)	Democratic	January 1, 1991 – January 1, 1999		1993–2003; All of Anson County. Parts of Stanly and Montgomery counties.
Pryor Gibson (Troy)	Democratic	January 1, 1999 – January 1, 2003	Redistricted to the 69th district.	1993–2003; All of Anson County. Parts of Stanly and Montgomery counties.
Bernard Allen (Raleigh)	Democratic	January 1, 2003 – October 14, 2006	Died and re-elected posthumously.	2003–Present; Part of Wake County.
Vacant		October 14, 2006 – November 2, 2006		2003–Present; Part of Wake County.
Dan Blue (Raleigh)	Democratic	November 2, 2006 – May 19, 2009	Appointed to finish Allen's term and to the next term. Resigned to assume seat in State Senate.	2003–Present; Part of Wake County.
Vacant		May 19, 2009 – June 18, 2009		2003–Present; Part of Wake County.
Rosa Gill (Raleigh)	Democratic	June 18, 2009 – January 1, 2025	Appointed to finish Blue's term. Retired.	2003–Present; Part of Wake County.
Monika Johnson-Hostler (Raleigh)	Democratic	January 1, 2025 – Present		2003–Present; Part of Wake County.

== Election results ==
=== 2024 ===
North Carolina House of Representatives 33rd district Democratic primary election, 2024
Party	Candidate	Votes	%
Democratic	Monika Johnson-Hostler	5,282	60.03%
Democratic	Antoine Marshall	2,269	25.79%
Democratic	Debra Dunston	1,248	14.18%
Total votes		8,799	100%

North Carolina House of Representatives 33rd district general election, 2024
Party	Candidate	Votes	%
Democratic	Monika Johnson-Hostler	33,771	80.19%
Libertarian	Chris Costello	8,343	19.81%
Total votes		42,114	100%
Democratic hold			

=== 2022 ===
North Carolina House of Representatives 33rd district Democratic primary election, 2022
Party	Candidate	Votes	%
Democratic	Rosa Gill (incumbent)	6,257	86.13%
Democratic	Nate Blanton	1,008	13.87%
Total votes		7,265	100%

North Carolina House of Representatives 33rd district general election, 2022
Party	Candidate	Votes	%
Democratic	Rosa Gill (incumbent)	19,471	59.60%
Republican	Stephanie Dingee	12,191	37.32%
Libertarian	Chris Costello	1,008	3.09%
Total votes		32,670	100%
Democratic hold			

=== 2020 ===
North Carolina House of Representatives 33rd district Democratic primary election, 2020
Party	Candidate	Votes	%
Democratic	Rosa Gill (incumbent)	10,028	66.07%
Democratic	Antoine Marshall	5,150	33.93%
Total votes		15,178	100%

North Carolina House of Representatives 33rd district general election, 2020
Party	Candidate	Votes	%
Democratic	Rosa Gill (incumbent)	33,194	70.76%
Republican	Frann Sarpolus	11,659	24.85%
Libertarian	Sammie Brooks	2,057	4.38%
Total votes		46,910	100%
Democratic hold			

=== 2018 ===
North Carolina House of Representatives 33rd district Democratic primary election, 2018
Party	Candidate	Votes	%
Democratic	Rosa Gill (incumbent)	3,514	60.22%
Democratic	Antoine Marshall	1,442	24.71%
Democratic	Shirley E. Hicks	879	15.06%
Total votes		5,835	100%

North Carolina House of Representatives 33rd district general election, 2018
Party	Candidate	Votes	%
Democratic	Rosa Gill (incumbent)	23,900	78.70%
Republican	Anne Murtha	6,468	21.30%
Total votes		30,368	100%
Democratic hold			

=== 2016 ===
North Carolina House of Representatives 33rd district Democratic primary election, 2016
Party	Candidate	Votes	%
Democratic	Rosa Gill (incumbent)	8,603	64.05%
Democratic	Shirley E. Hicks	3,097	23.06%
Democratic	Bernard Allen II	1,731	12.89%
Total votes		13,431	100%

North Carolina House of Representatives 33rd district general election, 2016
Party	Candidate	Votes	%
Democratic	Rosa Gill (incumbent)	33,094	100%
Total votes		33,094	100%
Democratic hold			

=== 2014 ===
North Carolina House of Representatives 33rd district general election, 2014
Party	Candidate	Votes	%
Democratic	Rosa Gill (incumbent)	18,552	87.27%
Republican	Perry Whitlock	2,707	12.73%
Total votes		21,259	100%
Democratic hold			

=== 2012 ===
North Carolina House of Representatives 33rd district Democratic primary election, 2012
Party	Candidate	Votes	%
Democratic	Rosa Gill (incumbent)	8,158	78.66%
Democratic	Bernard Allen II	2,213	21.34%
Total votes		10,371`	100%

North Carolina House of Representatives 33rd district general election, 2012
Party	Candidate	Votes	%
Democratic	Rosa Gill (incumbent)	31,386	100%
Total votes		31,386	100%
Democratic hold			

=== 2010 ===
North Carolina House of Representatives 33rd district Democratic primary election, 2010
Party	Candidate	Votes	%
Democratic	Rosa Gill (incumbent)	3,048	71.57%
Democratic	Bernard Allen II	1,133	26.60%
Democratic	Doctor K. Aal Anubia	78	1.83%
Total votes		4,259	100%

North Carolina House of Representatives 33rd district Republican primary election, 2010
Party	Candidate	Votes	%
Republican	Paul Terrell	590	66.59%
Republican	Susan Byrd Leventhal	296	33.41%
Total votes		886	100%

North Carolina House of Representatives 33rd district general election, 2010
Party	Candidate	Votes	%
Democratic	Rosa Gill (incumbent)	18,426	77.79%
Republican	Paul Terrell	5,262	22.21%
Total votes		23,688	100%
Democratic hold			

=== 2008 ===
North Carolina House of Representatives 33rd district general election, 2008
Party	Candidate	Votes	%
Democratic	Dan Blue (incumbent)	32,466	81.85%
Republican	Paul F. Terrell III	7,199	18.15%
Total votes		39,665	100%
Democratic hold			

=== 2006 ===
North Carolina House of Representatives 33rd district general election, 2006
Party	Candidate	Votes	%
Democratic	Bernard Allen (incumbent)	12,566	100%
Total votes		12,566	100%
Democratic hold			

=== 2004 ===
North Carolina House of Representatives 33rd district general election, 2004
Party	Candidate	Votes	%
Democratic	Bernard Allen (incumbent)	24,580	92.21%
Libertarian	Steven Hilton	2,076	7.79%
Total votes		26,656	100%
Democratic hold			

=== 2002 ===
North Carolina House of Representatives 33rd district general election, 2002
Party	Candidate	Votes	%
Democratic	Bernard Allen	12,940	65.88%
Republican	Venita Peyton	6,175	31.44%
Libertarian	Jesse Halliday	526	2.68%
Total votes		19,641	100%
Democratic hold			

=== 2000 ===
North Carolina House of Representatives 33rd district general election, 2000
Party	Candidate	Votes	%
Democratic	Pryor Gibson (incumbent)	14,621	100%
Total votes		14,621	100%
Democratic hold			
