= Rosa Gill =

American politician from North Carolina (born 1943)

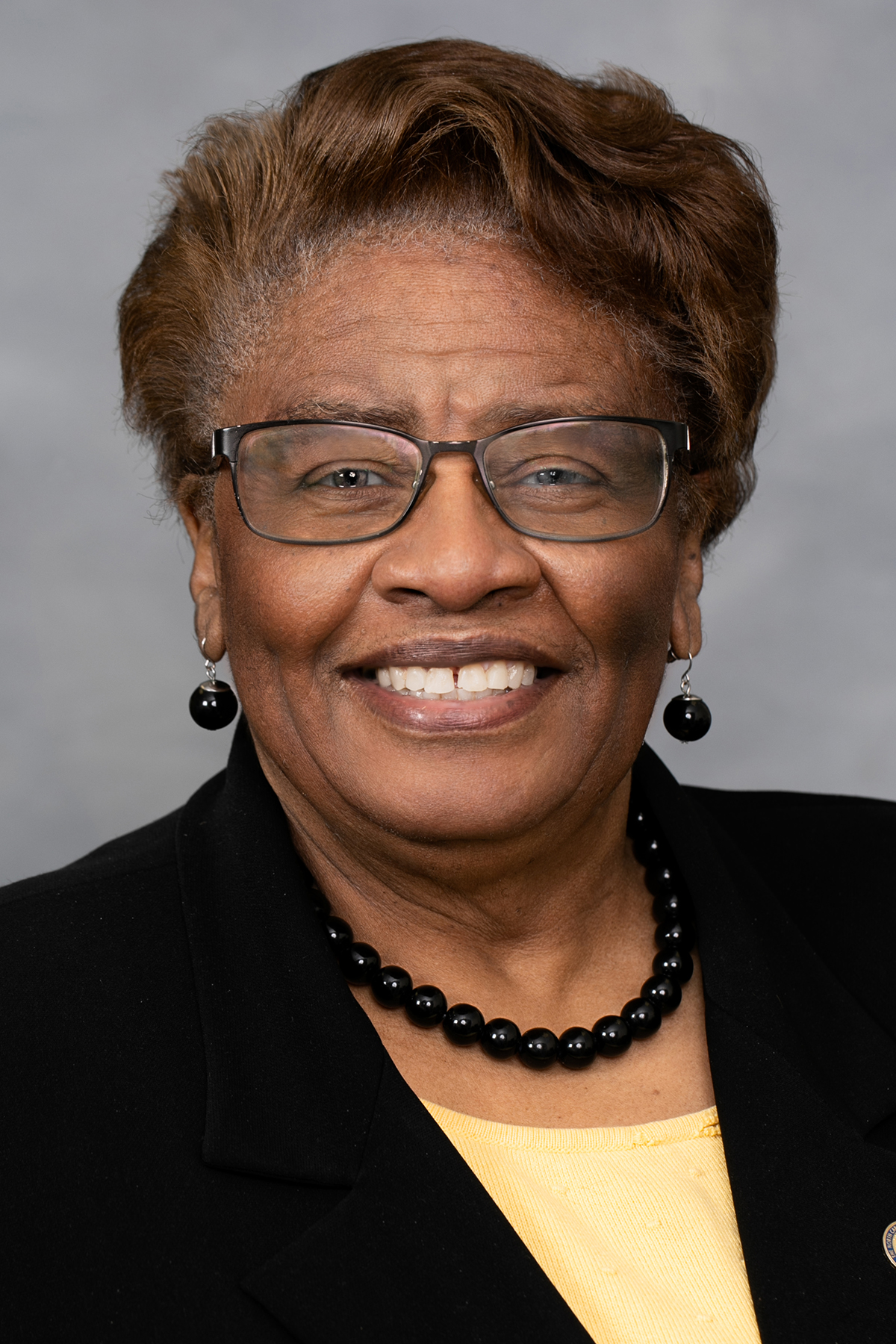

Member of the North Carolina House of Representatives from the 33rd district
- In office June 18, 2009 – January 1, 2025
- Preceded by: Dan Blue
- Succeeded by: Monika Johnson-Hostler

Personal details
- Born: June 5, 1943 (age 83) Apex, North Carolina, U.S.
- Party: Democratic
- Spouse: Jimmie
- Children: 2
- Education: Shaw University (BS)
- Occupation: educator

Rosa U. Gill (born June 5, 1943) is a Democratic former member of the North Carolina House of Representatives. She represented the 33rd district (including constituents in eastern Wake County) from her initial appointment in 2009 until 2025.

== Career ==
A longtime Wake County mathematics teacher, Gill ran unsuccessfully for the Wake County Board of Commissioners in 1988. She later was elected to the Wake County School Board, where she served from 1999 to 2009. Following the death of Senator Vernon Malone, then State Rep. Dan Blue was appointed to fill the balance of Malone's term in the Senate. Gill was then appointed to Blue's former House seat, where she has served since 2009. Gill has been re-elected to the seat a total of 7 times, most recently in 2022.

== Electoral history ==
=== 2022 ===
North Carolina House of Representatives 33rd district Democratic primary election, 2022
Party	Candidate	Votes	%
Democratic	Rosa Gill (incumbent)	6,257	86.13%
Democratic	Nate Blanton	1,008	13.87%
Total votes		7,265	100%

North Carolina House of Representatives 33rd district general election, 2022
Party	Candidate	Votes	%
Democratic	Rosa Gill (incumbent)	19,471	59.60%
Republican	Stephanie Dingee	12,191	37.32%
Libertarian	Chris Costello	1,008	3.09%
Total votes		32,670	100%
Democratic hold			

=== 2020 ===
North Carolina House of Representatives 33rd district Democratic primary election, 2020
Party	Candidate	Votes	%
Democratic	Rosa Gill (incumbent)	10,028	66.07%
Democratic	Antoine Marshall	5,150	33.93%
Total votes		15,178	100%

North Carolina House of Representatives 33rd district general election, 2020
Party	Candidate	Votes	%
Democratic	Rosa Gill (incumbent)	33,194	70.76%
Republican	Frann Sarpolus	11,659	24.85%
Libertarian	Sammie Brooks	2,057	4.38%
Total votes		46,910	100%
Democratic hold			

=== 2018 ===
North Carolina House of Representatives 33rd district Democratic primary election, 2018
Party	Candidate	Votes	%
Democratic	Rosa Gill (incumbent)	3,514	60.22%
Democratic	Antoine Marshall	1,442	24.71%
Democratic	Shirley E. Hicks	879	15.06%
Total votes		5,835	100%

North Carolina House of Representatives 33rd district general election, 2018
Party	Candidate	Votes	%
Democratic	Rosa Gill (incumbent)	23,900	78.70%
Republican	Anne Murtha	6,468	21.30%
Total votes		30,368	100%
Democratic hold			

=== 2016 ===
North Carolina House of Representatives 33rd district Democratic primary election, 2016
Party	Candidate	Votes	%
Democratic	Rosa Gill (incumbent)	8,603	64.05%
Democratic	Shirley E. Hicks	3,097	23.06%
Democratic	Bernard Allen II	1,731	12.89%
Total votes		13,431	100%

North Carolina House of Representatives 33rd district general election, 2016
Party	Candidate	Votes	%
Democratic	Rosa Gill (incumbent)	33,094	100%
Total votes		33,094	100%
Democratic hold			

=== 2014 ===
North Carolina House of Representatives 33rd district general election, 2014
Party	Candidate	Votes	%
Democratic	Rosa Gill (incumbent)	18,552	87.27%
Republican	Perry Whitlock	2,707	12.73%
Total votes		21,259	100%
Democratic hold			

=== 2012 ===
North Carolina House of Representatives 33rd district Democratic primary election, 2012
Party	Candidate	Votes	%
Democratic	Rosa Gill (incumbent)	8,158	78.66%
Democratic	Bernard Allen II	2,213	21.34%
Total votes		10,371`	100%

North Carolina House of Representatives 33rd district general election, 2012
Party	Candidate	Votes	%
Democratic	Rosa Gill (incumbent)	31,386	100%
Total votes		31,386	100%
Democratic hold			

=== 2010 ===
North Carolina House of Representatives 33rd district Democratic primary election, 2010
Party	Candidate	Votes	%
Democratic	Rosa Gill (incumbent)	3,048	71.57%
Democratic	Bernard Allen II	1,133	26.60%
Democratic	Doctor K. Aal Anubia	78	1.83%
Total votes		4,259	100%

North Carolina House of Representatives 33rd district general election, 2010
Party	Candidate	Votes	%
Democratic	Rosa Gill (incumbent)	18,426	77.79%
Republican	Paul Terrell	5,262	22.21%
Total votes		23,688	100%
Democratic hold			

== Committee assignments ==
=== 2023–2024 session ===
- Appropriations
- Appropriations - Education
- Pensions and Retirement (Vice-Chair)
- Education - K-12
- Insurance
- Judiciary II

=== 2021–2022 session ===
- Appropriations
- Appropriations - Education
- Pensions and Retirement (Vice-Chair)
- Education - K-12
- Insurance
- Judiciary I

=== 2019–2020 session ===
- Appropriations
- Appropriations - Education
- Pensions and Retirement
- Education - K-12
- Education - Community Colleges
- Insurance
- Judiciary

=== 2017–2018 session ===
- Appropriations
- Appropriations - Education
- Pensions and Retirement
- Education - K-12
- Insurance (Vice Chair)
- Alcoholic Beverage Control
- Homelessness, Foster Care, and Dependency
- State and Local Government I

=== 2015–2016 session ===
- Appropriations
- Appropriations - Education (Vice Chair)
- Insurance (Vice Chair)
- Pensions and Retirement
- Alcoholic Beverage Control
- Children, Youth and Families
- Elections

=== 2013–2014 session ===
- Appropriations
- Education
- State Personnel (Vice Chair)
- Government
- Public Utilities
- Transportation

=== 2011–2012 session ===
- Appropriations
- Education
- Government
- Public Utilities
- Transportation

=== 2009–2010 session ===
- Appropriations
- Education
- Election Law and Campaign Finance Reform
- Judiciary II
- State Government/State Personnel

North Carolina House of Representatives
Preceded by Dan Blue	Member of the North Carolina House of Representatives from the 33rd district 2009–2025	Succeeded by Monika Johnson-Hostler
