= Michele D. Presnell =

American politician from North Carolina

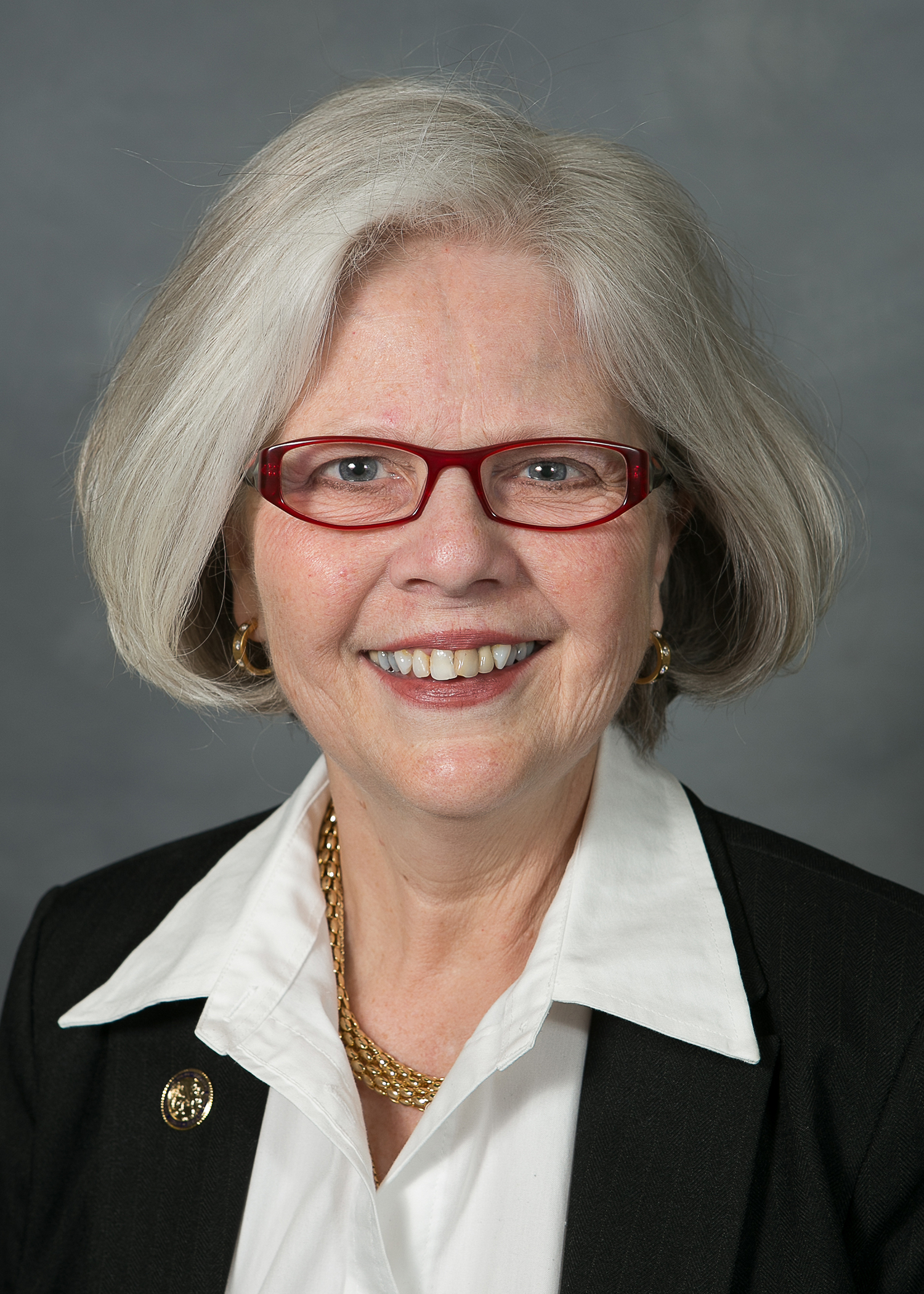

Member of the North Carolina House of Representatives from the 118th district
- In office January 1, 2013 – January 1, 2021
- Preceded by: Ray Rapp
- Succeeded by: Mark Pless

Personal details
- Born: March 5, 1952 (age 74)
- Party: Republican

Michele D. Charlton Presnell (born March 5, 1952) is a former Republican member of the North Carolina General Assembly from Yancey County. She represented the 118th district in the North Carolina House from 2013 until 2021.

== Honors ==
In 2018, Presnell was listed as a Champion of the Family in the NC Values Coalition Scorecard.

North Carolina House of Representatives
Preceded by Ray Rapp	Member of the North Carolina House of Representatives from the 118th district 2013-2021	Succeeded by Mark Pless
