= North Carolina's 118th House district =

American legislative district

North Carolina's 118th State House of Representatives district
Representative
Mark Pless; R–Canton
- Demographics: 91% White; 1% Black; 5% Hispanic; 3% Multiracial
- Population (2024): 84,529

North Carolina's 118th House district is one of 120 districts in the North Carolina House of Representatives. It has been represented by Republican Mark Pless since 2021.

== Geography ==
Since 2023, the district has included all of Madison and Haywood counties . The district overlaps with the 47th and 50th Senate districts.

== District officeholders since 2003 ==
Representative	Party	Dates	Notes	Counties
District created January 1, 2003.				2003–2005; All of Yancey and Madison counties. Part of Haywood County.
Ray Rapp (Mars Hill)	Democratic	January 1, 2003 – January 1, 2013	Lost re-election.	2003–2005; All of Yancey and Madison counties. Part of Haywood County.
Ray Rapp (Mars Hill)	Democratic	January 1, 2003 – January 1, 2013	Lost re-election.	2005–2013; All of Madison County. Parts of Yancey and Haywood counties.
Michele Presnell (Burnsville)	Republican	January 1, 2013 – January 1, 2021	Retired.	2013–2023; All of Yancey and Madison counties. Part of Haywood County.
Mark Pless (Canton)	Republican	January 1, 2021 – Present	Lost re-nomination.	2013–2023; All of Yancey and Madison counties. Part of Haywood County.
Mark Pless (Canton)	Republican	January 1, 2021 – Present	Lost re-nomination.	2023–Present; All of Madison and Haywood counties.

== Election results ==
=== 2026 ===
North Carolina House of Representatives 118th district Republican primary election, 2026
Party	Candidate	Votes	%
Republican	Jimmy Rogers	4,965	54.71%
Republican	Mark Pless (incumbent)	4,110	45.29%
Total votes		9,075	100%

North Carolina House of Representatives 118th district general election, 2026
Party	Candidate	Votes	%
Republican	Jimmy Rogers		
Democratic	Danny Davis		
Total votes			100%

=== 2024 ===
North Carolina House of Representatives 118th district general election, 2024
Party	Candidate	Votes	%
Republican	Mark Pless (incumbent)	30,807	61.26%
Democratic	Evelyn Davidson	19,480	38.74%
Total votes		50,287	100%
Republican hold			

=== 2022 ===
North Carolina House of Representatives 118th district general election, 2022
Party	Candidate	Votes	%
Republican	Mark Pless (incumbent)	22,040	60.28%
Democratic	Josh Remillard	14,522	39.72%
Total votes		36,562	100%
Republican hold			

=== 2020 ===
North Carolina House of Representatives 118th district general election, 2020
Party	Candidate	Votes	%
Republican	Mark Pless	29,321	63.60%
Democratic	Alan Jones	16,782	36.40%
Total votes		46,103	100%
Republican hold			

=== 2018 ===
North Carolina House of Representatives 118th district general election, 2018
Party	Candidate	Votes	%
Republican	Michele Presnell (incumbent)	19,369	57.18%
Democratic	Rhonda Cole Schandevel	14,506	42.82%
Total votes		33,875	100%
Republican hold			

=== 2016 ===
North Carolina House of Representatives 118th district Democratic primary election, 2016
Party	Candidate	Votes	%
Democratic	Rhonda Cole Schandevel	5,988	57.96%
Democratic	Reese Steen	4,343	42.04%
Total votes		10,331	100%

North Carolina House of Representatives 118th district general election, 2016
Party	Candidate	Votes	%
Republican	Michele Presnell (incumbent)	21,754	55.35%
Democratic	Rhonda Cole Schandevel	17,549	45.65%
Total votes		39,303	100%
Republican hold			

=== 2014 ===
North Carolina House of Representatives 118th district general election, 2014
Party	Candidate	Votes	%
Republican	Michele Presnell (incumbent)	13,858	51.27%
Democratic	Dean Hicks	13,169	48.73%
Total votes		27,027	100%
Republican hold			

=== 2012 ===
North Carolina House of Representatives 118th district Republican primary election, 2012
Party	Candidate	Votes	%
Republican	Michele Presnell	4,214	56.09%
Republican	Ben Keilman	1,652	21.99%
Republican	Jesse Sigmon	1,647	21.92%
Total votes		7,513	100%

North Carolina House of Representatives 118th district general election, 2012
Party	Candidate	Votes	%
Republican	Michele Presnell	18,749	51.32%
Democratic	Ray Rapp (incumbent)	17,788	48.68%
Total votes		36,537	100%
Republican gain from Democratic			

=== 2010 ===
North Carolina House of Representatives 118th district general election, 2010
Party	Candidate	Votes	%
Democratic	Ray Rapp (incumbent)	13,267	54.66%
Republican	Samuel L. "Sam" Edwards	11,006	45.34%
Total votes		24,273	100%
Democratic hold			

=== 2008 ===
North Carolina House of Representatives 118th district general election, 2008
Party	Candidate	Votes	%
Democratic	Ray Rapp (incumbent)	23,920	100%
Total votes		23,920	100%
Democratic hold			

=== 2006 ===
North Carolina House of Representatives 118th district general election, 2006
Party	Candidate	Votes	%
Democratic	Ray Rapp (incumbent)	16,712	69.18%
Republican	Chris Gowan	7,445	30.82%
Total votes		24,157	100%
Democratic hold			

=== 2004 ===
North Carolina House of Representatives 118th district general election, 2004
Party	Candidate	Votes	%
Democratic	Ray Rapp (incumbent)	21,110	100%
Total votes		21,110	100%
Democratic hold			

=== 2002 ===
North Carolina House of Representatives 118th district general election, 2002
Party	Candidate	Votes	%
Democratic	Ray Rapp	13,717	53.34%
Republican	Margaret Carpenter (incumbent)	11,476	44.62%
Libertarian	Barry Williams	525	2.04%
Total votes		25,718	100%
Democratic gain from Republican			
