= 1998 North Carolina House of Representatives election =

- November 3, 1998

All 120 seats in the North Carolina House of Representatives 61 seats needed for a majority
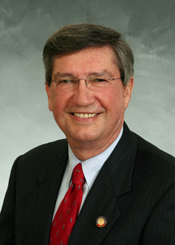

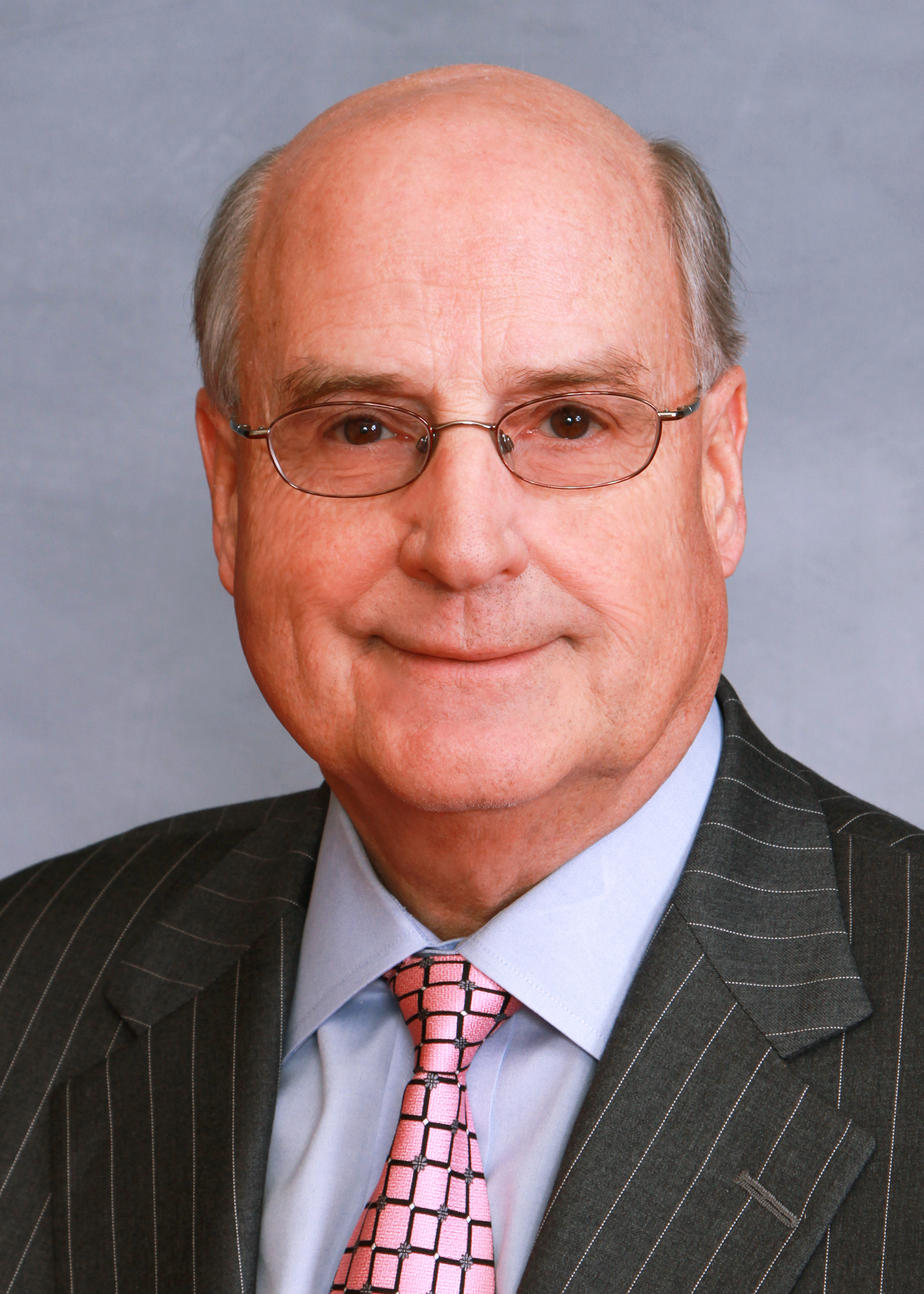
	Majority party	Minority party
Leader	Jim Black	Harold Brubaker
Party	Democratic	Republican
Leader's seat	36th - Matthews	38th - Asheboro
Last election	59	61
Seats won	66	54
Seat change	▲7	▼7
Speaker before election
Harold Brubaker
Republican
Elected Speaker
Jim Black
Democratic

The 1998 North Carolina House of Representatives election was held on November 3, 1998, to determine which party would control the North Carolina House of Representatives for the following two years in the 144th North Carolina General Assembly. All 120 house seats were up for election. Prior to the election 61 seats were held by Republicans and 59 were held by Democrats. The election coincided with elections for other offices including the U.S. Senate, U.S. House, and State Senate. Democrats made a net gain of 7 seats, thereby regaining control of the North Carolina House of Representatives after having previously lost it following the 1994 election.

== Retirements ==
Six incumbents (4 Republicans and 2 Democrats) did not run for re-election in 1998. Those incumbents were:

- Linwood Eborn Mercer (D-District 8) retired, seat won by Edith Warren (D).
- Cynthia Watson (R-District 10) retired, seat won by Russell Tucker (D).
- Dennis Alan Reynolds (R-District 25) retired, seat won by W.B. Teague (R).
- Robert Brawley (R-District 43) retired, seat won by Mitchell Setzer (R).
- Bob Hunter (D-District 49) retired to run for the North Carolina Court of Appeals, seat won by Mitch Gillespie (R).
- W. W. Dickson (R-District 76) retired, seat won by John Bridgeman (D).

== Incumbents defeated ==
- Edwin Hardy (R-District 2) lost re-election to Zeno Edwards (D).
- John Nichols (R-District 3) lost re-election to Scott Thomas (D).
- Henry Aldridge (R-District 9) lost re-election to Marian McLawhorn (D).
- Bobby Ray Hall (R-District 19) lost re-election to Leslie Cox (D).
- Fern Shubert (R-District 34) lost re-election to O. Max Melton (D).
- John Weatherly (R-District 48) lost re-election to Jim Horn (D).

== Results summary ==
District	Incumbent	Party	Elected	Party
1st	Bill Owens	Dem	Bill Owens	Dem
2nd	Edwin Hardy	Rep	Zeno Edwards	Dem
3rd	John Nichols	Rep	Scott Thomas	Dem
4th	Jean Preston	Rep	Jean Preston	Rep
4th	Ronald Smith	Dem	Ronald Smith	Dem
5th	Howard Hunter Jr.	Dem	Howard Hunter Jr.	Dem
6th	Gene Rogers	Dem	Gene Rogers	Dem
7th	Thomas Hardaway	Dem	Thomas Hardaway	Dem
8th	Linwood Eborn Mercer†	Dem	Edith Warren	Dem
9th	Henry Aldridge	Rep	Marian McLawhorn	Dem
10th	Cynthia Watson†	Rep	Russell Tucker	Dem
11th	Phil Baddour	Dem	Phil Baddour	Dem
12th	Nurham Warwick	Dem	Nurham Warwick	Dem
13th	Danny McComas	Rep	Danny McComas	Rep
14th	David Redwine	Dem	David Redwine	Dem
14th	Dewey Hill	Dem	Dewey Hill	Dem
15th	Sam Ellis	Rep	Sam Ellis	Rep
16th	Douglas Yongue	Dem	Douglas Yongue	Dem
17th	Theodore James Kinney	Dem	Theodore James Kinney	Dem
17th	Mary McAllister	Dem	Mary McAllister	Dem
18th	Bill Hurley	Dem	Bill Hurley	Dem
18th	Mia Morris	Rep	Mia Morris	Rep
19th	Bobby Ray Hall	Rep	Leslie Cox	Dem
19th	Don Davis	Rep	Don Davis	Rep
20th	Billy Creech	Rep	Billy Creech	Rep
21st	Dan Blue	Dem	Dan Blue	Dem
22nd	Jim Crawford	Dem	Jim Crawford	Dem
22nd	Gordon Allen	Dem	Gordon Allen	Dem
23rd	Paul Luebke	Dem	Paul Luebke	Dem
23rd	Mickey Michaux	Dem	Mickey Michaux	Dem
23rd	George Miller Jr.	Dem	George Miller Jr.	Dem
24th	Joe Hackney	Dem	Joe Hackney	Dem
24th	Verla Insko	Dem	Verla Insko	Dem
25th	Cary Allred	Rep	Cary Allred	Rep
25th	Dennis Alan Reynolds†	Rep	W.B. Teague	Rep
25th	Nelson Cole	Dem	Nelson Cole	Dem
26th	Alma Adams	Dem	Alma Adams	Dem
27th	Steve Wood	Ref	Steve Wood	Rep
28th	Flossie Boyd-McIntyre	Dem	Flossie Boyd-McIntyre	Dem
29th	Joanne Bowie	Rep	Joanne Bowie	Rep
30th	Arlie Culp	Rep	Arlie Culp	Rep
31st	Richard Morgan	Rep	Richard Morgan	Rep
32nd	Wayne Goodwin	Dem	Wayne Goodwin	Dem
33rd	Foyle Robert Hightower Jr.	Dem	Pryor Gibson	Dem
34th	Fern Shubert	Rep	O. Max Melton	Dem
35th	Charlotte Gardner	Rep	Charlotte Gardner	Rep
36th	Jim Black	Dem	Jim Black	Dem
37th	Paul Reeves McCrary	Dem	Paul Reeves McCrary	Dem
38th	Harold Brubaker	Rep	Harold Brubaker	Rep
39th	Lyons Gray	Rep	Lyons Gray	Rep
40th	William Hiatt	Rep	William Hiatt	Rep
40th	Gene Wilson	Rep	Gene Wilson	Rep
40th	Rex Baker	Rep	Rex Baker	Rep
41st	John Walter Brown	Rep	John Walter Brown	Rep
41st	George Holmes	Rep	George Holmes	Rep
42nd	Frank Mitchell	Rep	Frank Mitchell	Rep
43rd	Robert Brawley†	Rep	Mitchell Setzer	Rep
44th	John Gamble Jr.	Dem	Daniel Barefoot	Dem
45th	Joe Kiser	Rep	Joe Kiser	Rep
45th	Cherie Berry	Rep	Cherie Berry	Rep
46th	Charles Buchanan	Rep	Charles Buchanan	Rep
46th	Gregory Thompson	Rep	Gregory Thompson	Rep
47th	Walt Church	Dem	Walt Church	Dem
48th	Debbie Clary	Rep	Debbie Clary	Rep
48th	Andy Dedmon	Dem	Andy Dedmon	Dem
48th	John Weatherly	Rep	Jim Horn	Dem
49th	Bob Hunter†	Dem	Mitch Gillespie	Rep
50th	Larry Justus	Rep	Larry Justus	Rep
51st	Wilma Sherrill	Rep	Wilma Sherrill	Rep
51st	Martin Nesbitt	Dem	Martin Nesbitt	Dem
51st	Lanier Cansler	Rep	Lanier Cansler	Rep
52nd	Charles Millwee Beall	Dem	Phil Haire	Dem
52nd	Liston Ramsey	Dem	Liston Ramsey	Dem
53rd	James Carpenter	Rep	James Carpenter	Rep
54th	Drew Saunders	Dem	Drew Saunders	Dem
55th	Ed McMahan	Rep	Ed McMahan	Rep
56th	Martha Alexander	Dem	Martha Alexander	Dem
57th	Connie Wilson	Rep	Connie Wilson	Rep
58th	Ruth Easterling	Dem	Ruth Easterling	Dem
59th	Pete Cunningham	Dem	Pete Cunningham	Dem
60th	Beverly Earle	Dem	Beverly Earle	Dem
61st	Charles Neely	Rep	Charles Neely	Rep
62nd	David Miner	Rep	David Miner	Rep
63rd	Jane Hurley Mosely	Dem	Jane Hurley Mosely	Dem
64th	Bob Hensley	Dem	Bob Hensley	Dem
65th	Rick Eddins	Rep	Rick Eddins	Rep
66th	Larry Womble	Dem	Larry Womble	Dem
67th	Warren Oldham	Dem	Warren Oldham	Dem
68th	Bill Ives	Rep	Trudi Walend	Rep
69th	Jim Gulley	Rep	Jim Gulley	Rep
70th	Toby Fitch	Dem	Toby Fitch	Dem
71st	Joe Tolson	Dem	Joe Tolson	Dem
72nd	Gene Arnold	Rep	Gene Arnold	Rep
73rd	Wayne Sexton	Rep	Wayne Sexton	Rep
74th	Julia Craven Howard	Rep	Julia Craven Howard	Rep
75th	Alex Warner	Dem	Alex Warner	Dem
76th	W. W. Dickson†	Rep	John Bridgeman	Dem
77th	Carolyn Russell	Rep	Carolyn Russell	Rep
78th	Stanley Fox	Dem	Stanley Fox	Dem
79th	William Wainwright	Dem	William Wainwright	Dem
80th	Robert Grady	Rep	Robert Grady	Rep
81st	Tim Tallent	Rep	Tim Tallent	Rep
82nd	Bobby Barbee	Rep	Bobby Barbee	Rep
83rd	Gene McCombs	Rep	Gene McCombs	Rep
84th	Michael Decker	Rep	Michael Decker	Rep
85th	Ronnie Sutton	Dem	Ronnie Sutton	Dem
86th	Bill Culpepper	Dem	Bill Culpepper	Dem
87th	Donald Bonner	Dem	Donald Bonner	Dem
88th	Theresa Esposito	Rep	Theresa Esposito	Rep
89th	Mary Jarrell	Dem	Mary Jarrell	Dem
89th	Maggie Jeffus	Dem	Maggie Jeffus	Dem
90th	Richard Moore	Dem	Richard Moore	Dem
91st	Edgar Starnes	Rep	Edgar Starnes	Rep
92nd	Russell Capps	Rep	Russell Capps	Rep
93rd	John Rayfield	Rep	John Rayfield	Rep
94th	Jerry Dockham	Rep	Jerry Dockham	Rep
95th	Leo Daughtry	Rep	Leo Daughtry	Rep
96th	Edd Nye	Dem	Edd Nye	Dem
97th	Jerry Braswell	Dem	Jerry Braswell	Dem
98th	Thomas Wright	Dem	Thomas Wright	Dem

† - Incumbent not seeking re-election

House seats
Democratic	55.00%
Republican	45.00%

== See also ==
- List of North Carolina state legislatures
