= Kluttz =

Kluttz is a surname. Notable people with the surname include:

- Clyde Kluttz (1917–1979), American baseball player
- Lonnie Kluttz (born 1945), American basketball player
- Susan W. Kluttz, American politician
- Theodore F. Kluttz (1848–1918), American politician
- Tyler Kluttz, ring name Brad Maddox, (born 1984), American wrestler

== See also ==
- Barber & Kluttz, was an architectural firm that produced pattern books used across the United States
- Klutz (disambiguation)
