= William C. McGee =

American politician and stockbroker from North Carolina

Representative Bill McGee
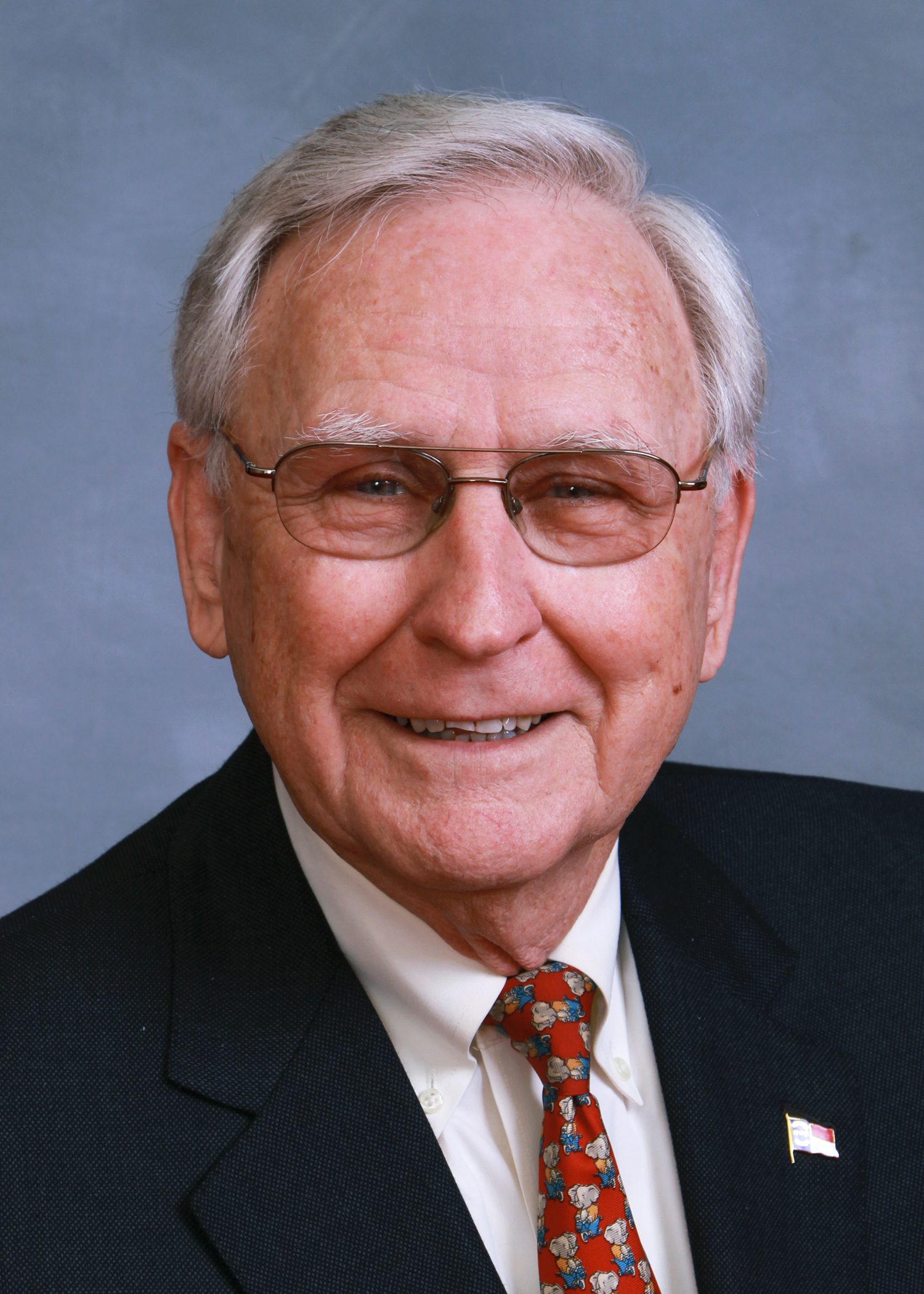

Member of the North Carolina House of Representatives
- In office January 1, 2003 – January 1, 2013
- Preceded by: Lyons Gray (Redistricting)
- Succeeded by: Donny Lambeth
- Constituency: 93rd District (2003-2005); 75th District (2005-2013)

Personal details
- Born: February 21, 1936 (age 90) King, North Carolina, U.S.
- Party: Republican
- Occupation: Retired stockbroker

Military service
- Allegiance: United States of America
- Years of service: 1958-64 National Guard of the United States
- N.C. General Assembly Profile PageProject Vote Smart Biography

William C. McGee (born February 21, 1936, in King, North Carolina) is a former Republican member of the North Carolina General Assembly representing the state's 75th House district, including constituents in Forsyth County. McGee is a retired stockbroker from Clemmons, North Carolina.

== Electoral history ==
=== 2010 ===
North Carolina House of Representatives 75th district general election, 2010
Party	Candidate	Votes	%
Republican	Bill McGee (incumbent)	17,824	100%
Total votes		17,824	100%
Republican hold			

=== 2008 ===
North Carolina House of Representatives 75th district general election, 2008
Party	Candidate	Votes	%
Republican	Bill McGee (incumbent)	22,697	57.53%
Democratic	Dan Bennett	16,758	42.47%
Total votes		39,455	100%
Republican hold			

=== 2006 ===
North Carolina House of Representatives 75th district general election, 2006
Party	Candidate	Votes	%
Republican	Bill McGee (incumbent)	12,893	100%
Total votes		12,893	100%
Republican hold			

=== 2004 ===
North Carolina House of Representatives 75th district general election, 2004
Party	Candidate	Votes	%
Republican	Bill McGee (incumbent)	24,978	100%
Total votes		24,978	100%
Republican hold			

=== 2002 ===
North Carolina House of Representatives 93rd district Democratic primary election, 2002
Party	Candidate	Votes	%
Democratic	Becky Johnson	3,427	69.58%
Democratic	Tom Brandon	1,498	30.42%
Total votes		4,925	100%

North Carolina House of Representatives 93rd district Republican primary election, 2002
Party	Candidate	Votes	%
Republican	Bill McGee	3,888	55.34%
Republican	Dale Folwell	3,138	44.66%
Total votes		7,026	100%

North Carolina House of Representatives 93rd district general election, 2002
Party	Candidate	Votes	%
Republican	Bill McGee	15,591	62.74%
Democratic	Becky Johnson	8,698	35.00%
Libertarian	Kevin Fortner	562	2.26%
Total votes		24,851	100%
Republican hold			

North Carolina House of Representatives
Preceded by John Rayfield	Member of the North Carolina House of Representatives from the 93rd district 2003-2005	Succeeded by Gene Wilson
Preceded by Jeff Barnhart	Member of the North Carolina House of Representatives from the 75th district 2005-2013	Succeeded by Donny Lambeth
