= North Carolina's 18th House district =

American legislative district

North Carolina's 18th State House of Representatives district
Representative
Deb Butler; D–Wilmington
- Demographics: 65% White; 18% Black; 10% Hispanic; 1% Asian; 1% Other; 5% Multiracial
- Population (2024): 94,798

North Carolina's 18th House district is one of 120 districts in the North Carolina House of Representatives. It has been represented by Democrat Deb Butler since 2017.

== Geography ==
Since 2021, the district has included part of New Hanover County. The district overlaps with the 7th and 8th Senate districts.

== District officeholders ==
=== Multi-member district ===
Representative	Party	Dates	Notes	Representative	Party	Dates	Notes	Representative	Party	Dates	Notes	Counties
District created January 1, 1967.
Kenneth Royall Jr. (Durham)	Democratic	January 1, 1967 – January 1, 1973	Redistricted to the 16th district and retired to run for State Senate.	Wade Penny Jr. (Durham)	Democratic	January 1, 1967 – January 1, 1971		W. Hance Hofler (Durham)	Democratic	January 1, 1967 – January 1, 1971	Redistricted from the Durham County district.	1967–1973; All of Durham County.
Kenneth Royall Jr. (Durham)	Democratic	January 1, 1967 – January 1, 1973	Redistricted to the 16th district and retired to run for State Senate.	Willis Whichard (Durham)	Democratic	January 1, 1971 – January 1, 1973	Redistricted to the 16th district.	George Miller Jr. (Durham)	Democratic	January 1, 1971 – January 1, 1973	Redistricted to the 16th district.	1967–1973; All of Durham County.
S. Gerald Arnold (Lillington)	Democratic	January 1, 1973 – January 1, 1975	Redistricted from the 22nd district. Retired to run for North Carolina Court of Appeals judge.	Jimmy Love (Sanford)	Democratic	January 1, 1973 – January 1, 1977	Redistricted from the 22nd district.					1973–1983; All of Harnett and Lee counties.
Carson Gregory (Angier)	Democratic	January 1, 1975 – January 1, 1979		Jimmy Love (Sanford)	Democratic	January 1, 1973 – January 1, 1977	Redistricted from the 22nd district.					1973–1983; All of Harnett and Lee counties.
Carson Gregory (Angier)	Democratic	January 1, 1975 – January 1, 1979		D. Fletcher Harris III (Sanford)	Democratic	January 1, 1977 – January 1, 1981						1973–1983; All of Harnett and Lee counties.
Bob Etheridge (Lillington)	Democratic	January 1, 1979 – January 1, 1983	Redistricted to the 19th district.	D. Fletcher Harris III (Sanford)	Democratic	January 1, 1977 – January 1, 1981						1973–1983; All of Harnett and Lee counties.
Bob Etheridge (Lillington)	Democratic	January 1, 1979 – January 1, 1983	Redistricted to the 19th district.	Dennis Wicker (Sanford)	Democratic	January 1, 1981 – January 1, 1983	Redistricted to the 19th district.					1973–1983; All of Harnett and Lee counties.
William Clark (Fayetteville)	Democratic	January 1, 1983 – January 1, 1987	Redistricted from the 20th district.	R. D. Beard (Fayetteville)	Democratic	January 1, 1983 – January 1, 1993	Redistricted from the 20th district.	Henry Tyson (Fayetteville)	Democratic	January 1, 1983 – January 1, 1987	Redistricted from the 20th district.	1983–2003; Part of Cumberland County.
Joseph Raynor Jr. (Fayetteville)	Democratic	January 1, 1987 – January 1, 1989	Retired to run for the State Senate.	R. D. Beard (Fayetteville)	Democratic	January 1, 1983 – January 1, 1993	Redistricted from the 20th district.	Alex Warner (Hope Mills)	Democratic	January 1, 1987 – January 1, 1993	Redistricted to the 75th district.	1983–2003; Part of Cumberland County.
Bill Hurley (Fayetteville)	Democratic	January 1, 1989 – January 1, 1993		R. D. Beard (Fayetteville)	Democratic	January 1, 1983 – January 1, 1993	Redistricted from the 20th district.	Alex Warner (Hope Mills)	Democratic	January 1, 1987 – January 1, 1993	Redistricted to the 75th district.	1983–2003; Part of Cumberland County.
Kenneth Spears Jr. (Fayetteville)	Democratic	January 1, 1993 – January 1, 1995		Billy Richardson (Fayetteville)	Democratic	January 1, 1993 – January 1, 1997						1983–2003; Part of Cumberland County.
Bill Hurley (Fayetteville)	Democratic	January 1, 1995 – January 1, 2003	Redistricted to the 45th district and retired.	Billy Richardson (Fayetteville)	Democratic	January 1, 1993 – January 1, 1997						1983–2003; Part of Cumberland County.
Bill Hurley (Fayetteville)	Democratic	January 1, 1995 – January 1, 2003	Redistricted to the 45th district and retired.	Mia Morris (Fayetteville)	Republican	January 1, 1997 – January 1, 2003	Redistricted to the 41st district and lost re-election.					1983–2003; Part of Cumberland County.

=== Single-member district ===
Representative	Party	Dates	Notes	Counties
Thomas Wright (Wilmington)	Democratic	January 1, 2003 – March 20, 2008	Redistricted from the 98th district. Expelled.	2003–2005; Parts of New Hanover, Brunswick, and Columbus counties.
Thomas Wright (Wilmington)	Democratic	January 1, 2003 – March 20, 2008	Redistricted from the 98th district. Expelled.	2005–2013; Parts of New Hanover and Pender counties.
Vacant		March 20, 2008 – April 8, 2008		2005–2013; Parts of New Hanover and Pender counties.
Sandra Hughes (Wilmington)	Democratic	April 8, 2008 – January 1, 2011	Appointed to finish Wright's term. Retired.	2005–2013; Parts of New Hanover and Pender counties.
Susi Hamilton (Wilmington)	Democratic	January 1, 2011 – January 26, 2017	Resigned.	2005–2013; Parts of New Hanover and Pender counties.
Susi Hamilton (Wilmington)	Democratic	January 1, 2011 – January 26, 2017	Resigned.	2013–2021; Parts of New Hanover and Brunswick counties.
Vacant		January 26, 2017 – February 6, 2017		2013–2021; Parts of New Hanover and Brunswick counties.
Deb Butler (Wilmington)	Democratic	February 6, 2017 – Present	Appointed to finish Hamilton's term.	2013–2021; Parts of New Hanover and Brunswick counties.
Deb Butler (Wilmington)	Democratic	February 6, 2017 – Present	Appointed to finish Hamilton's term.	2021–Present; Part of New Hanover County.

== Election results ==
=== 2024 ===
North Carolina House of Representatives 18th district general election, 2024
Party	Candidate	Votes	%
Democratic	Deb Butler (incumbent)	33,008	82.66%
Independent	Wallace West (write-in)	5,967	14.94%
Write-in		955	2.39%
Total votes		39,930	100%
Democratic hold			

=== 2022 ===
North Carolina House of Representatives 18th district general election, 2022
Party	Candidate	Votes	%
Democratic	Deb Butler (incumbent)	19,190	53.31%
Republican	John Hinnant	16,806	46.69%
Total votes		35,996	100%
Democratic hold			

=== 2020 ===
North Carolina House of Representatives 18th district general election, 2020
Party	Candidate	Votes	%
Democratic	Deb Butler (incumbent)	25,829	59.84%
Republican	Warren Kennedy	17,336	40.16%
Total votes		43,165	100%
Democratic hold			

=== 2018 ===
North Carolina House of Representatives 18th district general election, 2018
Party	Candidate	Votes	%
Democratic	Deb Butler (incumbent)	17,812	62.43%
Republican	Louis Harmati	9,835	34.47%
Libertarian	Joseph D. Sharp	885	3.10%
Total votes		28,532	100%
Democratic hold			

=== 2016 ===
North Carolina House of Representatives 18th district general election, 2016
Party	Candidate	Votes	%
Democratic	Susi Hamilton (incumbent)	22,006	61.10%
Republican	Gerald "Jerry" Benton	14,011	38.90%
Total votes		36,017	100%
Democratic hold			

=== 2014 ===
North Carolina House of Representatives 18th district general election, 2014
Party	Candidate	Votes	%
Democratic	Susi Hamilton (incumbent)	14,786	100%
Total votes		14,786	100%
Democratic hold			

=== 2012 ===
North Carolina House of Representatives 18th district Democratic primary election, 2012
Party	Candidate	Votes	%
Democratic	Susi Hamilton (incumbent)	4,798	70.29%
Democratic	James A. Knox	2,028	29.71%
Total votes		6,826	100%

North Carolina House of Representatives 18th district general election, 2012
Party	Candidate	Votes	%
Democratic	Susi Hamilton (incumbent)	22,588	66.53%
Republican	Louis Harmati	11,362	33.47%
Total votes		33,950	100%
Democratic hold			

=== 2010 ===
North Carolina House of Representatives 18th district Democratic primary election, 2010
Party	Candidate	Votes	%
Democratic	Susi Hamilton	1,753	50.89%
Democratic	James L. Utley Jr.	1,692	49.11%
Total votes		3,445	100%

North Carolina House of Representatives 18th district Republican primary election, 2010
Party	Candidate	Votes	%
Republican	Beth Dawson	1,360	53.29%
Republican	J. Michael Hutson	1,192	46.71%
Total votes		2,552	100%

North Carolina House of Representatives 18th district general election, 2010
Party	Candidate	Votes	%
Democratic	Susi Hamilton	10,097	57.05%
Republican	Beth Dawson	7,600	42.95%
Total votes		17,697	100%
Democratic hold			

=== 2008 ===
North Carolina House of Representatives 18th district Democratic primary election, 2008
Party	Candidate	Votes	%
Democratic	Sandra Hughes (incumbent)	9,296	74.91%
Democratic	Hollis B. Briggs Jr.	1,912	15.41%
Democratic	Thomas Wright	1,201	9.68%
Total votes		12,409	100%

North Carolina House of Representatives 18th district general election, 2008
Party	Candidate	Votes	%
Democratic	Sandra Hughes (incumbent)	20,243	67.18%
Republican	George J. Swart	9,888	32.82%
Total votes		30,131	100%
Democratic hold			

=== 2006 ===
North Carolina House of Representatives 18th district Democratic primary election, 2006
Party	Candidate	Votes	%
Democratic	Thomas Wright (incumbent)	2,816	67.84%
Democratic	Laura Padgett	1,335	32.16%
Total votes		4,151	100%

North Carolina House of Representatives 18th district general election, 2006
Party	Candidate	Votes	%
Democratic	Thomas Wright (incumbent)	8,007	63.56%
Republican	Frankie Roberts	4,590	36.44%
Total votes		12,597	100%
Democratic hold			

=== 2004 ===
North Carolina House of Representatives 18th district Democratic primary election, 2004
Party	Candidate	Votes	%
Democratic	Thomas Wright (incumbent)	2,792	81.49%
Democratic	Fred Spain	634	18.51%
Total votes		3,426	100%

North Carolina House of Representatives 18th district general election, 2004
Party	Candidate	Votes	%
Democratic	Thomas Wright (incumbent)	14,712	63.80%
Republican	Frankie Roberts	8,347	36.20%
Total votes		23,059	100%
Democratic hold			

=== 2002 ===
North Carolina House of Representatives 18th district general election, 2002
Party	Candidate	Votes	%
Democratic	Thomas Wright (incumbent)	12,028	74.21%
Republican	Jack White	3,696	22.80%
Libertarian	Stephen Shepherd	485	2.99%
Total votes		16,209	100%
Democratic hold			

=== 2000 ===
North Carolina House of Representatives 18th district general election, 2000
Party	Candidate	Votes	%
Democratic	Bill Hurley (incumbent)	23,317	49.86%
Republican	Mia Morris (incumbent)	20,472	43.78%
Libertarian	Christian G. Davis	2,973	6.36%
Total votes		46,762	100%
Democratic hold			
Republican hold			
