= Rick Glazier =

American politician from North Carolina

Richard Glazier
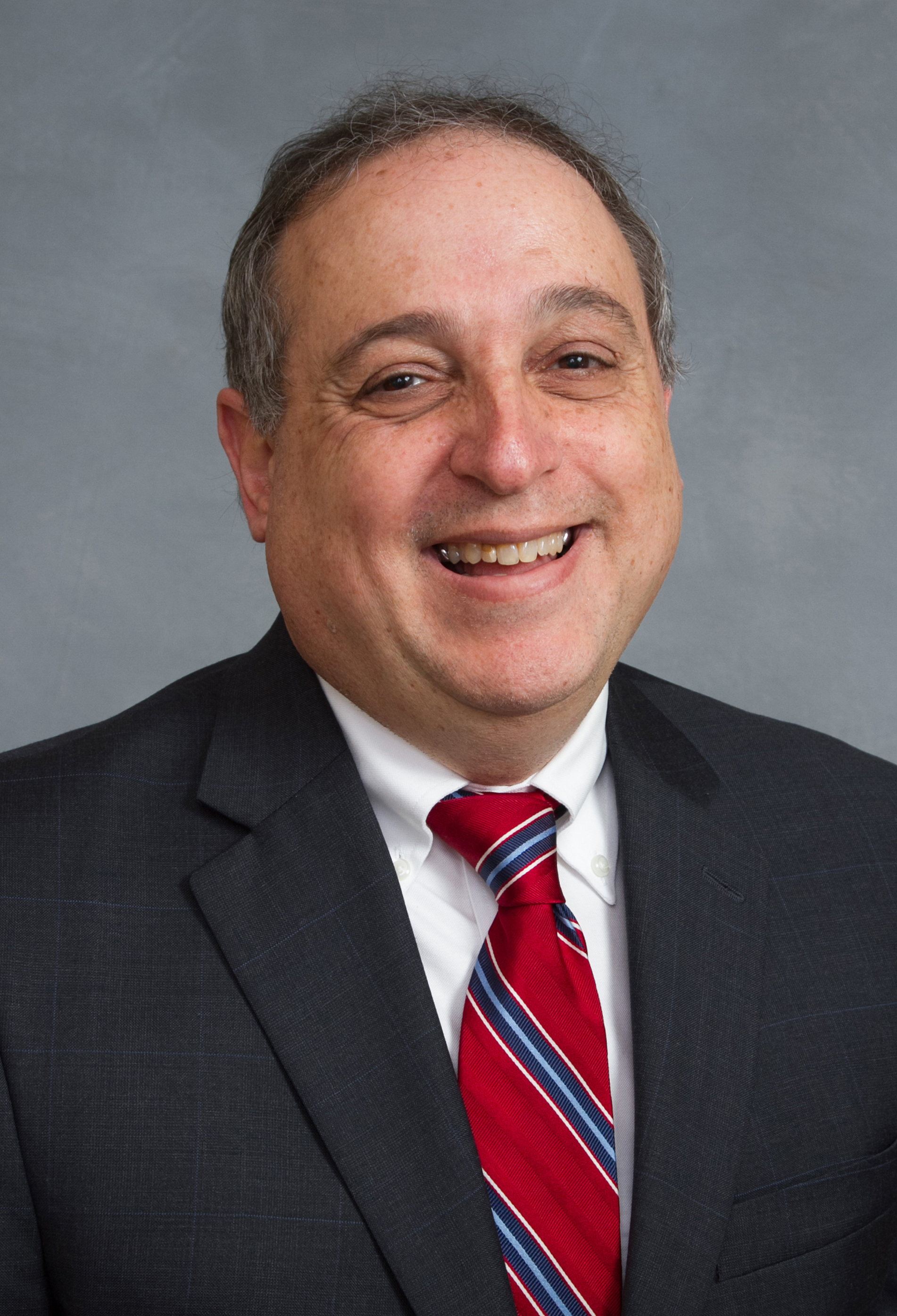
- Glazier in 2013

Member of the North Carolina House of Representatives
- In office January 1, 2003 – August 28, 2015
- Preceded by: John Hurley (Redistricting)
- Succeeded by: Billy Richardson
- Constituency: 44th District (2003-2005); 45th District (2005-2013); 44th District (2013-2015)

Personal details
- Born: June 16, 1955 (age 71) Allentown, Pennsylvania, U.S.
- Party: Democratic
- Education: Pennsylvania State University; Wake Forest University
- Profession: Attorney

Richard "Rick" Glazier (born June 16, 1955) is an American politician who served as a Democratic member of the North Carolina House of Representatives, representing the 45th district, from 2003 until his resignation in 2015. He resigned to become executive director of the North Carolina Justice Center.

For part of his tenure in the legislature, Glazier served as a House Minority Whip. He has also been an adjunct professor of law at Campbell University's Norman Adrian Wiggins School of Law.

== Electoral history ==
=== 2014 ===
North Carolina House of Representatives 44th district general election, 2014
Party	Candidate	Votes	%
Democratic	Rick Glazier (incumbent)	10,171	52.51%
Republican	Richard Button	9,200	47.49%
Total votes		19,371	100%
Democratic hold			

=== 2012 ===
North Carolina House of Representatives 44th district general election, 2012
Party	Candidate	Votes	%
Democratic	Rick Glazier (incumbent)	17,266	56.31%
Republican	Richard D. Button	13,398	43.69%
Total votes		30,664	100%
Democratic hold			

=== 2010 ===
North Carolina House of Representatives 45th district Democratic primary election, 2010
Party	Candidate	Votes	%
Democratic	Rick Glazier (incumbent)	2,714	73.13%
Democratic	Tina Odom	997	26.87%
Total votes		3,711	100%

North Carolina House of Representatives 45th district general election, 2010
Party	Candidate	Votes	%
Democratic	Rick Glazier (incumbent)	9,858	50.12%
Republican	Jackie Warner	9,812	49.88%
Total votes		19,670	100%
Democratic hold			

=== 2008 ===
North Carolina House of Representatives 45th district general election, 2008
Party	Candidate	Votes	%
Democratic	Rick Glazier (incumbent)	24,225	100%
Total votes		24,225	100%
Democratic hold			

=== 2006 ===
North Carolina House of Representatives 45th district general election, 2006
Party	Candidate	Votes	%
Democratic	Rick Glazier (incumbent)	6,990	52.30%
Republican	Alex Warner	6,375	47.70%
Total votes		13,365	100%
Democratic hold			

=== 2004 ===
North Carolina House of Representatives 45th district Democratic primary election, 2004
Party	Candidate	Votes	%
Democratic	Rick Glazier (incumbent)	2,227	51.42%
Democratic	Alex Warner (incumbent)	2,104	48.58%
Total votes		4,331	100%

North Carolina House of Representatives 45th district general election, 2004
Party	Candidate	Votes	%
Democratic	Rick Glazier (incumbent)	15,100	60.16%
Republican	Robert T. Lawrence	10,001	39.84%
Total votes		25,101	100%
Democratic hold			

=== 2002 ===
North Carolina House of Representatives 44th district general election, 2002
Party	Candidate	Votes	%
Democratic	Rick Glazier	7,523	53.43%
Republican	Michael Stone	6,556	46.57%
Total votes		14,079	100%
Democratic hold			

North Carolina House of Representatives
Preceded by Daniel Barefoot	Member of the North Carolina House of Representatives from the 44th district 2003–2005	Succeeded by Margaret Dickson
Preceded by Alex Warner	Member of the North Carolina House of Representatives from the 45th district 2005–2013	Succeeded by John Szoka
Preceded by Diane Parfitt	Member of the North Carolina House of Representatives from the 44th district 2013–2015	Succeeded by Billy Richardson
