= John Szoka =

American politician from North Carolina

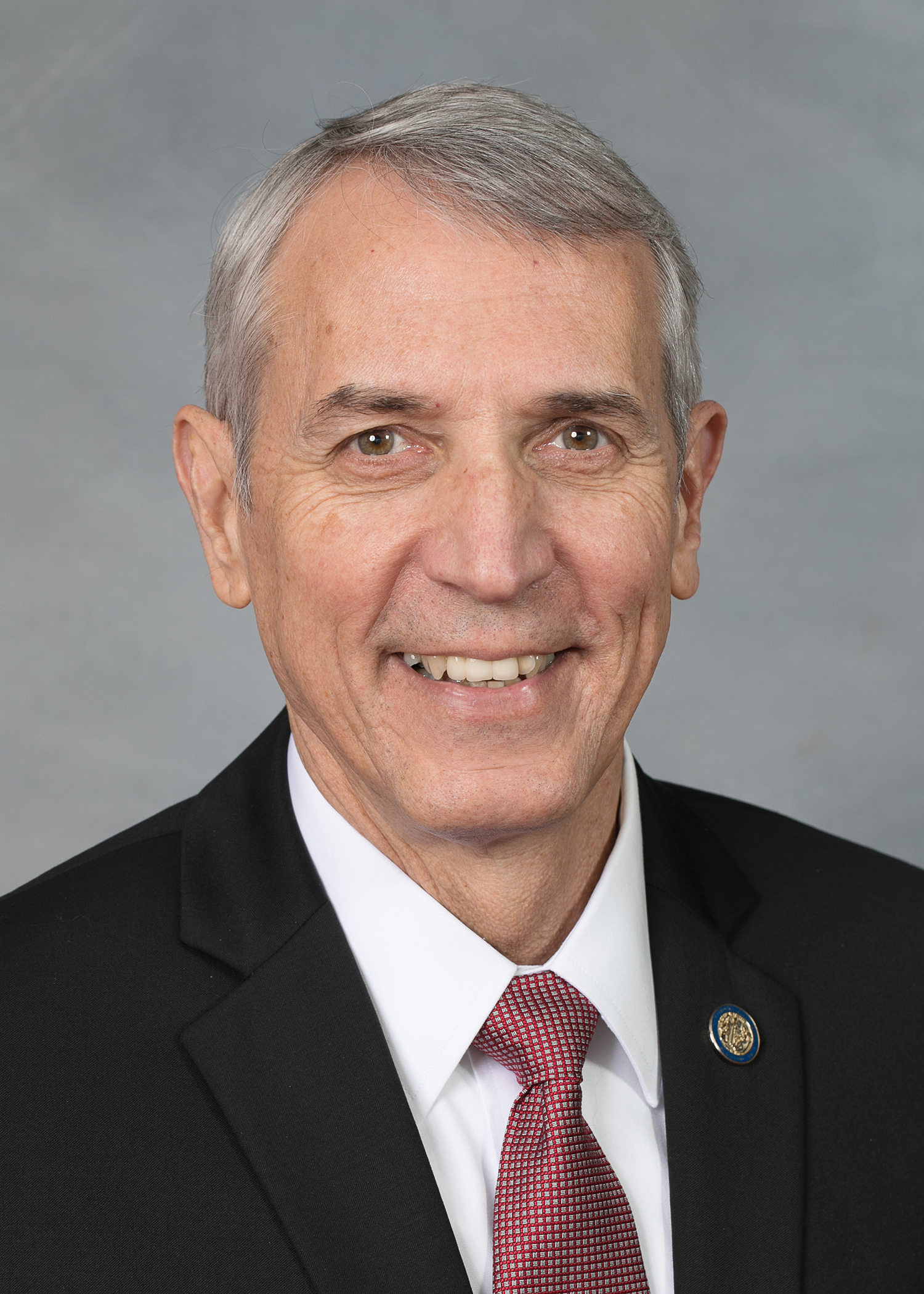

Member of the North Carolina House of Representatives from the 45th district
- In office January 1, 2013 – January 1, 2023
- Preceded by: Constituency established
- Succeeded by: Frances Jackson

Personal details
- Born: John D. Szoka; October 21, 1954 (age 71) Cleveland, Ohio
- Party: Republican
- Spouse: Laurie
- Children: 2
- Education: United States Military Academy (BS); University of Texas at Austin (MS)

Military service
- Branch/service: United States Army
- Years of service: 1976–1996

John D. Szoka (born October 21, 1954) is an American politician who served as a member of the North Carolina House of Representatives from the 45th district from 2013 to 2023. A Republican, was first elected in November 2012 and assumed office in January 2013.

== Early life and education ==
Szoka was born in Cleveland and raised in Maple Heights, Ohio. After graduating from Maple Heights High School, he earned a Bachelor of Science degree in engineering from the United States Military Academy and a Master of Science in operations research from the University of Texas at Austin, where he specialized in mathematics and computer modelling.

== Career ==
Szoka served in the United States Army from 1976 to 1996. Since 2011 he has worked as a branch manager for Certainty Home Loans. He was elected to the North Carolina House of Representatives in November 2012 and assumed office in January 2013.

In November 2021, Szoka declared his candidacy for North Carolina's 4th congressional district in the 2022 election. He later withdrew and unsuccessfully ran for the Cumberland County Board of Commissioners.

== Electoral history ==
=== 2022 ===
Cumberland County Board of Commissioners at-large general election, 2022
Party	Candidate	Votes	%
Democratic	Veronica Jones	41,621	28.38%
Democratic	Marshall Faircloth	39,203	26.73%
Republican	John Szoka	35,497	24.20%
Republican	Ron Ross	30,339	20.69%
Total votes		146,660	100%
Democratic hold			
Democratic hold			

=== 2020 ===
North Carolina House of Representatives 45th district general election, 2020
Party	Candidate	Votes	%
Republican	John Szoka (incumbent)	20,260	50.88%
Democratic	Frances Jackson	19,557	49.12%
Total votes		39,817	100%
Republican hold			

=== 2018 ===
North Carolina House of Representatives 45th district general election, 2018
Party	Candidate	Votes	%
Republican	John Szoka (incumbent)	17,280	58.36%
Democratic	Albeiro (Al) Florez	12,330	41.64%
Total votes		29,610	100%
Republican hold			

=== 2016 ===
North Carolina House of Representatives 45th district general election, 2016
Party	Candidate	Votes	%
Republican	John Szoka (incumbent)	23,495	100%
Total votes		23,495	100%
Republican hold			

=== 2014 ===
North Carolina House of Representatives 45th district general election, 2014
Party	Candidate	Votes	%
Republican	John Szoka (incumbent)	12,813	100%
Total votes		12,813	100%
Republican hold			

=== 2012 ===
North Carolina House of Representatives 45th district Republican primary election, 2012
Party	Candidate	Votes	%
Republican	John Szoka	3,093	57.72%
Republican	Diane Wheatley	2,266	42.28%
Total votes		5,359	100%

North Carolina House of Representatives 45th district general election, 2012
Party	Candidate	Votes	%
Republican	John Szoka	16,208	56.40%
Democratic	Eddie Dees	12,532	43.60%
Total votes		28,740	100%
Republican win (new seat)			

=== 2010 ===
North Carolina House of Representatives 22nd district general election, 2010
Party	Candidate	Votes	%
Democratic	William Brisson (incumbent)	12,675	52.87%
Republican	John Szoka	11,298	47.13%
Total votes		23,973	100%
Democratic hold			

North Carolina House of Representatives
Preceded by Rick Glazier	Member of the North Carolina House of Representatives from the 45th district 2013–2023	Succeeded by Frances Jackson
