= Charles Smith (North Carolina politician) =

American politician

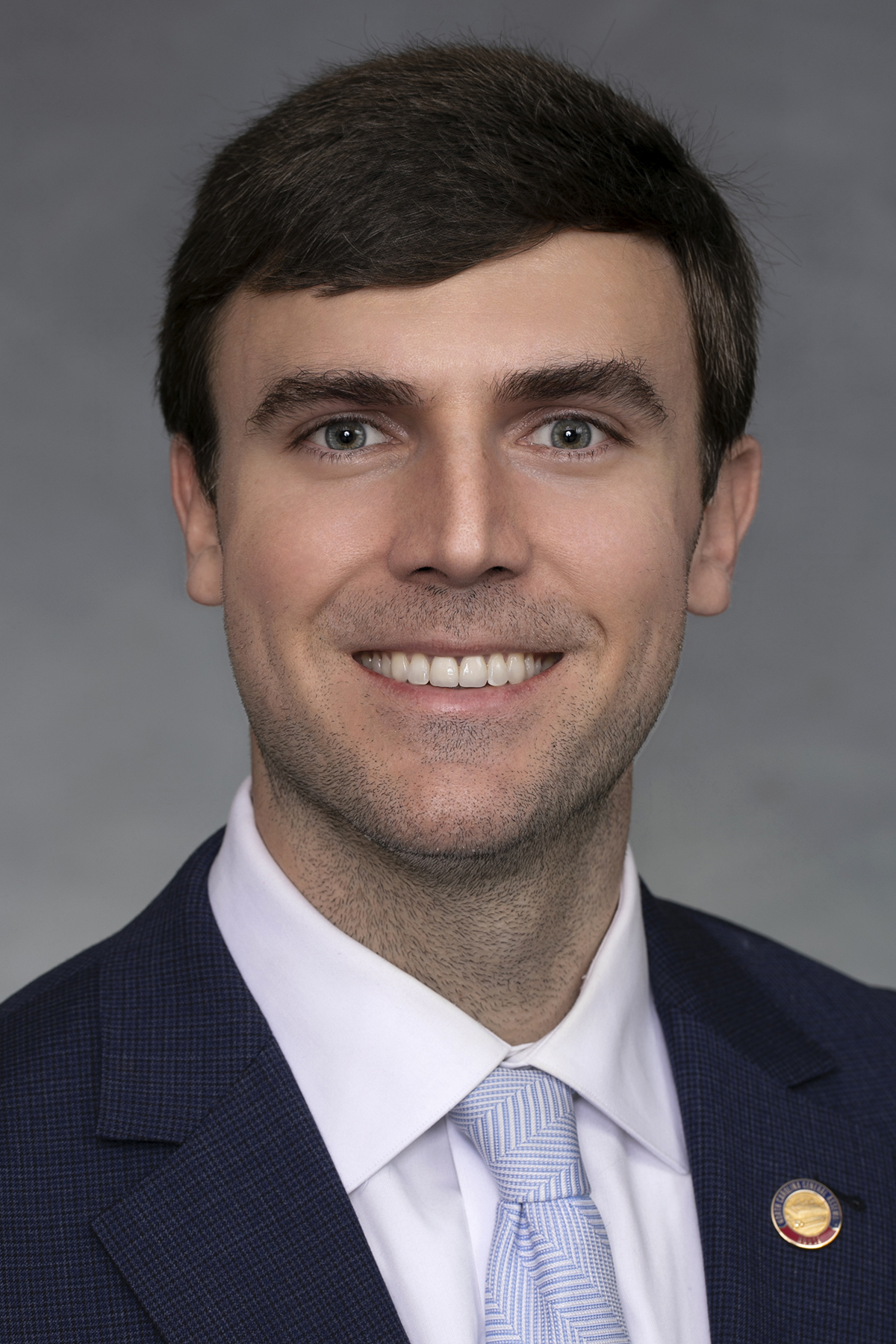

Member of the North Carolina House of Representatives from the 44th district
- Incumbent
- Assumed office January 1, 2023
- Preceded by: Billy Richardson

Personal details
- Party: Democratic
- Spouse: Mary Kelly
- Education: Emory & Henry College; University of North Carolina at Chapel Hill (JD)
- Website: Official website

Charles Ruppe Smith is an American politician. He is a Democratic member of the North Carolina House of Representatives, who has represented the 44th district (including portions of central Cumberland County) since 2023. Smith previously served as an Assistant District Attorney for Cumberland County.

== Committee assignments ==
=== 2023-2024 session ===
- Appropriations
- Appropriations - General Government
- Families, Children, and Aging Policy
- Military and Veterans Affairs
- State Government
- Wildlife Resources

== Electoral history ==
=== 2022 ===
North Carolina House of Representatives 44th district Democratic primary election, 2022
Party	Candidate	Votes	%
Democratic	Charles Smith	3,650	61.77%
Democratic	Terry L. Johnson Sr.	2,259	38.23%
Total votes		5,909	100%

North Carolina House of Representatives 44th district general election, 2022
Party	Candidate	Votes	%
Democratic	Charles Smith	14,903	100%
Total votes		14,903	100%
Democratic hold			

North Carolina House of Representatives
Preceded by Billy Richardson	Member of the North Carolina House of Representatives from the 44th district 2023–Present	Incumbent
