= Susi Hamilton =

American politician

Susi H. Hamilton
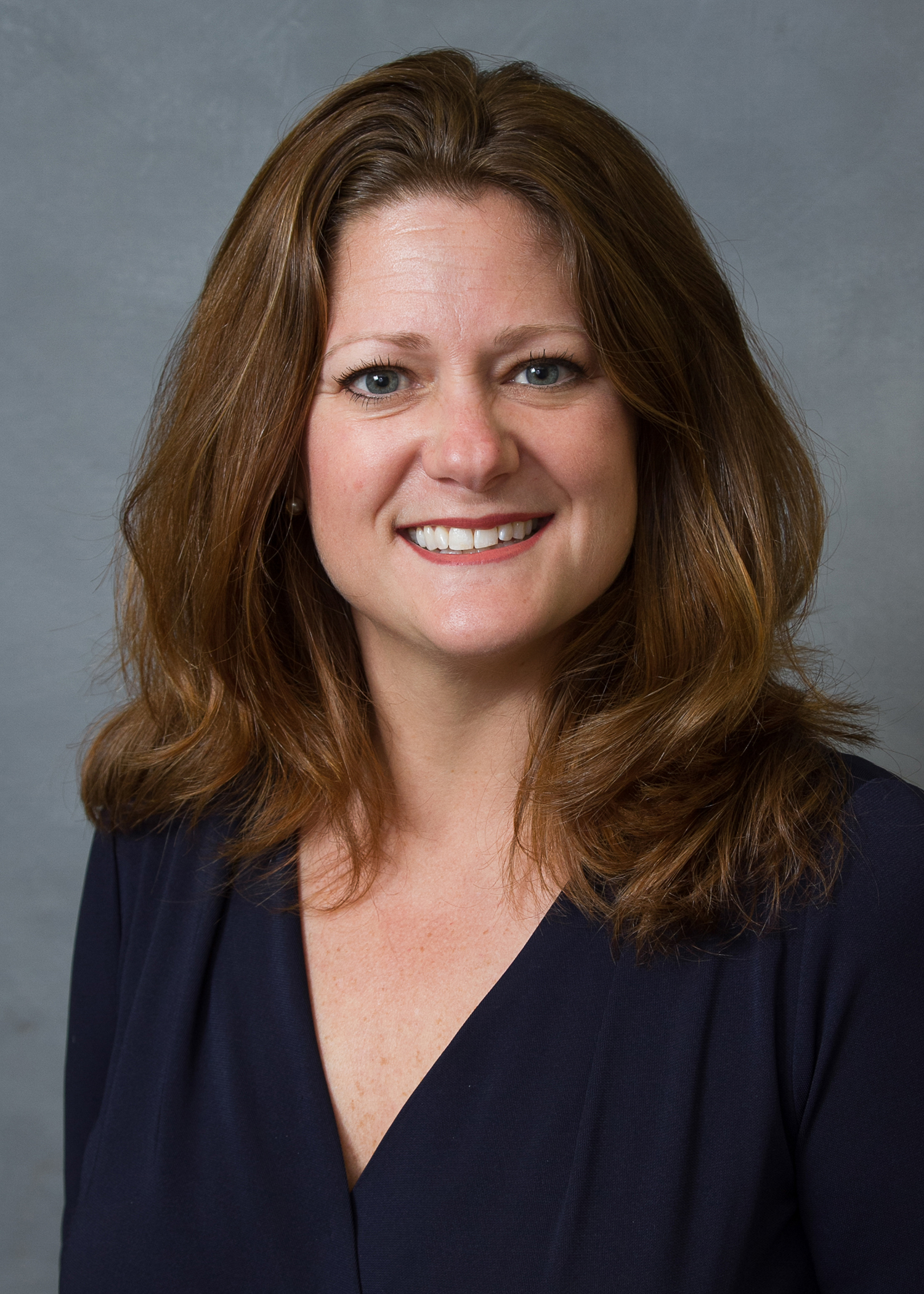

Secretary of the North Carolina Department of Natural and Cultural Resources
- In office January 26, 2017 – 2021
- Governor: Roy Cooper
- Preceded by: Susan W. Kluttz
- Succeeded by: D. Reid Wilson

Member of the North Carolina House of Representatives from the 18th district
- In office January 1, 2011 – January 26, 2017
- Preceded by: Sandra Hughes
- Succeeded by: Deb Butler

Personal details
- Party: Democratic
- Spouse: Steve
- Education: University of North Carolina at Chapel Hill, UNC Wilmington

Susi Hamilton was a Democratic member of the North Carolina House of Representatives from 2011 to 2017. Hamilton also owns the consulting firm, Hamilton Planning, which specializes in city planning and downtown economic development. In 2017, Governor Roy Cooper named her Secretary of the North Carolina Department of Natural and Cultural Resources in his Cabinet.

North Carolina House of Representatives
Preceded by Sandra Hughes	Member of the North Carolina House of Representatives from the 18th district 2011-2017	Succeeded by Deb Butler
