= Donny Lambeth =

American politician from North Carolina (born 1950)

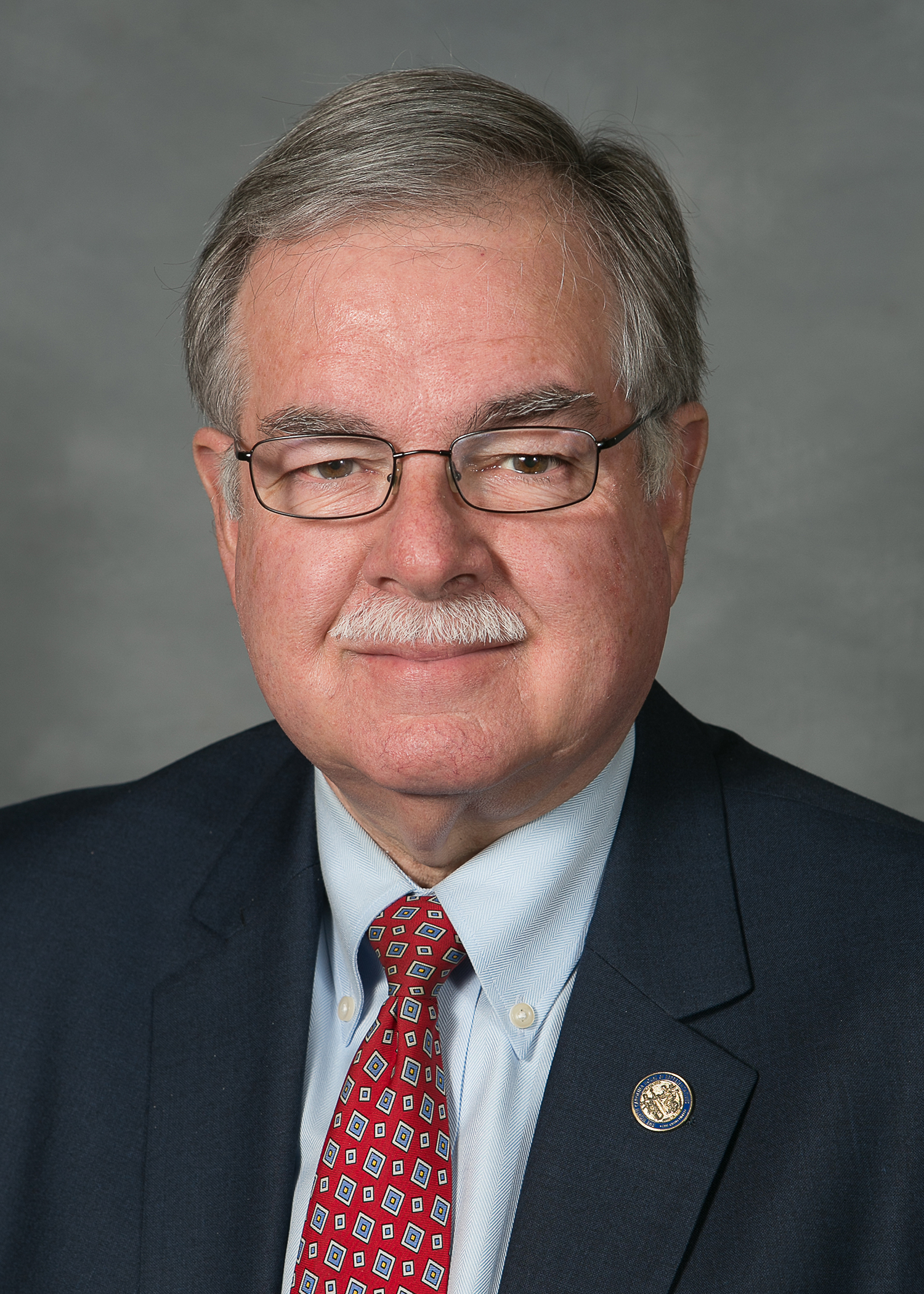

Member of the North Carolina House of Representatives from the 75th district
- Incumbent
- Assumed office January 1, 2013
- Preceded by: Bill McGee

Personal details
- Born: Donny Carr Lambeth; 1950 (age 75–76) Winston-Salem, North Carolina, U.S.
- Party: Republican
- Spouse: Pam
- Children: 4
- Education: High Point University (BA); Wake Forest University (MBA)
- Occupation: former President Wake Forest Baptist Hospital (retired); former school board chair

Donny Carr Lambeth (born 1950) is a Republican member of the North Carolina House of Representatives. He has represented the 75th district (including constituents in eastern Forsyth County) since 2013.

== Political positions ==
Lambeth voted for the 2017 budget that did not provide teachers with a stipend for out-of-pocket expenses. Over half of teachers in North Carolina have second jobs. NC has improved its rank from 41st in 2017 to 29th in the country for teacher pay and 2nd in the SouthEast two years later.

== Committee assignments ==
=== 2021-2022 session ===
- Appropriations (Senior Chair)
- Appropriations - Health and Human Services (Vice Chair)
- Health (chair)
- Education - K-12
- Education - Universities
- Insurance
- Pensions and Retirement
- UNC BOG Nominations

=== 2019-2020 session ===
- Appropriations (Senior Chair)
- Appropriations - Health and Human Services (Vice Chair)
- Health (chair)
- Education - K-12
- Education - Universities
- Pensions and Retirement
- Families, Children, and Aging Policy

=== 2017-2018 session ===
- Appropriations (chair)
- Health (chair)
- Health Care Reform (chair)
- Education - K-12
- Education - Universities
- Insurance
- Pensions and Retirement
- State Personnel
- Aging

=== 2015-2016 session ===
- Appropriations (chair)
- Health (chair)
- Education - K-12
- Insurance
- State Personnel
- Aging

=== 2013-2014 session ===
- Appropriations
- Education
- State Personnel
- Agriculture
- Banking
- Commerce and Job Development

== Electoral history ==
=== 2020 ===
North Carolina House of Representatives 75th district Republican primary election, 2020
Party	Candidate	Votes	%
Republican	Donny Lambeth (incumbent)	4,713	68.02%
Republican	Jacob Baum	2,216	31.98%
Total votes		6,929	100%

North Carolina House of Representatives 75th district general election, 2020
Party	Candidate	Votes	%
Republican	Donny Lambeth (incumbent)	26,693	60.31%
Democratic	Elisabeth Motsinger	17,564	39.69%
Total votes		44,257	100%
Republican hold			

=== 2018 ===
North Carolina House of Representatives 75th district general election, 2018
Party	Candidate	Votes	%
Republican	Donny Lambeth (incumbent)	17,652	53.09%
Democratic	Dan Besse	15,599	46.91%
Total votes		33,251	100%
Republican hold			

=== 2016 ===
North Carolina House of Representatives 75th district general election, 2016
Party	Candidate	Votes	%
Republican	Donny Lambeth (incumbent)	30,831	100%
Total votes		30,831	100%
Republican hold			

=== 2014 ===
North Carolina House of Representatives 75th district general election, 2014
Party	Candidate	Votes	%
Republican	Donny Lambeth (incumbent)	16,616	62.77%
Democratic	David Gordon	9,857	37.23%
Total votes		26,473	100%
Republican hold			

=== 2012 ===
North Carolina House of Representatives 75th district general election, 2012
Party	Candidate	Votes	%
Republican	Donny Lambeth	29,073	100%
Total votes		29,073	100%
Republican hold			

North Carolina House of Representatives
Preceded by Bill McGee	Member of the North Carolina House of Representatives from the 75th district 2013-Present	Incumbent
