= Sandra Hughes =

American politician

Member of the North Carolina House of Representatives from the 18th district
- In office April 8, 2008 – January 1, 2011
- Preceded by: Thomas Wright
- Succeeded by: Susi Hamilton

Personal details
- Party: Democratic

Sandra Spaulding Hughes is a Democratic member of the North Carolina House of Representatives. She has represented the 18th district (New Hanover and Pender counties) since her appointment in April 2008 to replace Thomas E. Wright, who had been expelled. Hughes was elected to a full term in 2008 and chose not to seek another term in 2010.

== Notes ==
North Carolina House of Representatives
Preceded by Thomas Wright	Member of the North Carolina House of Representatives from the 18th district 2008-2011	Succeeded by Susi Hamilton
