= William O. Richardson =

American politician

Billy Richardson
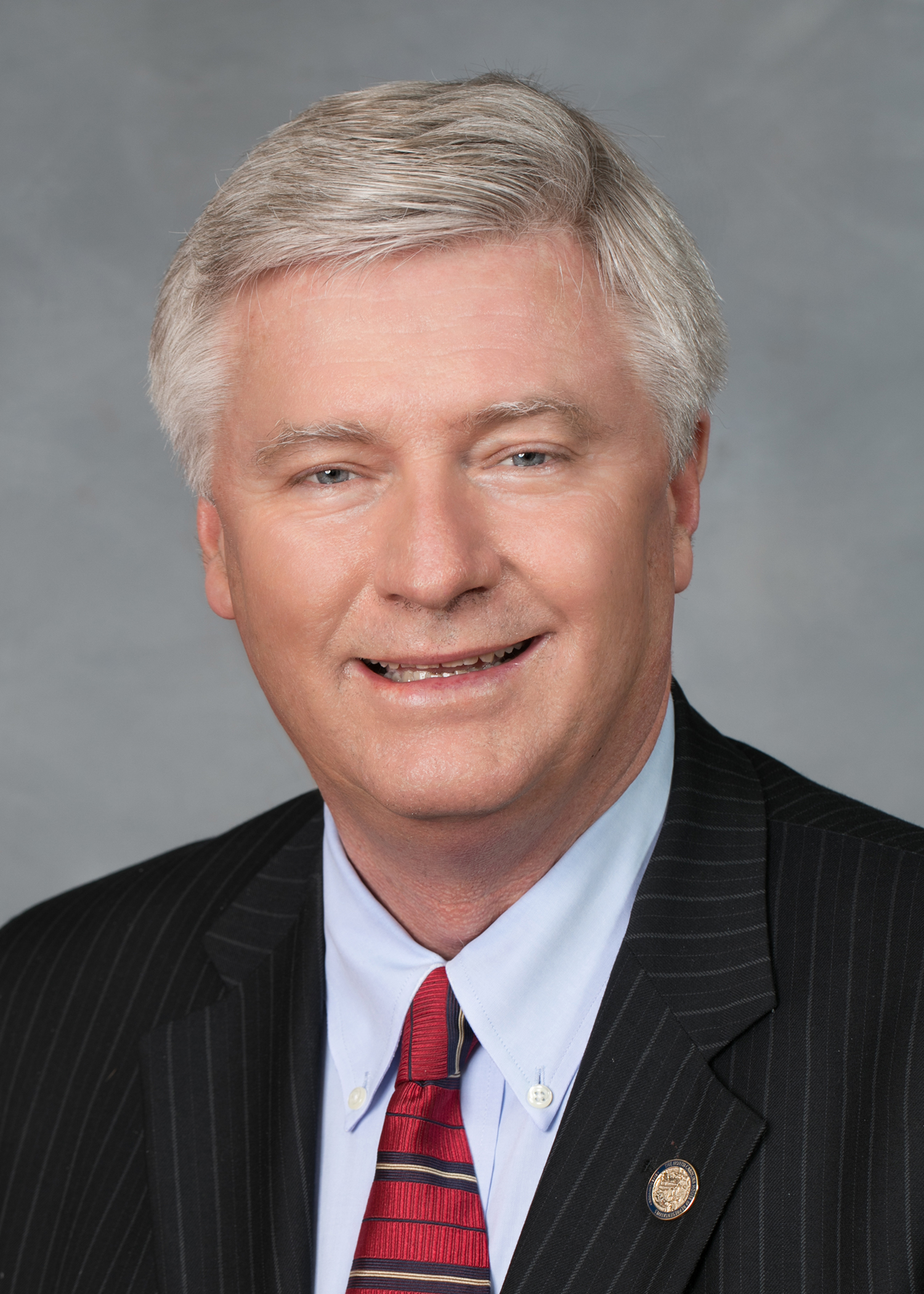

Member of the North Carolina House of Representatives
- In office September 1, 2015 – January 1, 2023
- Preceded by: Rick Glazier
- Succeeded by: Charles Smith
- Constituency: 44th District
- In office January 27, 1993 – January 29, 1997 Serving with Kenneth Owen Spears Jr., John W. "Bill" Hurley
- Preceded by: Rayford Donald Beard; John William Hurley; Alex Warner
- Succeeded by: Mia Morris
- Constituency: 18th District

Personal details
- Born: June 9, 1955 (age 71) New Bern, North Carolina, U.S.
- Party: Democratic
- Spouse: Barbara
- Children: 3
- Education: University of North Carolina, Chapel Hill (BA); Campbell University (JD)
- Occupation: lawyer

William O. Richardson (born June 9, 1955) is an American politician. He was elected to the North Carolina House of Representatives in 2015. A Democrat, he represented the 44th district from 2015 to 2023. He also previously served in the House from 1993 to 1996. He ran for the North Carolina Senate in the 19th district during the 2014 elections. He lost the general election to Wesley Meredith. Richardson ran for North Carolina's 8th congressional district in the 2002 election. He lost the primary to Chris Kouri.

Richardson's unsuccessful defense of Timothy Hennis, who perpetrated the Eastburn family murders, was featured in the CNN documentary series Death Row Stories.

== Early life and education ==
Richardson graduated from the University of North Carolina at Chapel Hill in 1977 and the Norman Adrian Wiggins School of Law at Campbell University in 1980.

== Electoral history ==
=== 2020 ===
North Carolina House of Representatives 44th district Democratic primary election, 2020
Party	Candidate	Votes	%
Democratic	Billy Richardson (incumbent)	5,129	52.10%
Democratic	Terry Johnson	4,715	47.90%
Total votes		9,844	100%

North Carolina House of Representatives 44th district general election, 2020
Party	Candidate	Votes	%
Democratic	Billy Richardson (incumbent)	25,412	71.86%
Republican	Heather S. Holmes	9,950	28.14%
Total votes		35,362	100%
Democratic hold			

=== 2018 ===
North Carolina House of Representatives 44th district general election, 2018
Party	Candidate	Votes	%
Democratic	Billy Richardson (incumbent)	13,448	56.56%
Republican	Linda Devore	10,328	43.44%
Total votes		23,776	100%
Democratic hold			

=== 2016 ===
North Carolina House of Representatives 44th district general election, 2016
Party	Candidate	Votes	%
Democratic	Billy Richardson (incumbent)	15,433	50.57%
Republican	Jim Arp	15,086	49.43%
Total votes		30,519	100%
Democratic hold			

North Carolina House of Representatives
Preceded by Rayford Donald Beard; John W. "Bill" Hurley; Alex Warner	Member of the North Carolina House of Representatives from the 18th district 1993–1997; Served alongside: Kenneth Owen Spears Jr., John W. "Bill" Hurley	Succeeded by Mia Morris
Preceded by Rick Glazier	Member of the North Carolina House of Representatives from the 44th district 2015–2023	Succeeded by Charles Smith
