= Klutz =

Klutz may refer to:

- Klutz Press, a publishing company
- Klütz (or "Kluetz") is a surname and a town in the Nordwestmecklenburg district, Mecklenburg-Western Pomerania, Germany
- Captain Klutz, comic strip superhero parody of Mad Magazine

== See also ==
- Kluttz, a surname
