= Deb Butler =

American politician from North Carolina

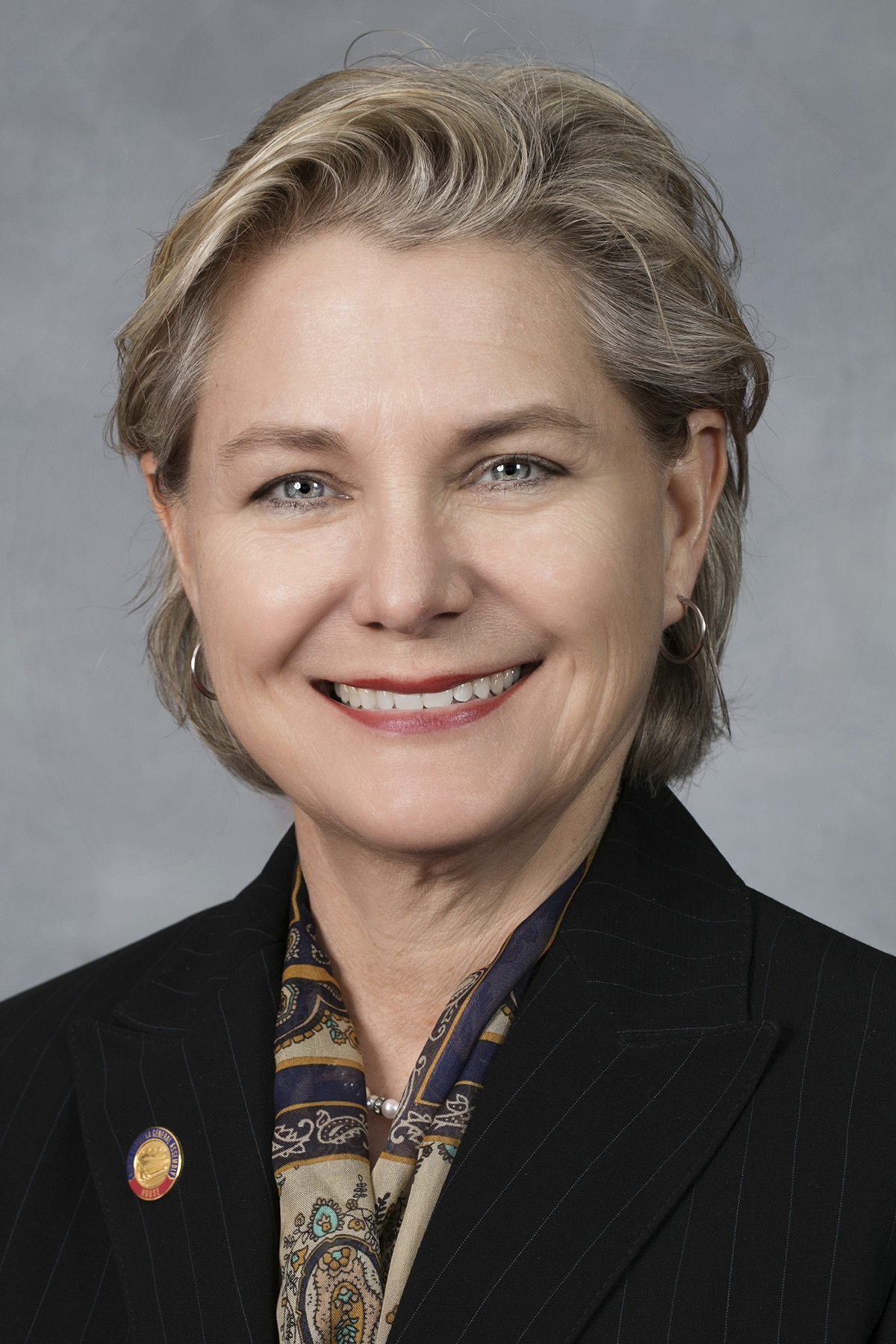

Member of the North Carolina House of Representatives from the 18th district
- Incumbent
- Assumed office February 6, 2017
- Preceded by: Susi Hamilton

Personal details
- Party: Democratic
- Spouse: Anni Parra
- Education: University of Tennessee (BA); Wake Forest University (JD)
- Website: Campaign website

Deborah Armfield "Deb" Butler is an American politician and attorney serving as a member of the North Carolina House of Representatives, where she has served since 2017. She represents the 18th House District, covering a portion of New Hanover County, as a member of the Democratic Party.

== North Carolina General Assembly ==
In 2012 Butler unsuccessfully challenged Republican Thom Goolsby for a seat in the North Carolina Senate, losing by an 8-point margin. Butler was appointed to the North Carolina House of Representatives in 2017 to succeed Susi Hamilton, after Hamilton was appointed to head the North Carolina Department of Natural and Cultural Resources by Governor Roy Cooper. She has been re-elected to the seat twice, most recently in 2020. She's a member of the Progressive House Caucus.

== Personal life ==
Butler is a lesbian. She is one of four openly LGBT officeholders currently serving in the North Carolina state legislature, alongside caucus colleagues Marcia Morey, Allison Dahle and Cecil Brockman.

Butler works as a lawyer in Wilmington, North Carolina. She married Anni Parra in 2015.

== Electoral history ==
=== 2024 ===
North Carolina House of Representatives 18th district general election, 2024
Party	Candidate	Votes	%
Democratic	Deb Butler (incumbent)	33,008	82.66%
Independent	Wallace West (write-in)	5,967	14.94%
Write-in		955	2.39%
Total votes		39,930	100%
Democratic hold			

=== 2022 ===
North Carolina House of Representatives 18th district general election, 2022
Party	Candidate	Votes	%
Democratic	Deb Butler (incumbent)	19,190	53.31%
Republican	John Hinnant	16,806	46.69%
Total votes		35,996	100%
Democratic hold			

=== 2020 ===
North Carolina House of Representatives 18th district general election, 2020
Party	Candidate	Votes	%
Democratic	Deb Butler (incumbent)	25,829	59.84%
Republican	Warren Kennedy	17,336	40.16%
Total votes		43,165	100%
Democratic hold			

=== 2018 ===
North Carolina House of Representatives 18th district general election, 2018
Party	Candidate	Votes	%
Democratic	Deb Butler (incumbent)	17,812	62.43%
Republican	Louis Harmati	9,835	34.47%
Libertarian	Joseph D. Sharp	885	3.10%
Total votes		28,532	100%
Democratic hold			

=== 2012 ===
North Carolina Senate 9th district general election, 2012
Party	Candidate	Votes	%
Republican	Thom Goolsby (incumbent)	52,955	54.16%
Democratic	Deb Butler	44,817	45.84%
Total votes		97,772	100%
Republican hold			

== Committee assignments ==
=== 2021–2022 Session ===
- Banking
- Commerce
- Finance
- Judiciary III
- Transportation

=== 2019–2020 Session ===
- Banking
- Commerce
- Finance
- Transportation
- Redistricting

=== 2017–2018 Session ===
- Aging
- Finance
- Judiciary IV
- State and Local Government I
- State Personnel
