= Frances Jackson (politician) =

American politician

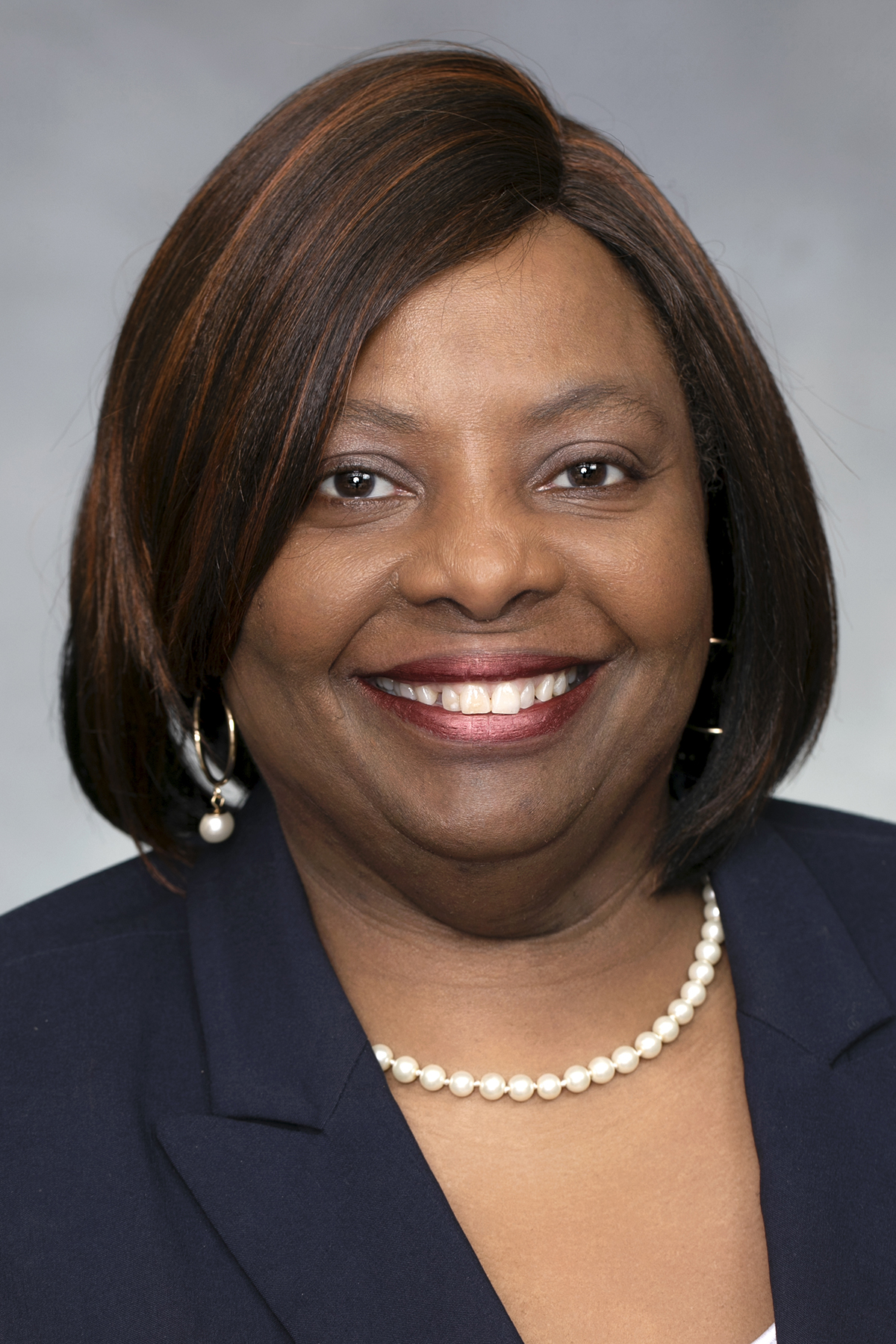

Member of the North Carolina House of Representatives from the 45th district
- Incumbent
- Assumed office January 1, 2023
- Preceded by: John Szoka

Personal details
- Born: Frances Vinell
- Party: Democratic
- Education: North Carolina A&T State University (BS); Fayetteville State University (MA); Walden University (PhD)
- Occupation: Educator
- Website: Official website

Frances Vinell Jackson is a Democratic member of the North Carolina House of Representatives, who has represented the 45th district (including portions of southwestern Cumberland County) since 2023. A former middle school teacher, adjunct professor, and transit planner from Fayetteville, North Carolina, Jackson unsuccessfully ran for the same seat in 2020.

== Committee assignments ==
=== 2023-2024 session ===
- Appropriations
- Appropriations - Capital
- Military and Veterans Affairs
- State Government
- Transportation

== Electoral history ==
=== 2022 ===
North Carolina House of Representatives 45th district Democratic primary election, 2022
Party	Candidate	Votes	%
Democratic	Frances Jackson	2,228	52.45%
Democratic	Chris Davis	1,746	41.10%
Democratic	Keith Byrd	274	6.45%
Total votes		4,248	100%

North Carolina House of Representatives 45th district general election, 2022
Party	Candidate	Votes	%
Democratic	Frances Jackson	11,148	55.16%
Republican	Susan Chapman	9,064	44.84%
Total votes		20,212	100%
Democratic gain from Republican			

=== 2020 ===
North Carolina House of Representatives 45th district Democratic primary election, 2020
Party	Candidate	Votes	%
Democratic	Frances Jackson	5,313	69.12%
Democratic	Keith Byrd	2,374	30.88%
Total votes		7,687	100%

North Carolina House of Representatives 45th district general election, 2020
Party	Candidate	Votes	%
Republican	John Szoka (incumbent)	20,260	50.88%
Democratic	Frances Jackson	19,557	49.12%
Total votes		39,817	100%
Republican hold			

North Carolina House of Representatives
Preceded by John Szoka	Member of the North Carolina House of Representatives from the 45th district 2023–Present	Incumbent
