= North Carolina's 75th House district =

American legislative district

North Carolina's 75th State House of Representatives district
Representative
Donny Lambeth; R–Winston-Salem
- Demographics: 58% White; 20% Black; 17% Hispanic; 2% Asian; 3% Multiracial
- Population (2024): 91,271

North Carolina's 75th House district is one of 120 districts in the North Carolina House of Representatives. It has been represented by Republican Donny Lambeth since 2013.

== Geography ==
Since 2005, the district has included part of Forsyth County. The district overlaps with the 31st and 32nd Senate districts.

== District officeholders ==
Representative	Party	Dates	Notes	Counties
District created January 1, 1993.
Alex Warner (Hope Mills)	Democratic	January 1, 1993 – January 1, 2003	Redistricted from the 18th district. Redistricted to the 45th district.	1993–2003; Part of Cumberland County.
Jeff Barnhart (Concord)	Republican	January 1, 2003 – January 1, 2005	Redistricted from the 81st district. Redistricted to the 82nd district.	2003–2005; Part of Cabarrus County.
Bill McGee (Clemmons)	Republican	January 1, 2005 – January 1, 2013	Redistricted from the 93rd district. Retired.	2005–Present; Parts of Forsyth County.
Donny Lambeth (Winston-Salem)	Republican	January 1, 2013 – Present		2005–Present; Parts of Forsyth County.

== Election results ==
=== 2024 ===
North Carolina House of Representatives 75th district general election, 2024
Party	Candidate	Votes	%
Republican	Donny Lambeth (incumbent)	26,118	56.95%
Democratic	Caroline Warren	19,743	43.05%
Total votes		45,861	100%
Republican hold			

=== 2022 ===
North Carolina House of Representatives 75th district general election, 2022
Party	Candidate	Votes	%
Republican	Donny Lambeth (incumbent)	19,925	100%
Total votes		19,925	100%
Republican hold			

=== 2020 ===
North Carolina House of Representatives 75th district Democratic primary election, 2020
Party	Candidate	Votes	%
Democratic	Elisabeth Motsinger	4,834	63.88%
Democratic	Gardenia Henley	2,733	36.12%
Total votes		7,567	100%

North Carolina House of Representatives 75th district Republican primary election, 2020
Party	Candidate	Votes	%
Republican	Donny Lambeth (incumbent)	4,713	68.02%
Republican	Jacob Baum	2,216	31.98%
Total votes		6,929	100%

North Carolina House of Representatives 75th district general election, 2020
Party	Candidate	Votes	%
Republican	Donny Lambeth (incumbent)	26,693	60.31%
Democratic	Elisabeth Motsinger	17,564	39.69%
Total votes		44,257	100%
Republican hold			

=== 2018 ===
North Carolina House of Representatives 75th district general election, 2018
Party	Candidate	Votes	%
Republican	Donny Lambeth (incumbent)	17,652	53.09%
Democratic	Dan Besse	15,599	46.91%
Total votes		33,251	100%
Republican hold			

=== 2016 ===
North Carolina House of Representatives 75th district general election, 2016
Party	Candidate	Votes	%
Republican	Donny Lambeth (incumbent)	30,831	100%
Total votes		30,831	100%
Republican hold			

=== 2014 ===
North Carolina House of Representatives 75th district general election, 2014
Party	Candidate	Votes	%
Republican	Donny Lambeth (incumbent)	16,616	62.77%
Democratic	David Gordon	9,857	37.23%
Total votes		26,473	100%
Republican hold			

=== 2012 ===
North Carolina House of Representatives 75th district general election, 2012
Party	Candidate	Votes	%
Republican	Donny Lambeth	29,073	100%
Total votes		29,073	100%
Republican hold			

=== 2010 ===
North Carolina House of Representatives 75th district general election, 2010
Party	Candidate	Votes	%
Republican	Bill McGee (incumbent)	17,824	100%
Total votes		17,824	100%
Republican hold			

=== 2008 ===
North Carolina House of Representatives 75th district general election, 2008
Party	Candidate	Votes	%
Republican	Bill McGee (incumbent)	22,697	57.53%
Democratic	Dan Bennett	16,758	42.47%
Total votes		39,455	100%
Republican hold			

=== 2006 ===
North Carolina House of Representatives 75th district general election, 2006
Party	Candidate	Votes	%
Republican	Bill McGee (incumbent)	12,893	100%
Total votes		12,893	100%
Republican hold			

=== 2004 ===
North Carolina House of Representatives 75th district general election, 2004
Party	Candidate	Votes	%
Republican	Bill McGee (incumbent)	24,978	100%
Total votes		24,978	100%
Republican hold			

=== 2002 ===
North Carolina House of Representatives 75th district Republican primary election, 2002
Party	Candidate	Votes	%
Republican	Jeff Barnhart (incumbent)	1,305	45.89%
Republican	Wm Whitaker "Whit" Moose	1,144	40.23%
Republican	James Lentz	395	13.89%
Total votes		2,844	100%

North Carolina House of Representatives 75th district general election, 2002
Party	Candidate	Votes	%
Republican	Jeff Barnhart (incumbent)	11,289	59.30%
Democratic	Wayne Troutman	7,747	40.70%
Total votes		19,036	100%
Republican hold			

=== 2000 ===
North Carolina House of Representatives 75th district general election, 2000
Party	Candidate	Votes	%
Democratic	Alex Warner (incumbent)	11,228	60.54%
Republican	James F. Mabe	7,318	39.46%
Total votes		18,546	100%
Democratic hold			
