= Mia Morris White =

American politician from North Carolina

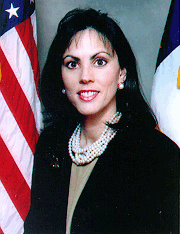
Mia Morris Saraille

Mia Morris Saraille (born February 13, 1965, in Ibadan, Nigeria) is a former Member of the North Carolina House of Representatives, elected to serve three consecutive terms, representing House District 18 (1996-2002). She was the first and so far only Republican and first woman elected in history of House District 18. She has a B.A. in French and Philosophy from the University of San Francisco.

== Career ==
Before being elected she worked as a:

- Legislative Liaison for the office of the Speaker of the North Carolina House of Representatives (1995)
- Member of Campaign Staff, Bush/Quayle Campaign (1992)
- Special Assistant to the President for Presidential Personnel, The White House, George H. W. Bush Administration (1988-1989)
- Member of Vice-President Dan Quayle's Advance Team, Bush/Quayle Administration (1988)

North Carolina House of Representatives
Preceded by Billy Richardson	Member of the North Carolina House of Representatives from the 18th district 1997–2003; Served alongside: John W. "Bill" Hurley	Succeeded by Thomas Wright
