= Susan W. Kluttz =

American politician

Secretary of North Carolina Department of Natural and Cultural Resources
- In office January 5, 2013 – January 1, 2017
- Governor: Pat McCrory
- Preceded by: Linda Carlisle
- Succeeded by: Susi Hamilton

Mayor of Salisbury, North Carolina
- In office 1997–2011
- Preceded by: Margaret Kluttz
- Succeeded by: Paul Woodson

Personal details
- Party: Democratic
- Spouse: William
- Children: 2
- Education: Mt. Vernon Junior College; University of North Carolina at Greensboro (BA)

Susan Wear Kluttz is a former Secretary of the North Carolina Department of Natural and Cultural Resources and was formerly the longest-serving mayor of Salisbury, North Carolina.

== Early life and education ==
Kluttz is a graduate of Boyden High School (now Salisbury High School) and Mt. Vernon Junior College in Washington, D.C. She graduated with a Bachelor's degree in English from the University of North Carolina at Greensboro.

== Career ==
She has worked in Rowan County at the Waterworks Visual Arts Center and YMCA.

Prior to becoming mayor of Salisbury, Kluttz served as an executive assistant to the Superintendent of the Rowan-Salisbury School System. Her father, John Wear, was a former mayor and encouraged her to run after the then-mayor, Margaret Kluttz (no direct relation), did not seek re-election in 1997. Susan Kluttz won the most votes in the election and served as the city's mayor until 2011, becoming the city's longest-serving mayor.

After Pat McCrory, a Republican was elected Governor of North Carolina in 2012, he named Kluttz, a Democrat, to be Secretary of Natural and Cultural Resources. This position oversees the State Library of North Carolina, the North Carolina Museum of History, the North Carolina Symphony and other cultural and nature-related agencies. She took office on January 5, 2013. She supervised the expansion of the Department in September 2015, when the Department of Natural Resources (including the N.C. Zoological Park, the N.C. Aquariums, the N.C. State Parks, the N.C. Museum of Natural Sciences, the Clean Water Management Trust Fund and the Natural Heritage Program) was merged with Cultural Resources.

Kluttz served until January 1, 2017, when she was replaced by Susi H. Hamilton in the new administration of Governor Roy Cooper.

== Personal life ==
She currently lives in North Carolina with her husband William C. Kluttz, Jr., a District Court judge. They have two children.

She is also an active member of the St. Luke's Episcopal Church and is a part of Western North Carolina Rail Coalition committee.

== Honors ==
She received a Citizen of the Year award in 2002 from the Salisbury Civitan club and a year later was awarded Woman of the Year award from the Lions Club. In 2004 she received the Salisbury-Rowan Ministerial Association Community Spirit award and was awarded the Elizabeth Duncan Koontz Humanitarian Award the same year.

Catawba College established a scholarship in her name for students studying environmental science in 2007.
