= North Carolina's 44th House district =

American legislative district

North Carolina's 44th State House of Representatives district
Representative
Charles Smith; D–Fayetteville
- Demographics: 36% White; 41% Black; 11% Hispanic; 3% Asian; 1% Native American; 1% Hawaiian/Pacific Islander; 1% Other; 6% Multiracial
- Population (2024): 81,910

North Carolina's 44th House district is one of 120 districts in the North Carolina House of Representatives. It has been represented by Democrat Charles Smith since 2023.

== Geography ==
Since 2003, the district has included part of Cumberland County. The district overlaps with the 19th Senate district.

== District officeholders since 1967 ==
=== Single-member district ===
Representative	Party	Dates	Notes	Counties
District created January 1, 1967.
Mark Isaac (Newland)	Republican	January 1, 1967 – January 1, 1969		1967–1973; All of Watauga, Avery, and Mitchell counties.
James Holshouser (Boone)	Republican	January 1, 1969 – January 1, 1973	Redistricted to the 28th district and retired to run for Governor.	1967–1973; All of Watauga, Avery, and Mitchell counties.

=== Multi-member district ===
Representative	Party	Dates	Notes	Representative	Party	Dates	Notes	Representative	Party	Dates	Notes	Representative	Party	Dates	Notes	Counties
Ernest Bryan Messer (Canton)	Democratic	January 1, 1973 – January 1, 1983	Redistricted from the 47th district. Redistricted to the 52nd district and retired.	Liston Ramsey (Marshall)	Democratic	January 1, 1973 – January 1, 1983	Redistricted from the 47th district. Redistricted to the 52nd district.									1973–1983; All of Madison, Haywood, Jackson, and Swain counties.
S. L. Beam (Cherryville)	Democratic	January 1, 1983 – January 1, 1985	Redistricted from the 38th district.	D. R. Mauney Jr. (Cherryville)	Democratic	January 1, 1983 – January 1, 1985	Redistricted from the 38th district.	David Bumgardner Jr. (Belmont)	Democratic	January 1, 1983 – January 1, 1989	Redistricted from the 38th district.	J. B. Roberts (Gastonia)	Democratic	January 1, 1983 – January 1, 1985		1983–1993; All of Lincoln and Gaston counties.
Walter Windley III (Gastonia)	Republican	January 1, 1985 – January 1, 1989		Jonathan Rhyne Jr. (Lincolnton)	Republican	January 1, 1985 – January 1, 1993		David Bumgardner Jr. (Belmont)	Democratic	January 1, 1983 – January 1, 1989	Redistricted from the 38th district.	David Noles (Lincolnton)	Republican	January 1, 1985 – January 1, 1987		1983–1993; All of Lincoln and Gaston counties.
Walter Windley III (Gastonia)	Republican	January 1, 1985 – January 1, 1989		Jonathan Rhyne Jr. (Lincolnton)	Republican	January 1, 1985 – January 1, 1993		David Bumgardner Jr. (Belmont)	Democratic	January 1, 1983 – January 1, 1989	Redistricted from the 38th district.	J. Vernon Abernethy (Belmont)	Republican	January 1, 1987 – January 1, 1993		1983–1993; All of Lincoln and Gaston counties.
Doris Lail (Lincolnton)	Republican	January 1, 1989 – January 1, 1991		Jonathan Rhyne Jr. (Lincolnton)	Republican	January 1, 1985 – January 1, 1993		W. W. Dickson (Gastonia)	Republican	January 1, 1989 – January 1, 1993	Redistricted to the 76th district.	J. Vernon Abernethy (Belmont)	Republican	January 1, 1987 – January 1, 1993		1983–1993; All of Lincoln and Gaston counties.
John Gamble Jr. (Lincolnton)	Democratic	January 1, 1991 – January 1, 1993	Redistricted to the single-member district.	Jonathan Rhyne Jr. (Lincolnton)	Republican	January 1, 1985 – January 1, 1993		W. W. Dickson (Gastonia)	Republican	January 1, 1989 – January 1, 1993	Redistricted to the 76th district.	J. Vernon Abernethy (Belmont)	Republican	January 1, 1987 – January 1, 1993		1983–1993; All of Lincoln and Gaston counties.

=== Single-member district ===
Representative	Party	Dates	Notes	Counties
John Gamble Jr. (Lincolnton)	Democratic	January 1, 1993 – January 1, 1999	Redistricted from the multi-member district.	1993–2003; Parts of Lincoln and Gaston counties.
Daniel Barefoot (Lincolnton)	Democratic	January 1, 1999 – January 1, 2003	Redistricted to the 97th district and retired.	1993–2003; Parts of Lincoln and Gaston counties.
Rick Glazier (Fayetteville)	Democratic	January 1, 2003 – January 1, 2005	Redistricted to the 45th district.	2003–Present; Part of Cumberland County.
Margaret Dickson (Fayetteville)	Democratic	January 1, 2005 – January 21, 2010	Redistricted from the 41st district. Resigned to assume seat in the State Senate.	2003–Present; Part of Cumberland County.
Vacant		January 21, 2010 – February 19, 2010		2003–Present; Part of Cumberland County.
Diane Parfitt (Fayetteville)	Democratic	February 19, 2010 – January 1, 2013	Appointed to finish Dickson's term. Retired.	2003–Present; Part of Cumberland County.
Rick Glazier (Fayetteville)	Democratic	January 1, 2013 – August 28, 2015	Redistricted from the 45th district. Resigned.	2003–Present; Part of Cumberland County.
Vacant		August 28, 2015 – September 1, 2015		2003–Present; Part of Cumberland County.
Billy Richardson (Fayetteville)	Democratic	September 1, 2015 – January 1, 2023	Appointed to finish Glazier's term. Retired.	2003–Present; Part of Cumberland County.
Charles Smith (Fayetteville)	Democratic	January 1, 2023 – Present		2003–Present; Part of Cumberland County.

== Election results ==
=== 2024 ===
North Carolina House of Representatives 44th district Libertarian primary election, 2024
Party	Candidate	Votes	%
Libertarian	Christina Aragues	21	55.26%
Libertarian	Angel Yaklin	17	44.74%
Total votes		38	100%

North Carolina House of Representatives 44th district general election, 2024
Party	Candidate	Votes	%
Democratic	Charles Smith (incumbent)	20,941	62.28%
Republican	Freddie de la Cruz	12,683	37.72%
Total votes		33,624	100%
Democratic hold			

=== 2022 ===
North Carolina House of Representatives 44th district Democratic primary election, 2022
Party	Candidate	Votes	%
Democratic	Charles Smith	3,650	61.77%
Democratic	Terry L. Johnson Sr.	2,259	38.23%
Total votes		5,909	100%

North Carolina House of Representatives 44th district general election, 2022
Party	Candidate	Votes	%
Democratic	Charles Smith	14,903	100%
Total votes		14,903	100%
Democratic hold			

=== 2020 ===
North Carolina House of Representatives 44th district Democratic primary election, 2020
Party	Candidate	Votes	%
Democratic	Billy Richardson (incumbent)	5,129	52.10%
Democratic	Terry Johnson	4,715	47.90%
Total votes		9,844	100%

North Carolina House of Representatives 44th district general election, 2020
Party	Candidate	Votes	%
Democratic	Billy Richardson (incumbent)	25,412	71.86%
Republican	Heather S. Holmes	9,950	28.14%
Total votes		35,362	100%
Democratic hold			

=== 2018 ===
North Carolina House of Representatives 44th district Republican primary election, 2018
Party	Candidate	Votes	%
Republican	Linda Devore	1,531	66.89%
Republican	Patrick Petsche	758	33.11%
Total votes		2,289	100%

North Carolina House of Representatives 44th district general election, 2018
Party	Candidate	Votes	%
Democratic	Billy Richardson (incumbent)	13,448	56.56%
Republican	Linda Devore	10,328	43.44%
Total votes		23,776	100%
Democratic hold			

=== 2016 ===
North Carolina House of Representatives 44th district Republican primary election, 2016
Party	Candidate	Votes	%
Republican	Jim Arp	3,409	50.90%
Republican	Richard Button	2,891	43.17%
Republican	Todd Ausborn	397	5.93%
Total votes		6,697	100%

North Carolina House of Representatives 44th district general election, 2016
Party	Candidate	Votes	%
Democratic	Billy Richardson (incumbent)	15,433	50.57%
Republican	Jim Arp	15,086	49.43%
Total votes		30,519	100%
Democratic hold			

=== 2014 ===
North Carolina House of Representatives 44th district general election, 2014
Party	Candidate	Votes	%
Democratic	Rick Glazier (incumbent)	10,171	52.51%
Republican	Richard Button	9,200	47.49%
Total votes		19,371	100%
Democratic hold			

=== 2012 ===
North Carolina House of Representatives 44th district Republican primary election, 2012
Party	Candidate	Votes	%
Republican	Richard D. Button	3,002	65.19%
Republican	John Czajkowski	1,603	34.81%
Total votes		4,605	100%

North Carolina House of Representatives 44th district general election, 2012
Party	Candidate	Votes	%
Democratic	Rick Glazier (incumbent)	17,266	56.31%
Republican	Richard D. Button	13,398	43.69%
Total votes		30,664	100%
Democratic hold			

=== 2010 ===
North Carolina House of Representatives 44th district Republican primary election, 2010
Party	Candidate	Votes	%
Republican	Johnny Dawkins	1,476	56.44%
Republican	Brian Kent	602	23.02%
Republican	Lois A. Kirby	537	20.54%
Total votes		2,615	100%

North Carolina House of Representatives 44th district general election, 2010
Party	Candidate	Votes	%
Democratic	Diane Parfitt (incumbent)	8,189	50.33%
Republican	Johnny Dawkins	8,081	49.67%
Total votes		16,270	100%
Democratic hold			

=== 2008 ===
North Carolina House of Representatives 44th district general election, 2008
Party	Candidate	Votes	%
Democratic	Margaret Dickson (incumbent)	17,260	61.59%
Republican	Lou Huddleston	10,763	38.41%
Total votes		28,023	100%
Democratic hold			

=== 2006 ===
North Carolina House of Representatives 44th district general election, 2006
Party	Candidate	Votes	%
Democratic	Margaret Dickson (incumbent)	8,648	100%
Total votes		8,648	100%
Democratic hold			

=== 2004 ===
North Carolina House of Representatives 44th district general election, 2004
Party	Candidate	Votes	%
Democratic	Margaret Dickson (incumbent)	13,764	58.38%
Republican	Ralph Reagan	9,812	41.62%
Total votes		23,576	100%
Democratic hold			

=== 2002 ===
North Carolina House of Representatives 44th district Republican primary election, 2002
Party	Candidate	Votes	%
Republican	Michael "Mike" Stone	1,512	65.31%
Republican	Don Talbot	803	34.69%
Total votes		2,315	100%

North Carolina House of Representatives 44th district general election, 2002
Party	Candidate	Votes	%
Democratic	Rick Glazier	7,523	53.43%
Republican	Michael Stone	6,556	46.57%
Total votes		14,079	100%
Democratic hold			

=== 2000 ===
North Carolina House of Representatives 44th district general election, 2000
Party	Candidate	Votes	%
Democratic	Daniel Barefoot (incumbent)	10,425	62.15%
Republican	Tom Rogers	6,348	37.85%
Total votes		16,773	100%
Democratic hold			
