= Alex Warner =

American politician from North Carolina

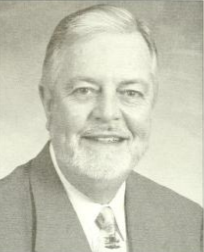
- Warner in the 2003 legislative manual

Member of the North Carolina House of Representatives
- In office January 1, 1987 – January 1, 2005
- Preceded by: William Edward Clark; Henry McMillan Tyson
- Succeeded by: Rick Glazier
- Constituency: 18th District (1987-1993); 75th District (1993-2003); 45th District (2003-2005)

Personal details
- Born: Edward Alexander Warner Jr. November 11, 1942 (age 83) Fayetteville, North Carolina, U.S.
- Party: Democratic (before 2004); Republican (2004–present)
- Education: Campbell University (AB); East Carolina University (MA)
- Profession: Educator

Edward Alexander Warner Jr. (born November 11, 1942) is an American politician who served as a Democratic member of the North Carolina House of Representatives representing the 45th district, including constituents in Cumberland County. A retired educator from Hope Mills, North Carolina, Warner served his ninth and last term in the 2003–2004 session before losing in the Democratic primary to Democratic Representative Rick Glazier. Following his defeat in the Democratic Primary, Warner changed his party affiliation to Republican. He was born in Fayetteville.

== Recent electoral history ==
=== 2006 ===
North Carolina House of Representatives 45th district general election, 2006
Party	Candidate	Votes	%
Democratic	Rick Glazier (incumbent)	6,990	52.30%
Republican	Alex Warner	6,375	47.70%
Total votes		13,365	100%
Democratic hold			

=== 2004 ===
North Carolina House of Representatives 45th district Democratic primary election, 2004
Party	Candidate	Votes	%
Democratic	Rick Glazier (incumbent)	2,227	51.42%
Democratic	Alex Warner (incumbent)	2,104	48.58%
Total votes		4,331	100%

=== 2002 ===
North Carolina House of Representatives 45th district general election, 2002
Party	Candidate	Votes	%
Democratic	Alex Warner (incumbent)	8,039	62.39%
Republican	Robert T. Lawrence	4,847	37.61%
Total votes		12,886	100%
Democratic hold			

=== 2000 ===
North Carolina House of Representatives 75th district general election, 2000
Party	Candidate	Votes	%
Democratic	Alex Warner (incumbent)	11,228	60.54%
Republican	James F. Mabe	7,318	39.46%
Total votes		18,546	100%
Democratic hold			

North Carolina House of Representatives
Preceded by William Edwin Clark; Henry McMillan Tyson	Member of the North Carolina House of Representatives from the 18th district 1987–1993; Served alongside: Rayford Donald Beard, Joseph Bryant Raynor Jr., John William Hurley	Succeeded by Billy Richardson; Kenneth Owen Spears Jr.
Preceded by Constituency established	Member of the North Carolina House of Representatives from the 75th district 1993–2003	Succeeded by Jeff Barnhart
Preceded by Joe Kiser; Mark Hilton	Member of the North Carolina House of Representatives from the 45th district 2003–2005	Succeeded by Rick Glazier
