= Thomas E. Wright =

American politician from North Carolina

Thomas Edward Wright (born August 7, 1955) was a Democratic member of the North Carolina House of Representatives who represented the state's eighteenth district, including constituents in New Hanover and Pender counties, from 1992 to 2008. An EMS instructor from Wilmington, North Carolina, Wright was serving his eighth term in the House when he was expelled from that chamber in 2008. A jury subsequently convicted him of corruption and embezzlement, sending him to jail for a 6-8 year term.

In 2007, the North Carolina State Board of Elections launched an investigation of Wright's campaign finances. The board recommended that Wright be prosecuted. Information revealed in the board's hearings led to calls for Wright to resign.

== Charges ==
Wright was then indicted by a Wake County grand jury "on five charges of obtaining property by false pretenses and one charge of obstruction of justice" on December 10, 2007.

A House committee unanimously found probable cause to proceed on eight counts of misconduct in 2008. Acting on that committee's final recommendations, the full House voted 109–5 to expel Wright on March 20, 2008. He was the first member of the House expelled since Josiah Turner in 1880.

== Verdict ==
A few weeks later, a jury found him guilty and he was sentenced to 6–8 years imprisonment. Wright had filed in the Democratic primary for his old seat, but was removed from the ballot as a result of his conviction; the Constitution of North Carolina, like those of most other states, does not allow convicted felons to hold office. He was released on May 27, 2014, after six years in prison.

North Carolina House of Representatives
| Preceded by Constituency established | Member of the North Carolina House of Representatives from the 98th district 1993–2003 | Succeeded by John Rhodes |
| Preceded by John W. "Bill" Hurley; Mia Morris | Member of the North Carolina House of Representatives from the 18th district 2003–2008 | Succeeded by Sandra Hughes |
