= North Carolina's 45th House district =

American legislative district

North Carolina's 45th State House of Representatives district
Representative
Frances Jackson; D–Fayetteville
- Demographics: 38% White; 38% Black; 14% Hispanic; 3% Asian; 1% Native American; 1% Other; 6% Multiracial
- Population (2024): 82,657

North Carolina's 45th House district is one of 120 districts in the North Carolina House of Representatives. It has been represented by Democrat Frances Jackson since 2023.

== Geography ==
Since 2003, the district has included part of Cumberland County. The district overlaps with the 19th and 21st Senate districts.

== District officeholders since 1967 ==
=== Multi-member district ===
Representative	Party	Dates	Notes	Representative	Party	Dates	Notes	Representative	Party	Dates	Notes	Representative	Party	Dates	Notes	Counties
District created January 1, 1967.
Gordon Greenwood (Black Mountain)	Democratic	January 1, 1967 – January 1, 1969	Redistricted from the Buncombe County district.	Herschel Harkins (Asheville)	Democratic	January 1, 1967 – January 1, 1973	Redistricted to the 43rd district.	C. Edley Hutchins (Black Mountain)	Republican	January 1, 1967 – January 1, 1969		David Jordan (Asheville)	Republican	January 1, 1967 – January 1, 1969		1967–1973; All of Buncombe and McDowell counties.
Claude DeBruhl (Candler)	Democratic	January 1, 1969 – January 1, 1973	Redistricted to the 43rd district.	Herschel Harkins (Asheville)	Democratic	January 1, 1967 – January 1, 1973	Redistricted to the 43rd district.	Hugh Beam (Marion)	Democratic	January 1, 1969 – January 1, 1973	Redistricted to the 41st district and retired.	John Stevens (Asheville)	Democratic	January 1, 1969 – January 1, 1973	Redistricted to the 43rd district.	1967–1973; All of Buncombe and McDowell counties.

=== Single-member district ===
Representative	Party	Dates	Notes	Counties
Bill Bradley (Hayesville)	Republican	January 1, 1973 – January 1, 1975		1973–1983; All of Cherokee, Clay, Macon, and Graham counties.
Jeff Enloe Jr. (Franklin)	Democratic	January 1, 1975 – January 1, 1983	Redistricted to the 53rd district.	1973–1983; All of Cherokee, Clay, Macon, and Graham counties.

=== Multi-member district ===
Representative	Party	Dates	Notes	Representative	Party	Dates	Notes	Counties
Austin Allran (Hickory)	Republican	January 1, 1983 – January 1, 1987	Redistricted from the 37th district. Retired to run for State Senate.	Julius Reid Poovey (Hickory)	Republican	January 1, 1983 – January 1, 1985	Redistricted from the 37th district.	1983–1993; Parts of Catawba and Burke counties.
Austin Allran (Hickory)	Republican	January 1, 1983 – January 1, 1987	Redistricted from the 37th district. Retired to run for State Senate.	Doris Rogers Huffman (Newton)	Republican	January 1, 1985 – January 1, 1993	Retired to run for Lieutenant Governor.	1983–1993; Parts of Catawba and Burke counties.
Walter Stine Isenhower (Conover)	Republican	January 1, 1987 – January 1, 1993		Doris Rogers Huffman (Newton)	Republican	January 1, 1985 – January 1, 1993	Retired to run for Lieutenant Governor.	1983–1993; Parts of Catawba and Burke counties.
Charles Preston (Conover)	Republican	January 1, 1993 – January 1, 1995		Cherie Berry (Newton)	Republican	January 1, 1993 – January 1, 2001	Retired to run for Labor Commissioner.	1993–2003; Parts of Catawba, Lincoln, and Gaston counties.
Joe Kiser (Vale)	Republican	January 1, 1995 – January 1, 2003	Redistricted to the 97th district.	Cherie Berry (Newton)	Republican	January 1, 1993 – January 1, 2001	Retired to run for Labor Commissioner.	1993–2003; Parts of Catawba, Lincoln, and Gaston counties.
Joe Kiser (Vale)	Republican	January 1, 1995 – January 1, 2003	Redistricted to the 97th district.	Mark Hilton (Conover)	Republican	January 1, 2001 – January 1, 2003	Redistricted to the 88th district.	1993–2003; Parts of Catawba, Lincoln, and Gaston counties.

=== Single-member district ===
Representative	Party	Dates	Notes	Counties
Alex Warner (Hope Mills)	Democratic	January 1, 2003 – January 1, 2005	Redistricted from the 75th district. Lost re-nomination.	2003–Present; Part of Cumberland County.
Rick Glazier (Fayetteville)	Democratic	January 1, 2005 – January 1, 2013	Redistricted from the 44th district. Redistricted to the 44th district.	2003–Present; Part of Cumberland County.
John Szoka (Fayetteville)	Republican	January 1, 2013 – January 1, 2023	Retired to run for the Cumberland County Board of Commissioners.	2003–Present; Part of Cumberland County.
Frances Jackson (Fayetteville)	Democratic	January 1, 2023 – Present		2003–Present; Part of Cumberland County.

== Election results ==
=== 2026 ===
North Carolina House of Representatives 45th district Democratic primary election, 2026
Party	Candidate	Votes	%
Democratic	Frances Jackson (incumbent)	3,373	60.02%
Democratic	QuDerrick Covington	2,247	39.98%
Total votes		5,620	100%

North Carolina House of Representatives 45th district general election, 2026
Party	Candidate	Votes	%
Democratic	Frances Jackson (incumbent)		100%
Total votes			100%
Democratic hold			

=== 2024 ===
North Carolina House of Representatives 45th district general election, 2024
Party	Candidate	Votes	%
Democratic	Frances Jackson (incumbent)	25,090	100%
Total votes		25,090	100%
Democratic hold			

=== 2022 ===
North Carolina House of Representatives 45th district Democratic primary election, 2022
Party	Candidate	Votes	%
Democratic	Frances Jackson	2,228	52.45%
Democratic	Chris Davis	1,746	41.10%
Democratic	Keith Byrd	274	6.45%
Total votes		4,248	100%

North Carolina House of Representatives 45th district general election, 2022
Party	Candidate	Votes	%
Democratic	Frances Jackson	11,148	55.16%
Republican	Susan Chapman	9,064	44.84%
Total votes		20,212	100%
Democratic gain from Republican			

=== 2020 ===
North Carolina House of Representatives 45th district Democratic primary election, 2020
Party	Candidate	Votes	%
Democratic	Frances Jackson	5,313	69.12%
Democratic	Keith Byrd	2,374	30.88%
Total votes		7,687	100%

North Carolina House of Representatives 45th district general election, 2020
Party	Candidate	Votes	%
Republican	John Szoka (incumbent)	20,260	50.88%
Democratic	Frances Jackson	19,557	49.12%
Total votes		39,817	100%
Republican hold			

=== 2018 ===
North Carolina House of Representatives 45th district general election, 2018
Party	Candidate	Votes	%
Republican	John Szoka (incumbent)	17,280	58.36%
Democratic	Albeiro "Al" Florez	12,330	41.64%
Total votes		29,610	100%
Republican hold			

=== 2016 ===
North Carolina House of Representatives 45th district general election, 2016
Party	Candidate	Votes	%
Republican	John Szoka (incumbent)	23,495	100%
Total votes		23,495	100%
Republican hold			

=== 2014 ===
North Carolina House of Representatives 45th district general election, 2014
Party	Candidate	Votes	%
Republican	John Szoka (incumbent)	12,813	100%
Total votes		12,813	100%
Republican hold			

=== 2012 ===
North Carolina House of Representatives 45th district Republican primary election, 2012
Party	Candidate	Votes	%
Republican	John Szoka	3,093	57.72%
Republican	Diane Wheatley	2,266	42.28%
Total votes		5,359	100%

North Carolina House of Representatives 45th district general election, 2012
Party	Candidate	Votes	%
Republican	John Szoka	16,208	56.40%
Democratic	Eddie Dees	12,532	43.60%
Total votes		28,740	100%
Republican win (new seat)			

=== 2010 ===
North Carolina House of Representatives 45th district Democratic primary election, 2010
Party	Candidate	Votes	%
Democratic	Rick Glazier (incumbent)	2,714	73.13%
Democratic	Tina Odom	997	26.87%
Total votes		3,711	100%

North Carolina House of Representatives 45th district Republican primary election, 2010
Party	Candidate	Votes	%
Republican	Jackie Warner	1,132	58.47%
Republican	Patrick Mitchell	804	41.53%
Total votes		1,936	100%

North Carolina House of Representatives 45th district general election, 2010
Party	Candidate	Votes	%
Democratic	Rick Glazier (incumbent)	9,858	50.12%
Republican	Jackie Warner	9,812	49.88%
Total votes		19,670	100%
Democratic hold			

=== 2008 ===
North Carolina House of Representatives 45th district general election, 2008
Party	Candidate	Votes	%
Democratic	Rick Glazier (incumbent)	24,225	100%
Total votes		24,225	100%
Democratic hold			

=== 2006 ===
North Carolina House of Representatives 45th district general election, 2006
Party	Candidate	Votes	%
Democratic	Rick Glazier (incumbent)	6,990	52.30%
Republican	Alex Warner	6,375	47.70%
Total votes		13,365	100%
Democratic hold			

=== 2004 ===
North Carolina House of Representatives 45th district Democratic primary election, 2004
Party	Candidate	Votes	%
Democratic	Rick Glazier (incumbent)	2,227	51.42%
Democratic	Alex Warner (incumbent)	2,104	48.58%
Total votes		4,331	100%

North Carolina House of Representatives 45th district general election, 2004
Party	Candidate	Votes	%
Democratic	Rick Glazier (incumbent)	15,100	60.16%
Republican	Robert T. Lawrence	10,001	39.84%
Total votes		25,101	100%
Democratic hold			

=== 2002 ===
North Carolina House of Representatives 45th district general election, 2002
Party	Candidate	Votes	%
Democratic	Alex Warner (incumbent)	8,039	62.39%
Republican	Robert T. Lawrence	4,847	37.61%
Total votes		12,886	100%
Democratic hold			

=== 2000 ===
North Carolina House of Representatives 45th district Republican primary election, 2000
Party	Candidate	Votes	%
Republican	Joe Kiser (incumbent)	4,467	41.42%
Republican	Mark Hilton	3,597	33.35%
Republican	Ray Hoyle	2,722	25.24%
Total votes		10,786	100%

North Carolina House of Representatives 45th district general election, 2000
Party	Candidate	Votes	%
Republican	Joe Kiser (incumbent)	30,639	32.75%
Republican	Mark Hilton	29,812	31.87%
Democratic	David Clark Jr.	19,419	20.76%
Democratic	Columbus J. Turner	13,679	14.62%
Total votes		93,549	100%
Republican hold			
Republican hold			
