= North Carolina's 91st House district =

American legislative district

North Carolina's 91st State House of Representatives district
Representative
Kyle Hall; R–King
- Demographics: 71% White; 15% Black; 9% Hispanic; 1% Other; 3% Multiracial
- Population (2024): 85,670

North Carolina's 91st House district is one of 120 districts in the North Carolina House of Representatives. It has been represented by Republican Kyle Hall since 2015.

== Geography ==
Since 2023, the district has included all of Stokes County, as well as part of Forsyth County. The district overlaps with the 31st Senate district.

== District officeholders ==
Representative	Party	Dates	Notes	Counties
District created January 1, 1993.
George Robinson (Cedar Rock)	Republican	January 1, 1993 – January 1, 1997	Redistricted from the 46th district.	1993–2003; Parts of Caldwell, Alexander, and Catawba counties.
Edgar Starnes (Granite Falls)	Republican	January 1, 1997 – January 1, 2003	Redistricted to the 87th district.	1993–2003; Parts of Caldwell, Alexander, and Catawba counties.
Rex Baker (King)	Republican	January 1, 2003 – January 1, 2005	Redistricted from the 40th district. Lost re-nomination.	2003–2005; All of Stokes County. Part of Surry County.
Bryan Holloway (King)	Republican	January 1, 2005 – October 23, 2015	Resigned.	2005–2019; All of Stokes County. Part of Rockingham County.
Vacant		October 23, 2015 – November 9, 2015		2005–2019; All of Stokes County. Part of Rockingham County.
Kyle Hall (King)	Republican	November 9, 2015 – Present	Appointed to finish Holloway's term.	2005–2019; All of Stokes County. Part of Rockingham County.
Kyle Hall (King)	Republican	November 9, 2015 – Present	Appointed to finish Holloway's term.	2019–2023; All of Stokes County. Parts of Surry and Rockingham counties.
Kyle Hall (King)	Republican	November 9, 2015 – Present	Appointed to finish Holloway's term.	2023–Present; All of Stokes County. Part of Forsyth County.

== Election results ==
=== 2024 ===
North Carolina House of Representatives 91st district general election, 2024
Party	Candidate	Votes	%
Republican	Kyle Hall (incumbent)	29,819	67.16%
Democratic	Vivian Fulk	14,583	32.84%
Total votes		44,402	100%
Republican hold			

=== 2022 ===
North Carolina House of Representatives 91st district Republican primary election, 2022
Party	Candidate	Votes	%
Republican	Kyle Hall (incumbent)	7,761	82.99%
Republican	James Douglas	977	10.45%
Republican	Stephen L. James	614	6.57%
Total votes		9,352	100%

North Carolina House of Representatives 91st district general election, 2022
Party	Candidate	Votes	%
Republican	Kyle Hall (incumbent)	26,304	100%
Total votes		26,304	100%
Republican hold			

=== 2020 ===
North Carolina House of Representatives 91st district general election, 2020
Party	Candidate	Votes	%
Republican	Kyle Hall (incumbent)	33,534	78.38%
Democratic	Rita Cruise	9,252	21.62%
Total votes		42,786	100%
Republican hold			

=== 2018 ===
North Carolina House of Representatives 91st district general election, 2018
Party	Candidate	Votes	%
Republican	Kyle Hall (incumbent)	21,232	73.24%
Democratic	Michael Booth	7,134	24.61%
Libertarian	Steve Brenneis	623	2.15%
Total votes		28,989	100%
Republican hold			

=== 2016 ===
North Carolina House of Representatives 91st district Republican primary election, 2016
Party	Candidate	Votes	%
Republican	Kyle Hall	4,898	43.84%
Republican	Robert Knight	3,427	30.67%
Republican	Ira "Bubba" Tilley	2,848	25.49%
Total votes		11,173	100%

North Carolina House of Representatives 91st district general election, 2016
Party	Candidate	Votes	%
Republican	Kyle Hall (incumbent)	24,639	66.47%
Democratic	Eugene Russell	12,430	33.53%
Total votes		37,069	100%
Republican hold			

=== 2014 ===
North Carolina House of Representatives 91st district general election, 2014
Party	Candidate	Votes	%
Republican	Bryan Holloway (incumbent)	18,443	100%
Total votes		18,443	100%
Republican hold			

=== 2012 ===
North Carolina House of Representatives 91st district general election, 2012
Party	Candidate	Votes	%
Republican	Bryan Holloway (incumbent)	22,417	61.00%
Democratic	Nelson Cole	14,334	39.00%
Total votes		36,751	100%
Republican hold			

=== 2010 ===
North Carolina House of Representatives 91st district general election, 2010
Party	Candidate	Votes	%
Republican	Bryan Holloway (incumbent)	16,153	75.38%
Democratic	Ed Gambill	5,275	24.62%
Total votes		21,428	100%
Republican hold			

=== 2008 ===
North Carolina House of Representatives 91st district general election, 2008
Party	Candidate	Votes	%
Republican	Bryan Holloway (incumbent)	21,338	65.48%
Democratic	Ed Gambill	11,251	34.52%
Total votes		32,589	100%
Republican hold			

=== 2006 ===
North Carolina House of Representatives 91st district general election, 2006
Party	Candidate	Votes	%
Republican	Bryan Holloway (incumbent)	10,295	61.61%
Democratic	Ed Gambill	6,416	38.39%
Total votes		16,711	100%
Republican hold			

=== 2004 ===
North Carolina House of Representatives 91st district Republican primary election, 2004
Party	Candidate	Votes	%
Republican	Bryan Holloway	2,584	53.73%
Republican	Rex Baker (incumbent)	2,225	46.27%
Total votes		4,809	100%

North Carolina House of Representatives 91st district general election, 2004
Party	Candidate	Votes	%
Republican	Bryan Holloway	16,870	57.38%
Democratic	Robert W. Mitchell	12,533	42.62%
Total votes		29,403	100%
Republican hold			

=== 2002 ===
North Carolina House of Representatives 91st district Republican primary election, 2002
Party	Candidate	Votes	%
Republican	Rex Baker (incumbent)	2,880	58.57%
Republican	Barry Lawson	2,037	41.43%
Total votes		4,917	100%

North Carolina House of Representatives 91st district general election, 2002
Party	Candidate	Votes	%
Republican	Rex Baker (incumbent)	10,548	56.81%
Democratic	Robert W. Mitchell	8,019	43.19%
Total votes		18,567	100%
Republican hold			

=== 2000 ===
North Carolina House of Representatives 91st district general election, 2000
Party	Candidate	Votes	%
Republican	Edgar Starnes (incumbent)	15,050	85.98%
Libertarian	Joe Young	2,454	14.02%
Total votes		17,504	100%
Republican hold			
