= Calvary Christian School =

Calvary Christian School may refer to these schools in the United States:

- Trinity Christian High School (Monterey, California), formerly known as Calvary Christian High School
- Calvary Christian High School (Clearwater, Florida)
- Calvary Christian School (Covington, Kentucky)
- Calvary Christian School (King, North Carolina)
