= North Carolina's 46th House district =

American legislative district

North Carolina's 46th State House of Representatives district
Representative
Brenden Jones; R–Tabor City
- Demographics: 50% White; 25% Black; 11% Hispanic; 9% Native American; 4% Multiracial
- Population (2024): 83,271

North Carolina's 46th House district is one of 120 districts in the North Carolina House of Representatives. It has been represented by Republican Brenden Jones since 2017.

== Geography ==
Since 2023, the district has included all of Columbus County, as well as part of Robeson County. The district overlaps with the 8th and 24th Senate districts.

== District officeholders ==
=== Multi-member district ===
Representative	Party	Dates	Notes	Representative	Party	Dates	Notes	Representative	Party	Dates	Notes	Counties
District created January 1, 1983.
James Frank Hughes (Linville)	Republican	January 1, 1983 – January 1, 1989	Redistricted from the 39th district.	Swan Burnett Lacey Jr. (Newland)	Republican	January 1, 1983 – January 1, 1985	Redistricted from the 39th district.	George Robinson (Cedar Rock)	Republican	January 1, 1983 – January 1, 1987	Redistricted from the 34th district. Retired to run for Congress.	1983–1993; All of Mitchell and Avery counties. Parts of Watauga, Caldwell, Burke, and Alexander counties.
James Frank Hughes (Linville)	Republican	January 1, 1983 – January 1, 1989	Redistricted from the 39th district.	Charles Buchanan (Green Mountain)	Republican	January 1, 1985 – January 1, 1993		George Robinson (Cedar Rock)	Republican	January 1, 1983 – January 1, 1987	Redistricted from the 34th district. Retired to run for Congress.	1983–1993; All of Mitchell and Avery counties. Parts of Watauga, Caldwell, Burke, and Alexander counties.
James Frank Hughes (Linville)	Republican	January 1, 1983 – January 1, 1989	Redistricted from the 39th district.	Charles Buchanan (Green Mountain)	Republican	January 1, 1985 – January 1, 1993		Edgar Starnes (Granite Falls)	Republican	January 1, 1987 – January 1, 1989		1983–1993; All of Mitchell and Avery counties. Parts of Watauga, Caldwell, Burke, and Alexander counties.
David Flaherty (Lenoir)	Republican	January 1, 1989 – January 1, 1995		Charles Buchanan (Green Mountain)	Republican	January 1, 1985 – January 1, 1993		George Robinson (Cedar Rock)	Republican	January 1, 1989 – January 1, 1993	Redistricted to the 91st district.	1983–1993; All of Mitchell and Avery counties. Parts of Watauga, Caldwell, Burke, and Alexander counties.
David Flaherty (Lenoir)	Republican	January 1, 1989 – January 1, 1995		Gregg Thompson (Spruce Pine)	Republican	January 1, 1993 – January 1, 2003	Redistricted to the 84th district and retired to run for State Senate.					1993–2003; All of Mitchell and Avery counties. Parts of Caldwell, Burke, and Catawba counties.
Charles Buchanan (Green Mountain)	Republican	January 1, 1995 – January 1, 2003	Redistricted to the 84th district and lost re-nomination.	Gregg Thompson (Spruce Pine)	Republican	January 1, 1993 – January 1, 2003	Redistricted to the 84th district and retired to run for State Senate.					1993–2003; All of Mitchell and Avery counties. Parts of Caldwell, Burke, and Catawba counties.

=== Single-member district ===
Representative	Party	Dates	Notes	Counties
Douglas Yongue (Laurinburg)	Democratic	January 1, 2003 – January 1, 2011	Redistricted from the 16th district Lost re-election.	2003–2013; Parts of Robeson, Hoke, and Scotland counties.
Gaston (G. L.) Pridgen (Lumberton)	Republican	January 1, 2011 – January 1, 2013	Lost re-election.	2003–2013; Parts of Robeson, Hoke, and Scotland counties.
Ken Waddell (Chadbourn)	Democratic	January 1, 2013 – January 1, 2017	Retired.	2013–2019; All of Columbus County. Parts of Robeson and Bladen counties.
Brenden Jones (Tabor City)	Republican	January 1, 2017 – Present		2013–2019; All of Columbus County. Parts of Robeson and Bladen counties.
Brenden Jones (Tabor City)	Republican	January 1, 2017 – Present		2019–2023; Parts of Columbus and Robeson counties.
Brenden Jones (Tabor City)	Republican	January 1, 2017 – Present		2023–Present; All of Columbus County. Part of Robeson County.

== Election results ==
=== 2024 ===
North Carolina House of Representatives 46th district general election, 2024
Party	Candidate	Votes	%
Republican	Brenden Jones (incumbent)	29,064	100%
Total votes		29,064	100%
Republican hold			

=== 2022 ===
North Carolina House of Representatives 46th district general election, 2022
Party	Candidate	Votes	%
Republican	Brenden Jones (incumbent)	19,928	100%
Total votes		19,928	100%
Republican hold			

=== 2020 ===
North Carolina House of Representatives 46th district general election, 2020
Party	Candidate	Votes	%
Republican	Brenden Jones (incumbent)	17,555	60.69%
Democratic	Tim Heath	11,369	39.31%
Total votes		28,924	100%
Republican hold			

=== 2018 ===
North Carolina House of Representatives 46th district general election, 2018
Party	Candidate	Votes	%
Republican	Brenden Jones (incumbent)	12,687	63.35%
Democratic	Barbara S. Yates-Lockamy	7,339	36.65%
Total votes		20,026	100%
Republican hold			

=== 2016 ===
North Carolina House of Representatives 46th district general election, 2016
Party	Candidate	Votes	%
Republican	Brenden Jones	19,607	60.34%
Democratic	Tim Benton	11,836	36.42%
Libertarian	Thomas Howell Jr.	1,052	3.24%
Total votes		32,495	100%
Republican gain from Democratic			

=== 2014 ===
North Carolina House of Representatives 46th district general election, 2014
Party	Candidate	Votes	%
Democratic	Ken Waddell (incumbent)	11,551	53.42%
Republican	Brenden Jones	10,073	46.58%
Total votes		21,624	100%
Democratic hold			

=== 2012 ===
North Carolina House of Representatives 46th district Democratic primary election, 2012
Party	Candidate	Votes	%
Democratic	Ken Waddell	7,083	54.71%
Democratic	Al Leonard Jr.	5,863	45.29%
Total votes		12,946	100%

North Carolina House of Representatives 46th district general election, 2012
Party	Candidate	Votes	%
Democratic	Ken Waddell	18,160	54.06%
Republican	Gaston (G. L.) Pridgen (incumbent)	15,431	45.94%
Total votes		33,591	100%
Democratic gain from Republican			

=== 2010 ===
North Carolina House of Representatives 46th district general election, 2010
Party	Candidate	Votes	%
Republican	Gaston (G. L.) Pridgen	7,590	52.17%
Democratic	Douglas Yongue (incumbent)	6,958	47.83%
Total votes		14,548	100%
Republican gain from Democratic			

=== 2008 ===
North Carolina House of Representatives 46th district general election, 2008
Party	Candidate	Votes	%
Democratic	Douglas Yongue (incumbent)	18,275	100%
Total votes		18,275	100%
Democratic hold			

=== 2006 ===
North Carolina House of Representatives 46th district general election, 2006
Party	Candidate	Votes	%
Democratic	Douglas Yongue (incumbent)	7,684	100%
Total votes		7,684	100%
Democratic hold			

=== 2004 ===
North Carolina House of Representatives 46th district general election, 2004
Party	Candidate	Votes	%
Democratic	Douglas Yongue (incumbent)	12,913	100%
Total votes		12,913	100%
Democratic hold			

=== 2002 ===
North Carolina House of Representatives 46th district general election, 2002
Party	Candidate	Votes	%
Democratic	Douglas Yongue (incumbent)	6,920	63.50%
Republican	C. Linwood Faulk	3,978	36.50%
Total votes		10,898	100%
Democratic hold			

=== 2000 ===
North Carolina House of Representatives 46th district general election, 2000
Party	Candidate	Votes	%
Republican	Charles Buchanan (incumbent)	28,274	40.33%
Republican	Gregg Thompson (incumbent)	26,573	37.90%
Democratic	Joe Delk	15,267	21.78%
Total votes		7,011	100%
Republican hold			
Republican hold			
