= North Carolina's 87th House district =

American legislative district

North Carolina's 87th State House of Representatives district
Representative
Destin Hall; R–Granite Falls
- Demographics: 86% White; 4% Black; 7% Hispanic; 1% Asian; 3% Multiracial
- Population (2024): 85,401

North Carolina's 87th House district is one of 120 districts in the North Carolina House of Representatives. It has been represented by Republican Destin Hall since 2017.

== Geography ==
Since 2023, the district has included all of Caldwell County, as well as part of Watauga County. The district overlaps with the 45th and 47th Senate districts.

== District officeholders ==
Representative	Party	Dates	Notes	Counties
District created January 1, 1993.
Frances Cummings (Lumberton)	Democratic	January 1, 1993 – January 25, 1995	Switched parties. Lost re-election.	1993–2003; Parts of Hoke, Scotland, and Robeson counties.
Frances Cummings (Lumberton)	Republican	January 25, 1995 – January 1, 1997	Switched parties. Lost re-election.	1993–2003; Parts of Hoke, Scotland, and Robeson counties.
Donald Bonner (Rowland)	Democratic	January 1, 1997 – January 1, 2003	Redistricted to the 48th district.	1993–2003; Parts of Hoke, Scotland, and Robeson counties.
Edgar Starnes (Granite Falls)	Republican	January 1, 2003 – January 13, 2015	Redistricted from the 91st district. Resigned.	2003–2005; All of Alexander County. Part of Caldwell County.
Edgar Starnes (Granite Falls)	Republican	January 1, 2003 – January 13, 2015	Redistricted from the 91st district. Resigned.	2005–2013; Part of Caldwell County.
Edgar Starnes (Granite Falls)	Republican	January 1, 2003 – January 13, 2015	Redistricted from the 91st district. Resigned.	2013–2023; All of Caldwell County.
Vacant		January 13, 2015 – February 2, 2015		2013–2023; All of Caldwell County.
George Robinson (Cedar Rock)	Republican	February 2, 2015 – January 1, 2017	Appointed to finish Starnes' term. Lost re-nomination.	2013–2023; All of Caldwell County.
Destin Hall (Granite Falls)	Republican	January 1, 2017 – Present		2013–2023; All of Caldwell County.
Destin Hall (Granite Falls)	Republican	January 1, 2017 – Present		2023–Present; All of Caldwell County. Part of Watauga County.

== Election results ==
=== 2024 ===
North Carolina House of Representatives 87th district general election, 2024
Party	Candidate	Votes	%
Republican	Destin Hall (incumbent)	34,187	75.42%
Democratic	Barbara Kirby	11,142	24.58%
Total votes		45,329	100%
Republican hold			

=== 2022 ===
North Carolina House of Representatives 87th district general election, 2022
Party	Candidate	Votes	%
Republican	Destin Hall (incumbent)	22,864	76.21%
Democratic	Barbara Kirby	7,139	23.79%
Total votes		30,003	100%
Republican hold			

=== 2020 ===
North Carolina House of Representatives 87th district general election, 2020
Party	Candidate	Votes	%
Republican	Destin Hall (incumbent)	31,830	76.93%
Democratic	Corie Schreiber	9,544	23.07%
Total votes		41,374	100%
Republican hold			

=== 2018 ===
North Carolina House of Representatives 87th district general election, 2018
Party	Candidate	Votes	%
Republican	Destin Hall (incumbent)	19,031	72.86%
Democratic	Amanda Bregel	7,089	27.14%
Total votes		26,120	100%
Republican hold			

=== 2016 ===
North Carolina House of Representatives 87th district Republican primary election, 2016
Party	Candidate	Votes	%
Republican	Destin Hall	6,827	59.74%
Republican	George Robinson (incumbent)	4,600	40.26%
Total votes		11,427	100%

North Carolina House of Representatives 87th district general election, 2016
Party	Candidate	Votes	%
Republican	Destin Hall	29,066	94.14%
Independent	Terri M. Johnson (write-in)	1,279	4.14%
Write-in		531	1.72%
Total votes		30,876	100%
Republican hold			

=== 2014 ===
North Carolina House of Representatives 87th district general election, 2014
Party	Candidate	Votes	%
Republican	Edgar Starnes (incumbent)	16,148	100%
Total votes		16,148	100%
Republican hold			

=== 2012 ===
North Carolina House of Representatives 87th district Republican primary election, 2012
Party	Candidate	Votes	%
Republican	Edgar Starnes (incumbent)	8,472	70.07%
Republican	Jordon Greene	3,619	29.93%
Total votes		12,091	100%

North Carolina House of Representatives 87th district general election, 2012
Party	Candidate	Votes	%
Republican	Edgar Starnes (incumbent)	25,757	100%
Total votes		25,757	100%
Republican hold			

=== 2010 ===
North Carolina House of Representatives 87th district general election, 2010
Party	Candidate	Votes	%
Republican	Edgar Starnes (incumbent)	14,295	100%
Total votes		14,295	100%
Republican hold			

=== 2008 ===
North Carolina House of Representatives 87th district general election, 2008
Party	Candidate	Votes	%
Republican	Edgar Starnes (incumbent)	15,444	52.76%
Democratic	John A. Forlines Jr.	11,487	39.24%
Libertarian	Timothy J. "T. J." Rohr	2,342	8.00%
Total votes		29,273	100%
Republican hold			

=== 2006 ===
North Carolina House of Representatives 87th district general election, 2006
Party	Candidate	Votes	%
Republican	Edgar Starnes (incumbent)	11,548	100%
Total votes		11,548	100%
Republican hold			

=== 2004 ===
North Carolina House of Representatives 87th district Democratic primary election, 2004
Party	Candidate	Votes	%
Democratic	Woody Tucker	1,301	70.29%
Democratic	Larry K. Clark	550	29.71%
Total votes		1,851	100%

North Carolina House of Representatives 87th district general election, 2004
Party	Candidate	Votes	%
Republican	Edgar Starnes (incumbent)	15,519	59.84%
Democratic	Woody Tucker	10,415	40.16%
Total votes		25,934	100%
Republican hold			

=== 2002 ===
North Carolina House of Representatives 87th district general election, 2002
Party	Candidate	Votes	%
Republican	Edgar Starnes (incumbent)	11,813	51.48%
Democratic	Ray Warren	11,132	48.52%
Total votes		22,945	100%
Republican hold			

=== 2000 ===
North Carolina House of Representatives 87th district Democratic primary election, 2000
Party	Candidate	Votes	%
Democratic	Donald Bonner (incumbent)	5,470	77.57%
Democratic	Rusty Perry	1,582	22.43%
Total votes		7,052	100%

North Carolina House of Representatives 87th district general election, 2000
Party	Candidate	Votes	%
Democratic	Donald Bonner (incumbent)	12,755	100%
Total votes		12,755	100%
Democratic hold			
