= Bryan R. Holloway =

American politician (born 1977)

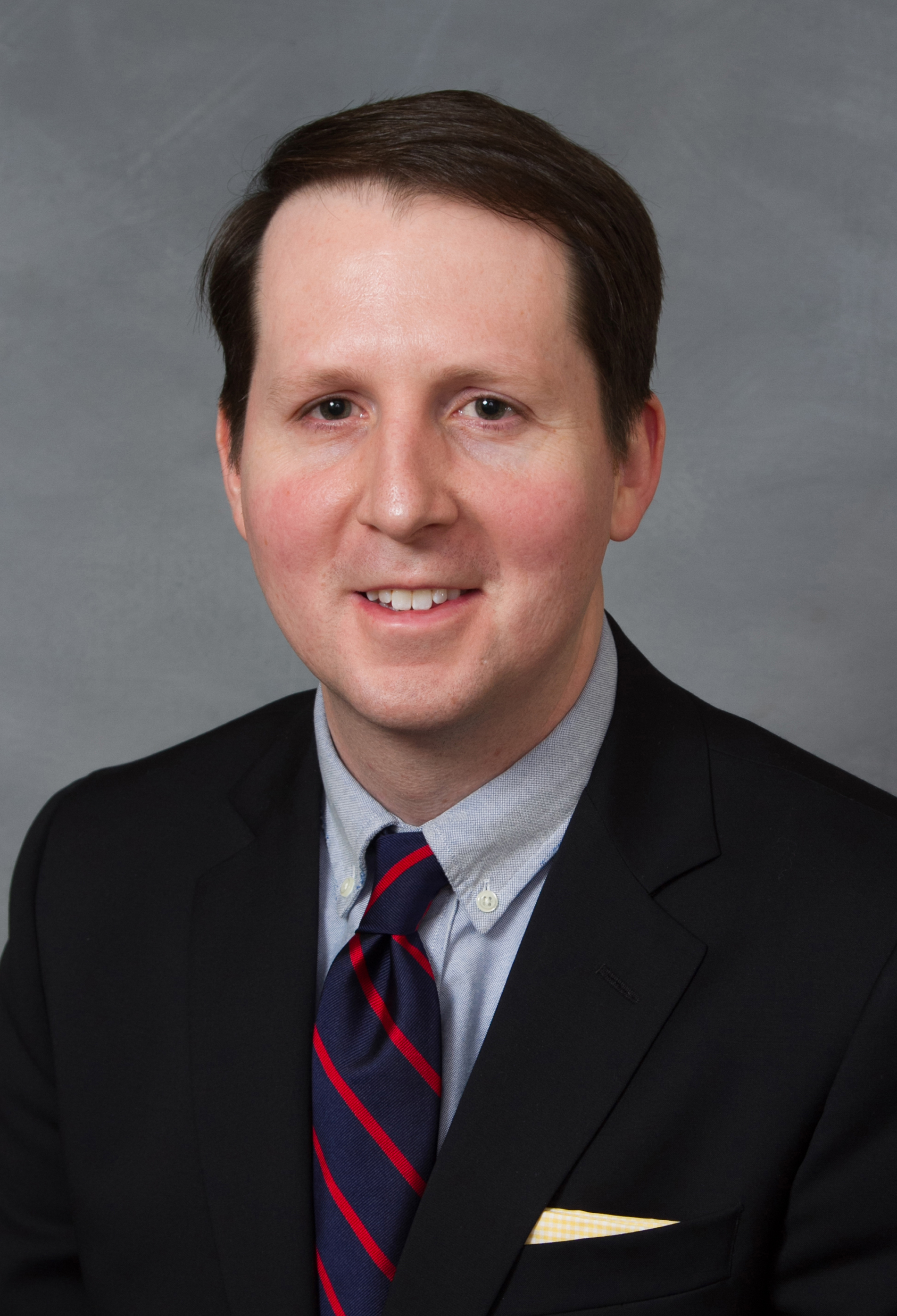
- Holloway in 2013

Member of the North Carolina House of Representatives from the 91st district
- In office January 1, 2005 – October 23, 2015
- Preceded by: Rex Baker
- Succeeded by: Kyle Hall

Personal details
- Born: October 16, 1977 (age 48)
- Party: Republican
- Spouse: Misti
- Education: Appalachian State University (BS)
- Website: http://www.bryanholloway.org

Bryan R. Holloway is an American politician. He served five and a half two-year terms as a representative from the 91st District (Stokes and Rockingham Counties) in the North Carolina General Assembly. Holloway resigned from his seat in 2015 to become a lobbyist. He currently operates from his own firm, Holloway Group Inc.

During his tenure, Rep. Holloway served as the co-chairman of the powerful Appropriations Committee and as chairman of the legislature's Education Oversight Committee. In his first term, Holloway served as the Republican Freshman Leader. In 2014, he made an unsuccessful run for Speaker of the House.

Prior to his election in 2004, Holloway was a social studies teacher at West Stokes High School. Holloway defeated incumbent Rex Baker in the 2004 Republican Primary and Robert Mitchell, a fellow West Stokes High School teacher, in the 2004 General Election. Holloway easily won re-election against Democrat Ed Gambill in 2006, 2008, and 2010. In 2012, he defeated former NC House Representative Nelson Cole. He was re-elected without opposition in 2014.

== Education and personal life ==
Holloway is a graduate of Appalachian State University. He is a member of Calvary Baptist Church in King, North Carolina and resides in King with his wife, Misti, and their dog, Governor.

=== Fashion blogger ===
In May 2013, the popular menswear blog Ivy Style claimed that Holloway maintained a fashion blog (deleted shortly afterward) called "Wasp 101".

The post pointed out a number of similarities and coincidences between the writer (known as "Richard") and the politician: they are the same age and have the same birthday, both work in North Carolina politics, have a Dachshund called Governor and Richard is Holloway's middle name. The post also pointed out that photos of the second writer on the blog, "Kipp," bear a strong resemblance to Holloway's legislative assistant.

Holloway has denied that he was the author of the blog.

== Electoral history ==
=== 2014 ===
North Carolina House of Representatives 91st district general election, 2014
Party	Candidate	Votes	%
Republican	Bryan Holloway (incumbent)	18,443	100%
Total votes		18,443	100%
Republican hold			

=== 2012 ===
North Carolina House of Representatives 91st district general election, 2012
Party	Candidate	Votes	%
Republican	Bryan Holloway (incumbent)	22,417	61.00%
Democratic	Nelson Cole	14,334	39.00%
Total votes		36,751	100%
Republican hold			

=== 2010 ===
North Carolina House of Representatives 91st district general election, 2010
Party	Candidate	Votes	%
Republican	Bryan Holloway (incumbent)	16,153	75.38%
Democratic	Ed Gambill	5,275	24.62%
Total votes		21,428	100%
Republican hold			

=== 2008 ===
North Carolina House of Representatives 91st district general election, 2008
Party	Candidate	Votes	%
Republican	Bryan Holloway (incumbent)	21,338	65.48%
Democratic	Ed Gambill	11,251	34.52%
Total votes		32,589	100%
Republican hold			

=== 2006 ===
North Carolina House of Representatives 91st district general election, 2006
Party	Candidate	Votes	%
Republican	Bryan Holloway (incumbent)	10,295	61.61%
Democratic	Ed Gambill	6,416	38.39%
Total votes		16,711	100%
Republican hold			

=== 2004 ===
North Carolina House of Representatives 91st district Republican primary election, 2004
Party	Candidate	Votes	%
Republican	Bryan Holloway	2,584	53.73%
Republican	Rex Baker (incumbent)	2,225	46.27%
Total votes		4,809	100%

North Carolina House of Representatives 91st district general election, 2004
Party	Candidate	Votes	%
Republican	Bryan Holloway	16,870	57.38%
Democratic	Robert W. Mitchell	12,533	42.62%
Total votes		29,403	100%
Republican hold			

North Carolina House of Representatives
Preceded by Rex Baker	Member of the North Carolina House of Representatives from the 91st district 2005–2015	Succeeded by Kyle Hall
