= George S. Robinson =

American politician from North Carolina

George Robinson
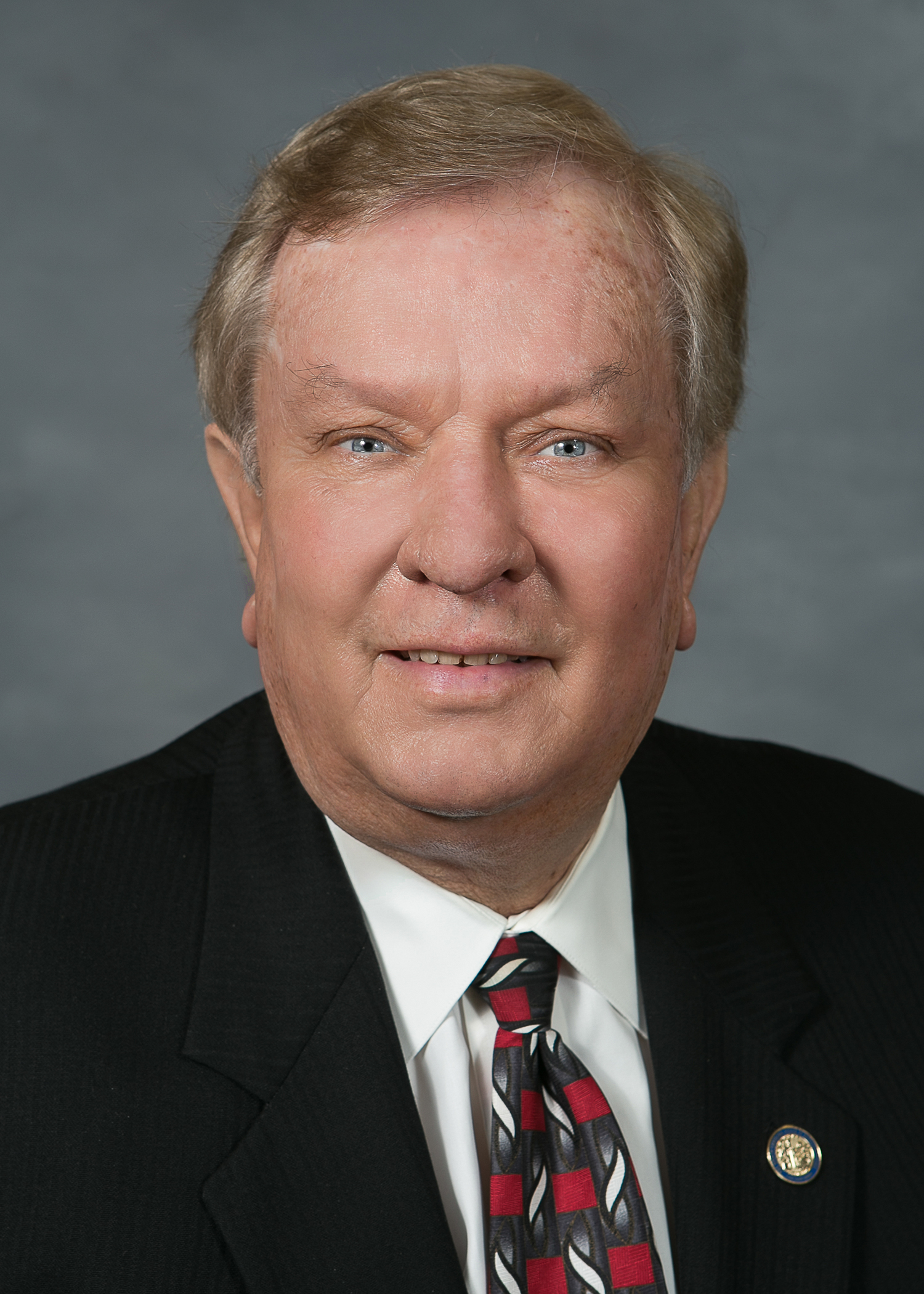
- Official portrait, 2015

Member of the North Carolina House of Representatives
- In office February 2, 2015 – January 1, 2017
- Preceded by: Edgar Starnes
- Succeeded by: Destin Hall
- Constituency: 87th District
- In office January 1, 1989 – January 1, 1997
- Preceded by: James Franklin Hughes; Edgar Starnes
- Succeeded by: Edgar Starnes
- Constituency: 46th District (1989-1993); 91st District (1993-1997)
- In office January 1, 1981 – January 1, 1987
- Preceded by: Eugene Morrison White
- Succeeded by: Edgar Starnes
- Constituency: 34th District (1981-1983); 46th District (1983-1987)

Personal details
- Born: November 15, 1945 (age 80)
- Party: Republican
- Education: University of Tennessee
- Occupation: Lumber company executive
- Project Vote Smart Biography

George S. Robinson (born November 15, 1945) is a North Carolina Republican politician who served in the North Carolina House of Representatives from 1980–86 and 1988-96 and was selected by Caldwell County party leaders in 2015 to return to the legislature to fill an unexpired term. Through the end of 2016, Robinson will fill the 87th District seat vacated by Edgar Starnes, who resigned to accept a position with the North Carolina State Treasurer's office. Robinson ran for a new full term but was defeated by Destin Hall in the March 15, 2016 Republican primary.

Robinson, a native of Lenoir, North Carolina, is a veteran of the United States Air Force and an alumnus of the University of Tennessee.

After Robinson served his first three terms, he gave up his seat to run for the United States House of Representatives, but was defeated by Cass Ballenger in a Republican primary election. Robinson then served as deputy assistant secretary of the North Carolina Department of Transportation under Governor James G. Martin. He returned to the legislature in the 1988 election and was re-elected in 1990, 1992 and 1994. Concerns about his family’s timber company’s financial situation made him decide not to run for re-election in 1996. In 1997, he became mayor of the village of Cedar Rock, North Carolina.

Robinson was also an unsuccessful candidate for the North Carolina Senate in 2004 (losing to Jim Jacumin in a Republican primary election) and in 2012 (losing to Dan Soucek in a Republican primary election).

== Recent electoral history ==
=== 2016 ===
North Carolina House of Representatives 87th district Republican primary election, 2016
Party	Candidate	Votes	%
Republican	Destin Hall	6,827	59.74%
Republican	George Robinson (incumbent)	4,600	40.26%
Total votes		11,427	100%

=== 2012 ===
North Carolina Senate 45th district Republican primary election, 2012
Party	Candidate	Votes	%
Republican	Dan Soucek (incumbent)	17,384	65.43%
Republican	George Robinson	9,186	34.57%
Total votes		26,570	100%

=== 2004 ===
North Carolina Senate 44th district Republican primary election, 2004
Party	Candidate	Votes	%
Republican	Jim Jacumin	5,511	62.20%
Republican	George Robinson	3,349	37.80%
Total votes		8,860	100%

North Carolina House of Representatives
Preceded by Eugene Morrison White	Member of the North Carolina House of Representatives from the 34th district 1981–1983; Served alongside: John Walter Brown, George Holmes	Succeeded by Dwight Wilson Quinn; Betty Marie Dorton Thomas; Robert L. Slaughter; Joseph Richardson Hudson
Preceded by Constituency established	Member of the North Carolina House of Representatives from the 46th district 1983–1987; Served alongside: James Frank Hughes, Swan Burnett Lacey Jr., Charles Franklin Buchanan	Succeeded by Edgar Starnes
Preceded by James Frank Hughes; Edgar Starnes	Member of the North Carolina House of Representatives from the 46th district 1989–1993; Served alongside: David Flaherty, Charles Franklin Buchanan	Succeeded by David Flaherty; Gregory James Thompson
Preceded by Constituency established	Member of the North Carolina House of Representatives from the 91st district 1993–1997	Succeeded by Edgar Starnes
Preceded by Edgar Starnes	Member of the North Carolina House of Representatives from the 87th district 2015–2017	Succeeded by Destin Hall
