= 2028 North Carolina gubernatorial election =

- November 7, 2028
Party	Democratic	Republican
Incumbent governor
Josh Stein
Democratic

The 2028 North Carolina gubernatorial election will be held on November 7, 2028, to elect the governor of North Carolina to a four-year term. Incumbent Democratic governor Josh Stein is eligible to run for re-election.

== Background ==
In 2024, Stein defeated Republican nominee Mark Robinson by 14.8 percentage points. Republican nominee Donald Trump won the state by 3.2 percentage points.

== Democratic primary ==
=== Candidates ===
==== Publicly expressed interest ====
- Josh Stein, incumbent governor

== Republican primary ==
=== Candidates ===
==== Declared ====
- Robert Burns, mayor of Monroe

==== Potential ====
- Brenden Jones, majority leader of the North Carolina House of Representatives (2025–present) from the 46th district
