= Rex L. Baker =

American politician from North Carolina

Rex Baker
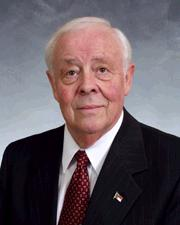

Member of the North Carolina House of Representatives
- In office January 1, 1995 – January 1, 2005
- Preceded by: Anderson D. Cromer; David Hunter Diamont; Wade Franklin Wilmoth
- Succeeded by: Bryan Holloway
- Constituency: 40th District (1995-2003); 91st District (2003-2005)

Personal details
- Born: June 9, 1938 (age 88) King, North Carolina, U.S.
- Party: Republican
- Education: Wake Forest University (BBA); University of North Carolina, Chapel Hill (MBA)

Rex Levi Baker was a Republican member of the North Carolina General Assembly representing the state's ninety-first House district, including constituents in Forsyth, Stokes and Surry counties. A retired business owner from King, North Carolina, Baker was defeated in the 2004 Republican primary by Bryan Holloway.

== Electoral history ==
=== 2004 ===
North Carolina House of Representatives 91st district Republican primary election, 2004
Party	Candidate	Votes	%
Republican	Bryan Holloway	2,584	53.73%
Republican	Rex Baker (incumbent)	2,225	46.27%
Total votes		4,809	100%

=== 2002 ===
North Carolina House of Representatives 91st district Republican primary election, 2002
Party	Candidate	Votes	%
Republican	Rex Baker (incumbent)	2,880	58.57%
Republican	Barry Lawson	2,037	41.43%
Total votes		4,917	100%

North Carolina House of Representatives 91st district general election, 2002
Party	Candidate	Votes	%
Republican	Rex Baker (incumbent)	10,548	56.81%
Democratic	Robert W. Mitchell	8,019	43.19%
Total votes		18,567	100%
Republican hold			

=== 2000 ===
North Carolina House of Representatives 40th district Republican primary election, 2000
Party	Candidate	Votes	%
Republican	William Hiatt (incumbent)	5,951	30.41%
Republican	Gene Wilson (incumbent)	5,317	27.17%
Republican	Rex Baker (incumbent)	4,798	24.52%
Republican	John Brady	1,928	9.85%
Republican	Larry Joseph Wood II	1,575	8.05%
Total votes		19,569	100%

North Carolina House of Representatives 40th district general election, 2000
Party	Candidate	Votes	%
Republican	William Hiatt (incumbent)	44,155	23.90%
Republican	Gene Wilson (incumbent)	42,337	22.92%
Republican	Rex Baker (incumbent)	42,110	22.79%
Democratic	Bert Wood	30,224	16.36%
Democratic	Daniel Hense	25,915	14.03%
Total votes		184,741	100%
Republican hold			
Republican hold			
Republican hold			

North Carolina House of Representatives
Preceded by Anderson D. Cromer; David Hunter Diamont; Wade Franklin Wilmoth	Member of the North Carolina House of Representatives from the 40th district 1995–2003; Served alongside: Gene Wilson, William Hiatt	Succeeded by Rick Eddins
Preceded by Edgar Starnes	Member of the North Carolina House of Representatives from the 91st district 2003–2005	Succeeded by Bryan Holloway
