= Destin Hall =

American politician

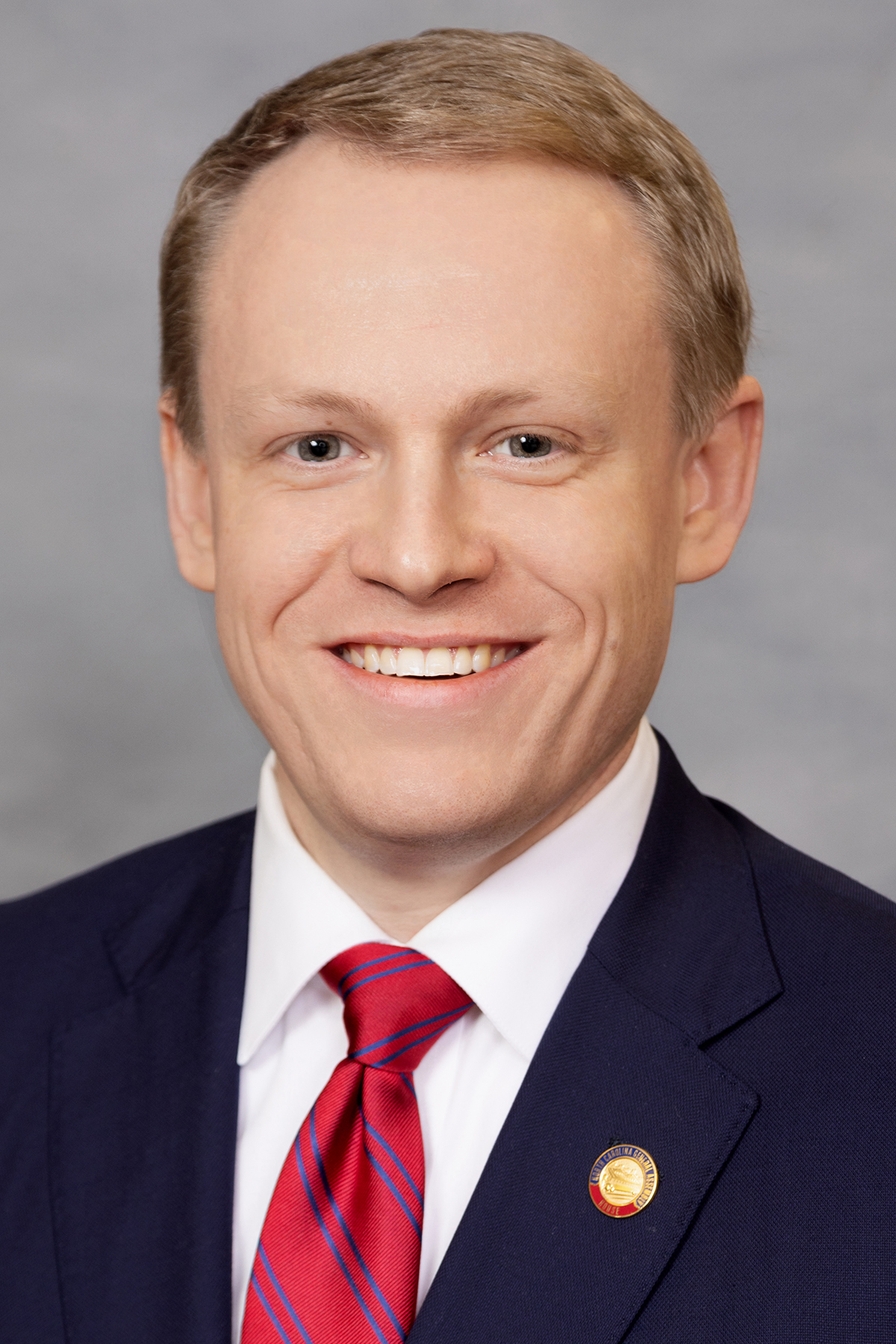
- Official portrait, 2025

Speaker of the North Carolina House of Representatives
- Incumbent
- Assumed office January 8, 2025
- Preceded by: Tim Moore

Member of the North Carolina House of Representatives from the 87th district
- Incumbent
- Assumed office January 1, 2017
- Preceded by: George Robinson

Personal details
- Born: Destin Chase Hall; July 17, 1987 (age 39) Lenoir, North Carolina, U.S.
- Party: Republican
- Education: Appalachian State University (BS); Wake Forest University (JD)

Destin Chase Hall is an American attorney and politician who has served in the North Carolina House of Representatives, representing the 87th district since 2017.

== Personal life ==
Hall was born on July 17, 1987, in Lenoir, North Carolina, to working class parents. His father was a construction worker and his mother was a beautician. He was mostly raised by his grandparents. He graduated from West Caldwell High School and went on to earn his bachelor's degree from Appalachian State University, where he double-majored in Finance and Risk Management & Insurance. After his graduation from Appalachian State University in 2009, he earned his J.D. degree from Wake Forest University School of Law. After he graduated law school in 2014, Hall practiced law in Charlotte, North Carolina, for a year before returning to his hometown of Lenoir. Hall currently lives and practices in Lenoir, North Carolina. He is married to Madison Skeens.

== Political career ==
Hall began his political career soon after his return to Caldwell County in 2015 where he became the Treasurer of the Caldwell County Republican Party. In January 2015, the longtime state House Representative Edgar Vance Starnes, who previously held the seat for 20 years, unexpectedly resigned to accept a position with the North Carolina State Treasurer's office. George S. Robinson was appointed to take Starnes's seat in the North Carolina House. Hall announced his campaign for the North Carolina House of Representatives 87th District seat on December 1, 2015. In March 2016, Hall won the Republican Party Primary. Hall won the General Election on November 9, 2016. He was sworn in as a member of the North Carolina House of Representatives in January 2017. Shortly after, Hall was elected by his peers to be the Majority Freshman Leader of the House Republican Caucus. In 2018 and 2020, Hall was reelected to his seat in the North Carolina House of Representatives.

On August 3rd, 2020, Hall was appointed co-chair of the North Carolina House Committee on Rules, Calendar, and Operations of the House by Speaker Tim Moore. Shortly after Hall's appointment, he was raised to full chairman of the committee following the unexpected resignation of the prior chairman, David R. Lewis.

After being sworn in for his third term, Hall was once again appointed to serve as chairman of the North Carolina House Committee on Rules, Calendar, and Operations of the House by Speaker Tim Moore for the 2021-2022 Legislative Session.

Hall won reelection to his fifth term in November 2024. In January 2025, Hall was elected as the 121st Speaker of the North Carolina House of Representatives by his colleagues.

The North Carolina General Assembly, led by Hall, passed redrawn district maps allowing for an 11-3 split in Congress favoring the Republicans. In the November 2026 midterm elections, the Republicans ended with a 3-11 disadvantage.

== North Carolina House of Representatives ==
=== Notable legislation ===
House Bill 551 – Strengthening Victims' Rights. This bill was based on Marsy's Law, making North Carolina one of several states that have adopted the constitutional amendment. House Bill 551 amended the state constitution to expand the legal rights of crime victims. This constitutional amendment was approved by a majority of North Carolinians in November 2018.

House Bill 370 – House Bill 370 "Require Cooperation with ICE Detainers" would obligate North Carolina's sheriffs to notify federal immigration agents if the Sheriff's department cannot determine an inmate's legal status in the United States of America, the sheriffs would be obligated to hold inmates already in their custody who are subject to a detainer by I.C.E for up to 48 hours. House Bill 370 passed both chambers of the North Carolina General Assembly but was vetoed by Governor Roy Cooper on August 21, 2019.

House Bill 218 – House Bill 218, “Broadcast NC House of Reps Sessions" pushed for video coverage at the General Assembly. It was supposed to establish a devoted webcast of daily House sessions and directed that sessions of “particular public importance” should be aired on UNCTV. In 2019, North Carolina was one of seven that did not provide video broadcasts or video webcasts of their legislative sessions to the public. The bill passed through the North Carolina House by a vote of 116–1, however the bill was never passed by the North Carolina Senate. Even though the bill had been stopped in the Senate Rules Committee, Speaker of The House Tim Moore directed that the North Carolina House of Representatives would broadcast its legislative sessions by video via web streaming services. The video broadcasts began in April 2020.

This video system was implemented at the time when it was most useful. The COVID-19 outbreak increased public interest in legislative issues, and the new video system allowed for North Carolinians to tune in to the legislative sessions of the North Carolina House of Representatives.

== Electoral history ==
=== 2024 ===
North Carolina House of Representatives 87th district general election, 2024
Party	Candidate	Votes	%
Republican	Destin Hall (incumbent)	34,187	75.42%
Democratic	Barbara Kirby	11,142	24.58%
Total votes		45,329	100%
Republican hold			

=== 2022 ===
North Carolina House of Representatives 87th district general election, 2022
Party	Candidate	Votes	%
Republican	Destin Hall (incumbent)	22,864	76.21%
Democratic	Barbara Kirby	7,139	23.79%
Total votes		30,003	100%
Republican hold			

=== 2020 ===
North Carolina House of Representatives 87th district general election, 2020
Party	Candidate	Votes	%
Republican	Destin Hall (incumbent)	31,830	76.93%
Democratic	Corie Schreiber	9,544	23.07%
Total votes		41,374	100%
Republican hold			

=== 2018 ===
North Carolina House of Representatives 87th district general election, 2018
Party	Candidate	Votes	%
Republican	Destin Hall (incumbent)	19,031	72.86%
Democratic	Amanda Bregel	7,089	27.14%
Total votes		26,120	100%
Republican hold			

=== 2016 ===
North Carolina House of Representatives 87th district Republican primary election, 2016
Party	Candidate	Votes	%
Republican	Destin Hall	6,827	59.74%
Republican	George Robinson (incumbent)	4,600	40.26%
Total votes		11,427	100%

North Carolina House of Representatives 87th district general election, 2016
Party	Candidate	Votes	%
Republican	Destin Hall	29,066	94.14%
Unaffaliated	Terri M. Johnson (write-in)	1,279	4.14%
Write-in		531	1.72%
Total votes		30,876	100%
Republican hold			

Political offices
Preceded by Tim Moore	Speaker of the North Carolina House of Representatives; 2025–present	Incumbent
