= Carson Smith (politician) =

American politician

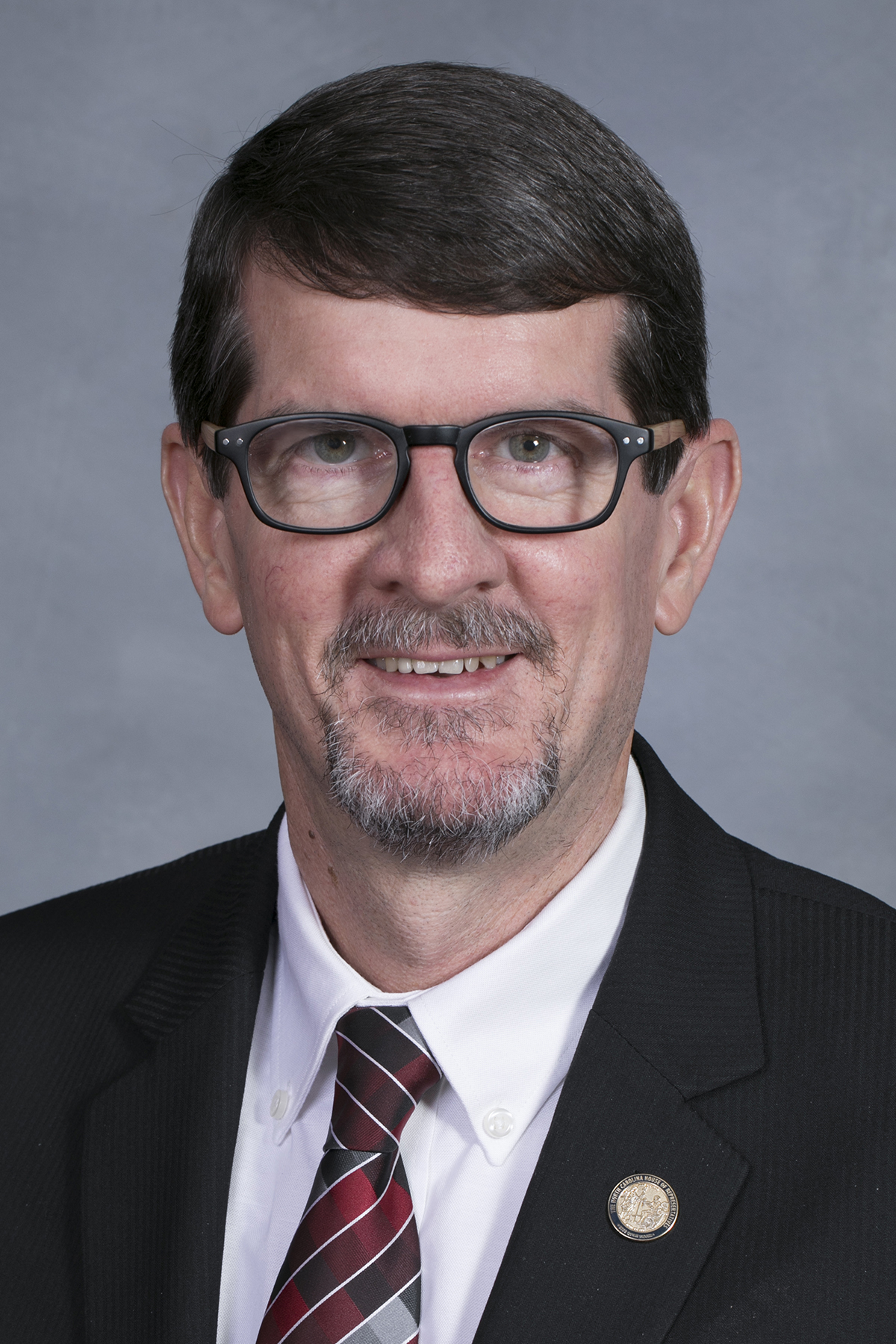

Member of the North Carolina House of Representatives from the 16th district
- Incumbent
- Assumed office January 1, 2019
- Preceded by: Bob Muller

Sheriff of Pender County
- In office 2002–2018
- Preceded by: Michael Harvell
- Succeeded by: Alan Cutler

Personal details
- Born: Carson Henry Smith Jr. 1966 or 1967 (age 58–59) Wilmington, North Carolina, U.S.
- Party: Republican
- Education: Cape Fear Community College
- Profession: Sheriff
- Website: Official website

Carson Henry Smith Jr. (born c. 1967) is an American politician who is a Republican member of the North Carolina House of Representatives, having been initially elected in 2018. He has represented the 16th district (which includes all of Pender County and parts of Columbus County) since 2019. Smith previously served as sheriff of Pender County, from 2002 until 2018.

In March 2020, during the COVID-19 pandemic, Smith was appointed as interim Emergency Management Director of Pender County after the sudden resignation of Chuck Tear (who had held the post for three months at the time of his resignation). Smith had previously served as Emergency Management Director for the county prior to his first term as sheriff in 2002.

== Electoral history ==
=== 2020 ===
North Carolina House of Representatives 16th district general election, 2020
Party	Candidate	Votes	%
Republican	Carson Smith (incumbent)	30,161	64.40%
Democratic	Debbi Fintak	16,674	35.60%
Total votes		46,835	100%
Republican hold			

=== 2018 ===
North Carolina House of Representatives 16th district general election, 2018
Party	Candidate	Votes	%
Republican	Carson Smith	18,146	59.32%
Democratic	John Johnson	12,443	40.68%
Total votes		30,589	100%
Republican hold			

=== 2014 ===
Pender County Sheriff general election, 2014
Party	Candidate	Votes	%
Republican	Carson Smith (incumbent)	11,590	71.37%
Democratic	Scott Lawson	4,649	28.63%
Total votes		16,239	100%
Republican hold			

=== 2010 ===
Pender County Sheriff general election, 2010
Party	Candidate	Votes	%
Republican	Carson Smith (incumbent)	10,938	66.81%
Democratic	Doyle Christopher	5,434	33.19%
Total votes		16,372	100%
Republican hold			

== Committee assignments ==
=== 2021-2022 Session ===
- Appropriations (Vice Chair)
- Appropriations - Justice and Public Safety (Chair)
- Pensions and Retirement (Vice Chair)
- Judiciary II
- Marine Resources and Aqua Culture
- Wildlife Resources

=== 2019-2020 Session ===
- Appropriations
- Appropriations - Capital
- Health
- Pensions and Retirement
- Judiciary

North Carolina House of Representatives
Preceded by Bob Muller	Member of the North Carolina House of Representatives from the 16th district 2019-Present	Incumbent
