= Douglas Y. Yongue =

American politician

Dr. Douglas Yongue
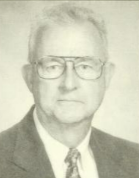
- Yongue in the 1999 legislative manual

Member of the North Carolina House of Representatives
- In office January 1, 1993 – January 1, 2011
- Preceded by: Daniel Howard DeVane; John Calvin Hasty; Adolph Dial
- Succeeded by: Gaston (G. L.) Pridgen
- Constituency: 16th District (1993-2003); 46th District (2003-2011)

Personal details
- Born: Douglas Yates Yongue Sr. March 20, 1937 Lumberton, North Carolina, U.S.
- Died: March 21, 2019 (aged 82) Laurinburg, North Carolina, U.S.
- Party: Democratic

Douglas Yates Yongue Sr. (March 20, 1937 – March 21, 2019) was an American Democratic member of the North Carolina General Assembly representing the state's forty-sixth House district, including constituents in Hoke, Robeson and Scotland counties. A retired educator from Laurinburg, North Carolina, Yongue served for 8 terms before being defeated by Gaston (G. L.) Pridgen when running for his 9th term.

Yongue previously served on the following General Assembly committees: Appropriations (Chairman); Education (Member); Education Subcommittee on Education (Member); Ethics (Vice-Chairman); Federal Relations and Indian Affairs (Member); Rules, Calendar and Operations of the House (Member); State Personnel (Member). Yongue died on March 21, 2019, in Laurinburg, at the age of 82.

== Recent electoral history ==
=== 2010 ===
North Carolina House of Representatives 46th district general election, 2010
Party	Candidate	Votes	%
Republican	Gaston (G. L.) Pridgen	7,590	52.17%
Democratic	Douglas Yongue (incumbent)	6,958	47.83%
Total votes		14,548	100%
Republican gain from Democratic			

=== 2008 ===
North Carolina House of Representatives 46th district general election, 2008
Party	Candidate	Votes	%
Democratic	Douglas Yongue (incumbent)	18,275	100%
Total votes		18,275	100%
Democratic hold			

=== 2006 ===
North Carolina House of Representatives 46th district general election, 2006
Party	Candidate	Votes	%
Democratic	Douglas Yongue (incumbent)	7,684	100%
Total votes		7,684	100%
Democratic hold			

=== 2004 ===
North Carolina House of Representatives 46th district general election, 2004
Party	Candidate	Votes	%
Democratic	Douglas Yongue (incumbent)	12,913	100%
Total votes		12,913	100%
Democratic hold			

=== 2002 ===
North Carolina House of Representatives 46th district general election, 2002
Party	Candidate	Votes	%
Democratic	Douglas Yongue (incumbent)	6,920	63.50%
Republican	C. Linwood Faulk	3,978	36.50%
Total votes		10,898	100%
Democratic hold			

=== 2000 ===
North Carolina House of Representatives 16th district general election, 2000
Party	Candidate	Votes	%
Democratic	Douglas Yongue (incumbent)	11,871	64.24%
Republican	C. Linwood Faulk	6,608	35.76%
Total votes		18,479	100%
Democratic hold			

North Carolina House of Representatives
Preceded by Daniel Howard DeVane; John Calvin Hasty; Adolph Dial	Member of the North Carolina House of Representatives from the 16th district 1993-2003	Succeeded by Carolyn Justice
Preceded by Charles Buchanan; Gregg Thompson	Member of the North Carolina House of Representatives from the 46th district 2003-2011	Succeeded by Gaston (G. L.) Pridgen
