= King Historic District =

Historic district in North Carolina, United States

- U.S. National Register of Historic Places
- U.S. Historic district
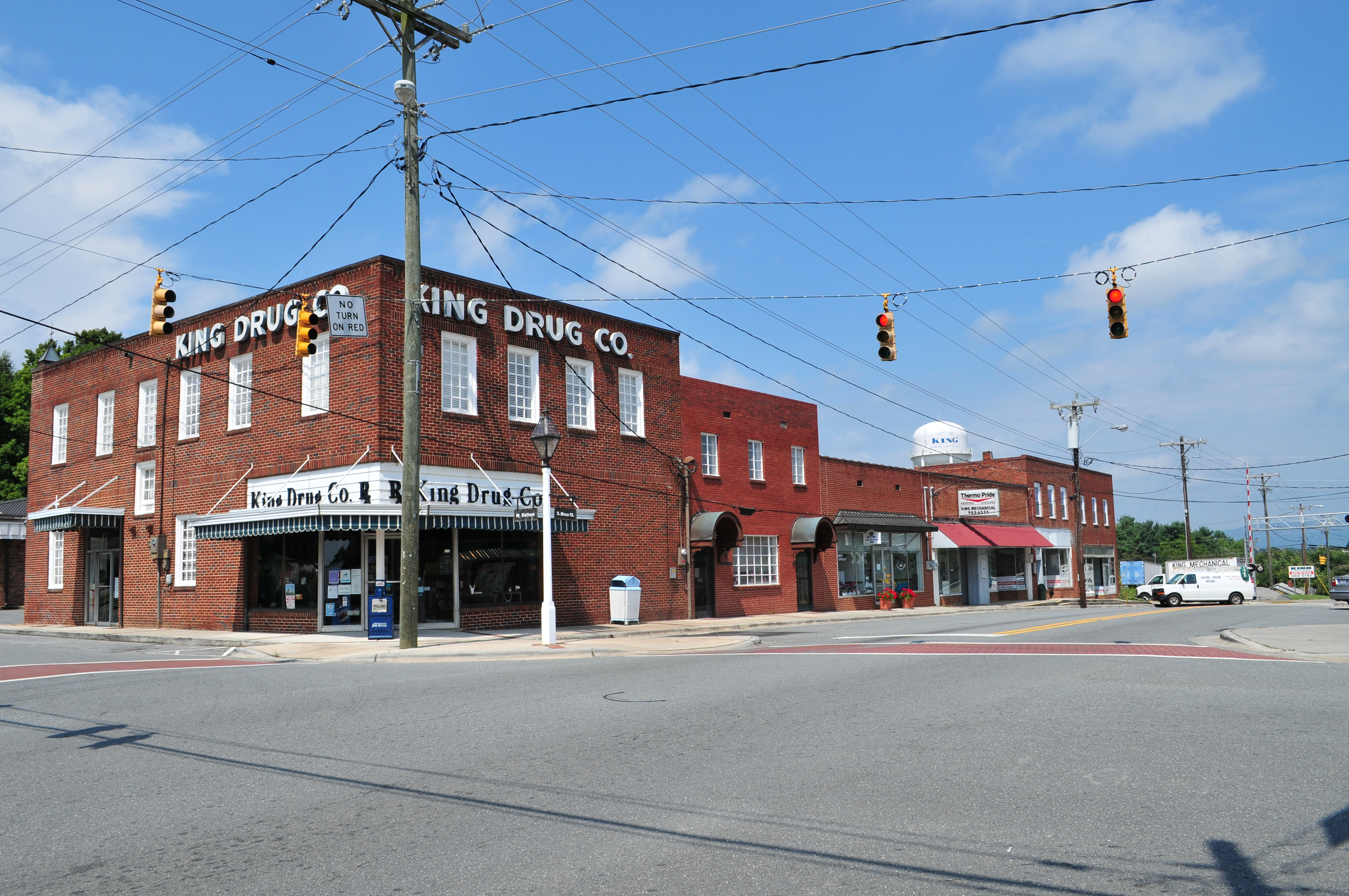
- King Drug Company, King Historic District, September 2013

- Location within North Carolina Location within the United States
- Location: Dalton Rd., Main St., School St. and Railroad Right of Way, King, North Carolina
- Coordinates: 36°24′30″N 80°12′24″W
- Area: 25 acres (10 ha)
- Built: 1939
- Architectural style: Colonial Revival, Bungalow/craftsman
- NRHP reference No.: 02000941
- Added to NRHP: September 6, 2002

King Historic District is a national historic district located at King, Stokes County, North Carolina. The district encompasses 72 contributing buildings and 1 contributing structure in the central business district and surrounding residential sections of King. They were built between about 1914 to the 1950s and include notable examples of Colonial Revival and Bungalow / American Craftsman architecture. Notable buildings include the Bank of King, King Drug Company, Simeon Wesley Pulliam House (c. 1907), James Robert Hutchins House (c. 1905), King Milling Company (c. 1920), and King Moravian Church (c. 1925).

It was added to the National Register of Historic Places in 2002.
