= Bob Muller =

American politician

Member of the North Carolina House of Representatives from the 16th district
- In office September 26, 2017 – January 1, 2019
- Preceded by: Chris Millis
- Succeeded by: Carson Smith

Personal details
- Born: 1931 or 1932 (age 94–95)
- Party: Republican
- Occupation: lawyer

Bob Muller (born c. 1932) is a former Republican member of the North Carolina General Assembly. He represented the 16th district. He was appointed to succeed Chris Millis, who resigned.

North Carolina House of Representatives
Preceded by Chris Millis	Member of the North Carolina House of Representatives from the 16th district 2017-2019	Succeeded by Carson Smith
