= Sawmills, North Carolina =

- Town
- Sawmills town hall
- Motto: "Biggest Little Town in the Foothills"
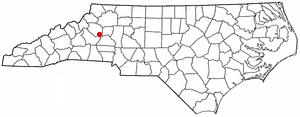
- Location of Sawmills, North Carolina
- Coordinates: 35°48′59″N 81°28′41″W
- Country: United States
- State: North Carolina
- County: Caldwell

Area
  - Total: 6.61 sq mi (17.13 km^{2})
  - Land: 6.61 sq mi (17.11 km^{2})
  - Water: 0.0077 sq mi (0.02 km^{2})
- Elevation: 1,178 ft (359 m)

Population (2020)
  - Total: 5,020
  - Density: 759.7/sq mi (293.33/km^{2})
- Time zone: UTC-5 (Eastern (EST))
  - Summer (DST): UTC-4 (EDT)
- FIPS code: 37-59540
- GNIS feature ID: 2407295
- Website: townofsawmills.com

Sawmills is a town in Caldwell County, North Carolina, United States. As of the 2020 census, Sawmills had a population of 5,020. It is part of the Hickory–Lenoir–Morganton Metropolitan Statistical Area. The town is named after the sawmills that were set up in the community, due to the timber industry that formerly predominated in the area during its early history.

== History ==
The community of Sawmills began in the late 1800s. The name "Sawmills" originates from the sawmills that were set up in the area due to the timber industry. The railroad system that ran through Caldwell County is one of the main reasons for the sawmills to locate in what would become the community of Sawmills.

Sawmills was incorporated as a town in 1988. The nearby towns of Granite Falls and Hudson vying for potential business property in the area, is what led the Sawmills community to vote for incorporation.

== Geography ==
Sawmills is located in southern Caldwell County, bordered by Hudson to the north and Granite Falls to the east. Lake Rhodhiss borders the town to the south.

According to the U.S. Census Bureau, Sawmills has a total area of 6.6 square miles (17.2 km^{2}), of which 0.008 square miles (0.02 km^{2}), or 0.09%, is water.

Sawmills Veterans Park is located on Lake Rhodhiss, providing trails and recreational facilities such as baseball fields, a soccer field, playground, boat launch area, and an 18-hole disc golf course.

== Demographics ==
Historical population
Census	Pop.	Note	%±
1990	4,088		—
2000	4,921		20.4%
2010	5,240		6.5%
2020	5,020		−4.2%
2025 (est.)	5,105	▲	1.7%
U.S. Decennial Census

=== 2020 census ===
As of the 2020 census, Sawmills had a population of 5,020. The median age was 43.5 years. 20.4% of residents were under the age of 18 and 19.2% of residents were 65 years of age or older. For every 100 females there were 102.3 males, and for every 100 females age 18 and over there were 97.3 males age 18 and over.

86.8% of residents lived in urban areas, while 13.2% lived in rural areas.

There were 2,072 households in Sawmills, including 1,417 families. Of those households, 29.5% had children under the age of 18 living in them. Of all households, 48.7% were married-couple households, 17.6% were households with a male householder and no spouse or partner present, and 24.9% were households with a female householder and no spouse or partner present. About 24.7% of all households were made up of individuals and 11.2% had someone living alone who was 65 years of age or older.

There were 2,226 housing units, of which 6.9% were vacant. The homeowner vacancy rate was 1.4% and the rental vacancy rate was 5.6%.

Sawmills racial composition
Race	Number	Percentage
White (non-Hispanic)	4,344	86.53%
Black or African American (non-Hispanic)	97	1.93%
Native American	15	0.3%
Asian	28	0.56%
Other/Mixed	211	4.2%
Hispanic or Latino	325	6.47%

=== 2000 census ===
As of the census of 2000, there were 4,921 people, 1,942 households, and 1,448 families residing in the town. The population density was 787.4 inhabitants per square mile (304.0/km^{2}). There were 2,045 housing units at an average density of 327.2 per square mile (126.3/km^{2}). The racial makeup of the town was 97.34% White, 0.55% African American, 0.20% Native American, 0.16% Asian, 0.02% Pacific Islander, 1.16% from other races, and 0.57% from two or more races. Hispanic or Latino of any race were 2.36% of the population.

There were 1,942 households, out of which 35.7% had children under the age of 18 living with them, 56.8% were married couples living together, 11.5% had a female householder with no husband present, and 25.4% were non-families. 21.0% of all households were made up of individuals, and 5.7% had someone living alone who was 65 years of age or older. The average household size was 2.53 and the average family size was 2.89.

In the town, the population was spread out, with 25.7% under the age of 18, 8.8% from 18 to 24, 32.3% from 25 to 44, 24.0% from 45 to 64, and 9.2% who were 65 years of age or older. The median age was 34 years. For every 100 females, there were 99.0 males. For every 100 females age 18 and over, there were 97.0 males.

The median income for a household in the town was $36,391, and the median income for a family was $41,579. Males had a median income of $27,933 versus $20,688 for females. The per capita income for the town was $15,597. About 4.3% of families and 8.9% of the population were below the poverty line, including 8.2% of those under age 18 and 11.2% of those age 65 or over.
