= Kyle Hall =

American politician

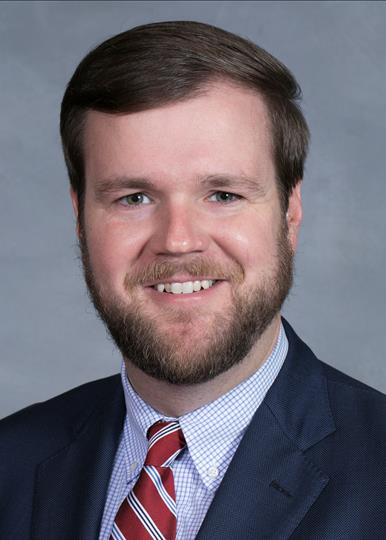

Member of the North Carolina House of Representatives from the 91st district
- Incumbent
- Assumed office November 9, 2015
- Preceded by: Bryan Holloway

Personal details
- Born: September 5, 1990 (age 35) Winston-Salem, North Carolina, U.S.
- Party: Republican
- Education: University of North Carolina at Chapel Hill (BA)
- Occupation: Realtor
- Website: Campaign website

Kyle Hall (born September 5, 1990) is an American businessman and politician currently serving in the North Carolina House of Representatives.

== Early life ==
Hall was born September 5, 1990, and raised in Stokes County, North Carolina. He was educated in North Carolina's state public school systems, beginning at Pinnacle Elementary, working his way through community college, and earning a Bachelor of Arts in political science from UNC-Chapel Hill, where he graduated in 2012.

== Political career ==
Prior to serving in the legislature, Hall was the Communications Director for U.S. Congressman Mark Walker (NC Sixth District).

On November 23, 2015, Hall was appointed to the North Carolina House seat of NC House District 91 by Governor Pat McCrory. He was elected to his first full term in November 2016.

Hall was reelected to his seat in the North Carolina House of Representatives in November 2018.

== North Carolina House of Representatives ==
=== Committee assignments ===
Standing or select committees (2017–2018 Session)

- Appropriations, Vice chair
- Appropriations on Agriculture and Natural and Economic Resources, Chair
- Appropriations on Information Technology
- Commerce and Job Development
- Education – K–12
- Homelessness, Foster Care, and Dependency
- Insurance

Standing or select committees (2019–2020 Session)

- Agriculture
- Appropriations, Vice chair
- Appropriations, Agriculture and Natural and Economic Resources, Chair
- Appropriations, Information Technology, Chair
- Commerce
- Environment
- Insurance

=== Electoral history ===
==== 2022 ====
North Carolina House of Representatives 91st district Republican primary election, 2022
Party	Candidate	Votes	%
Republican	Kyle Hall (incumbent)	7,761	82.99%
Republican	James Douglas	977	10.45%
Republican	Stephen L. James	614	6.57%
Total votes		9,352	100%

==== 2020 ====
North Carolina House of Representatives 91st district general election, 2020
Party	Candidate	Votes	%
Republican	Kyle Hall (incumbent)	33,534	78.38%
Democratic	Rita Cruise	9,252	21.62%
Total votes		42,786	100%
Republican hold			

==== 2018 ====
North Carolina House of Representatives 91st district general election, 2018
Party	Candidate	Votes	%
Republican	Kyle Hall (incumbent)	21,232	73.24%
Democratic	Michael Booth	7,134	24.61%
Libertarian	Steve Brenneis	623	2.15%
Total votes		28,989	100%
Republican hold			

==== 2016 ====
North Carolina House of Representatives 91st district Republican primary election, 2016
Party	Candidate	Votes	%
Republican	Kyle Hall	4,898	43.84%
Republican	Robert Knight	3,427	30.67%
Republican	Ira "Bubba" Tilley	2,848	25.49%
Total votes		11,173	100%

North Carolina House of Representatives 91st district general election, 2016
Party	Candidate	Votes	%
Republican	Kyle Hall (incumbent)	24,639	66.47%
Democratic	Eugene Russell	12,430	33.53%
Total votes		37,069	100%
Republican hold			

=== Legislation ===
House Bill 464, "Small Business Health Care Act", established standards for Association Health Plans (AHPs). It defined several terms and create requirements for the business associations sponsoring the AHPs, including domicile, solvency, and operational requirements. It also created requirements for the AHPs themselves, including coverage, premium, and non-discrimination requirements.

North Carolina House of Representatives
Preceded by Bryan Holloway	Member of the North Carolina House of Representatives from the 91st district 2015-Present	Incumbent
