= Ken Waddell =

American politician

Representative Ken Waddell
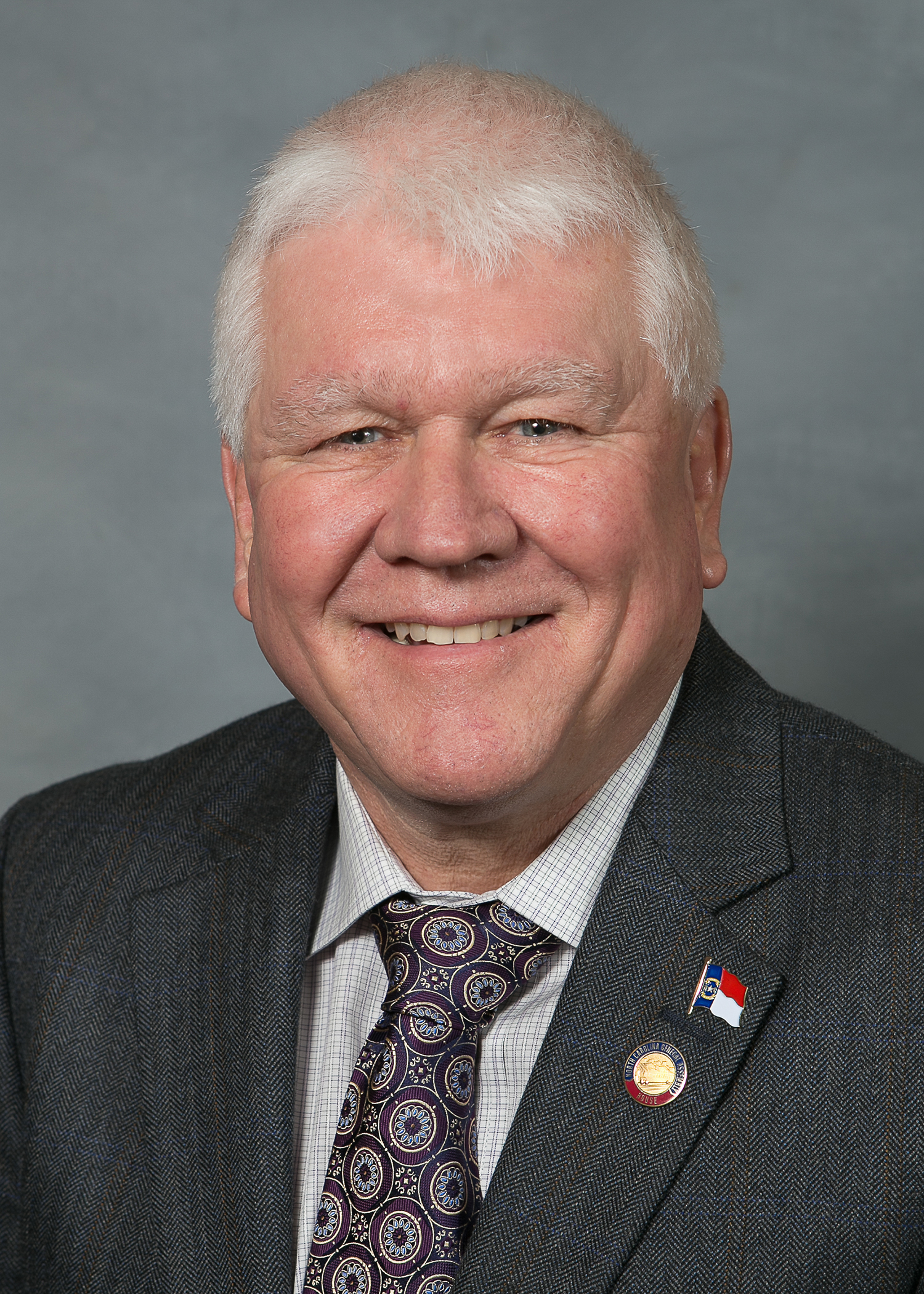

Member of the North Carolina House of Representatives from the 46th district
- In office January 1, 2013 – January 1, 2017
- Preceded by: Gaston (G. L.) Pridgen
- Succeeded by: Brenden Jones

Mayor of Chadbourn, North Carolina
- In office 2005–2012
- Preceded by: Leo Mercer
- Succeeded by: Fax Rector

Personal details
- Born: Kenneth Neil Waddell; September 11, 1953 (age 73)
- Party: Democratic
- Education: North Carolina State University (BS, MS)
- Occupation: farmer, retired educator

Kenneth Neil Waddell (born September 11, 1953) is a former Democratic member of the North Carolina House of Representatives. Waddell represented the 46th district (including constituents in Columbus, Robeson, and Bladen counties) from 2013 until 2017.

== Early life and career ==
A farmer and retired educator, he previously served as the mayor of Chadbourn, North Carolina from 2005 to 2012.

== Committee assignments ==
=== 2015-2016 session ===
- Transportation (Vice Chair)
- Wildlife Resources (Vice Chair)
- Agriculture
- Education - Community Colleges
- Finance
- Health
- Pensions and Retirement
- State Personnel

=== 2013-2014 session ===
- Agriculture
- Finance
- State Personnel
- Commerce and Job Development
- Homeland Security, Military, and Veterans Affairs

== Electoral history ==
=== 2014 ===
North Carolina House of Representatives 46th district general election, 2014
Party	Candidate	Votes	%
Democratic	Ken Waddell (incumbent)	11,551	53.42%
Republican	Brenden Jones	10,073	46.58%
Total votes		21,624	100%
Democratic hold			

=== 2012 ===
North Carolina House of Representatives 46th district Democratic primary election, 2012
Party	Candidate	Votes	%
Democratic	Ken Waddell	7,083	54.71%
Democratic	Al Leonard, Jr.	5,863	45.29%
Total votes		12,946	100%

North Carolina House of Representatives 46th district general election, 2012
Party	Candidate	Votes	%
Democratic	Ken Waddell	18,160	54.06%
Republican	Gaston (G.L.) Pridgen (incumbent)	15,431	45.94%
Total votes		33,591	100%
Democratic gain from Republican			

=== 2011 ===
Chadbourn Mayoral election, 2011
Candidate	Votes	%
Ken Waddell	219	91.25%
Write-in	21	8.75%
Total votes	240	100%

North Carolina House of Representatives
Preceded by Gaston (G. L.) Pridgen	Member of the North Carolina House of Representatives from the 46th district 2013-2017	Succeeded by Brenden Jones
