= Billy J. Boles =

Former U.S. Air Force general (1938–2021)

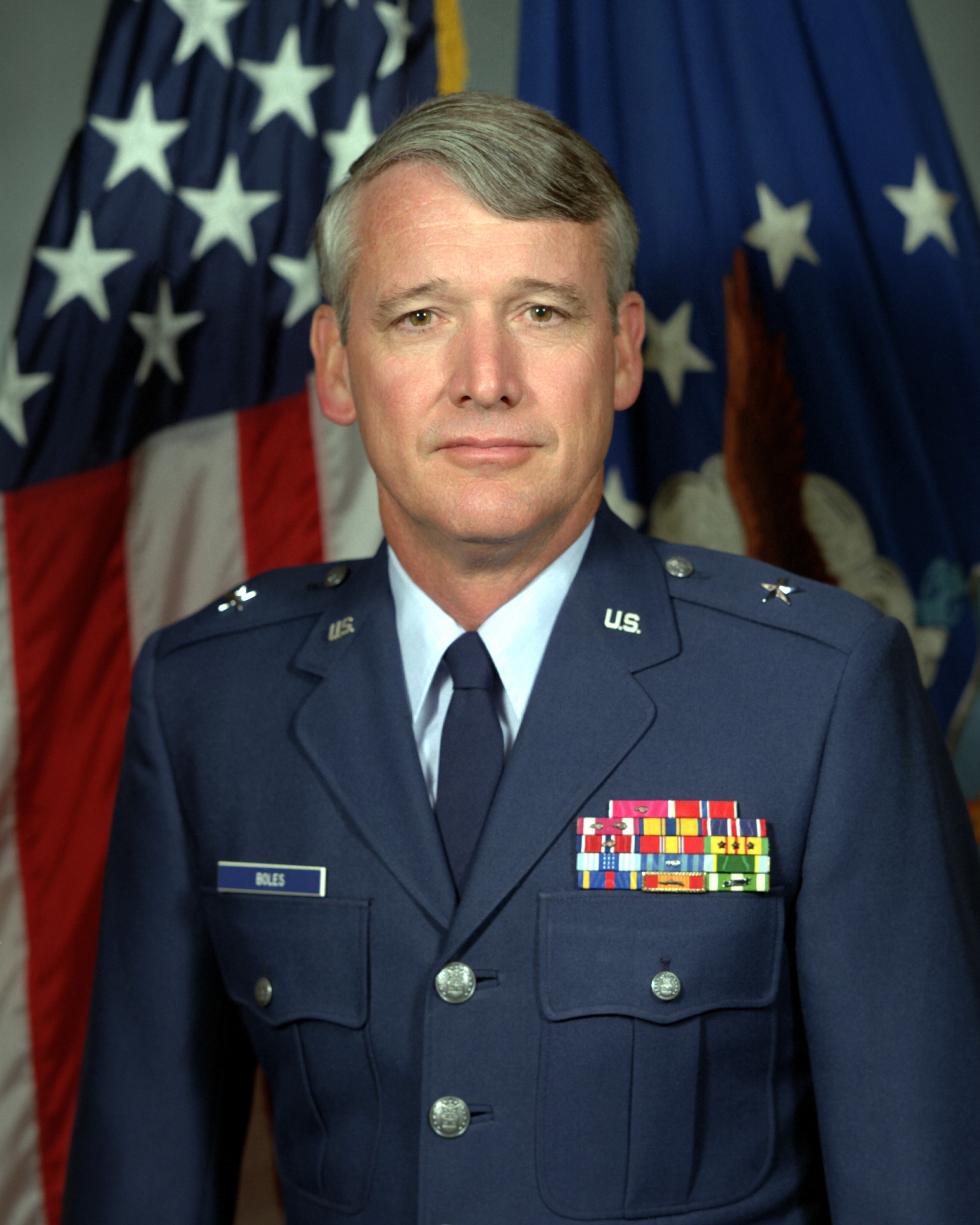
- Boles as a brigadier general, 1987
- Born: July 27, 1938; King, North Carolina, U.S.
- Died: December 9, 2021 (aged 83); Fort Sam Houston, Texas, U.S.
- Education: North Carolina State University (BS)
- Military career
- Allegiance: United States of America
- Branch: United States Air Force
- Service years: 1962–1997
- Rank: General
- Commands: Air Education and Training Command
- Awards: Air Force Distinguished Service Medal; Legion of Merit; Bronze Star Medal

Billy Joe Boles (July 27, 1938 – December 9, 2021) was a United States Air Force four-star general. At the time of his retirement, he was Commander of the Air Education and Training Command, a 70,000-person organization, responsible for recruiting, training and educating Air Force personnel.

Boles served for more than three years as the Senior Personnel Officer for the US Air Force, at that time a 700,000-person organization, worldwide. In his early career, Boles served in key leadership positions throughout the Air Force, including four tours of duty at Air Force headquarters in Washington D.C.. During his command and staff assignments he had extensive experience in media relations and in presenting Air Force programs to congressional committees.

== Education ==
- 1961 Bachelor of Science degree in agricultural education, North Carolina State University, Raleigh, North Carolina
- 1966 Squadron Officer School, Maxwell Air Force Base, Alabama
- 1973 Armed Forces Staff College, Norfolk, Virginia
- 1981 National War College, Fort Lesley J. McNair, Washington, D.C.

== Assignments ==
- March 1962 – September 1962, assistant officer in charge and officer in charge, Student Record Section, Keesler Air Force Base, Mississippi
- September 1962 – June 1964, instructor and assistant course supervisor, Personnel Officer Course, Greenville Air Force Base, Mississippi
- June 1964 – June 1965, supervisor and instructor, Personnel Officer Course, Amarillo Air Force Base, Texas
- July 1965 – October 1965, personnel officer, 6250th Combat Support Group, Tan Son Nhut Air Base, South Vietnam
- October 1965 – October 1966, instructor, Personnel Officer Course, Amarillo Air Force Base, Texas
- October 1966 – June 1967, chief, assignments division, Headquarters 7th Air Force, Tan Son Nhut Air Base, South Vietnam
- June 1967 – June 1969, assignment policy and procedure officer, Air Force Military Personnel Center, Randolph Air Force Base, Texas
- June 1969 – June 1970, personnel management system planning officer, Air Force Military Personnel Center, Randolph Air Force Base, Texas
- June 1970 – August 1972, assistant executive officer to the commander, Air Force Military Personnel Center, Randolph Air Force Base, Texas
- August 1972 – January 1973, student, Armed Forces Staff College, Norfolk, Virginia
- January 1973 – April 1977, chief, special activities division, then chief, regular and reserve division, Office of the Assistant for General Officer Matters, Headquarters U.S. Air Force, Washington, D.C.
- May 1977 – August 1980, executive to the commander, Headquarters Tactical Air Command, Langley Air Force Base, Virginia
- August 1980 – August 1981, student, National War College, Fort Lesley J. McNair, Washington, D.C.
- August 1981 – April 1983, chief, plans division, directorate of personnel plans, Headquarters U.S. Air Force, Washington, D.C.
- April 1983 – June 1985, assistant deputy chief of staff, then deputy chief of staff for personnel, Headquarters Tactical Air Command, Langley Air Force Base, Virginia
- June 1985 – June 1987, vice commander and assistant deputy chief of staff, personnel for military personnel, Air Force Military Personnel Center, Randolph Air Force Base, Texas
- June 1987 – July 1988, director, personnel programs, Headquarters U.S. Air Force, Washington, D.C.
- July 1988 – October 1991, assistant deputy chief of staff, personnel for military personnel and commander, Air Force Military Personnel Center, Randolph Air Force Base, Texas
- October 1991 – April 1995, deputy chief of staff for personnel, Headquarters U.S. Air Force, Washington, D.C.
- April 1995 – June 1995, vice commander, Headquarters Air Education and Training Command, Randolph Air Force Base, Texas
- June 1995 – April 1997, commander, Headquarters Air Education and Training Command, Randolph Air Force Base, Texas

== Major awards and decorations ==

1st Row	Air Force Distinguished Service Medal		Legion of Merit with oak leaf cluster	Bronze Star Medal
2nd Row	Meritorious Service Medal with two oak leaf clusters	Air Force Commendation Medal	Air Force Outstanding Unit Award	Air Force Organizational Excellence Award with four oak leaf clusters
3rd Row	National Defense Service Medal with service star	Vietnam Service Medal with four service stars	Air Force Overseas Ribbon - Short	Air Force Longevity Service Award Ribbon with 7 oak leaf clusters
4th Row	Small Arms Expert Marksmanship Ribbon	Air Force Training Ribbon	Republic of Vietnam Gallantry Cross Unit Citation	Republic of Vietnam Campaign Medal
