= G. L. Pridgen =

American politician

Gaston "G. L." Pridgen
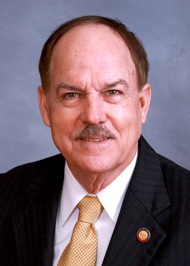
- Pridgen in 2011

Member of the North Carolina House of Representatives from the 46th district
- In office January 1, 2011 – January 1, 2013
- Preceded by: Douglas Yongue
- Succeeded by: Ken Waddell

Personal details
- Born: Gaston Layton Pridgen c.1944 (age 81–82) Robeson County, North Carolina
- Party: Republican
- Spouse: Wendy
- Children: 4
- Occupation: Business Owner
- Profession: Telecommunications

Military service
- Allegiance: United States
- Branch/service: United States Army

Gaston Layton Pridgen, known as G. L. Pridgen (born c. 1944), is a former Republican member of the North Carolina House of Representatives. In the House of Representatives, he represented the 46th District, including constituents in Hoke, Robeson, and Scotland counties from 2011 to 2013. A retired telecommunications technician from Lumberton, North Carolina Pridgen also has experience in the United States Military.

== Education and career ==
Pridgen was born in Robeson County, where he graduated from Littlefield High School and studied at Robeson Community College. His career with Southern Bell Telephone Company, which later became BellSouth Telecommunications and then AT&T, was interrupted by two years of service in the United States Army. Drafted into the army, he served as a communication lineman in Vietnam with the rank of Specialist-5, and was awarded the Bronze Star Medal.

In 1994, he started his own telecommunications company, The Communications Company, Inc., providing telecommunications to local businesses. In 2009 he began working in the IT Department at Southeastern Regional Medical Center.

== North Carolina House of Representatives ==
Pridgen is currently serving his first term as Representative for District 46 of North Carolina. In the House of Representatives he is active on seven standing and two House Select committees. Representative Pridgen was appointed to serve as Co-Chair of the House Unemployment Fraud Task Force and the House Select Committee on E-Procurement. The standing committees he serves are Agriculture, the Appropriations and Appropriations on Education, (of which he is Vice-Chair), Education, Judiciary and Judiciary B(criminal) subcommittee, and Public Utilities.

=== Views ===
Pridgen has been the primary sponsor of eleven bills and has co-sponsored twenty-eight other bills, including H475 which authorizes a referendum on whether to make English the official language of North Carolina. He was also a primary sponsor of bill H219 which aimed to keep stricter records of registered sex offenders in the state. Pridgen nominated Dick Taylor to serve on the University of North Carolina Board of Governors. Taylor was among eight of sixteen nominees approved by the NC House and is now serving on the Board. Pridgen also served as Vice-Chairman of the Appropriations Sub-committee on Education. In this role, he supported a motion that would allow extra tax revenue to help fund the University of North Carolina system schools.

=== Electoral history ===
==== 2012 ====
North Carolina House of Representatives 46th district general election, 2012
| Party | Candidate | Votes | % |
|---|---|---|---|
| Democratic | Ken Waddell | 18,160 | 54.06% |
| Republican | G. L. Pridgen (incumbent) | 15,431 | 45.94% |
| Total votes | | 33,591 | 100% |
| Democratic gain from Republican | | | |

==== 2010 ====
North Carolina House of Representatives 46th district general election, 2010
| Party | Candidate | Votes | % |
|---|---|---|---|
| Republican | G. L. Pridgen | 7,590 | 52.17% |
| Democratic | Douglas Yongue (incumbent) | 6,958 | 47.83% |
| Total votes | | 14,548 | 100% |
| Republican gain from Democratic | | | |

== Personal life ==
Pridgen resides in Lumberton, North Carolina with his wife, Wendy. They have four children and seven grandchildren.

North Carolina House of Representatives
| Preceded by Douglas Yongue | Member of the North Carolina House of Representatives from the 46th district 2011-2013 | Succeeded by Ken Waddell |
