= North Carolina's 16th House district =

American legislative district

North Carolina's 16th State House of Representatives district
Representative
| Carson Smith; R–Hampstead |
- Demographics: 75% White; 10% Black; 8% Hispanic; 1% Asian; 5% Multiracial
- Population (2024): 93,082

North Carolina's 16th House district is one of 120 districts in the North Carolina House of Representatives. It has been represented by Republican Carson Smith since 2019.

== Geography ==
Since 2023, the district has included all of Pender County, as well as part of Onslow County. The district overlaps with the 6th and 9th Senate districts.

== District officeholders ==
=== Multi-member district ===
| Representative | Party | Dates | Notes | Representative | Party | Dates | Notes | Representative | Party | Dates | Notes | Counties |
|---|---|---|---|---|---|---|---|---|---|---|---|---|
District created January 1, 1967.
| James Davis Speed (Louisburg) | Democratic | January 1, 1967 – January 1, 1973 | Redistricted from the Franklin County district. | John Church (Henderson) | Democratic | January 1, 1967 – January 1, 1971 | | | | | | 1967–1973; All of Franklin, Vance, and Warren counties. |
| James Davis Speed (Louisburg) | Democratic | January 1, 1967 – January 1, 1973 | Redistricted from the Franklin County district. | Bobby Rogers (Henderson) | Democratic | January 1, 1971 – January 1, 1973 | Redistricted to the 13th district. | | | | | 1967–1973; All of Franklin, Vance, and Warren counties. |
| Mickey Michaux (Durham) | Democratic | January 1, 1973 – July 18, 1977 | Reigned to become United States Attorney for the Middle District of North Carolina. | Willis Whichard (Durham) | Democratic | January 1, 1973 – January 1, 1975 | Redistricted from the 18th district. Retired to run for State Senate. | George Miller Jr. (Durham) | Democratic | January 1, 1973 – January 1, 1983 | Redistricted from the 18th district. Redistricted to the 23rd district. | 1973–1983; All of Durham County. |
| Mickey Michaux (Durham) | Democratic | January 1, 1973 – July 18, 1977 | Reigned to become United States Attorney for the Middle District of North Carolina. | Pat Griffin (Durham) | Democratic | January 1, 1975 – January 1, 1979 | | George Miller Jr. (Durham) | Democratic | January 1, 1973 – January 1, 1983 | Redistricted from the 18th district. Redistricted to the 23rd district. | 1973–1983; All of Durham County. |
| Vacant | | July 18, 1977 – August 4, 1977 | | Pat Griffin (Durham) | Democratic | January 1, 1975 – January 1, 1979 | | George Miller Jr. (Durham) | Democratic | January 1, 1973 – January 1, 1983 | Redistricted from the 18th district. Redistricted to the 23rd district. | 1973–1983; All of Durham County. |
| A. J. Howard Clement III (Durham) | Democratic | August 4, 1977 – January 1, 1979 | Appointed to finish Michaux's term. | Pat Griffin (Durham) | Democratic | January 1, 1975 – January 1, 1979 | | George Miller Jr. (Durham) | Democratic | January 1, 1973 – January 1, 1983 | Redistricted from the 18th district. Redistricted to the 23rd district. | 1973–1983; All of Durham County. |
| Ken Spaulding (Durham) | Democratic | January 1, 1979 – January 1, 1983 | Redistricted to the 23rd district. | W. Paul Pulley Jr. (Durham) | Democratic | January 1, 1979 – January 1, 1983 | Redistricted to the 23rd district. | George Miller Jr. (Durham) | Democratic | January 1, 1973 – January 1, 1983 | Redistricted from the 18th district. Redistricted to the 23rd district. | 1973–1983; All of Durham County. |
| Sidney Locks (Lumberton) | Democratic | January 1, 1983 – January 1, 1991 | | John Calvin Hasty (Maxton) | Democratic | January 1, 1983 – January 1, 1993 | | Daniel DeVane (Raeford) | Democratic | January 1, 1983 – January 1, 1993 | Redistricted to the single-member district. | 1983–1993; All of Robeson and Hoke counties. Part of Scotland County. |
| Adolph Dial (Pembroke) | Democratic | January 1, 1991 – January 1, 1993 | | John Calvin Hasty (Maxton) | Democratic | January 1, 1983 – January 1, 1993 | | Daniel DeVane (Raeford) | Democratic | January 1, 1983 – January 1, 1993 | Redistricted to the single-member district. | 1983–1993; All of Robeson and Hoke counties. Part of Scotland County. |

=== Single-member district ===
| Representative | Party | Dates | Notes | Counties |
|---|---|---|---|---|
| Daniel DeVane (Raeford) | Democratic | January 1, 1993 – January 18, 1994 | Redistricted from the multi-member district. Resigned. | 1993–2003; Parts of Robeson, Cumberland, Moore, Hoke, and Scotland counties. |
| Vacant | | January 18, 1994 – February 4, 1994 | | 1993–2003; Parts of Robeson, Cumberland, Moore, Hoke, and Scotland counties. |
| Douglas Yongue (Laurinburg) | Democratic | February 4, 1994 – January 1, 2003 | Appointed to finish DeVane's term. Redistricted to the 46th district. | 1993–2003; Parts of Robeson, Cumberland, Moore, Hoke, and Scotland counties. |
| Carolyn Justice (Hampstead) | Republican | January 1, 2003 – January 1, 2013 | Retired. | 2003–2005; All of Pender County. Part of New Hanover County. |
| Carolyn Justice (Hampstead) | Republican | January 1, 2003 – January 1, 2013 | Retired. | 2005–2013; Parts of Pender and New Hanover counties. |
| Chris Millis (Hampstead) | Republican | January 1, 2013 – September 15, 2017 | Resigned. | 2013–2019; All of Pender County. Part of Onslow County. |
| Vacant | | September 15, 2017 – September 26, 2017 | | 2013–2019; All of Pender County. Part of Onslow County. |
| Bob Muller (Hampstead) | Republican | September 26, 2017 – January 1, 2019 | Appointed to finish Millis' term. Retired. | 2013–2019; All of Pender County. Part of Onslow County. |
| Carson Smith (Hampstead) | Republican | January 1, 2019 – Present | | 2019–2023; All of Pender County. Part of Columbus County. |
| Carson Smith (Hampstead) | Republican | January 1, 2019 – Present | | 2023–Present; All of Pender County. Part of Onslow County. |

== Election results ==
=== 2026 ===
North Carolina House of Representatives 16th district Republican primary election, 2026
| Party | Candidate | Votes | % |
|---|---|---|---|
| Republican | Carson Smith (incumbent) | 6,380 | 76.48% |
| Republican | Joshua Patti | 1,962 | 23.52% |
| Total votes | | 8,342 | 100% |

North Carolina House of Representatives 16th district general election, 2026
| Party | Candidate | Votes | % |
|---|---|---|---|
| Republican | Carson Smith (incumbent) | | |
| Democratic | Jim Harris | | |
| Total votes | | | 100% |

=== 2024 ===
North Carolina House of Representatives 16th district general election, 2024
| Party | Candidate | Votes | % |
|---|---|---|---|
| Republican | Carson Smith (incumbent) | 36,170 | 70.84% |
| Democratic | Frances Lakey | 14,892 | 29.16% |
| Total votes | | 51,062 | 100% |
| Republican hold | | | |

=== 2022 ===
North Carolina House of Representatives 16th district general election, 2022
| Party | Candidate | Votes | % |
|---|---|---|---|
| Republican | Carson Smith (incumbent) | 23,902 | 100% |
| Total votes | | 23,902 | 100% |
| Republican hold | | | |

=== 2020 ===
North Carolina House of Representatives 16th district general election, 2020
| Party | Candidate | Votes | % |
|---|---|---|---|
| Republican | Carson Smith (incumbent) | 30,161 | 64.40% |
| Democratic | Debbi Fintak | 16,674 | 35.60% |
| Total votes | | 46,835 | 100% |
| Republican hold | | | |

=== 2018 ===
North Carolina House of Representatives 16th district general election, 2018
| Party | Candidate | Votes | % |
|---|---|---|---|
| Republican | Carson Smith | 18,146 | 59.32% |
| Democratic | John Johnson | 12,443 | 40.68% |
| Total votes | | 30,589 | 100% |
| Republican hold | | | |

=== 2016 ===
North Carolina House of Representatives 16th district general election, 2016
| Party | Candidate | Votes | % |
|---|---|---|---|
| Republican | Chris Millis (incumbent) | 23,649 | 66.98% |
| Democratic | Steve Unger | 11,656 | 33.02% |
| Total votes | | 35,305 | 100% |
| Republican hold | | | |

=== 2014 ===
North Carolina House of Representatives 16th district general election, 2014
| Party | Candidate | Votes | % |
|---|---|---|---|
| Republican | Chris Millis (incumbent) | 14,049 | 66.46% |
| Democratic | Steve Unger | 7,091 | 33.54% |
| Total votes | | 21,140 | 100% |
| Republican hold | | | |

=== 2012 ===
North Carolina House of Representatives 16th district Republican primary election, 2012
| Party | Candidate | Votes | % |
|---|---|---|---|
| Republican | Chris Millis | 4,357 | 64.75% |
| Republican | Timothy "Tim" Thomas | 1,509 | 22.43% |
| Republican | Jeff Howell | 863 | 12.83% |
| Total votes | | 6,729 | 100% |

North Carolina House of Representatives 16th district general election, 2012
| Party | Candidate | Votes | % |
|---|---|---|---|
| Republican | Chris Millis | 22,254 | 100% |
| Total votes | | 22,254 | 100% |
| Republican hold | | | |

=== 2010 ===
North Carolina House of Representatives 16th district general election, 2010
| Party | Candidate | Votes | % |
|---|---|---|---|
| Republican | Carolyn Justice (incumbent) | 21,630 | 69.89% |
| Democratic | Franklin (F. D.) Rivenbark | 9,320 | 30.11% |
| Total votes | | 30,950 | 100% |
| Republican hold | | | |

=== 2008 ===
North Carolina House of Representatives 16th district general election, 2008
| Party | Candidate | Votes | % |
|---|---|---|---|
| Republican | Carolyn Justice (incumbent) | 33,154 | 100% |
| Total votes | | 33,154 | 100% |
| Republican hold | | | |

=== 2006 ===
North Carolina House of Representatives 16th district general election, 2006
| Party | Candidate | Votes | % |
|---|---|---|---|
| Republican | Carolyn Justice (incumbent) | 14,918 | 100% |
| Total votes | | 14,918 | 100% |
| Republican hold | | | |

=== 2004 ===
North Carolina House of Representatives 16th district Republican primary election, 2004
| Party | Candidate | Votes | % |
|---|---|---|---|
| Republican | Carolyn Justice (incumbent) | 3,326 | 60.68% |
| Republican | Rick Catlin | 2,155 | 39.32% |
| Total votes | | 5,481 | 100% |

North Carolina House of Representatives 16th district general election, 2004
| Party | Candidate | Votes | % |
|---|---|---|---|
| Republican | Carolyn Justice (incumbent) | 25,427 | 100% |
| Total votes | | 25,427 | 100% |
| Republican hold | | | |

=== 2002 ===
North Carolina House of Representatives 16th district Democratic primary election, 2002
| Party | Candidate | Votes | % |
|---|---|---|---|
| Democratic | Jack C. Barnes | 1,837 | 36.74% |
| Democratic | FD Rivenbark | 1,831 | 36.62% |
| Democratic | Dwight Strickland | 1,332 | 26.64% |
| Total votes | | 5,000 | 100% |

North Carolina House of Representatives 16th district Republican primary election, 2002
| Party | Candidate | Votes | % |
|---|---|---|---|
| Republican | Carolyn Justice | 2,412 | 73.65% |
| Republican | David R. Greene Sr. | 863 | 26.35% |
| Total votes | | 3,275 | 100% |

North Carolina House of Representatives 16th district general election, 2002
| Party | Candidate | Votes | % |
|---|---|---|---|
| Republican | Carolyn Justice | 11,338 | 55.92% |
| Democratic | Jack C. Barnes | 8,476 | 41.81% |
| Libertarian | Robert J. Smith | 460 | 2.27% |
| Total votes | | 20,274 | 100% |
| Republican win (new seat) | | | |

=== 2000 ===
North Carolina House of Representatives 16th district general election, 2000
| Party | Candidate | Votes | % |
|---|---|---|---|
| Democratic | Douglas Yongue (incumbent) | 11,871 | 64.24% |
| Republican | C. Linwood Faulk | 6,608 | 35.76% |
| Total votes | | 18,479 | 100% |
| Democratic hold | | | |
