= Trinity Christian High School (Monterey) =

Christian school in Monterey, California

Coordinates: 36.613005°N 121.904420°W

Trinity Christian High School, formerly Calvary Christian High School, formerly Calvary Chapel High School is a private, coed, secondary Christian school in Monterey, California. It was established in 2001 by Calvary Chapel Church Monterey Bay as one of the first non-denominational Christian high schools in the Monterey Bay Area. The mission of Trinity Christian High School is to cultivate a stimulating environment, in partnership with the home and local church, which develops the whole student through a Biblically based curriculum and through Christ-centered relationships in order to prepare the student to follow Jesus and to positively impact his/her community and the world.

== Education programs ==
Trinity Christian High School teaches grades nine through twelve. In May 2010, the school was accredited by WASC (Western Association of Schools and Colleges) and ACSI (Association of Christian Schools International). As of October 2012, the student body contained 103 students. The school had a total of 8 full-time teachers and 8 part-time teachers, 40% of which had an advanced degree, and had an average classroom size of 20 students. In the 2012–13 academic year, the yearly tuition cost was US$9,200, and Kathi Lares served as Principal and Timothy S. Wong as director, respectively.
