= Calvary Christian School (King, North Carolina) =

Christian private school in North Carolina

Location
- 536 South Main Street; King, North Carolina 27021; United States
- Coordinates: 36°15′54″N 80°20′31″W

Information
- Type: Private
- Established: 1982 (44 years ago)
- CEEB code: 342031
- Principal: Bradley Nagel
- Teaching staff: Amanda Harris; Angie Mabe; Anthony Keel; Ashlyn Park; Callee Hemric; Christie Jones; Dana Sanford; Dianna Shaffer; Emily Broyhill; Heather Moore; Heather Schwarz; Jean Mack; Jeremy Black; John Foote; Jon Snow; Julie Hooker; Karina Black; Kathy Fryer; Lydia Black; Luke Moore; Lynette Cave; Maddie Spainhour; Melanie Pledger; Michael Lane; Monica Foote; Noell Auten; Pam Karpenko; Ruthann Reeves; Sara Rosario; Sarah Hylton; Savanna Boroughs; Sharon Thompson; Tabitha Kiger; Thi Nguyen; Tracy Carter; Wesley Carter
- Enrollment: 262 (2022–23)
- Student to teacher ratio: 10.5
- Colors: Red, white, and blue
- Mascot: Cougar
- Affiliation: Independent Baptist
- Website: www.ccsking.org

Calvary Christian School (CCS) is a Christian, Independent Baptist private school located in King, North Carolina that was founded in 1982 by Roger Baker. In 2021, an all new "Family-Life Center" was built next to the Calvary Baptist Church.

== History ==
In 1982, Pastor Roger Baker of Calvary Baptist Church in King, North Carolina had a desire to reach young children to Christ and Calvary Christian School was established. Tom Callahan was the first principal of CCS. Currently, Bradley Nagel is the Principal. Anthony Keel is currently the longest running teacher at CCS.

On March 12, 2020, CCS was dramatically affected by the COVID-19 pandemic which led to remote learning for the remainder of the school year. However, CCS began the 2020–2021 school year with no issues and in-class learning while observing social distancing guidelines and masks were optional.

In 2021, a new school building was built next to the Calvary Baptist Church. The 2022–23 school year was the first school year to feature this building.
