= Brenden Jones =

American politician

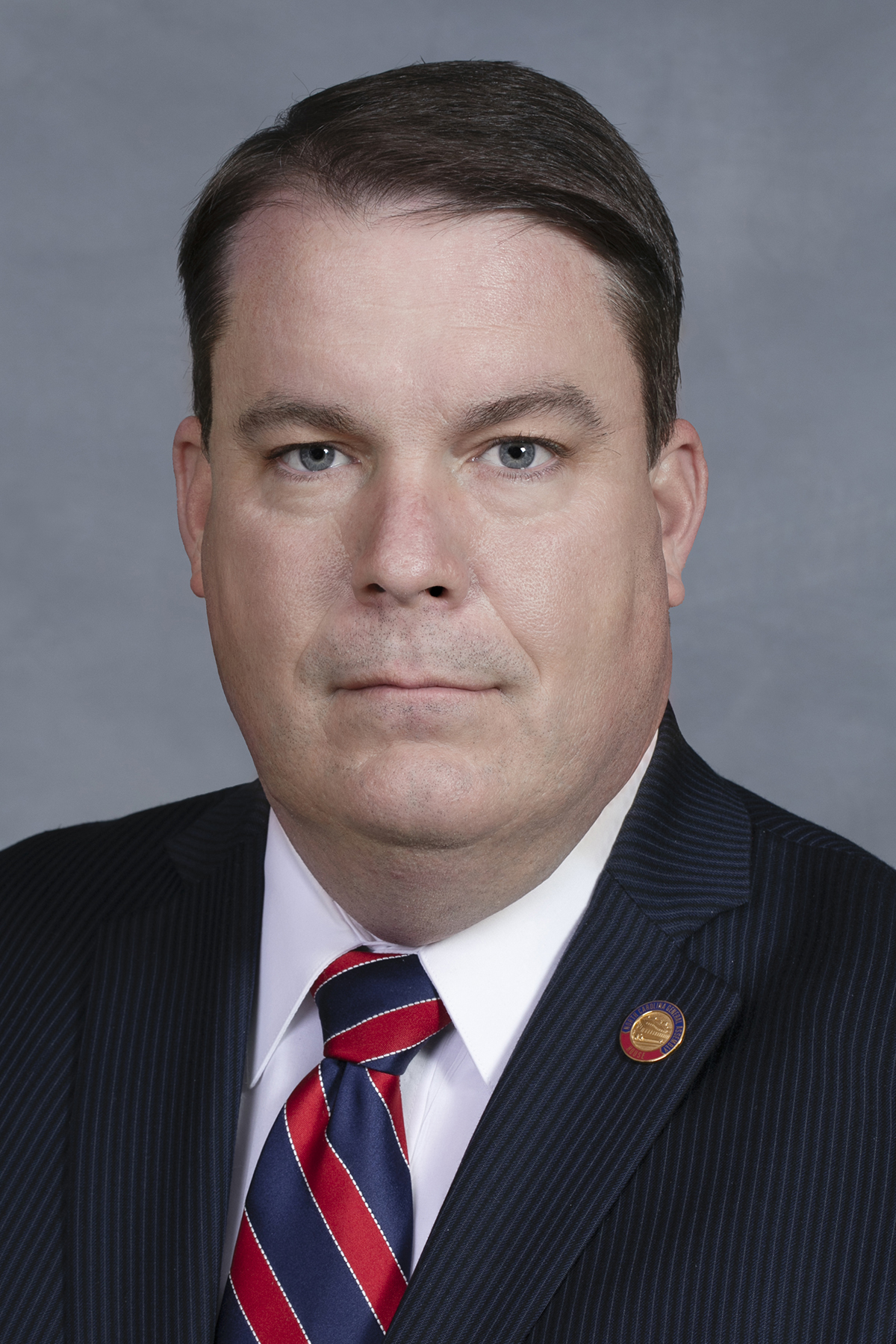

Majority Leader of the North Carolina House of Representatives
- Incumbent
- Assumed office January 8, 2025
- Preceded by: John Bell

Member of the North Carolina House of Representatives from the 46th district
- Incumbent
- Assumed office January 1, 2017
- Preceded by: Ken Waddell

Personal details
- Born: Brenden Harding Jones Columbus County, North Carolina, U.S.
- Party: Republican
- Education: Fayetteville Technical Community College (attended)

Brenden Harding Jones is an American politician and entrepreneur from the state of North Carolina. He is a member of the North Carolina House of Representatives from the Republican Party, representing the 46th district. He was first elected in November 2016.

== Political career ==
Jones has participated in the 2014, 2016, 2018, 2020, 2022, and 2024 general elections for NC House of Representatives District 46.

In 2022 and 2024, Jones ran unopposed in the election.

== Political positions ==
=== LGBTQ+ rights ===
In 2017, Jones introduced HB562, a bathroom bill which would make it harder for transgender people to use public bathrooms by imposing harsher penalties for "trespassing". This was 4 days after partial repeal of the Public Facilities Privacy & Security Act. He is opposed to allowing men and women to share public restrooms and changing facilities.

=== Covid-19 ===
Jones has voiced his opposition to COVID-19 vaccine mandates, even for healthcare systems in NC. He voted to end federal unemployment benefits linked to the COVID-19 pandemic relief for workers.

== Election results ==
Jones first ran for a seat in the NC House of Representatives in 2014 and lost to incumbent Kenneth Waddell(D). A primary election took place on May 6, 2014. The general election took place on November 4, 2014. The signature filing deadline for candidates wishing to run in this election was February 28, 2014. Incumbent Ken Waddell was unopposed in the Democratic primary, while Brenden Jones was unopposed in the Republican primary. Waddell defeated Jones in the general election. 2014 Jones' website highlighted the following campaign themes: Keeping Taxes Low, Reining in Government Spending, Supporting our Teachers, Stimulating Private-Sector Job Growth, Fighting for Rural Transportation, Standing Strong for Our Values,

=== 2024 ===
North Carolina House of Representatives 46th district general election, 2024
Party	Candidate	Votes	%
Republican	Brenden Jones (incumbent)	29,064	100%
Total votes		29,064	100%
Republican hold			

=== 2022 ===
North Carolina House of Representatives 46th district general election, 2022
Party	Candidate	Votes	%
Republican	Brenden Jones (incumbent)	19,928	100%
Total votes		19,928	100%
Republican hold			

=== 2020 ===
North Carolina House of Representatives 46th district general election, 2020
Party	Candidate	Votes	%
Republican	Brenden Jones (incumbent)	17,555	60.69%
Democratic	Tim Heath	11,369	39.31%
Total votes		28,924	100%
Republican hold			

=== 2018 ===
North Carolina House of Representatives 46th district general election, 2018
Party	Candidate	Votes	%
Republican	Brenden Jones (incumbent)	12,687	63.35%
Democratic	Barbara S. Yates-Lockamy	7,339	36.65%
Total votes		20,026	100%
Republican hold			

=== 2016 ===
North Carolina House of Representatives 46th district general election, 2016
Party	Candidate	Votes	%
Republican	Brenden Jones	19,607	60.34%
Democratic	Tim Benton	11,836	36.42%
Libertarian	Thomas Howell Jr.	1,052	3.24%
Total votes		32,495	100%
Republican gain from Democratic			

=== 2014 ===
North Carolina House of Representatives 46th district general election, 2014
Party	Candidate	Votes	%
Democratic	Ken Waddell (incumbent)	11,551	53.42%
Republican	Brenden Jones	10,073	46.58%
Total votes		21,624	100%
Democratic hold			

=== North Carolina House of Representatives ===
==== Standing or select committees (2019–2020 session) ====
- Appropriations, Information Technology, Chairman
- House select Committee on Disaster Relief, Chairman
- Appropriations, Vice-chairman
- Energy and Public Utilities, Vice-chairman
- Agriculture
- House Select Committee on COVID-19

==== Non-standing committees (2019–2020 session) ====
- Joint Legislative Commission on Governmental Operations
- Joint Legislative Oversight Committee on Information Technology
- Joint Legislative Commission on Energy Policy
- Joint Legislative Emergency Management Oversight Committee
- Joint Select Committee on Storm-Related River Debris/Damage in North Carolina, Co-chair

==== 2021-2022 Session ====
Jones was assigned to the following committees:

- Appropriations on Information Technology Committee,
- Appropriations on Transportation Committee, Senior chair
- Energy and Public Utilities Committee
- Federal Relations and American Indian Affairs Committee, Vice chair,
- Rules, Calendar, and Operations of the House Committee, Vice chair,
- Agriculture Committee,
- Appropriations Committee, Vice chair,
- House Transportation Committee, Chair

== Personal life ==
Jones is a third generation car dealer. He and his wife, Angela, are the owner of Meares & Jones Funeral Service in Fair Bluff, North Carolina. He is also a deacon at Tabor City Baptist Church.

North Carolina House of Representatives
Preceded by John Bell	Majority Leader of the North Carolina House of Representatives; 2025–present	Incumbent
