= King, North Carolina =

- City
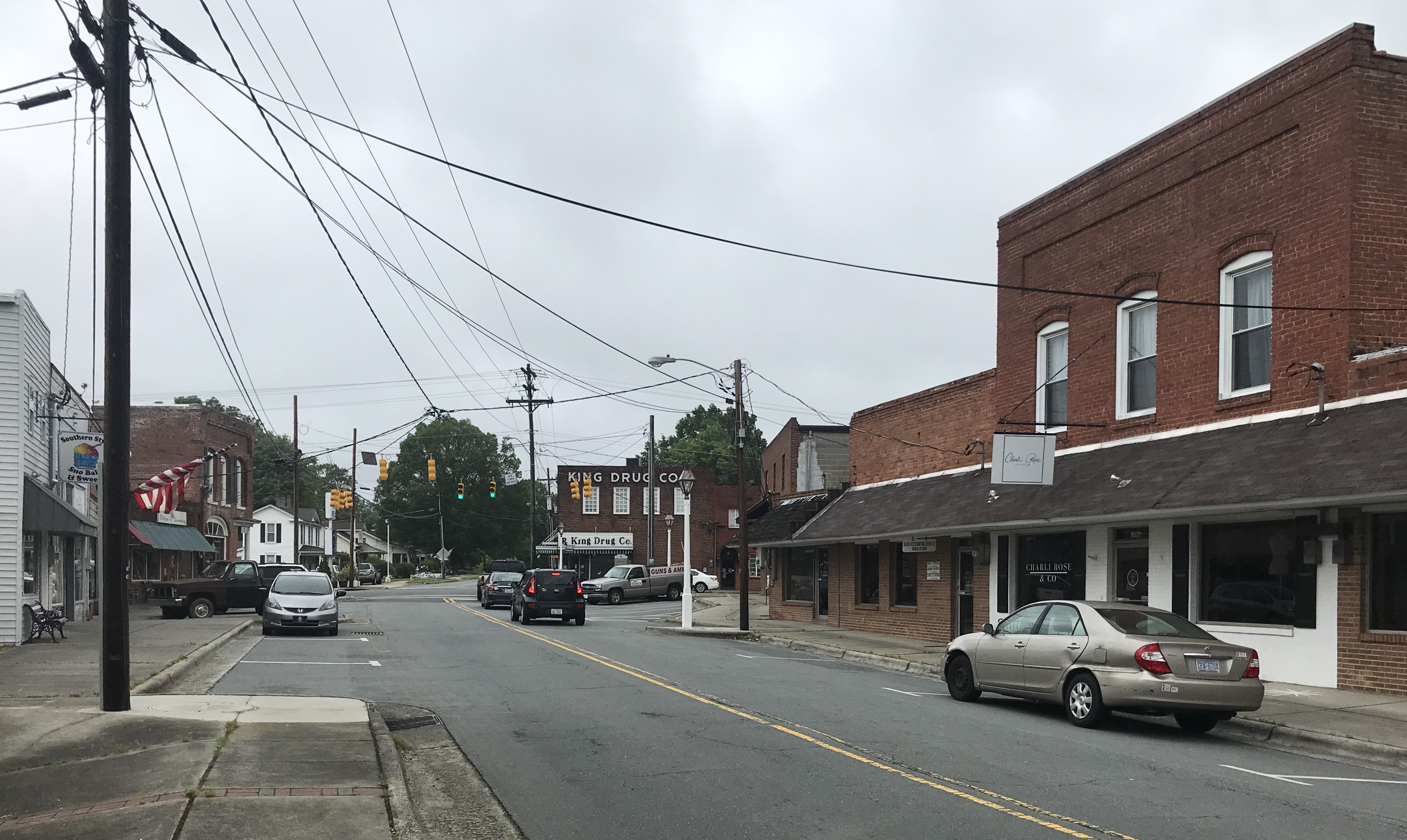
- South Main Street in King

- Flag Seal
- Nickname: Gateway To The Foothills
- Location within North Carolina
- Coordinates: 36°16′37″N 80°21′24″W
- Country: United States
- State: North Carolina
- Counties: Stokes, Forsyth
- Incorporated: 1983
- Named for: Charles and Frances King's Cabin

Government
  - Type: Mayor-Council
  - Mayor: Rick McCraw
  - City Manager: Scott Barrow

Area
  - Total: 6.10 sq mi (15.80 km^{2})
  - Land: 6.05 sq mi (15.66 km^{2})
  - Water: 0.054 sq mi (0.14 km^{2})
- Elevation: 1,063 ft (324 m)

Population (2020)
  - Total: 7,197
  - Density: 1,190.5/sq mi (459.66/km^{2})
- Time zone: UTC-5 (Eastern (EST))
  - Summer (DST): UTC-4 (EDT)
- ZIP code: 27021
- Area code: 336
- FIPS code: 37-35760
- GNIS feature ID: 2404830
- Website: www.ci.king.nc.us

King is a city in Stokes and Forsyth counties, North Carolina, United States. The population was 7,096 at the 2020 census. King is part of the Piedmont Triad metropolitan area, located 15 miles (24 km) northwest of Winston-Salem.

== History ==
The town was originally called "King's Cabin". Charles and Francis King lived in a cabin owned by Francis's father for a short time in the 1830s. Being Quakers and against slavery, the King family moved to the free North. According to television journalist and historian Chad Tucker's book Images of America, King (2006), after the King family left their home it was used by locals as a landmark or reference point in giving directions. Several decades later when a post office was established in 1888 it was named for that reference point, King's Cabin. The railroad laid tracks a few years later and shortened the name to "King" in its business transactions, and to eliminate confusion the post office followed on September 26, 1894. Charles and Francis King never returned to Stokes County and never knew their former home became the namesake of a town.

According to Tucker, the community grew into an unincorporated town of schools and businesses. With the first automobile arriving by train in October 1911, new highways followed. With new roads, the town's proximity to Winston-Salem, and a new four-lane Highway 52 built in the 1960s, King opened its doors to growth, turning farmland into subdivisions. Community groups acted as an unofficial town council, providing services such as a fire department, water and sewer. On September 13, 1983, King became an incorporated city, 95 years after the King's Cabin post office opened.

The King Historic District is listed on the National Register of Historic Places.

== Geography ==
King is located in southern Stokes County, with parts of the city limits extending south into Forsyth County. Interstate 74 traverses the city south and west of the center, with access from Exit 123, with I-74 also traversing concurrently with U.S. Route 52. Downtown Winston-Salem is 16 miles (26 km) southeast, and Mount Airy is 21 miles (34 km) to the northwest. Pilot Mountain State Park is 8 miles (13 km) to the northwest and Hanging Rock State Park is 16 miles (26 km) to the north. It's a 40-minute drive to the Blue Ridge Mountains via the Blue Ridge Parkway.

According to the United States Census Bureau, the city has a total area of 5.9 square miles (15.3 km^{2}), of which 5.8 square miles (15.1 km^{2}) is land and 0.04 square miles (0.1 km^{2}), or 0.93%, is water.

== Demographics ==
Historical population
Census	Pop.	Note	%±
1990	4,059		—
2000	5,952		46.6%
2010	6,904		16.0%
2020	7,197		4.2%
2025 (est.)	7,977	▲	10.8%
U.S. Decennial Census

=== 2020 census ===
As of the 2020 census, King had a population of 7,197. The median age was 46.9 years. 20.3% of residents were under the age of 18 and 24.5% of residents were 65 years of age or older. For every 100 females there were 86.4 males, and for every 100 females age 18 and over there were 81.4 males age 18 and over.

96.2% of residents lived in urban areas, while 3.8% lived in rural areas.

There were 2,989 households and 1,954 families in King, of which 29.1% had children under the age of 18 living in them. Of all households, 48.3% were married-couple households, 15.4% were households with a male householder and no spouse or partner present, and 31.7% were households with a female householder and no spouse or partner present. About 32.0% of all households were made up of individuals and 18.3% had someone living alone who was 65 years of age or older.

There were 3,159 housing units, of which 5.4% were vacant. The homeowner vacancy rate was 1.4% and the rental vacancy rate was 4.1%.

King racial composition
Race	Number	Percentage
White (non-Hispanic)	6,397	88.88%
Black or African American (non-Hispanic)	166	2.31%
Native American	19	0.26%
Asian	80	1.11%
Other/Mixed	244	3.39%
Hispanic or Latino	291	4.04%

== Education ==
The portion in Stokes County (the majority of the municipality) is within the Stokes County Schools school district.

Schools

- West Stokes High School
- North Stokes
- South Stokes
- Meadowbrook Academy
- Stokes Early College
- 11 elementary schools
- 2 middle schools

The portion in Forsyth County is within the Winston-Salem/Forsyth County Schools school district.

Private School

- Calvary Christian School

== Media ==
=== Print ===
- The Stokes News - a weekly newspaper headquartered in King, serving Stokes County and nearby areas.

== Notable people ==
- Rex L. Baker, former member of the North Carolina General Assembly
- Tom Baker, professional bowler
- Billy J. Boles, retired United States Air Force four-star general
- Sam Gibson, former MLB pitcher
- William C. McGee, former member of the North Carolina General Assembly
- Kenny Dennard, former Duke university basketball star and an NBA player with the KC Kings and the Denver Nuggets
