= Edgar V. Starnes =

American politician from North Carolina

Edgar Starnes
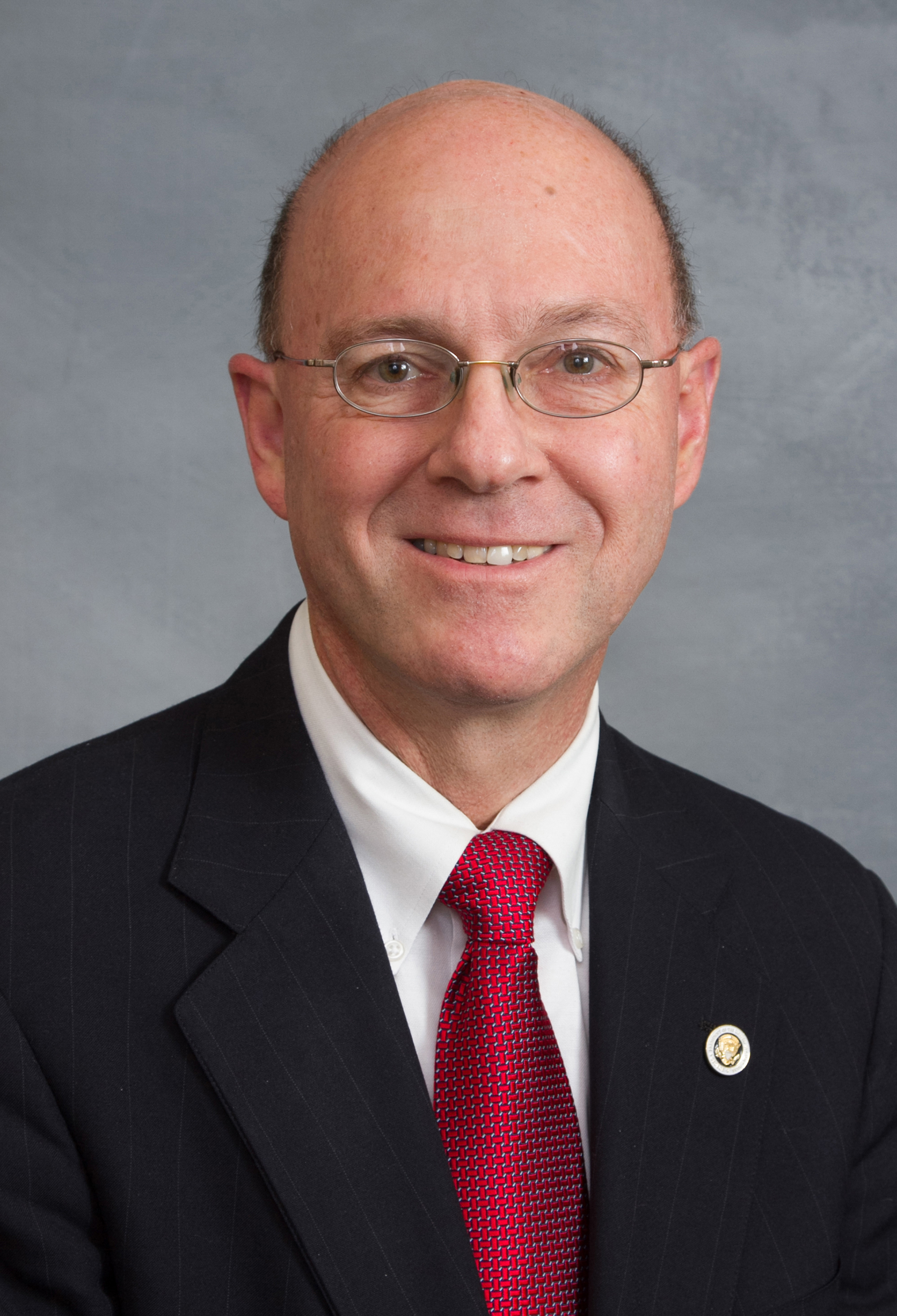

Majority Leader of the North Carolina House of Representatives
- In office January 1, 2013 – January 1, 2015
- Preceded by: Paul Stam
- Succeeded by: Mike Hager

Member of the North Carolina House of Representatives
- In office January 1, 1997 – January 13, 2015
- Preceded by: George Robinson
- Succeeded by: George Robinson
- Constituency: 91st district (1997–2003); 87th district (2003–2015)
- In office January 1, 1987 – January 1, 1989
- Preceded by: George Robinson
- Succeeded by: George Robinson; David Flaherty
- Constituency: 46th district

Personal details
- Born: Edgar Vance Starnes; September 3, 1956 (age 69) Granite Falls, North Carolina, U.S.
- Party: Republican
- Education: Carson-Newman University (BA)
- Website: Campaign website

Edgar Vance Starnes (born September 3, 1956) is a North Carolina politician and an investor in real estate. He served as a Republican member of the North Carolina House of Representatives for a total of approximately 20 years, from 1987 to 1988 and from 1997 through January 2015. He then resigned to become legislative liaison for North Carolina State Treasurer Janet Cowell. At the time of his resignation, Starnes represented the state's eighty-seventh House district (Caldwell County).

== North Carolina House of Representatives ==
He was elected House Majority Leader by his colleagues in December 2012, for the legislative session beginning in January 2013. After the 2014 election, in which he was re-elected to the House without opposition, Starnes chose not to seek a second term as Majority Leader because he was already discussing the position with the State Treasurer's office.

=== Nullification resolution ===
In April 2013, Starnes and ten Republican colleagues introduced House Bill 494, a resolution in the Assembly which repudiates any federal court power in ruling on any Constitutional topic in North Carolina, a legally discredited theory known to historians of the antebellum U.S. as nullification.

"The Constitution of the United States does not grant the federal government and does not grant the federal courts the power to determine what is or is not constitutional; therefore, by virtue of the Tenth Amendment to the Constitution of the United States, the power to determine constitutionality and the proper interpretation and proper application of the Constitution is reserved to the states and to the people," the resolution asserts, continuing, "Each state in the union is sovereign and may independently determine how that state may make laws respecting an establishment of religion".

=== Electoral history ===
==== 2014 ====
North Carolina House of Representatives 87th district general election, 2014
Party	Candidate	Votes	%
Republican	Edgar Starnes (incumbent)	16,148	100%
Total votes		16,148	100%
Republican hold			

==== 2012 ====
North Carolina House of Representatives 87th district Republican primary election, 2012
Party	Candidate	Votes	%
Republican	Edgar Starnes (incumbent)	8,472	70.07%
Republican	Jordon Greene	3,619	29.93%
Total votes		12,091	100%

North Carolina House of Representatives 87th district general election, 2012
Party	Candidate	Votes	%
Republican	Edgar Starnes (incumbent)	25,757	100%
Total votes		25,757	100%
Republican hold			

==== 2010 ====
North Carolina House of Representatives 87th district general election, 2010
Party	Candidate	Votes	%
Republican	Edgar Starnes (incumbent)	14,295	100%
Total votes		14,295	100%
Republican hold			

==== 2008 ====
North Carolina House of Representatives 87th district general election, 2008
Party	Candidate	Votes	%
Republican	Edgar Starnes (incumbent)	15,444	52.76%
Democratic	John A. Forlines Jr.	11,487	39.24%
Libertarian	Timothy J. "T. J." Rohr	2,342	8.00%
Total votes		29,273	100%
Republican hold			

==== 2006 ====
North Carolina House of Representatives 87th district general election, 2006
Party	Candidate	Votes	%
Republican	Edgar Starnes (incumbent)	11,548	100%
Total votes		11,548	100%
Republican hold			

==== 2004 ====
North Carolina House of Representatives 87th district general election, 2004
Party	Candidate	Votes	%
Republican	Edgar Starnes (incumbent)	15,519	59.84%
Democratic	Woody Tucker	10,415	40.16%
Total votes		25,934	100%
Republican hold			

==== 2002 ====
North Carolina House of Representatives 87th district general election, 2002
Party	Candidate	Votes	%
Republican	Edgar Starnes (incumbent)	11,813	51.48%
Democratic	Ray Warren	11,132	48.52%
Total votes		22,945	100%
Republican hold			

==== 2000 ====
North Carolina House of Representatives 91st district general election, 2000
Party	Candidate	Votes	%
Republican	Edgar Starnes (incumbent)	15,050	85.98%
Libertarian	Joe Young	2,454	14.02%
Total votes		17,504	100%
Republican hold			

North Carolina House of Representatives
Preceded by Paul Stam	Majority Leader of the North Carolina House of Representatives; 2013–2015	Succeeded by Mike Hager
