= Granite Falls, North Carolina =

- Town
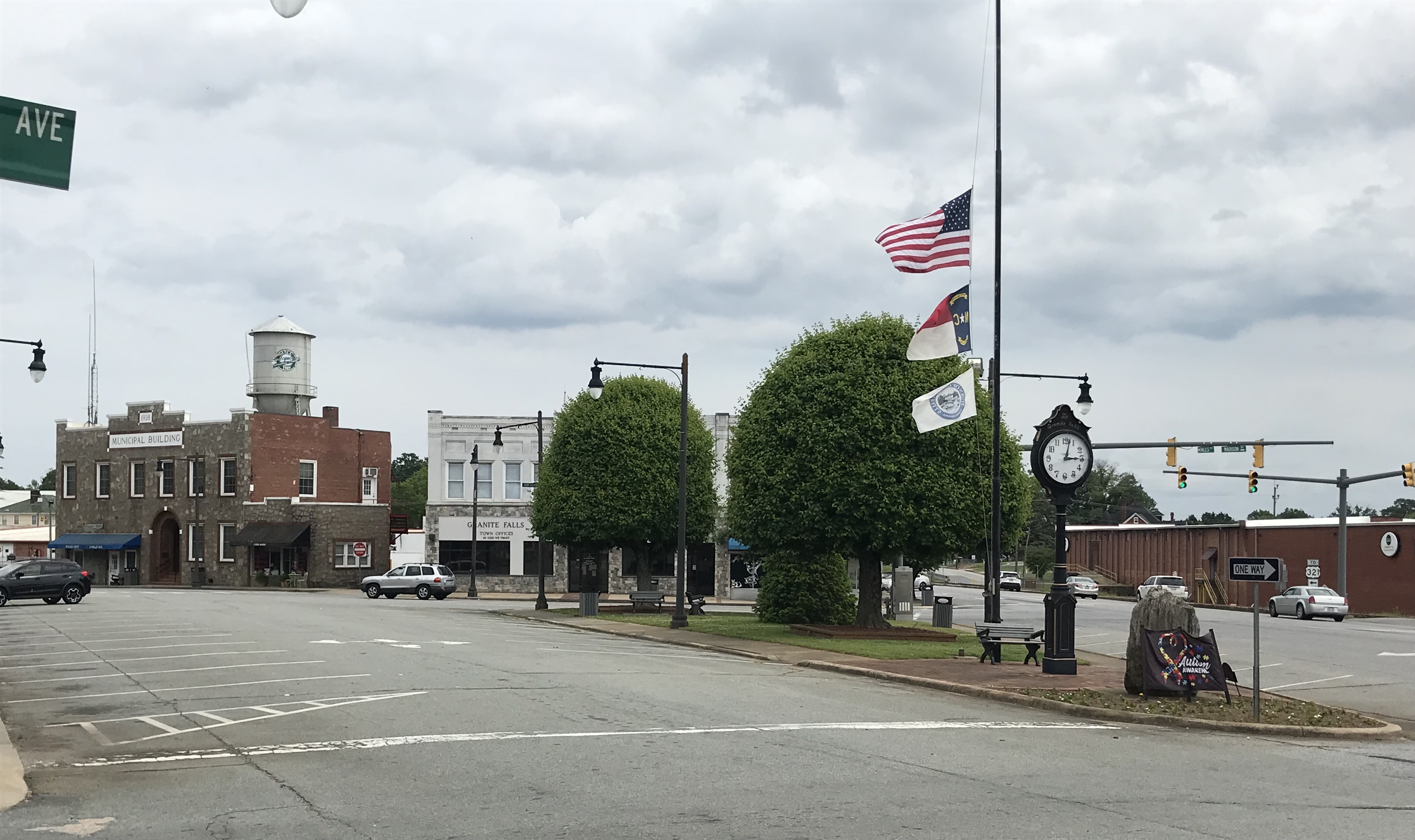
- Downtown Granite Falls, as viewed facing southeast on Main Street

- Seal

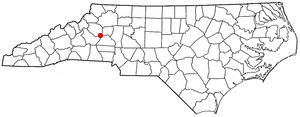
- Location of Granite Falls, North Carolina
- Coordinates: 35°47′49″N 81°25′26″W
- Country: United States
- State: North Carolina
- County: Caldwell

Area
  - Total: 4.98 sq mi (12.90 km^{2})
  - Land: 4.94 sq mi (12.79 km^{2})
  - Water: 0.042 sq mi (0.11 km^{2})
- Elevation: 1,099 ft (335 m)

Population (2020)
  - Total: 4,965
  - Density: 1,005.8/sq mi (388.33/km^{2})
- Time zone: UTC-5 (Eastern (EST))
  - Summer (DST): UTC-4 (EDT)
- ZIP code: 28630
- Area code: 828
- FIPS code: 37-27420
- GNIS feature ID: 2406601
- Website: granitefallsnc.gov

Granite Falls is a town in Caldwell County, North Carolina, United States. As of the 2020 census, Granite Falls had a population of 4,965. It is part of the Hickory–Lenoir–Morganton Metropolitan Statistical Area.

== History ==
The name Granite Falls comes from the waters that splash over the granite boulders spanning Gunpowder Creek. In 1791, pioneer Andrew Baird began operating an iron works beside Gunpowder Creek, and in doing so, became owner of all the land now occupied by the Town of Granite Falls. The community would start to form from that point.

Granite Falls was incorporated as a town in 1899. Before its incorporation, Granite Falls went by other names such as Baird's Forge, Catawba View, Lovelady, and Granite.

In 1952, Evelyn Kent was elected Mayor of Granite Falls, NC, serving from 1952-1954. She was one of the first women to be elected as a Mayor in the state of North Carolina.

== Geography ==
Granite Falls is located near the southern border of Caldwell County. It is bordered to the south by the town of Rhodhiss, to the southwest by Lake Rhodhiss on the Catawba River (Lake Hickory), and to the west by the town of Sawmills. The center of town is located on a ridge between the Catawba River to the west and Gunpowder Creek, a tributary of the Catawba, to the east.

U.S. Route 321 (Hickory Boulevard) is a four-lane highway that passes through the eastern side of town; it leads 6 miles (10 km) southeast to the center of Hickory and 10 miles (16 km) northwest to Lenoir, the Caldwell County seat. US 321 Alternate runs through the center of Granite Falls as North and South Main Street.

According to the United States Census Bureau, the town has a total area of 5.3 square miles (13.6 km^{2}), of which 5.2 square miles (13.5 km^{2}) is land and 0.04 square miles (0.1 km^{2}), or 0.84%, is water.

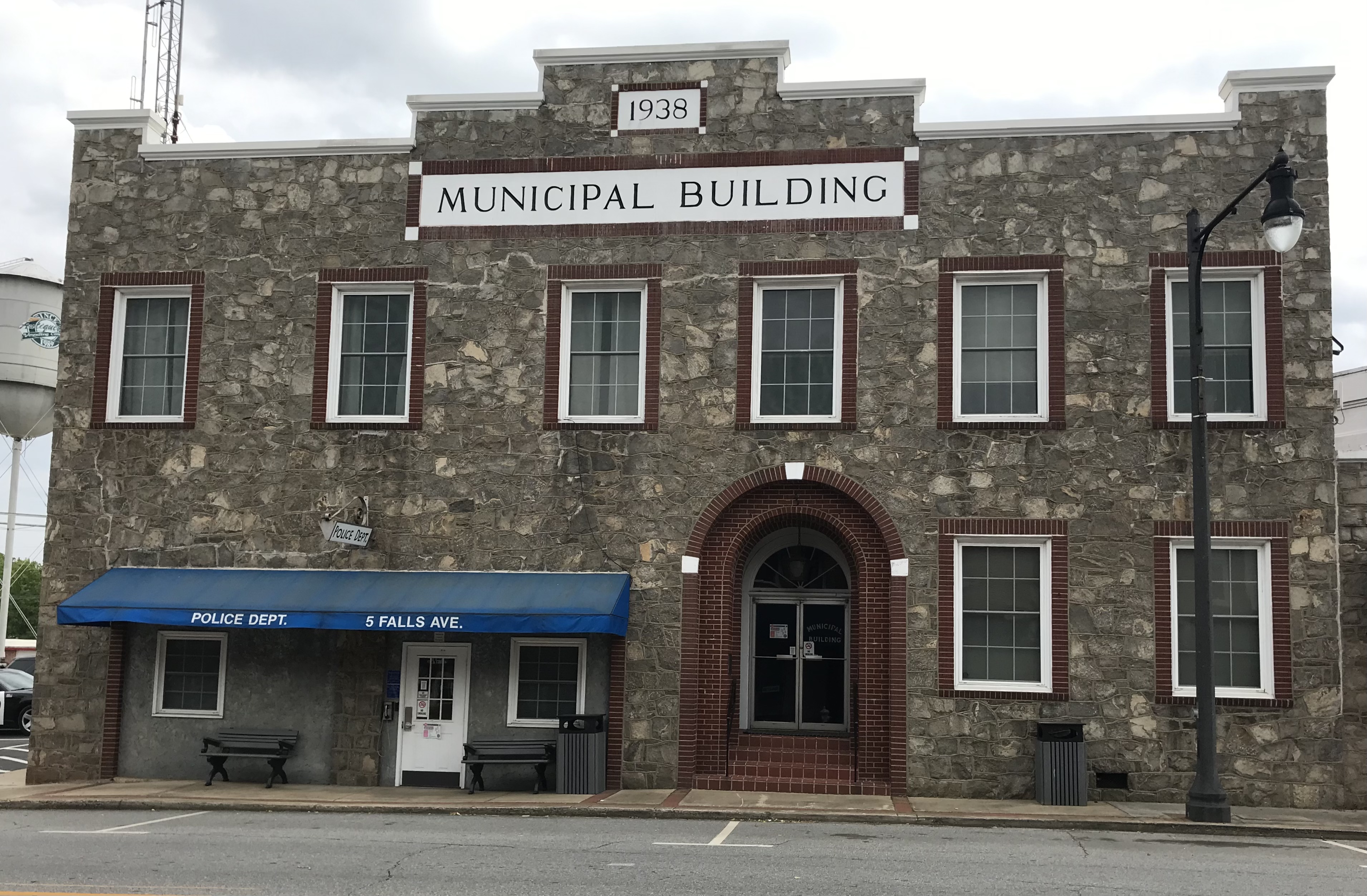
Granite Falls Municipal Building

== Demographics ==
Historical population
Census	Pop.	Note	%±
1900	277		—
1910	381		37.5%
1920	1,101		189.0%
1930	2,147		95.0%
1940	1,873		−12.8%
1950	2,286		22.1%
1960	2,644		15.7%
1970	2,388		−9.7%
1980	2,580		8.0%
1990	3,253		26.1%
2000	4,612		41.8%
2010	4,722		2.4%
2020	4,965		5.1%
U.S. Decennial Census

=== 2020 census ===
Granite Falls racial composition
Race	Number	Percentage
White (non-Hispanic)	4,189	84.37%
Black or African American (non-Hispanic)	164	3.3%
Native American	11	0.22%
Asian	39	0.79%
Pacific Islander	2	0.04%
Other/Mixed	223	4.49%
Hispanic or Latino	337	6.79%

As of the 2020 census, Granite Falls had a population of 4,965. The median age was 42.0 years. 21.6% of residents were under the age of 18 and 19.4% of residents were 65 years of age or older. For every 100 females there were 91.8 males, and for every 100 females age 18 and over there were 87.4 males age 18 and over.

90.9% of residents lived in urban areas, while 9.1% lived in rural areas.

There were 1,970 households in Granite Falls, of which 32.8% had children under the age of 18 living in them. Of all households, 46.3% were married-couple households, 16.4% were households with a male householder and no spouse or partner present, and 30.2% were households with a female householder and no spouse or partner present. About 26.7% of all households were made up of individuals and 11.3% had someone living alone who was 65 years of age or older.

There were 2,105 housing units, of which 6.4% were vacant. The homeowner vacancy rate was 1.5% and the rental vacancy rate was 4.8%.

=== 2000 census ===
As of the census of 2000, there were 4,612 people, 1,758 households, and 1,211 families residing in the town. The population density was 1,080.4 inhabitants per square mile (417.1/km^{2}). There were 1,849 housing units at an average density of 433.1 per square mile (167.2/km^{2}). The racial makeup of the town was 92.06% White, 2.34% African American, 0.17% Native American, 0.39% Asian, 0.07% Pacific Islander, 3.95% from other races, and 1.02% from two or more races. Hispanic or Latino of any race were 6.07% of the population.

There were 1,758 households, out of which 33.9% had children under the age of 18 living with them, 52.3% were married couples living together, 12.9% had a female householder with no husband present, and 31.1% were non-families. 25.4% of all households were made up of individuals, and 11.8% had someone living alone who was 65 years of age or older. The average household size was 2.53 and the average family size was 3.01.

In the town, the population was spread out, with 24.4% under the age of 18, 8.8% from 18 to 24, 31.1% from 25 to 44, 20.7% from 45 to 64, and 15.0% who were 65 years of age or older. The median age was 36 years. For every 100 females, there were 89.4 males. For every 100 females age 18 and over, there were 84.9 males.

The median income for a household in the town was $38,596, and the median income for a family was $47,064. Males had a median income of $28,309 versus $21,374 for females. The per capita income for the town was $17,750. About 5.7% of families and 8.2% of the population were below the poverty line, including 10.6% of those under age 18 and 9.7% of those age 65 or over.

== Education ==
=== High school ===
- South Caldwell High School (Hudson address)

=== Middle school ===
- Granite Falls Middle School

=== Elementary schools ===
- Baton Elementary School
- Dudley Shoals Elementary School
- Granite Falls Elementary School
- Sawmills Elementary School

=== Alternative school ===
- Gateway School (grades 6–12)

== Media ==
- Kicks 103.3, Kicks 103.3, local radio station
- WJRI, News Talk 1340 WJRI, local radio station
- WKGX, AM 1080 WKGX, local radio station
- WYCV AM 900, local radio station
- WAIZ, "63 Big Ways", AM 630, local radio station featuring 1950s and 1960s oldies

== Notable people ==
- Madison Bumgarner, MLB pitcher, 4x All-Star selection, 3x World Series champion and 2014 World Series MVP
- Eric Church, country music singer-songwriter
- Charlie Cozart, former MLB player
- Jack Curtis, former MLB player
- Sara Payne Hayden, Women Airforce Service Pilots member
- Donnie Kirkpatrick, college football coach
- Cyndee Peters, American-Swedish gospel singer and author
- Edgar V. Starnes, politician and real estate investor
- Amy H. Sturgis, author, speaker, and scholar of science fiction/fantasy studies and Native American studies
- Jeff Triplette, former NFL referee
- Maxie Williams, former NFL offensive lineman
