= Cedar Rock, North Carolina =

- Village
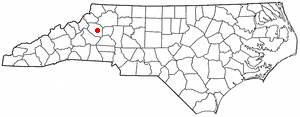
- Location of Cedar Rock, North Carolina
- Coordinates: 35°56′36″N 81°27′30″W
- Country: United States
- State: North Carolina
- County: Caldwell

Area
  - Total: 1.14 sq mi (2.95 km^{2})
  - Land: 1.14 sq mi (2.95 km^{2})
  - Water: 0 sq mi (0.00 km^{2})
- Elevation: 1,171 ft (357 m)

Population (2020)
  - Total: 301
  - Density: 263.9/sq mi (101.88/km^{2})
- Time zone: UTC-5 (Eastern (EST))
  - Summer (DST): UTC-4 (EDT)
- ZIP code: 28645
- Area code: 828
- FIPS code: 37-11352
- GNIS feature ID: 2407428
- Website: https://www.villageofcedarrock.org/

Cedar Rock is a village in Caldwell County, North Carolina, United States. As of the 2020 census, Cedar Rock had a population of 301.

== Geography ==
Cedar Rock is located in east-central Caldwell County northeast of Lenoir, the county seat. The village surrounds the Cedar Rock Country Club and climbs the northern slopes of the Brushy Mountains.

According to the United States Census Bureau, the village has a total area of 1.2 square miles (3.0 km^{2}), all land.

== Demographics ==
Historical population
Census	Pop.	Note	%±
2000	315		—
2010	300		−4.8%
2020	301		0.3%
U.S. Decennial Census

=== 2020 census ===
Cedar Rock racial composition
Race	Number	Percentage
White (non-Hispanic)	284	94.35%
Asian	1	0.33%
Other/Mixed	8	2.66%
Hispanic or Latino	8	2.66%

As of the 2020 United States census, there were 301 people, 109 households, and 86 families residing in the village.

=== 2000 census ===
As of the census of 2000, there were 315 people, 123 households, and 110 families residing in the village. The population density was 283.2 inhabitants per square mile (109.3/km^{2}). There were 126 housing units at an average density of 113.3 per square mile (43.7/km^{2}). The racial makeup of the village was 98.41% White, 0.32% Asian, 1.27% from other races. Hispanic or Latino of any race were 0.32% of the population.

There were 123 households, out of which 26.8% had children under the age of 18 living with them, 87.0% were married couples living together, 2.4% had a female householder with no husband present, and 9.8% were non-families. 9.8% of all households were made up of individuals, and 6.5% had someone living alone who was 65 years of age or older. The average household size was 2.56 and the average family size was 2.73.

In the village, the population was spread out, with 19.4% under the age of 18, 4.1% from 18 to 24, 15.9% from 25 to 44, 41.0% from 45 to 64, and 19.7% who were 65 years of age or older. The median age was 50 years. For every 100 females, there were 100.6 males. For every 100 females age 18 and over, there were 92.4 males.

The median income for a household in the village was $116,686, and the median income for a family was $128,975. Males had a median income of $90,950 versus $40,625 for females. The per capita income for the village was $66,022. None of the families and 0.7% of the population were living below the poverty line, including no under eighteens and none of those over 64.
