= 2004 North Carolina House of Representatives election =

- November 2, 2004

All 120 seats in the North Carolina House of Representatives 61 seats needed for a majority
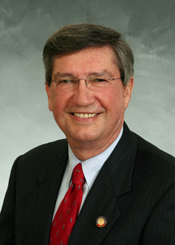

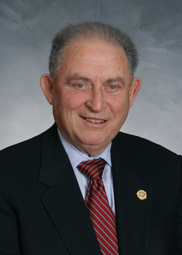
	Majority party	Minority party
Leader	Jim Black	Joe Kiser
Party	Democratic	Republican
Leader since	January 1, 1999	January 1, 2003
Leader's seat	100th - Matthews	97th - Vale
Last election	59	61
Seats before	59	61 (Note: This figure includes Michael Decker who was re-elected in 2002 as a Republican and ran for re-election in 2004 as a Republican, despite the fact that he spent most of 2003-2004 session as a Democrat)
Seats won	63	57
Seat change	▲4	▼4
Popular vote	1,361,804	1,490,695
Percentage	46.68%	51.10%
- Results: Democratic gain Democratic hold Republican hold
Speaker before election
Jim Black &
Richard Morgan
Coalition
Elected Speaker
Jim Black
Democratic

An election was held on November 2, 2004 to elect all 120 members to North Carolina's House of Representatives. The election coincided with elections for other offices, including the Presidency, U.S Senate, Governorship, U.S. House of Representatives, Council of State, and state senate. The primary election was held on July 20, 2004 with a run-off occurring on August 17, 2004. These elections were the first to use new district lines drawn by the General Assembly to account the for changes in population amongst each of the districts after the 2000 census. The 2002 elections had been conducted under a map ordered by the North Carolina Superior Court.

== Results summary ==
District	Incumbent	Party	Elected	Party
1st	Bill Owens	Dem	Bill Owens	Dem
2nd	Bill Culpepper	Dem	Bill Culpepper	Dem
3rd	Michael Gorman	Rep	Alice Graham Underhill	Dem
4th	New Seat		Russell Tucker	Dem
5th	Howard Hunter Jr.	Dem	Howard Hunter Jr.	Dem
6th	Arthur Williams	Dem	Arthur Williams	Dem
6th	Charles Elliott Johnson† (Note: Redistricted from the 4th District.)	Dem	Arthur Williams	Dem
7th	John Hall	Dem	John Hall	Dem
8th	Edith Warren	Dem	Edith Warren	Dem
9th	Marian McLawhorn	Dem	Marian McLawhorn	Dem
10th	Stephen LaRoque	Rep	Stephen LaRoque	Rep
11th	Louis Pate	Rep	Louis Pate	Rep
12th	William Wainwright	Dem	William Wainwright	Dem
13th	Jean Preston	Rep	Jean Preston	Rep
14th	Keith Williams	Rep	George Cleveland	Rep
15th	Robert Grady	Rep	Robert Grady	Rep
16th	Carolyn Justice	Rep	Carolyn Justice	Rep
17th	Bonner Stiller	Rep	Bonner Stiller	Rep
18th	Thomas Wright	Dem	Thomas Wright	Dem
19th	Danny McComas	Rep	Danny McComas	Rep
20th	Dewey Hill	Dem	Dewey Hill	Dem
21st	Larry Bell	Dem	Larry Bell	Dem
22nd	Edd Nye	Dem	Edd Nye	Dem
23rd	Joe Tolson	Dem	Joe Tolson	Dem
24th	Jean Farmer-Butterfield	Dem	Jean Farmer-Butterfield	Dem
25th	Bill Daughtridge	Rep	Bill Daughtridge	Rep
26th	Leo Daughtry (Note: Redistricted from the 28th District.)	Rep	Leo Daughtry	Rep
26th	Billy Creech†	Rep	Leo Daughtry	Rep
27th	Stanley Fox†	Dem	Michael Wray	Dem
28th	New Seat		James Langdon Jr.	Rep
29th	Paul Miller	Dem	Paul Miller	Dem
30th	Paul Luebke	Dem	Paul Luebke	Dem
31st	Mickey Michaux	Dem	Mickey Michaux	Dem
32nd	Jim Crawford	Dem	Jim Crawford	Dem
33rd	Bernard Allen	Dem	Bernard Allen	Dem
34th	Don Munford	Rep	Grier Martin	Dem
35th	Jennifer Weiss	Dem	Jennifer Weiss	Dem
36th	David Miner	Rep	Nelson Dollar	Rep
37th	Paul Stam	Rep	Paul Stam	Rep
38th	Deborah Ross	Dem	Deborah Ross	Dem
39th	Sam Ellis	Rep	Linda Coleman	Dem
40th	Rick Eddins	Rep	Rick Eddins	Rep
41st	Russell Capps (Note: Redistricted from the 50th District.)	Rep	Russell Capps	Rep
42nd	Marvin Lucas	Dem	Marvin Lucas	Dem
43rd	Mary McAllister	Dem	Mary McAllister	Dem
44th	Margaret Dickson (Note: Redistricted from the 41st District.)	Dem	Margaret Dickson	Dem
45th	Rick Glazier (Note: Redistricted from the 44th District.)	Dem	Rick Glazier	Dem
45th	Alex Warner	Dem	Rick Glazier	Dem
46th	Douglas Yongue	Dem	Douglas Yongue	Dem
47th	Ronnie Sutton	Dem	Ronnie Sutton	Dem
48th	Donald Bonner†	Dem	Garland Pierce	Dem
49th	Lucy Allen	Dem	Lucy Allen	Dem
50th	New Seat		Bill Faison	Dem
51st	John Sauls	Rep	John Sauls	Rep
52nd	Richard Morgan	Rep	Richard Morgan	Rep
53rd	David Lewis	Rep	David Lewis	Rep
54th	Joe Hackney	Dem	Joe Hackney	Dem
55th	Gordon Allen†	Dem	Winkie Wilkins	Dem
56th	Verla Insko	Dem	Verla Insko	Dem
57th	Joanne Bowie	Rep	Pricey Harrison	Dem
58th	Alma Adams	Dem	Alma Adams	Dem
59th	Maggie Jeffus	Dem	Maggie Jeffus	Dem
60th	Earl Jones	Dem	Earl Jones	Dem
61st	Steve Wood†	Rep	Laura Wiley	Rep
62nd	John Blust	Rep	John Blust	Rep
63rd	Alice Bordsen	Dem	Alice Bordsen	Dem
64th	Cary Allred	Rep	Cary Allred	Rep
65th	Nelson Cole	Dem	Nelson Cole	Dem
65th	Wayne Sexton (Note: Redistricted from the 66th District.)	Rep	Nelson Cole	Dem
66th	Wayne Goodwin† (Note: Redistricted from the 68th District.)	Dem	Melanie Wade Goodwin	Dem
67th	Bobby Barbee (Note: Redistricted from the 70th District.)	Rep	David Almond	Rep
68th	Curtis Blackwood (Note: Redistricted from the 73rd District.)	Rep	Curtis Blackwood	Rep
69th	Pryor Gibson	Dem	Pryor Gibson	Dem
70th	Arlie Culp (Note: Redistricted from the 67th District.)	Rep	Arlie Culp	Rep
71st	Larry Womble	Dem	Larry Womble	Dem
72nd	Earline Parmon	Dem	Earline Parmon	Dem
73rd	Michael Decker (Note: Redistricted from the 94th District.)	Rep	Larry Brown	Rep
74th	New Seat		Dale Folwell	Rep
75th	Bill McGee (Note: Redistricted from the 93rd District.)	Rep	Bill McGee	Rep
76th	Fred Steen II	Rep	Fred Steen II	Rep
77th	Lorene Coates	Dem	Lorene Coates	Dem
78th	Harold Brubaker	Rep	Harold Brubaker	Rep
79th	Julia Craven Howard	Rep	Julia Craven Howard	Rep
79th	Frank Mitchell (Note: Redistricted from the 96th District.)	Rep	Julia Craven Howard	Rep
80th	Jerry Dockham	Rep	Jerry Dockham	Rep
81st	Hugh Holliman	Dem	Hugh Holliman	Dem
82nd	Jeff Barnhart (Note: Redistricted from the 75th District.)	Rep	Jeff Barnhart	Rep
83rd	Linda Johnson (Note: Redistricted from the 74th District.)	Rep	Linda Johnson	Rep
84th	Phillip Frye	Rep	Phillip Frye	Rep
85th	Mitch Gillespie	Rep	Mitch Gillespie	Rep
86th	Walt Church	Dem	Walt Church	Dem
87th	Edgar Starnes	Rep	Edgar Starnes	Rep
88th	New Seat		Mark Hollo	Rep
89th	Mitchell Setzer	Rep	Mitchell Setzer	Rep
90th	Jim Harrell	Dem	Jim Harrell	Dem
91st	Rex Baker	Rep	Bryan Holloway	Rep
92nd	George Holmes	Rep	George Holmes	Rep
93rd	Gene Wilson (Note: Redistricted from the 82nd District.)	Rep	Gene Wilson	Rep
94th	Tracy Walker (Note: Redistricted from the 83rd District.)	Rep	Tracy Walker	Rep
95th	Karen Ray	Rep	Karen Ray	Rep
96th	Mark Hilton (Note: Redistricted from the 88th District.)	Rep	Mark Hilton	Rep
97th	Joe Kiser	Rep	Joe Kiser	Rep
98th	John Rhodes	Rep	John Rhodes	Rep
99th	Drew Saunders	Dem	Drew Saunders	Dem
100th	Jim Black	Dem	Jim Black	Dem
101st	Beverly Earle	Dem	Beverly Earle	Dem
102nd	Becky Carney	Dem	Becky Carney	Dem
103rd	Jim Gulley	Rep	Jim Gulley	Rep
104th	Ed McMahan (Note: Redistricted from the 105th District.)	Rep	Ed McMahan	Rep
104th	Connie Wilson†	Rep	Ed McMahan	Rep
105th	New Seat		Doug Vinson	Rep
106th	Martha Alexander	Dem	Martha Alexander	Dem
107th	Pete Cunningham	Dem	Pete Cunningham	Dem
108th	John Rayfield	Rep	John Rayfield	Rep
109th	Patrick McHenry†	Rep	William Current	Rep
110th	Debbie Clary	Rep	Debbie Clary	Rep
111th	Tim Moore	Rep	Tim Moore	Rep
112th	Bob England	Dem	Bob England	Dem
113th	Trudi Walend	Rep	Trudi Walend	Rep
114th	Susan Fisher	Dem	Susan Fisher	Dem
115th	Bruce Goforth	Dem	Bruce Goforth	Dem
116th	Wilma Sherrill	Rep	Wilma Sherrill	Rep
117th	Carolyn Justus	Rep	Carolyn Justus	Rep
118th	Ray Rapp	Dem	Ray Rapp	Dem
119th	Phil Haire	Dem	Phil Haire	Dem
120th	Roger West	Rep	Roger West	Rep

† - Incumbent not seeking re-election

Party	Candi- dates	Votes		Seats		
Party	Candi- dates	No.	%	No.	+/–	%
Democratic	84	1,361,804	46.680%	63	▲4	52.5%
Republican	84	1,490,695	51.098%	57	▼4	47.5%
Libertarian	25	46,960	2.187%	0	Steady	0%
Independent	1	990	0.034%	0	Steady	0%
Total	194	2,917,303	100.00%	120	Steady	100.00%

House seats
Democratic	52.5%
Republican	47.5%

Popular vote
Republican	51.098%
Democratic	46.680%
Libertarian	2.187%
Independent	0.034%

=== Incumbents defeated in primary election ===
- Michael Gorman (R-District 3), defeated by Michael Speciale (R)
- Keith Williams (R-District 14), defeated by George Cleveland (R)
- David Miner (R-District 36), defeated by Nelson Dollar (R)
- Alex Warner (D-District 45) lost a redistricting race to Rick Glazier (D-District 44)
- Stephen Wood (R-District 61), defeated by Laura Wiley (R)
- Bobby Barbee Sr. (R-District 70), defeated by David Almond in the renumbered 67th district
- Rex Baker (R-District 91), defeated by Bryan Holloway (R)
- Michael Decker (R-District 94), defeated by Larry Brown (R) in the renumbered 73rd district
- Frank Mitchell (R-District 96) lost a redistricting race to Julia Craven Howard (R-District 79)

=== Incumbents defeated in general election ===
- Don Munford (R-District 34), defeated by Grier Martin (D)
- Sam Ellis (R-District 39), defeated by Linda Coleman (D)
- Joanne Bowie (R-District 57), defeated by Pricey Harrison (D)
- Wayne Sexton (R-District 66) lost a redistricting race to Nelson Cole (D) in the renumbered 65th district.

=== Open seats that changed parties ===
- Michael Gorman (R-District 3) lost re-nomination, seat won by Alice Graham Underhill (D)

=== Newly created seats ===
- District 4, won by Russell Tucker (D)
- District 28, seat won by James Langdon Jr.
- District 50, won by Bill Faison (D)
- District 74, won by Dale Folwell (R)
- District 88, won by Mark Hollo (R)
- District 105, won by Doug Vinson (R)

=== Seats eliminated by redistricting ===
- Charles Elliott Johnson (D-District 4) ran for the State Senate after his district was merged with the 6th district.
- Billy Creech (R-District 26) ran for the U.S House after the 28th district was merged with his district
- Connie Wilson (R-District 104) didn’t seek re-election after the 105th district was merged with her district

== Predictions ==
Source	Ranking	As of
Rothenberg	Tossup	October 1, 2004

== Detailed Results ==
=== Districts 1-19 ===
==== District 1 ====
Incumbent Democrat Bill Owens has represented the 1st District since 1995.

North Carolina House of Representatives 1st district general election, 2004
Party	Candidate	Votes	%
Democratic	Bill Owens (incumbent)	18,873	100%
Total votes		18,873	100%
Democratic hold			

==== District 2 ====
Incumbent Democrat Bill Culpepper has represented the 2nd district and its predecessors since 1993.

North Carolina House of Representatives 2nd district general election, 2004
Party	Candidate	Votes	%
Democratic	Bill Culpepper (incumbent)	16,949	61.51%
Republican	Daniel M. Beall	10,607	38.49%
Total votes		27,556	100%
Democratic hold			

==== District 3 ====
Incumbent Republican Michael Gorman has represented the 3rd district since 2003. Gorman lost re-nomination to fellow Republican Michael Speciale. Former Democratic representative Alice Graham Underhill defeated Speciale in the general election.

North Carolina House of Representatives 3rd district general election, 2004
Party	Candidate	Votes	%
Democratic	Alice Graham Underhill	15,156	51.18%
Republican	Michael Speciale	13,947	47.10%
Libertarian	Herbert M. Sobel	509	1.72%
Total votes		29,612	100%
Democratic gain from Republican			

==== District 4 ====
The new 4th district includes all of Duplin County and a portion of Onslow County. Former Democratic representative Russell Tucker won the open seat.

North Carolina House of Representatives 4th district general election, 2004
Party	Candidate	Votes	%
Democratic	Russell Tucker	15,333	100%
Total votes		15,333	100%
Democratic win (new seat)			

==== District 5 ====
Incumbent Democrat Howard Hunter Jr. has represented the 5th district since 1989.

North Carolina House of Representatives 5th district general election, 2004
Party	Candidate	Votes	%
Democratic	Howard Hunter Jr. (incumbent)	18,006	83.43%
Libertarian	Larry Cooke Jr.	3,576	16.57%
Total votes		21,582	100%
Democratic hold			

==== District 6 ====
The new 6th district includes the homes Incumbent Democrats Arthur Williams, who has represented the 6th district since 2003, and Charles Elliott Johnson, who has represented the 4th district since 2003. Johnson sought the Democratic nomination for the State Senate 3rd district, challenging incumbent Clark Jenkins, but he was defeated by Jenkins. Williams was re-elected here.

North Carolina House of Representatives 6th district general election, 2004
Party	Candidate	Votes	%
Democratic	Arthur Williams (incumbent)	16,192	54.96%
Republican	Al Klemm	13,272	45.04%
Total votes		29,464	100%
Democratic hold			

==== District 7 ====
Incumbent Democrat John Hall has represented the 7th district since his appointment on 2000.

North Carolina House of Representatives 7th district general election, 2004
Party	Candidate	Votes	%
Democratic	John Hall (incumbent)	17,714	100%
Total votes		17,714	100%
Democratic hold			

==== District 8 ====
Incumbent Democrat Edith Warren has represented the 8th district and its predecessors since 1999.

North Carolina House of Representatives 8th district general election, 2004
Party	Candidate	Votes	%
Democratic	Edith Warren (incumbent)	17,033	74.04%
Republican	Curt Hendrix	5,973	25.96%
Total votes		23,006	100%
Democratic hold			

==== District 9 ====
Incumbent Democrat Marian McLawhorn has represented the 9th district since 1999.

North Carolina House of representatives 9th district general election, 2004
Party	Candidate	Votes	%
Democratic	Marian McLawhorn (incumbent)	18,775	100%
Total votes		18,775	100%
Democratic hold			

==== District 10 ====
Incumbent Republican Stephen LaRoque has represented the 10th district since 2003.

North Carolina House of Representatives 10th district general election, 2004
Party	Candidate	Votes	%
Republican	Stephen LaRoque (incumbent)	14,529	57.38%
Democratic	James D. (Lew) Llewellyn	10,793	42.62%
Total votes		25,322	100%
Republican hold			

==== District 11 ====
Incumbent Republican Louis Pate has represented the 11th district since 2003.

North Carolina House of Representatives 11th district general election, 2004
Party	Candidate	Votes	%
Republican	Louis Pate (incumbent)	20,120	100%
Total votes		20,120	100%
Republican hold			

==== District 12 ====
Incumbent Democrat William Wainwright has represented the 12th district and its predecessors since 1991.

North Carolina House of Representatives 12th district general election, 2004
Party	Candidate	Votes	%
Democratic	William Wainwright (incumbent)	13,573	64.49%
Republican	John Percy Wetherington, Jr.	7,473	35.51%
Total votes		21,046	100%
Democratic hold			

==== District 13 ====
Incumbent Republican Jean Preston has represented the 13th district and its predecessors since 1993.

North Carolina House of Representatives 13th district general election, 2004
Party	Candidate	Votes	%
Republican	Jean Preston (incumbent)	20,607	70.77%
Democratic	Malcolm Fulcher	8,513	29.23%
Total votes		29,120	100%
Republican hold			

==== District 14 ====
Incumbent Republican Keith Williams has represented the 14th district since 2005. Williams lost re-nomination to fellow Republican George Cleveland. Cleveland won the general election.

North Carolina House of Representatives 14th district general election, 2004
Party	Candidate	Votes	%
Republican	George Cleveland	11,479	60.78%
Democratic	Kever M. Clark	7,406	39.22%
Total votes		18,885	100%
Republican hold			

==== District 15 ====
Incumbent Republican Robert Grady has represented the 15th district and its predecessors since 1987.

North Carolina House of Representatives 15th district general election, 2004
Party	Candidate	Votes	%
Republican	Robert Grady (incumbent)	9,196	100%
Total votes		9,196	100%
Republican hold			

==== District 16 ====
Incumbent Republican Carolyn Justice has represented the 16th district since 2003.

North Carolina House of Representatives 16th district general election, 2004
Party	Candidate	Votes	%
Republican	Carolyn Justice (incumbent)	25,427	100%
Total votes		25,427	100%
Republican hold			

==== District 17 ====
Incumbent Republican Bonner Stiller has represented the 17th district since 2003.

North Carolina House of representatives 17th district general election, 2004
Party	Candidate	Votes	%
Republican	Bonner Stiller (incumbent)	16,745	49.86%
Democratic	David Redwine	16,288	48.50%
Libertarian	Edward Gore	550	1.64%
Total votes		33,583	100%
Republican hold			

==== District 18 ====
Incumbent Democrat Thomas Wright has represented the 18th district and its predecessors since 1993.

North Carolina House of Representatives 18th district general election, 2004
Party	Candidate	Votes	%
Democratic	Thomas Wright (incumbent)	14,712	63.80%
Republican	Frankie Roberts	8,347	36.20%
Total votes		23,059	100%
Democratic hold			

==== District 19 ====
Incumbent Republican Danny McComas has represented the 19th district and its predecessors since 1995.

North Carolina House of Representatives 19th district general election, 2004
Party	Candidate	Votes	%
Republican	Danny McComas (incumbent)	27,954	100%
Total votes		27,954	100%
Republican hold			

=== Districts 20-39 ===
==== District 20 ====
Incumbent Democrat Dewey Hill has represented the 20th district and its predecessors since 1993.

North Carolina House of Representatives 20th district general election, 2004
Party	Candidate	Votes	%
Democratic	Dewey Hill (incumbent)	19,158	100%
Total votes		19,158	100%
Democratic hold			

==== District 21 ====
Incumbent Democrat Larry Bell has represented the 21st district and its predecessors since 2001.

North Carolina House of Representatives 21st district general election, 2004
Party	Candidate	Votes	%
Democratic	Larry Bell (incumbent)	17,812	100%
Total votes		17,812	100%
Democratic hold			

==== District 22 ====
Incumbent Democrat Edd Nye has represented the 22nd district and its predecessors since 1985.

North Carolina House of Representatives 22nd district general election, 2004
Party	Candidate	Votes	%
Democratic	Edd Nye (incumbent)	18,646	100%
Total votes		18,646	100%
Democratic hold			

==== District 23 ====
Incumbent Democrat Joe Tolson has represented the 23rd district and its predecessors since 1997.

North Carolina House of Representatives 23rd district general election, 2004
Party	Candidate	Votes	%
Democratic	Joe Tolson (incumbent)	17,040	65.93%
Republican	Henry Williams II	8,804	34.07%
Total votes		25,844	100%
Democratic hold			

==== District 24 ====
Incumbent Democrat Jean Farmer-Butterfield has represented the 24th district since 2003.

North Carolina House of Representatives 24th district general election, 2004
Party	Candidate	Votes	%
Democratic	Jean Farmer-Butterfield (incumbent)	19,501	100%
Total votes		19,501	100%
Democratic hold			

==== District 25 ====
Incumbent Republican Bill Daughtridge has represented the 25th district since 2003.

North Carolina House of Representatives 25th district general election, 2004
Party	Candidate	Votes	%
Republican	Bill Daughtridge (incumbent)	20,092	100%
Total votes		20,092	100%
Republican hold			

==== District 26 ====
The new 26th district includes the homes Incumbent Republicans Billy Creech, who has represented the 26th district and its predecessors since 1989, and Leo Daughtry, who has represented the 28th district and its predecessors since 1993. Creech ran for the U.S House and Daughtry was re-elected here.

North Carolina House of Representatives 26th district general election, 2004
Party	Candidate	Votes	%
Republican	Leo Daughtry (incumbent)	20,320	100%
Total votes		20,320	100%
Republican hold			

==== District 27 ====
Incumbent Democrat Stanley Fox has represented the 27th district and its predecessors since 1995. Fox didn’t seek re-election and fellow Democrat Michael Wray won the open seat.

North Carolina House of Representatives 27th district general election, 2004
Party	Candidate	Votes	%
Democratic	Michael Wray	21,237	100%
Total votes		21,237	100%
Democratic hold			

==== District 28 ====
The new 28th district continues to be based in Johnston County and continues to favor Republicans. Republican James Langdon Jr. won the open seat.

North Carolina House of Representatives 28th district general election, 2004
Party	Candidate	Votes	%
Republican	James Langdon Jr.	23,805	100%
Total votes		23,805	100%
Republican win (new seat)			

==== District 29 ====
Incumbent Democrat Paul Miller has represented the 29th district and its predecessors since 2001.

North Carolina House of Representatives 29th district general election, 2004
Party	Candidate	Votes	%
Democratic	Paul Miller (incumbent)	27,249	100%
Total votes		27,249	100%
Democratic hold			

==== District 30 ====
Incumbent Democrat Paul Luebke has represented the 30th district and its predecessors since 1991.

North Carolina House of Representatives 30th district general election, 2004
Party	Candidate	Votes	%
Democratic	Paul Luebke (incumbent)	21,245	88.10%
Libertarian	Sean Haugh	2,870	11.90%
Total votes		24,115	100%
Democratic hold			

==== District 31 ====
Incumbent Democrat Mickey Michaux has represented the 31st district and its predecessors since 1985.

North Carolina House of Representatives 31st district general election, 2004
Party	Candidate	Votes	%
Democratic	Mickey Michaux (incumbent)	23,313	85.98%
Libertarian	Michael P. Owen	3,802	14.02%
Total votes		27,115	100%
Democratic hold			

==== District 32 ====
Incumbent Democrat Jim Crawford has represented the 32nd district and its predecessors since 1995.

North Carolina House of Representatives 32nd district general election, 2004
Party	Candidate	Votes	%
Democratic	Jim Crawford (incumbent)	18,851	88.27%
Libertarian	Tom Howe	2,505	11.73%
Total votes		21,356	100%
Democratic hold			

==== District 33 ====
Incumbent Democrat Bernard Allen has represented the 33rd district since 2003.

North Carolina House of Representatives 33rd district general election, 2004
Party	Candidate	Votes	%
Democratic	Bernard Allen (incumbent)	24,580	92.21%
Libertarian	Steven Hilton	2,076	7.79%
Total votes		26,656	100%
Democratic hold			

==== District 34 ====
Incumbent Republican Don Munford has represented the 34th district since 2003. Munford lost re-election to Democrat Grier Martin.

North Carolina House of Representatives 34th district general election, 2004
Party	Candidate	Votes	%
Democratic	Grier Martin	18,755	51.09%
Republican	Don Munford (incumbent)	17,952	48.91%
Total votes		36,707	100%
Democratic gain from Republican			

==== District 35 ====
Incumbent Democrat Jennifer Weiss has represented the 35th district and its predecessors since 1999.

North Carolina House of Representatives 35th district general election, 2004
Party	Candidate	Votes	%
Democratic	Jennifer Weiss (incumbent)	22,899	88.86%
Libertarian	Graham Yarko Thomas	2,870	11.14%
Total votes		25,769	100%
Democratic hold			

==== District 36 ====
Incumbent Republican David Miner has represented the 36th district since 1993. Miner lost re-nomination to fellow Republican Nelson Dollar. Dollar won the general election.

North Carolina House of Representatives 36th district general election, 2004
Party	Candidate	Votes	%
Republican	Nelson Dollar	24,166	82.72%
Libertarian	Gary Goodson	5,049	17.28%
Total votes		29,215	100%
Republican hold			

==== District 37 ====
Incumbent Republican Paul Stam has represented the 37th district since 2003.

North Carolina House of Representatives 37th district general election, 2004
Party	Candidate	Votes	%
Republican	Paul Stam (incumbent)	29,596	85.39%
Libertarian	H. Wade Minter	5,064	14.61%
Total votes		34,660	100%
Republican hold			

==== District 38 ====
Incumbent Democrat Deborah Ross has represented the 38th district since 2003.

North Carolina House of Representatives 38th district general election, 2004
Party	Candidate	Votes	%
Democratic	Deborah Ross (incumbent)	20,121	66.51%
Republican	Phil Jeffreys	10,131	33.49%
Total votes		30,252	100%
Democratic hold			

==== District 39 ====
Incumbent Republican Sam Ellis has represented the 39th district and its predecessors since 1993. Ellis lost re-election to Democrat Linda Coleman.

North Carolina House of Representatives 39th district general election, 2004
Party	Candidate	Votes	%
Democratic	Linda Coleman	18,480	54.40%
Republican	Sam Ellis (incumbent)	15,488	45.60%
Total votes		33,968	100%
Democratic gain from Republican			

=== Districts 40-59 ===
==== District 40 ====
Incumbent Republican Rick Eddins has represented the 40th district and its predecessors since 1995.

North Carolina House of Representatives 40th district general election, 2004
Party	Candidate	Votes	%
Republican	Rick Eddins (incumbent)	29,528	62.14%
Democratic	Joe O’Shaughnessy	16,848	35.46%
Libertarian	Andrew Hatchell	1,143	2.41%
Total votes		47,519	100%
Republican hold			

==== District 41 ====
The new 41st district overlaps with much of the former 50th district. Incumbent Republican Russell Capps, who has represented the 50th district and its predecessors since 1995, was re-elected here.

North Carolina House of Representatives 41st district general election, 2004
Party	Candidate	Votes	%
Republican	Russell Capps (incumbent)	27,743	100%
Total votes		27,743	100%
Republican hold			

==== District 42 ====
Incumbent Democrat Marvin Lucas has represented the 42nd district and its predecessors since 2001.

North Carolina House of Representatives 42nd district general election, 2004
Party	Candidate	Votes	%
Democratic	Marvin Lucas (incumbent)	10,746	66.24%
Republican	Bob White	5,476	33.76%
Total votes		16,222	100%
Democratic hold			

==== District 43 ====
Incumbent Democrat Mary McAllister has represented the 43rd district and its predecessors since 1991.

North Carolina House of Representatives 43rd district general election, 2004
Party	Candidate	Votes	%
Democratic	Mary McAllister (incumbent)	11,875	100%
Total votes		11,875	100%
Democratic hold			

==== District 44 ====
The new 44th district overlaps with much of the former 41st district. Incumbent Democrat Margaret Dickson, who has represented the 41st district since 2003, was re-elected here.

North Carolina House of Representatives 44th district general election, 2004
Party	Candidate	Votes	%
Democratic	Margaret Dickson (incumbent)	13,764	58.38%
Republican	Ralph Reagan	9,812	41.62%
Total votes		23,576	100%
Democratic hold			

==== District 45 ====
The new 45th district includes the homes of Incumbent Democrats Alex Warner, who has represented the 45th district and its predecessors since 1987, and Rick Glazier, who has represented the 44th district since 2003. Glazier defeated Warner in the Democratic primary and won the general election.

North Carolina House of Representatives 45th district general election, 2004
Party	Candidate	Votes	%
Democratic	Rick Glazier (incumbent)	15,100	60.16%
Republican	Robert T. Lawrence	10,001	39.84%
Total votes		25,101	100%
Democratic hold			

==== District 46 ====
Incumbent Democrat Douglas Yongue has represented the 46th district and its predecessors since 1994.

North Carolina House of Representatives 46th district general election, 2004
Party	Candidate	Votes	%
Democratic	Douglas Yongue (incumbent)	12,913	100%
Total votes		12,913	100%
Democratic hold			

==== District 47 ====
Incumbent Democrat Ronnie Sutton has represented the 47th district since 1995.

North Carolina House of Representatives 47th district general election, 2004
Party	Candidate	Votes	%
Democratic	Ronnie Sutton (incumbent)	15,224	100%
Total votes		15,224	100%
Democratic hold			

==== District 48 ====
Incumbent Democrat Donald Bonner has represented the 48th district and its predecessors since 1997. Bonner didn’t seek re-election and fellow Democrat Garland Pierce won the open seat.

North Carolina House of Representatives 48th district general election, 2004
Party	Candidate	Votes	%
Democratic	Garland Pierce	15,924	100%
Total votes		15,924	100%
Democratic hold			

==== District 49 ====
Incumbent Democrat Lucy Allen has represented the 49th district since 2003.

North Carolina House of Representatives 49th district general election, 2004
Party	Candidate	Votes	%
Democratic	Lucy Allen (incumbent)	15,121	56.66%
Republican	Renee’ McCormick	11,567	43.34%
Total votes		26,688	100%
Democratic hold			

==== District 50 ====
The new 50th district includes all of Caswell County and part of Orange County. Democrat Bill Faison won the open seat.

North Carolina House of Representatives 50th district general election, 2004
Party	Candidate	Votes	%
Democratic	Bill Faison	21,614	100%
Total votes		21,614	100%
Democratic win (new seat)			

==== District 51 ====
Incumbent Republican John Sauls has represented the 51st district since 2003.

North Carolina House of Representatives 51st district general election, 2004
Party	Candidate	Votes	%
Republican	John Sauls (incumbent)	13,255	50.74%
Democratic	Leslie Cox	12,869	49.26%
Total votes		26,124	100%
Republican hold			

==== District 52 ====
Incumbent Republican and Co-Speaker of the House Richard Morgan has represented the 52nd district and its predecessors since 1991.

North Carolina House of Representatives 52nd district general election, 2004
Party	Candidate	Votes	%
Republican	Richard Morgan (incumbent)	23,868	100%
Total votes		23,868	100%
Republican hold			

==== District 53 ====
Incumbent Republican David Lewis has represented the 53rd district since 2003.

North Carolina House of Representatives 53rd district general election, 2004
Party	Candidate	Votes	%
Republican	David Lewis (incumbent)	14,633	58.89%
Democratic	Louise Taylor	10,217	41.11%
Total votes		24,850	100%
Republican hold			

==== District 54 ====
Incumbent Democrat and Majority Leader Joe Hackney has represented the 54th district and its predecessors since 1981.

North Carolina House of Representatives 54th district general election, 2004
Party	Candidate	Votes	%
Democratic	Joe Hackney (incumbent)	24,939	100%
Total votes		24,939	100%
Democratic hold			

==== District 55 ====
Incumbent Democrat Gordon Allen has represented the 55th district and its predecessors since 1997. Allen didn’t seek re-election and Democrat Winkie Wilkins won the open seat.

North Carolina House of Representatives 55th district general election, 2004
Party	Candidate	Votes	%
Democratic	Winkie Wilkins	22,524	88.91%
Libertarian	Tom Rose	2,810	11.09%
Total votes		25,334	100%
Democratic hold			

==== District 56 ====
Incumbent Democrat Verla Insko has represented the 56th district and its predecessors since 1997.

North Carolina House of Representatives 56th district general election, 2004
Party	Candidate	Votes	%
Democratic	Verla Insko (incumbent)	25,984	100%
Total votes		25,984	100%
Democratic hold			

==== District 57 ====
Incumbent Republican Joanne Bowie has represented the 57th district and its predecessors since 1989. Bowie lost re-election to Democrat Pricey Harrison.

North Carolina House of Representatives 57th district general election, 2004
Party	Candidate	Votes	%
Democratic	Pricey Harrison	16,606	56.65%
Republican	Joanne Bowie (incumbent)	12,707	43.35%
Total votes		29,313	100%
Democratic gain from Republican			

==== District 58 ====
Incumbent Democrat Alma Adams has represented the 58th district and its predecessors since 1994.

North Carolina House of Representatives 58th district general election, 2004
Party	Candidate	Votes	%
Democratic	Alma Adams (incumbent)	21,087	65.73%
Republican	Olga Morgan Wright	10,374	32.34%
Libertarian	Walter J. Sperko	618	1.93%
Total votes		32,079	100%
Democratic hold			

==== District 59 ====
Incumbent Democrat Maggie Jeffus has represented the 59th district since 1991.

North Carolina House of Representatives 58th district general election, 2004
Party	Candidate	Votes	%
Democratic	Maggie Jeffus (incumbent)	18,327	57.33%
Republican	Jim Rumley	12,884	40.30%
Libertarian	Allison N. Jaynes	759	2.37%
Total votes		31,970	100%
Democratic hold			

=== Districts 60-79 ===
==== District 60 ====
Incumbent Democrat Earl Jones has represented the 60th district since 2003.

North Carolina House of Representatives 58th district general election, 2004
Party	Candidate	Votes	%
Democratic	Earl Jones (incumbent)	18,270	100%
Total votes		18,270	100%
Democratic hold			

==== District 61 ====
Incumbent Republican Stephen Wood has represented the 61st District since 2003. Wood lost re-nomination to fellow Republican Republican Laura Wiley. Wiley won the general election unopposed.

North Carolina House of Representatives 61st district general election, 2004
Party	Candidate	Votes	%
Republican	Laura Wiley	25,490	100%
Total votes		25,490	100%
Republican hold			

==== District 62 ====
Incumbent Republican John Blust has represented the 62nd District and its predecessors since 2001.

North Carolina House of Representatives 62nd district general election, 2004
Party	Candidate	Votes	%
Republican	John Blust (incumbent)	31,436	100%
Total votes		31,436	100%
Republican hold			

==== District 63 ====
Incumbent Democrat Alice Bordsen has represented the 63rd District since 2003.

North Carolina House of Representatives 63rd district general election, 2004
Party	Candidate	Votes	%
Democratic	Alice Bordsen (incumbent)	12,753	54.89%
Republican	Jerry Rudd	10,482	45.11%
Total votes		23,235	100%
Democratic hold			

==== District 64 ====
Incumbent Republican Cary Allred has represented the 64th District and its predecessors since 1995.

North Carolina House of Representatives 64th district general election, 2004
Party	Candidate	Votes	%
Republican	Cary Allred (incumbent)	22,787	100%
Total votes		22,787	100%
Republican hold			

==== District 65 ====
The new 65th district includes the homes of Incumbent Democrat Nelson Cole, who has represented the 65th District since and its predecessors since 1997, and Incumbent Republican Wayne Sexton, who has represented the 66th district and its predecessors since 1993. Cole defeated Sexton in the general election.

North Carolina House of Representatives 65th district general election, 2004
Party	Candidate	Votes	%
Democratic	Nelson Cole (incumbent)	13,890	52.65%
Republican	Wayne Sexton (incumbent)	12,493	47.35%
Total votes		26,383	100%
Democratic hold			

==== District 66 ====
The new 66th district overlaps with much of the former 68th district. Incumbent Democrat Wayne Goodwin, who has represented the 68th district and its predecessors since 1997, didn’t seek re-election. He instead ran for Labor Commissioner and his wife, Democrat Melanie Wade Goodwin won the open seat.

North Carolina House of Representatives 66th district general election, 2004
Party	Candidate	Votes	%
Democratic	Melanie Wade Goodwin	18,240	94.85%
Independent	Edward J. O’Neal (write-in)	990	5.15%
Total votes		19,230	100%
Democratic hold			

==== District 67 ====
The new 67th district overlaps with much of the former 70th district. Incumbent Republican Bobby Barbee Sr., who has represented the 70th District since 1987, lost re-nomination here to fellow Republican David Almond. Almond won the general election.

North Carolina House of Representatives 67th district general election, 2004
Party	Candidate	Votes	%
Republican	David Almond	19,974	65.91%
Democratic	June Mabry	10,332	34.09%
Total votes		30,306	100%
Republican hold			

==== District 68 ====
The new 68th district overlaps with much of the former 73rd district. Incumbent Republican Curtis Blackwood, who has represented the 73rd District since 2003, was re-elected here.

North Carolina House of Representatives 68th district general election, 2004
Party	Candidate	Votes	%
Republican	Curtis Blackwood (incumbent)	31,252	100%
Total votes		31,252	100%
Republican hold			

==== District 69 ====
Incumbent Democrat Pryor Gibson has represented the 69th district and its predecessors since 1999.

North Carolina House of Representatives 69th district general election, 2004
Party	Candidate	Votes	%
Democratic	Pryor Gibson (incumbent)	14,139	63.44%
Republican	Hilda L. Morton	8,147	36.56%
Total votes		22,286	100%
Democratic hold			

==== District 70 ====
The new 70th district overlaps with much of the former 67th district. Incumbent Republican Arlie Culp, who has represented the 67th District and its predecessors since 1989, was re-elected here.

North Carolina House of Representatives 70th district general election, 2004
Party	Candidate	Votes	%
Republican	Arlie Culp (incumbent)	19,578	91.58%
Libertarian	Douglas Kania	1,801	8.42%
Total votes		21,379	100%
Republican hold			

==== District 71 ====
Incumbent Democrat Larry Womble has represented the 71st District and its predecessors since 1995.

North Carolina House of Representatives 71st district general election, 2004
Party	Candidate	Votes	%
Democratic	Larry Womble (incumbent)	15,840	86.93%
Libertarian	Lynn Haggerty	2,381	13.07%
Total votes		18,221	100%
Democratic hold			

==== District 72 ====
Incumbent Democrat Earline Parmon has represented the 72nd District since 2003.

North Carolina House of Representatives 72nd district general election, 2004
Party	Candidate	Votes	%
Democratic	Earline Parmon (incumbent)	17,286	100%
Total votes		17,286	100%
Democratic hold			

==== District 73 ====
The new 73rd district overlaps with much of the former 94th district. Incumbent Republican Michael Decker(though he had spent much of the last term as a Democrat), who has represented the 94th district and its predecessors since 1985 lost re-nomination here to fellow Republican Larry Brown, who won the general election.

North Carolina House of Representatives 73rd district general election, 2004
Party	Candidate	Votes	%
Republican	Larry Brown	23,966	86.46%
Libertarian	Michael Smith	3,754	13.54%
Total votes		27,720	100%
Republican hold			

==== District 74 ====
The 74th district is based in Forsyth County and it is expected to favor Republicans. Republican Dale Folwell won the open seat.

North Carolina House of Representatives 74th district general election, 2004
Party	Candidate	Votes	%
Republican	Dale Folwell	21,248	62.94%
Democratic	Tom Brandon	12,510	37.06%
Total votes		33,758	100%
Republican win (new seat)			

==== District 75 ====
The new 75th district overlaps with much of the former 93rd district. Incumbent Republican Bill McGee, who has represented the 93rd District since 2003 was re-elected here.

North Carolina House of Representatives 75th district general election, 2004
Party	Candidate	Votes	%
Republican	Bill McGee (incumbent)	24,978	100%
Total votes		24,978	100%
Republican hold			

==== District 76 ====
Incumbent Republican Fred Steen II has represented the 76th District since his appointment in February 2004. Steen was elected to a full term unopposed.

North Carolina House of Representatives 76th district general election, 2004
Party	Candidate	Votes	%
Republican	Fred Steen II (incumbent)	21,610	100%
Total votes		21,610	100%
Republican hold			

==== District 77 ====
Incumbent Democrat Lorene Coates has represented the 77th District since and its predecessors since 2001.

North Carolina House of Representatives 77th district general election, 2004
Party	Candidate	Votes	%
Democratic	Lorene Coates (incumbent)	15,026	60.64%
Republican	Mac Butner	9,751	39.36%
Total votes		24,777	100%
Democratic hold			

==== District 78 ====
Incumbent Republican Harold Brubaker has represented the 78th District and its predecessors since 1977.

North Carolina House of Representatives 78th district general election, 2004
Party	Candidate	Votes	%
Republican	Harold Brubaker (incumbent)	20,756	100%
Total votes		20,756	100%
Republican hold			

==== District 79 ====
The new 79th district includes the homes of Incumbent Republicans Julia Craven Howard, who has represented the 79th District and its predecessors since 1989, and Frank Mitchell, who has represented the 96th district and its predecessors since 1993. Howard defeated Mitchell in the Republican primary and won the general election unopposed.

North Carolina House of Representatives 79th district general election, 2004
Party	Candidate	Votes	%
Republican	Julia Craven Howard (incumbent)	21,225	100%
Total votes		21,225	100%
Republican hold			

=== Districts 80-99 ===
==== District 80 ====
Incumbent Republican Jerry Dockham has represented the 80th district and its predecessors since 1991.

North Carolina House of Representatives 80th district general election, 2004
Party	Candidate	Votes	%
Republican	Jerry Dockham (incumbent)	24,367	100%
Total votes		24,367	100%
Republican hold			

==== District 81 ====
Incumbent Democrat Hugh Holliman has represented the 81st District and its predecessors since 2001.

North Carolina House of Representatives 81st district general election, 2004
Party	Candidate	Votes	%
Democratic	Hugh Holliman (incumbent)	15,141	100%
Total votes		15,141	100%
Democratic hold			

==== District 82 ====
The new 82nd district overlaps with much of the former 75th district. Incumbent Republican Jeff Barnhart, who has represented the 75th district since 2001, was re-elected here.

North Carolina House of Representatives 82nd district general election, 2004
Party	Candidate	Votes	%
Republican	Jeff Barnhart (incumbent)	20,942	85.29%
Libertarian	Carl Miller	3,613	14.71%
Total votes		24,555	100%
Republican hold			

==== District 83 ====
The new 83rd district overlaps with much of the former 74th district. Incumbent Republican Linda Johnson, who has represented the 74th District and its predecessors since 2001, was re-elected here.

North Carolina House of Representatives 83rd district general election, 2004
Party	Candidate	Votes	%
Republican	Linda Johnson (incumbent)	21,648	87.21%
Libertarian	Caroline Gellner	3,176	12.79%
Total votes		24,824	100%
Republican hold			

==== District 84 ====
Incumbent Republican Phillip Frye has represented the 84th district since 2003.

North Carolina House of Representatives 84th district general election, 2004
Party	Candidate	Votes	%
Republican	Phillip Frye (incumbent)	20,718	87.05%
Libertarian	C. Barry Williams	3,082	12.95%
Total votes		23,800	100%
Republican hold			

==== District 85 ====
Incumbent Republican Mitch Gillespie has represented the 85th District since 1999.

North Carolina House of Representatives 85th district general election, 2004
Party	Candidate	Votes	%
Republican	Mitch Gillespie (incumbent)	16,047	66.09%
Democratic	Philip J. Tate	8,234	33.91%
Total votes		24,281	100%
Republican hold			

==== District 86 ====
Incumbent Republican Walt Church has represented the 86th District and its predecessors since 1993.

North Carolina House of Representatives 86th district general election, 2004
Party	Candidate	Votes	%
Democratic	Walt Church (incumbent)	16,029	100%
Total votes		16,029	100%
Democratic hold			

==== District 87 ====
Incumbent Republican Edgar Starnes has represented the 87th District and its predecessors since 1997.

North Carolina House of Representatives 87th district general election, 2004
Party	Candidate	Votes	%
Republican	Edgar Starnes (incumbent)	15,519	59.84%
Democratic	Woody Tucker	10,415	40.16%
Total votes		25,934	100%
Republican hold			

==== District 88 ====
The new 88th district includes all of Alexander County and a portion of Catawba County. Republican Mark Hollo won the open seat.

North Carolina House of Representatives 88th district general election, 2004
Party	Candidate	Votes	%
Republican	Mark Hollo	15,587	56.31%
Democratic	Joel Harbinson	12,096	43.69%
Total votes		27,683	100%
Republican win (new seat)			

==== District 89 ====
Incumbent Republican Mitchell Setzer has represented the 89th District and its predecessors since 1999.

North Carolina House of Representatives 89th district general election, 2004
Party	Candidate	Votes	%
Republican	Mitchell Setzer (incumbent)	20,460	100%
Total votes		20,460	100%
Republican hold			

==== District 90 ====
Incumbent Democrat Jim Harrell has represented the 90th District since 2003.

North Carolina House of Representatives 90th district general election, 2004
Party	Candidate	Votes	%
Democratic	Jim Harrell (incumbent)	13,374	57.97%
Republican	Jack Conaway	9,698	42.03%
Total votes		23,072	100%
Democratic hold			

==== District 91 ====
Incumbent Republican Rex Baker, who has represented the 91st District and its predecessors since 1995, lost re-nomination to fellow Republican Bryan Holloway. Holloway won the general election.

North Carolina House of Representatives 91st district general election, 2004
Party	Candidate	Votes	%
Republican	Bryan Holloway	16,870	57.38%
Democratic	Robert W. Mitchell	12,533	42.62%
Total votes		29,403	100%
Republican hold			

==== District 92 ====
Incumbent Republican George Holmes has represented the 92nd district and its predecessors since 1979.

North Carolina House of Representatives 92nd district general election, 2004
Party	Candidate	Votes	%
Republican	George Holmes (incumbent)	20,830	100%
Total votes		20,830	100%
Republican hold			

==== District 93 ====
The new 93rd district overlaps with much of the former 82nd district. Incumbent Republican Gene Wilson, who has represented the 82nd district and its predecessors since 1995, was re-elected here.

North Carolina House of Representatives 93rd district general election, 2004
Party	Candidate	Votes	%
Republican	Gene Wilson (incumbent)	17,953	51.85%
Democratic	Cullie Tarleton	15,595	45.04%
Libertarian	Brandon Derr	1,078	3.11%
Total votes		34,626	100%
Republican hold			

==== District 94 ====
The new 94th district overlaps with much of the former 83rd district. Incumbent Republican Tracy Walker, who has represented the 83rd District and its predecessors since 2001, was re-elected here.

North Carolina House of Representatives 94th district general election, 2004
Party	Candidate	Votes	%
Republican	Tracy Walker (incumbent)	20,714	100%
Total votes		20,714	100%
Republican hold			

==== District 95 ====
Incumbent Republican Karen Ray has represented the 95th District since 2003.

North Carolina House of Representatives 95th district general election, 2004
Party	Candidate	Votes	%
Republican	Karen Ray (Incumbent)	24,199	100%
Total votes		24,199	100%
Republican hold			

==== District 96 ====
The new 96th district overlaps with much of the former 88th district. Incumbent Republican Mark Hilton, who has represented the 88th District and its predecessors since 2001, was re-elected here.

North Carolina House of Representatives 96th district general election, 2004
Party	Candidate	Votes	%
Republican	Mark Hilton (incumbent)	19,466	100%
Total votes		19,466	100%
Republican hold			

==== District 97 ====
Incumbent Republican and Minority Leader Joe Kiser has represented the 97th District and its predecessors since 1995.

North Carolina House of Representatives 97th district general election, 2004
Party	Candidate	Votes	%
Republican	Joe Kiser (incumbent)	17,888	61.13%
Democratic	Ken H. Fortenberry	11,374	38.87%
Total votes		29,262	100%
Republican hold			

==== District 98 ====
Incumbent Republican John Rhodes has represented the 98th District since 2003.

North Carolina House of Representatives 98th district general election, 2004
Party	Candidate	Votes	%
Republican	John Rhodes (incumbent)	27,830	100%
Total votes		27,830	100%
Republican hold			

==== District 99 ====
Incumbent Democrat Drew Saunders has represented the 99th District and its predecessors since 1997.

North Carolina House of Representatives 99th district general election, 2004
Party	Candidate	Votes	%
Democratic	Drew Saunders (incumbent)	20,081	100%
Total votes		20,081	100%
Democratic hold			

=== Districts 100-120 ===
==== District 100 ====
Incumbent Democrat and Co-Speaker of the House Jim Black has represented the 100th District and its predecessors since 1991.

North Carolina House of Representatives 100th district general election, 2004
Party	Candidate	Votes	%
Democratic	Jim Black (incumbent)	16,160	100%
Total votes		16,160	100%
Democratic hold			

==== District 101 ====
Incumbent Democrat Beverly Earle has represented the 101st District and its predecessors since 1995.

North Carolina House of Representatives 101st district general election, 2004
Party	Candidate	Votes	%
Democratic	Beverly Earle (incumbent)	20,474	100%
Total votes		20,474	100%
Democratic hold			

==== District 102 ====
Incumbent Democrat Becky Carney has represented the 102nd District since 2003.

North Carolina House of Representatives 102nd district general election, 2004
Party	Candidate	Votes	%
Democratic	Becky Carney (incumbent)	17,277	100%
Total votes		17,277	100%
Democratic hold			

==== District 103 ====
Incumbent Republican Jim Gulley has represented the 103rd District and its predecessors since 1997.

North Carolina House of Representatives 103rd district general election, 2004
Party	Candidate	Votes	%
Republican	Jim Gulley (incumbent)	18,195	57.32%
Democratic	Sid Sowers	12,463	39.26%
Libertarian	Stephen Burr	1,087	3.42%
Total votes		31,745	100%
Republican hold			

==== District 104 ====
The new 104th district contains the homes of Incumbent Republicans Connie Wilson, who has represented the 104th district and its predecessors since 1993, and Ed McMahan, who has represented the 105th District and its predecessors since 1995. Wilson didn't seek re-election and McMahan was re-elected here.

North Carolina House of Representatives 104th district general election, 2004
Party	Candidate	Votes	%
Republican	Ed McMahan (incumbent)	26,125	100%
Total votes		26,125	100%
Republican hold			

==== District 105 ====
The new 105th district continues to be based in Mecklenburg County and it is expected to favor Republicans. Republican Doug Vinson won the open seat.

North Carolina House of Representatives 105th district general election, 2004
Party	Candidate	Votes	%
Republican	Doug Vinson	29,368	100%
Total votes		29,368	100%
Republican win (new seat)			

==== District 106 ====
Incumbent Democrat Martha Alexander has represented the 106th district and its predecessors since 1993.

North Carolina House of Representatives 106th district general election, 2004
Party	Candidate	Votes	%
Democratic	Martha Alexander (incumbent)	17,452	100%
Total votes		17,452	100%
Democratic hold			

==== District 107 ====
Incumbent Democrat Pete Cunningham has represented the 107th District and its predecessors since 1987.

North Carolina House of Representatives 107th district general election, 2004
Party	Candidate	Votes	%
Democratic	Pete Cunningham (incumbent)	16,807	68.20%
Republican	Kenny Houck	7,836	31.80%
Total votes		24,643	100%
Democratic hold			

==== District 108 ====
Incumbent Republican John Rayfield has represented the 108th District and its predecessors since 1995.

North Carolina House of Representatives 108th district general election, 2004
Party	Candidate	Votes	%
Republican	John Rayfield (incumbent)	16,505	68.70%
Democratic	William F. Manning, Sr.	7,519	31.30%
Total votes		24,024	100%
Republican hold			

==== District 109 ====
Incumbent Republican Patrick McHenry has represented the 109th District since 2003. McHenry ran for the U.S House and fellow Republican William Current won the open seat.

North Carolina House of Representatives 109th district general election, 2004
Party	Candidate	Votes	%
Republican	William Current	13,629	61.38%
Democratic	Shirley M. Wiggins	8,577	38.62%
Total votes		22,206	100%
Republican hold			

==== District 110 ====
Incumbent Republican Debbie Clary has represented the 110th District and its predecessors since 1995.

North Carolina House of Representatives 110th district general election, 2004
Party	Candidate	Votes	%
Republican	Debbie Clary (incumbent)	14,690	63.49%
Democratic	Jim Long	8,448	36.51%
Total votes		23,138	100%
Republican hold			

==== District 111 ====
Incumbent Republican Tim Moore has represented the 111th District since 2003.

North Carolina House of Representatives 111th district general election, 2004
Party	Candidate	Votes	%
Republican	Tim Moore (incumbent)	14,392	55.45%
Democratic	Kathryn H. Hamrick	11,565	44.55%
Total votes		25,957	100%
Republican hold			

==== District 112 ====
Incumbent Democrat Bob England has represented the 112th District since 2003.

North Carolina House of Representatives 112th district general election, 2004
Party	Candidate	Votes	%
Democratic	Bob England (incumbent)	16,681	61.19%
Republican	Mike Hager	10,171	37.31%
Libertarian	Ralph Haulk	408	1.50%
Total votes		27,260	100%
Democratic hold			

==== District 113 ====
Incumbent Republican Trudi Walend has represented the 113th District and its predecessors since 1999.

North Carolina House of Representatives 113th district general election, 2004
Party	Candidate	Votes	%
Republican	Trudi Walend (incumbent)	24,016	100%
Total votes		24,016	100%
Republican hold			

==== District 114 ====
Incumbent Democrat Susan Fisher has represented the 114th District since her appointment in February 2004. Fisher was elected to a full term.

North Carolina House of Representatives 114th district general election, 2004
Party	Candidate	Votes	%
Democratic	Susan Fisher (incumbent)	19,098	61.95%
Republican	Bill Porter	11,729	38.05%
Total votes		30,827	100%
Democratic hold			

==== District 115 ====
Incumbent Democrat Bruce Goforth has represented the 115th District since 2003.

North Carolina House of Representatives 115th district general election, 2004
Party	Candidate	Votes	%
Democratic	Bruce Goforth (incumbent)	20,957	59.95%
Republican	Barbara Boyd	13,002	37.19%
Libertarian	Robert Parker	999	2.86%
Total votes		34,958	100%
Democratic hold			

==== District 116 ====
Incumbent Republican Wilma Sherrill has represented the 116th district and its predecessors since 1995.

North Carolina House of Representatives 116th district general election, 2004
Party	Candidate	Votes	%
Republican	Wilma Sherrill (incumbent)	20,030	62.25%
Democratic	Doug Jones	12,149	37.75%
Total votes		32,179	100%
Republican hold			

==== District 117 ====
Incumbent Republican Carolyn Justus has represented the 117th District since October 2002.

North Carolina House of Representatives 117th district general election, 2004
Party	Candidate	Votes	%
Republican	Carolyn Justus (incumbent)	21,650	68.17%
Democratic	Wayne Bastedo	10,111	31.83%
Total votes		31,761	100%
Republican hold			

==== District 118 ====
Incumbent Democrat Ray Rapp has represented the 118th District since 2003.

North Carolina House of Representatives 118th district general election, 2004
Party	Candidate	Votes	%
Democratic	Ray Rapp (incumbent)	21,110	100%
Total votes		21,110	100%
Democratic hold			

==== District 119 ====
Incumbent Democrat Phil Haire has represented the 119th District and its predecessors since 1999.

North Carolina House of Representatives 119th district general election, 2004
Party	Candidate	Votes	%
Democratic	Phil Haire (incumbent)	14,147	51.74%
Republican	Margaret Carpenter	13,195	48.26%
Total votes		27,342	100%
Democratic hold			

==== District 120 ====
Incumbent Republican Roger West has represented the 120th District and its predecessors since 2000.

North Carolina House of Representatives 120th district general election, 2004
Party	Candidate	Votes	%
Republican	Roger West (incumbent)	22,375	100%
Total votes		22,375	100%
Republican hold			

== See also ==
- List of North Carolina state legislatures
