= Grier Martin =

American politician from North Carolina

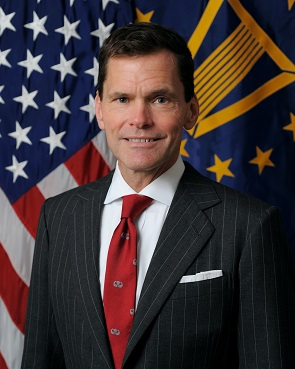
- Martin in 2022

Member of the North Carolina House of Representatives from the 34th district
- In office June 1, 2013 – July 8, 2022
- Preceded by: Deborah Ross
- Succeeded by: Jack Nichols
- In office January 26, 2005 – January 9, 2013
- Preceded by: Don Munford
- Succeeded by: Deborah Ross

Assistant Secretary of Defense for Manpower and Reserve Affairs (acting)
- In office April 1, 2023 – March 13, 2024
- President: Joe Biden
- Preceded by: Thomas A. Constable (acting)
- Succeeded by: Ronald Keohane

Secretary of the North Carolina Department of Military and Veterans Affairs
- In office April 1, 2024 – January 1, 2025
- Governor: Roy Cooper
- Preceded by: Walter E. Gaskin
- Succeeded by: Jocelyn Mitnaul Mallette

Personal details
- Born: David Grier Martin III; October 21, 1968 (age 58) Charlotte, North Carolina, U.S.
- Party: Democratic
- Relations: D. G. Martin (father); David Grier Martin (grandfather)
- Education: Davidson College (BA); University of North Carolina (JD); Judge Advocate General's Legal Center and School (LLM)
- Profession: Attorney

David Grier Martin III (born October 21, 1968) is an American politician and attorney. He served several terms as a Democratic member of the North Carolina General Assembly, representing the state's 34th district.

He resigned in 2023 to serve as Acting Assistant Secretary of Defense for Manpower and Reserve Affairs.

In 2024, Martin was appointed Secretary of the North Carolina Department of Military and Veterans Affairs by Governor Roy Cooper.

== Early life and education ==
Martin graduated from Davidson College and the University of North Carolina School of Law, where he served as a Note Editor of the North Carolina Law Review.

== Career ==
=== Military service ===
Martin is a lieutenant colonel in the United States Army Reserve and served in Afghanistan in 2002 and 2003.

=== Politics ===
Martin was first elected to the North Carolina House of Representatives in 2004, after defeating incumbent Republican Don Munford. Martin defeated Republican J.H. Ross in the November 2006 and 2008 elections, and Republican Steve Henion in 2010. He chose not to run for re-election in 2012 after redistricting placed him in the same district with fellow Democratic Rep. Deborah Ross. But in 2013, Ross resigned from the legislature, and with her endorsement, local Democrats selected Martin to take her place for the remainder of the term.

During his first tenure in the House, Martin at one point co-chaired the Transportation Subcommittee of the Appropriations Committee and chaired the Homeland Security, Military, and Veterans Affairs Committee. He received the Disabled American Veterans of North Carolina "Legislator of the Year" award, the Pesticide Education Project (now Toxic Free NC) "Legislative Leadership" award, the National Guard Association of the United States' Charles Dick Medal of Merit, the Brain Injury of North Carolina's "Our Hero Award," and was named a "Freshman of the Year" by the Conservation Council of North Carolina. In 2010, Martin was named "Defender of the Environment" by the League of Conservation Voters of NC.

National and state Democrats recruited Martin to run for the United States Senate against incumbent Republican Elizabeth Dole in the 2008 election, but he declined in order to spend time with his family. In 2011, Martin was appointed by Secretary of Defense Leon Panetta to serve on the Reserve Forces Policy Board. Martin was named a 2014 Aspen Institute Rodel Fellow.

Martin had been planning to run for re-election in 2022, but his name will be replaced on the general election ballot by another candidate chosen by the Wake County Democratic Party. His last day would be July 8.

== Personal life ==
Martin is married with one daughter.

North Carolina House of Representatives
Preceded by Don Munford	Member of the North Carolina House of Representatives from the 34th district 2005-2013	Succeeded by Deborah Ross
Preceded by Deborah Ross	Member of the North Carolina House of Representatives from the 34th district 2013-2022	Succeeded by Jack Nichols
