= Improve The Dream =

American immigration reform organization

Improve The Dream is a grassroots organization that advocates for approximately 250,000 young people who grew up in the United States as child dependents of non-immigrant visa holders and lack a clear pathway to permanent residency. The organization's vision is to ensure that all children who grow up in the United States have a clear opportunity to become an American citizen, pursue their passions, and contribute to their country. Their stated mission is to help young people and their families navigate the immigration system, while advocating for an end to policies that cause "aging out," a situation where a child of a non-immigrant visa holder's dependent visa expires the day they turn 21, putting them at risk of having to return to their birth country.

== History ==
Improve The Dream was founded by Dip Patel in 2017. Patel was born in India and moved with his family first to Canada, and then to southern Illinois. His parents secured an E-2 visa, but this left him without a clear path to U.S. citizenship once he turned 21. A few years after the group's formation, the over 250,000 children on long-term visa holders who face the threat of aging out became known colloquially as "Documented Dreamers." On April 28, 2021, University of Iowa student and Documented Dreamer Pareen Mhatre testified as a witness on behalf of Improve The Dream before the House Judiciary Committee on a hearing that focused on barriers to Legal immigration. On March 15, 2022, Documented Dreamer Athulya Rajakumar testified as a witness on behalf of Improve The Dream before the Senate Judiciary Committee on a hearing entitled "Removing Barriers to Legal Migration to Strengthen our Communities and Economy."

== Children of long-term visa holders ==
According to a survey conducted by Improve The Dream, the average Documented Dreamer arrives to the United States at the age of 5 and has maintained legal status for 12 years. Though many have lived in the United States for most of their lives, the visas that their parents brought them on expire when they turn 21. This predicament happens in two primary ways. One pertains to the requirement that no more than 7 percent of all available immigrant visas will be issued to residents from any one country. This rule causes Permanent residency applicants from larger countries, like India, to wait decades in line before receiving their Green cards. United States Congress passed a law in 2000 that allows green card applicants already working in the United States to renew their Temporary visa past their initial expiration so they can continue to work until they are next in line for a green card. However, Congress never passed a law that accommodated their children by preventing their dependent visas from expiring. As a result, these Documented Dreamers lose their place in the green card queue when they come of age.

A second way that people become Documented Dreamers is if they were brought to the United States on non-immigrant work visas that discourage the visa holder from adjusting to permanent residency, a prohibition known as "non-immigrant intent." Though many of these visas can be renewed indefinitely, the U.S. government may deny such renewals if the visa holder applies for a green card. This typically results in a situation where the parents on these visas are unable to obtain permanent residency for themselves, and, by extension, their children. Consequently, the child has no clear pathway to permanent residency after their visa expires upon turning 21.

== Legislative efforts ==
On July 1, 2021, Representatives Deborah Ross (politician) and Mariannette Miller-Meeks introduced the America's CHILDREN Act, a Bipartisan bill that Improve The Dream advocated for. The bill was introduced in the Senate in September 2021 by Senators Alex Padilla and Rand Paul. If enacted, the bill would grant a pathway to permanent residency for children who grew up in the United States legally but were blocked from obtaining permanent residency due to green card backlogs and other legal barriers. The bill would also establish age out protections that lock in a child's age on the date their family filed for a green card, rather than the final action date, and provide work authorization for youth whose green card applications are pending if they are 16 years of age or older.
