= Tim Longest =

American politician

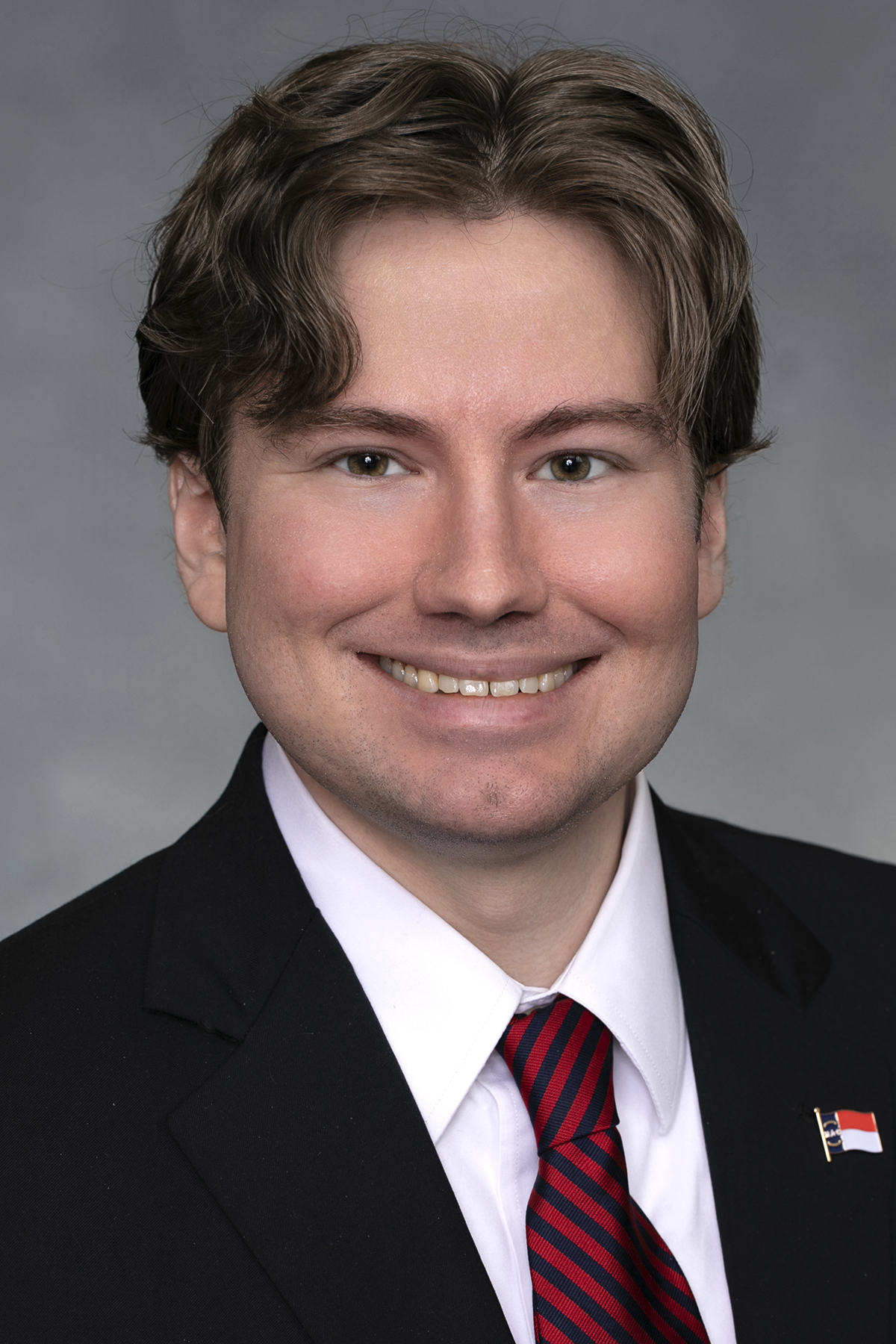

Member of the North Carolina House of Representatives from the 34th district
- Incumbent
- Assumed office January 1, 2023
- Preceded by: Jack Nichols

Personal details
- Born: 1992 (age 33–34) Greenville, North Carolina, U.S.
- Party: Democratic
- Spouse: Landen (m. 2019)
- Education: University of North Carolina, Chapel Hill (BA, JD)
- Occupation: Lawyer

Tim Longest is a Democratic member of the North Carolina House of Representatives for the 34th district.

== Biography ==
Longest graduated from JH Rose High School. He earned his bachelor's degree in 2013 from University of North Carolina at Chapel Hill and his Juris Doctor degree in 2018, from University of North Carolina School of Law. He is a Presbyterian and is a lawyer. He was born in Greenville, North Carolina and raised in Elizabeth City, North Carolina. His father was a public school teacher.

== Committee assignments ==
=== 2023-2024 session ===
- Disaster Recovery and Homeland Security
- Education - Universities
- Finance
- Marine Resources and Aquaculture
- Unemployment Insurance

== Electoral history ==
Longest was elected to his first term for the 34th district on November 8, 2022, in the 2022 North Carolina House of Representatives election against Republican opponent Ashley Seshul and Libertarian opponent Kat McDonald.

North Carolina House of Representatives 34th district general election, 2022
Party	Candidate	Votes	%
Democratic	Tim Longest	24,413	60.27%
Republican	Ashley Seshul	14,853	36.67%
Libertarian	Kat McDonald	1,240	3.06%
Total votes		40,506	100%
Democratic hold			

North Carolina House of Representatives
Preceded by Jack Nichols	Member of the North Carolina House of Representatives from the 34th district 2023-Present	Incumbent
