= Don Munford =

American politician

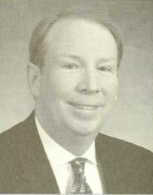
Munford in the 2003 legislative manual

R. Donovan "Don" Munford was a Republican member of the North Carolina General Assembly representing the state's thirty-fourth House district, including constituents in Wake County from 2002. Munford is a lawyer and accountant from Raleigh, North Carolina.

Munford ran for re-election to the North Carolina House of Representatives in the 2004. He defeated J.H. Ross in the Republican primary, but lost to Democrat Grier Martin in the general election.

He is a partner at Smith Anderson, the largest law firm in the Raleigh area. He practices in the areas of corporate and business law, estate planning and asset protection planning. Munford is also a licensed Certified Public Accountant.

North Carolina House of Representatives
Preceded by Fern Shubert	Member of the North Carolina House of Representatives from the 34th district 2003–2005	Succeeded by Grier Martin
