= Jack Nichols (politician) =

American politician from North Carolina

Representative Jack Nichols

Member of the North Carolina House of Representatives from the 34th district
- In office July 15, 2022 – January 1, 2023
- Preceded by: Grier Martin
- Succeeded by: Tim Longest

Personal details
- Born: M. Jackson Nichols Quantico, Virginia, U.S.
- Party: Democratic
- Education: Davidson College (BS); Duke University (MA); Wake Forest University (JD)
- Occupation: Attorney

M. Jackson "Jack" Nichols is an American politician who served as a Democratic member of the North Carolina House of Representatives from 2022 to 2023. An attorney from Raleigh, North Carolina, he represented the 34th district (including constituents in Wake County).

== North Carolina House of Representatives ==
Nichols ran unsuccessfully for the North Carolina House of Representatives in 2000, losing to Republican incumbent Art Pope. Nichols also ran unsuccessfully for the North Carolina Senate in 2004 and 2008. Representative Grier Martin resigned his seat in the NC House on July 8, 2022 to take a job at the pentagon, and local Democrats selected Nichols to serve the balance of Martin's term. Nichols will not be a candidate for the seat in the 2022 election.

== Electoral history ==
=== 2010 ===
Wake County Board of Commissioners 7th district general election, 2010
Party	Candidate	Votes	%
Republican	Paul Coble (incumbent)	141,687	51.99%
Democratic	Jack Nichols	130,841	48.01%
Total votes		272,528	100%
Republican hold			

=== 2008 ===
North Carolina Senate 16th district Democratic primary election, 2008
Party	Candidate	Votes	%
Democratic	Josh Stein	15,715	47.97%
Democratic	Jack Nichols	13,224	40.37%
Democratic	Mike Shea	3,822	11.67%
Total votes		32,761	100%

=== 2004 ===
North Carolina Senate 16th district Democratic primary election, 2004
Party	Candidate	Votes	%
Democratic	Janet Cowell	5,367	49.03%
Democratic	Jack Nichols	2,641	24.13%
Democratic	Carter Worthy	2,136	19.51%
Democratic	Mike Shea	802	7.33%
Total votes		10,946	100%

=== 2000 ===
North Carolina House of Representatives 61st district general election, 2000
Party	Candidate	Votes	%
Republican	Art Pope (incumbent)	14,810	50.98%
Democratic	Jack Nichols	14,243	49.02%
Total votes		29,053	100%
Republican hold			

North Carolina House of Representatives
Preceded by Grier Martin	Member of the North Carolina House of Representatives from the 34th district 2022–2023	Succeeded by Tim Longest
