= Pat Hurley =

American politician

Representative Pat Hurley
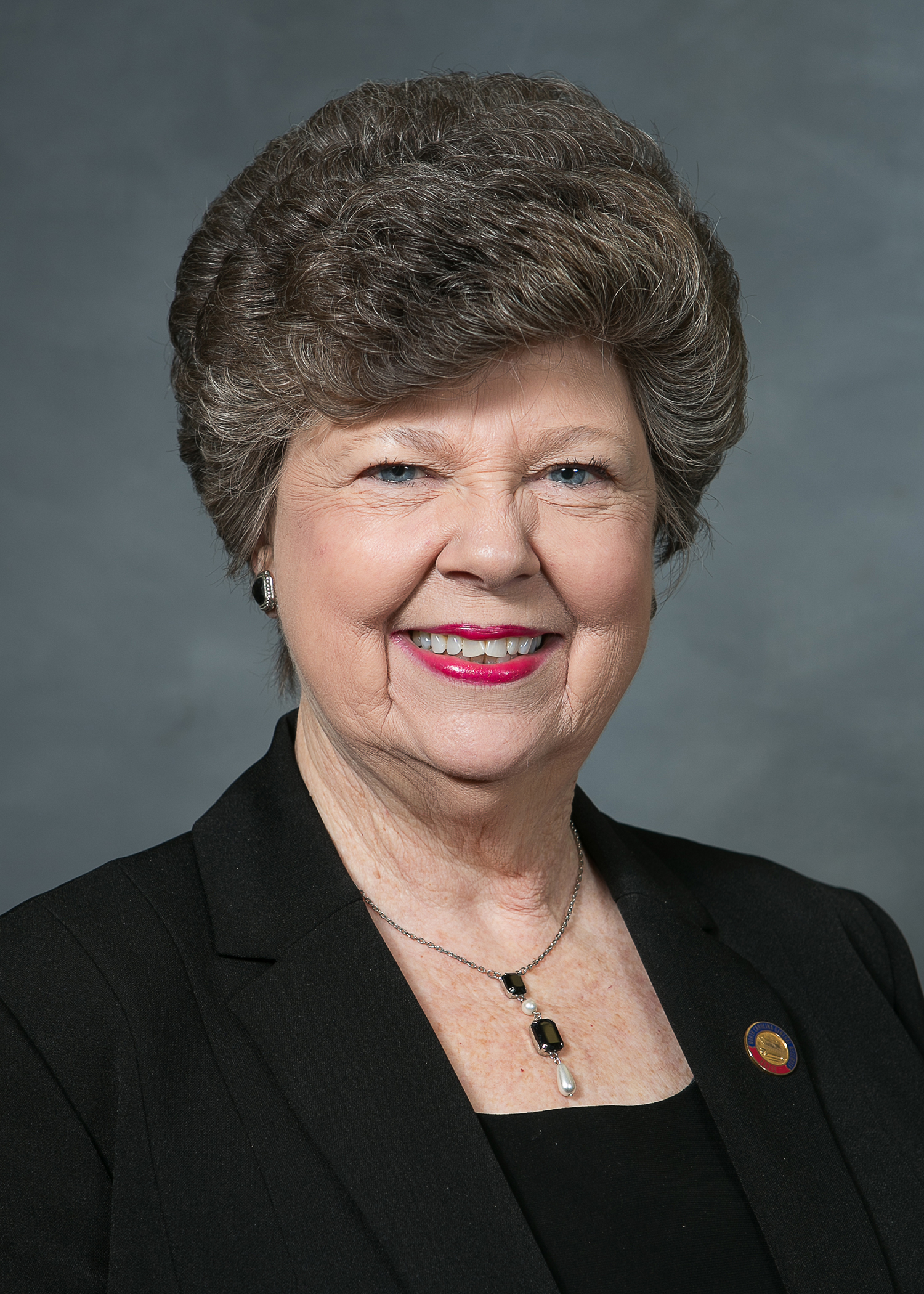

Member of the North Carolina House of Representatives from the 70th district
- In office January 1, 2007 – January 1, 2023
- Preceded by: Arlie Culp
- Succeeded by: Brian Biggs

Personal details
- Born: December 29, 1939 (age 86) Asheboro, North Carolina, U.S.
- Party: Republican
- Children: 2

Patricia Britt "Pat" Hurley (born December 29, 1939) is a former Republican member of the North Carolina House of Representatives She represented the 70th district (including constituents in Randolph County) from 2007 to 2023.

== Committee assignments ==
=== 2021-2022 session ===
- Appropriations (Vice Chair)
- Appropriations - Education (Chair)
- Education - Community Colleges (Chair)
- Families, Children, and Aging Policy (Vice Chair)
- Pensions and Retirement
- Alcoholic Beverage Control

=== 2019-2020 session ===
- Appropriations (Vice Chair)
- Appropriations - Education (Chair)
- Education - Community Colleges (Chair)
- Families, Children, and Aging Policy (Chair)
- Pensions and Retirement (Vice Chair)
- Alcoholic Beverage Control
- Finance

=== 2017-2018 session ===
- Appropriations (Vice Chair)
- Appropriations - Education (Chair)
- Aging (Chair)
- Judiciary II (Vice Chair)
- Pensions and Retirement
- Alcoholic Beverage Control
- Education - K-12
- Health Care Reform
- State Personnel

=== 2015-2016 session ===
- Appropriations (Vice Chair)
- Appropriations on Justice and Public Safety (Chair)
- Aging (Chair)
- Judiciary II (Vice Chair)
- Pensions and Retirement
- Education - K-12
- State Personnel

=== 2013-2014 session ===
- Appropriations (Vice Chair)
- State Personnel (Vice Chair)
- Judiciary
- Agriculture
- Banking
- Health and Human Services

=== 2011-2012 session ===
- Appropriations
- State Personnel (Vice Chair)
- Health and Human Services
- Insurance
- Government

=== 2009-2010 session ===
- Appropriations
- Pensions and Retirement
- Education
- Judiciary II
- Juvenile Justice
- Mental Health Reform

== Electoral history ==
=== 2022 ===
North Carolina House of Representatives 70th district Republican primary election, 2022
Party	Candidate	Votes	%
Republican	Brian Biggs	5,213	52.27%
Republican	Pat Hurley (incumbent)	4,760	47.73%
Total votes		9,973	100%

=== 2020 ===
North Carolina House of Representatives 70th district general election, 2020
Party	Candidate	Votes	%
Republican	Pat Hurley (incumbent)	28,546	75.87%
Democratic	Susan Lee "Susie" Scott	9,080	24.13%
Total votes		37,626	100%
Republican hold			

=== 2018 ===
North Carolina House of Representatives 70th district general election, 2018
Party	Candidate	Votes	%
Republican	Pat Hurley (incumbent)	18,717	76.91%
Democratic	Mary Rulli	5,620	23.09%
Total votes		24,337	100%
Republican hold			

=== 2016 ===
North Carolina House of Representatives 70th district general election, 2016
Party	Candidate	Votes	%
Republican	Pat Hurley (incumbent)	24,856	76.14%
Democratic	Lois Bohnsack	7,789	23.86%
Total votes		32,645	100%
Republican hold			

=== 2014 ===
North Carolina House of Representatives 70th district general election, 2014
Party	Candidate	Votes	%
Republican	Pat Hurley (incumbent)	15,508	100%
Total votes		15,508	100%
Republican hold			

=== 2012 ===
North Carolina House of Representatives 70th district general election, 2012
Party	Candidate	Votes	%
Republican	Pat Hurley (incumbent)	24,642	100%
Total votes		24,642	100%
Republican hold			

=== 2010 ===
North Carolina House of Representatives 70th district Republican primary election, 2010
Party	Candidate	Votes	%
Republican	Pat Hurley (incumbent)	3,252	69.83%
Republican	Fred Burgess	1,405	30.17%
Total votes		4,657	100%

North Carolina House of Representatives 70th district general election, 2010
Party	Candidate	Votes	%
Republican	Pat Hurley (incumbent)	13,564	100%
Total votes		13,564	100%
Republican hold			

=== 2008 ===
North Carolina House of Representatives 70th district general election, 2008
Party	Candidate	Votes	%
Republican	Pat Hurley (incumbent)	19,318	67.35%
Democratic	Bev O’Brien	9,364	32.65%
Total votes		28,682	100%
Republican hold			

=== 2006 ===
North Carolina House of Representatives 70th district Republican primary election, 2006
Party	Candidate	Votes	%
Republican	Pat Hurley	1,326	35.23%
Republican	Jim S. Parker	1,317	34.99%
Republican	Lou Burrow Wilson	1,121	29.78%
Total votes		3,764	100%

North Carolina House of Representatives 70th district Republican primary run-off election, 2006
Party	Candidate	Votes	%
Republican	Pat Hurley	1,129	61.90%
Republican	Jim S. Parker	695	38.10%
Total votes		1,824	100%

North Carolina House of Representatives 70th district general election, 2006
Party	Candidate	Votes	%
Republican	Pat Hurley	8,756	64.77%
Democratic	Hampton "Happy" Spivey	4,762	35.23%
Total votes		13,518	100%
Republican hold			

North Carolina House of Representatives
Preceded by Arlie Culp	Member of the North Carolina House of Representatives from the 70th district 2007–2023	Succeeded by Brian Biggs
