= Brian Biggs (politician) =

American politician

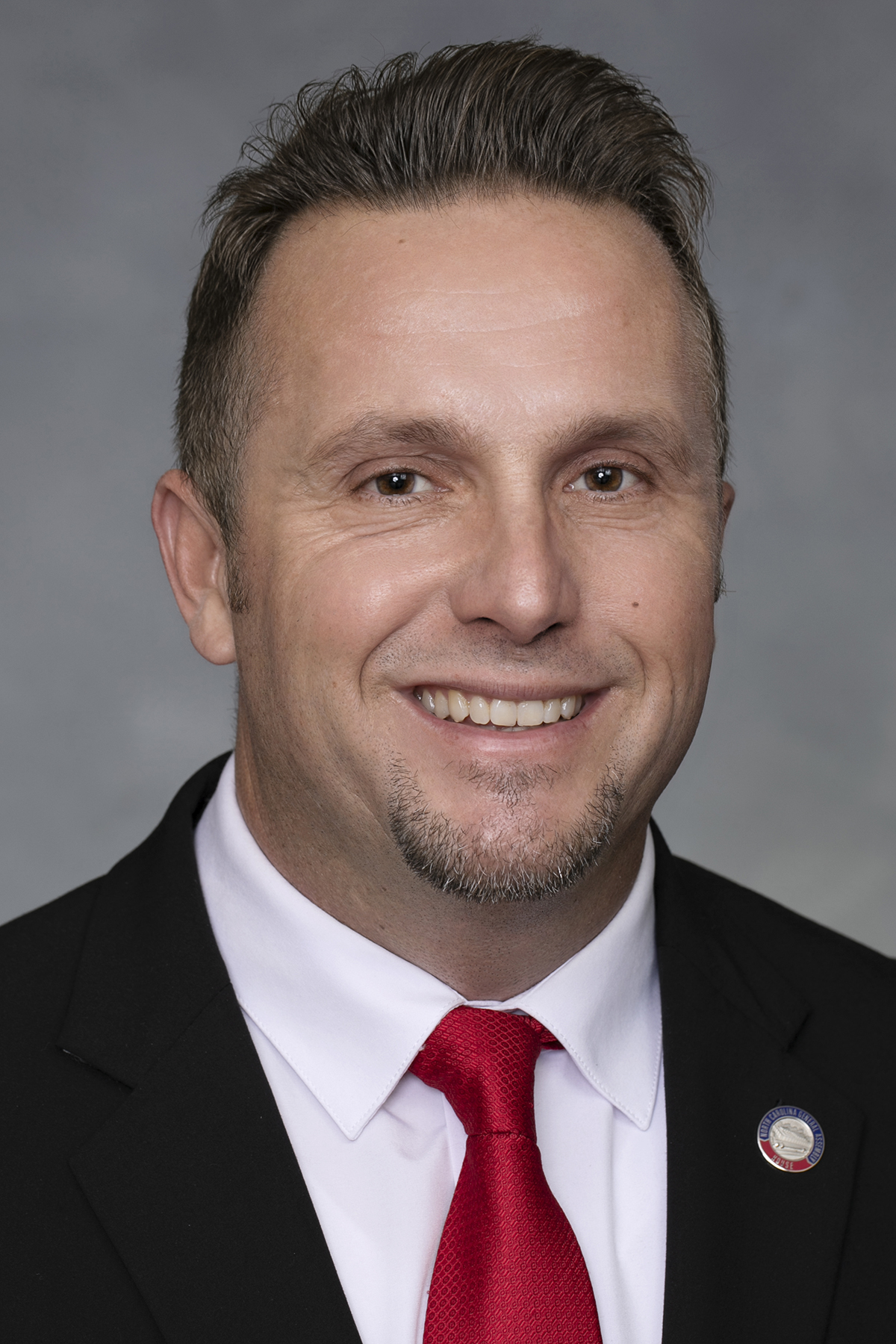

Member of the North Carolina House of Representatives from the 70th district
- Incumbent
- Assumed office January 1, 2023
- Preceded by: Pat Hurley

Personal details
- Born: Brian O'Neal Biggs
- Party: Republican
- Spouse: Heather
- Occupation: Broker
- Website: Official website

Brian O'Neal Biggs is a Republican member of the North Carolina House of Representatives who has represented the 70th district (including parts of Randolph County) since 2023. A former member of the Randolph County Board of Education, he ousted incumbent Pat Hurley in the 2022 primary election.

== Committee assignments ==
=== 2023-2024 session ===
- Appropriations
- Appropriations - Information Technology
- Education K-12
- Election Law and Campaign Finance Reform
- Regulatory Reform
- Transportation

== Electoral history ==
=== 2022 ===
North Carolina House of Representatives 70th district Republican primary election, 2022
Party	Candidate	Votes	%
Republican	Brian Biggs	5,213	52.27%
Republican	Pat Hurley (incumbent)	4,760	47.73%
Total votes		9,973	100%

North Carolina House of Representatives 70th district general election, 2022
Party	Candidate	Votes	%
Republican	Brian Biggs	22,160	79.01%
Democratic	Susan Lee "Susie" Scott	5,887	20.99%
Total votes		28,047	100%
Republican hold			

=== 2018 ===
Randolph County Board of Education general election, 2018
Candidate	Votes	%
Brian Biggs (incumbent)	25,968	33.84%
Fred Burgess Jr. (incumbent)	25,708	33.50%
Todd Cutler	24,339	31.71%
Write-in	588	0.77%
Jarrett Elliott (write-in)	79	0.10%
Gary Cook (write-in)	15	0.02%
Toby Strider (write-in)	9	0.01%
Darren Vaughn (write-in)	7	0.01%
David Moon (write-in)	6	0.01%
Tommy McDonald (write-in)	5	0.01%
Total votes	76,724	100%

=== 2014 ===
Randolph County Board of Education general election, 2014
Candidate	Votes	%
Emily Thomas Coltrane (incumbent)	13,571	21.98%
Brian Biggs	10,773	17.45%
Fred Burgess	7,608	12.32%
Grace Steed	6,339	10.27%
Terry Linthicum	6,323	10.24%
Jennifer Leister	4,006	6.49%
Rodney Chriscoe	3,826	6.20%
John L. Crawford	3,485	5.64%
Robert L. Youngblood	3,058	4.95%
Douglas R. Vickers	2,478	4.01%
Write-in	224	0.36%
Tommy McDonald (incumbent) (write-in)	27	0.04%
Joan Wall (write-in)	21	0.03%
Total votes	61,739	100%

=== 2010 ===
Randolph County Board of Education general election, 2010
Candidate	Votes	%
Gary Mason	13,346	22.70%
Emily Thomas Coltrane	11,492	19.55%
Tommy McDonald	11,106	18.89%
Brian Biggs	9,730	16.55%
Laverne A. Williams	8,638	14.69%
Robert E. "Bob" Cromer	4,266	7.26%
Write-in	212	0.36%
Total votes	58,790	100%

North Carolina House of Representatives
Preceded by Pat Hurley	Member of the North Carolina House of Representatives from the 70th district 2023–Present	Incumbent
