= Jocelyn Mitnaul Mallette =

American politician, lawyer, and military officer

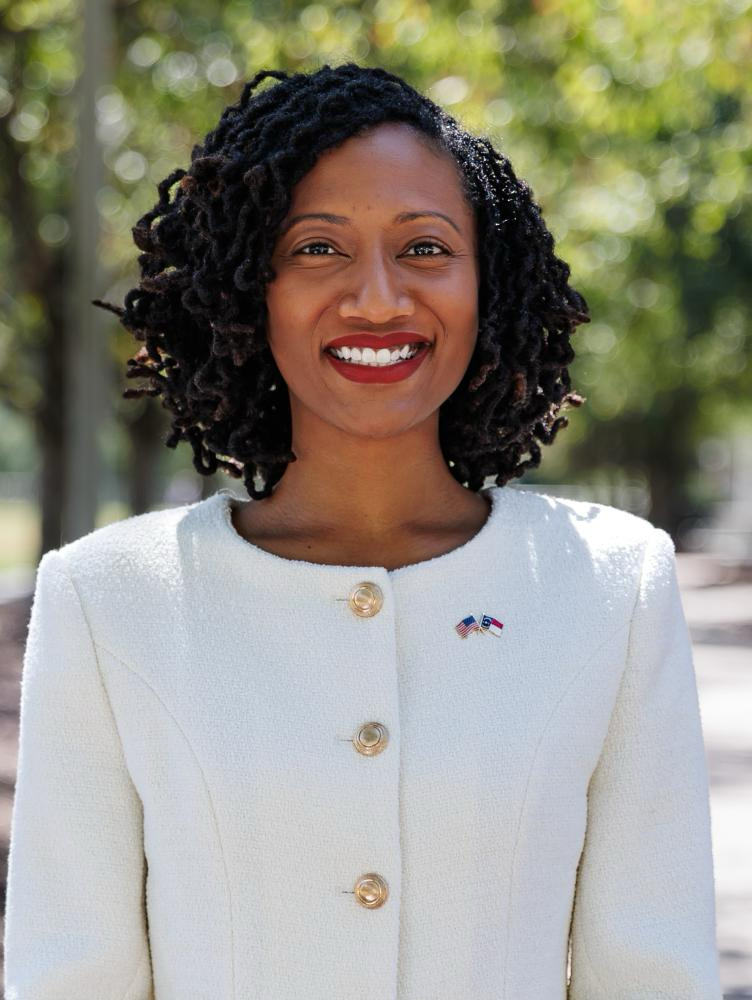
- Mallette in 2025

North Carolina Secretary of Military and Veterans Affairs
- Incumbent
- Assumed office January 1, 2025
- Governor: Josh Stein
- Preceded by: Grier Martin

Personal details
- Spouse: Harold Mallette (m. 2018)
- Children: 2
- Education: United States Air Force Academy (BS); University of North Carolina at Chapel Hill (JD)
- Occupation: lawyer

Military service
- Allegiance: United States
- Branch/service: United States Air Force
- Years of service: 2007–2017
- Rank: Captain
- Battles/wars: War in Afghanistan

Jocelyn Mitnaul Mallette is an American lawyer, politician, and retired military officer. She served in the United States Air Force as an intelligence officer and wing executive officer before becoming an Assistant Staff Judge Advocate at Seymour Johnson Air Force Base. She was appointed to the North Carolina Real Estate Commission by Governor Roy Cooper, serving from 2023 to 2025. In 2025, she was appointed to the North Carolina Cabinet as the Secretary of the North Carolina Department of Military and Veterans Affairs by Governor Josh Stein.

== Early life, family, and education ==
Mallette is the daughter of Colonel Henry Mitnaul, an officer in the United States Air Force, and Teresa Mitnaul. She has a brother, Major Justin Mitnaul, who served as a pilot in the Air Force, and a sister. She comes from a military family with 153 years of service in the United States Armed Forces. Along with her father and brother, Mallette's grandfather, uncles, and aunt all served in the military. Her grandfather, Woodrow Mitnaul, retired as a first sergeant in the United States Army. Nine of her relatives are veterans of the Air Force, Army, and Marines.

She is of African-American and Japanese descent.

As a child, Mallette lived in Germany, where her father was stationed. She also lived in Kansas, Virginia, Nebraska, Alabama, and Colorado. She attended the United States Air Force Academy, having been nominated by Congresswoman Eva Clayton. She graduated with a legal studies degree from the academy and went on to earn a juris doctor from the University of North Carolina School of Law, where she was inducted into the James E. and Carolyn B. Davis Society.

== Career ==
Mallette served in the Air Force for ten years, until she retired due to a sleep disorder diagnosis. She receives treatments through the Veterans Affairs hospital. During her time in the military, she trained as an intelligence officer, briefed pilots for missions in the Middle East, and was a recipient of the General Michael Hayden Award in 2009. She was also an admissions advisor with the United States Air Force Academy and a wing executive officer. As an intelligence officer with the Air Force, she accompanied pilots on a mission during the War in Afghanistan.

She went back to school to become lawyer and cross-trained as an assistant Judge Advocate General. She served as a prosecutor and as a general practice attorney at Seymour Johnson Air Force Base in Goldsboro. Prior to that, she interned at Peterson Air Force Base in Colorado and Shaw Air Force Base in South Carolina. Upon being diagnosed with narcolepsy and small fiber neuropathy, she had to retire from the armed forces.

After retiring, she then went on to work as a law clerk for Associate Justice Barbara Jackson at the North Carolina Supreme Court and then in private practice as a senior associate and later as a partner at McGuireWoods law firm in Raleigh. She did pro bono work representing veterans with the National Veterans Legal Services Program. In 2022, she received the North Carolina Bar Association's Citizen Lawyer Award.

She and her husband cofounded MLT LLC, a contracting business based in Raleigh.

In March 2023, Mallette was appointed to the North Carolina Real Estate Commission by Governor Roy Cooper.

She was appointed by Governor Josh Stein to serve in the North Carolina Cabinet as the Secretary for the North Carolina Department of Military and Veterans Affairs. As secretary, she made official visits to Seymour Johnson Air Force Base and Fort Bragg.

== Personal life ==
In 2018, she married Harold Mallette, an architect. They have two children.

She is fluent in Arabic.

Mallette serves on the Advisory Board of the Southeast Raleigh YMCA and is a member of Alpha Kappa Alpha sorority and the Junior League.
