= North Carolina's 70th House district =

American legislative district

North Carolina's 70th State House of Representatives district
Representative
| Brian Biggs; R–Trinity |
- Demographics: 72% White; 7% Black; 15% Hispanic; 2% Asian; 3% Multiracial
- Population (2024): 88,696

North Carolina's 70th House district is one of 120 districts in the North Carolina House of Representatives. It has been represented by Republican Brian Biggs since 2023.

== Geography ==
Since 2005, the district has included part of Randolph County. The district overlaps with the 29th Senate district.

== District officeholders ==
| Representative | Party | Dates | Notes | Counties |
|---|---|---|---|---|
District created January 1, 1985.
| Toby Fitch (Wilson) | Democratic | January 1, 1985 – December 29, 2001 | Resigned. | 1985–2003; Parts of Wilson, Edgecombe, and Nash counties. |
| Vacant | | December 29, 2001 – January 28, 2002 | | 1985–2003; Parts of Wilson, Edgecombe, and Nash counties. |
| Shelly Willingham (Rocky Mount) | Democratic | January 28, 2002 – January 1, 2003 | Appointed to finish Fitch's term. Redistricted to the 24th district and lost re-nomination. | 1985–2003; Parts of Wilson, Edgecombe, and Nash counties. |
| Bobby Barbee Sr. (Locust) | Republican | January 1, 2003 – January 1, 2005 | Redistricted from the 82nd district. Redistricted to the 67th district and lost re-nomination. | 2003–2005; Parts of Stanly and Union counties. |
| Arlie Culp (Ramseur) | Republican | January 1, 2005 – January 1, 2007 | Redistricted from the 67th district. Retired. | 2005–Present; Part of Randolph County. |
| Pat Hurley (Asheboro) | Republican | January 1, 2007 – January 1, 2023 | Lost re-nomination. | 2005–Present; Part of Randolph County. |
| Brian Biggs (Trinity) | Republican | January 1, 2023 – Present | | 2005–Present; Part of Randolph County. |

== Election results ==
=== 2024 ===
North Carolina House of Representatives 70th district general election, 2024
| Party | Candidate | Votes | % |
|---|---|---|---|
| Republican | Brian Biggs (incumbent) | 33,617 | 76.17% |
| Democratic | Susan Lee "Susie" Scott | 10,520 | 23.83% |
| Total votes | | 44,137 | 100% |
| Republican hold | | | |

=== 2022 ===
North Carolina House of Representatives 70th district Republican primary election, 2022
| Party | Candidate | Votes | % |
|---|---|---|---|
| Republican | Brian Biggs | 5,213 | 52.27% |
| Republican | Pat Hurley (incumbent) | 4,760 | 47.73% |
| Total votes | | 9,973 | 100% |

North Carolina House of Representatives 70th district general election, 2022
| Party | Candidate | Votes | % |
|---|---|---|---|
| Republican | Brian Biggs | 22,160 | 79.01% |
| Democratic | Susan Lee "Susie" Scott | 5,887 | 20.99% |
| Total votes | | 28,047 | 100% |
| Republican hold | | | |

=== 2020 ===
North Carolina House of Representatives 70th district general election, 2020
| Party | Candidate | Votes | % |
|---|---|---|---|
| Republican | Pat Hurley (incumbent) | 28,546 | 75.87% |
| Democratic | Susan Lee "Susie" Scott | 9,080 | 24.13% |
| Total votes | | 37,626 | 100% |
| Republican hold | | | |

=== 2018 ===
North Carolina House of Representatives 70th district general election, 2018
| Party | Candidate | Votes | % |
|---|---|---|---|
| Republican | Pat Hurley (incumbent) | 18,717 | 76.91% |
| Democratic | Mary Rulli | 5,620 | 23.09% |
| Total votes | | 24,337 | 100% |
| Republican hold | | | |

=== 2016 ===
North Carolina House of Representatives 70th district general election, 2016
| Party | Candidate | Votes | % |
|---|---|---|---|
| Republican | Pat Hurley (incumbent) | 24,856 | 76.14% |
| Democratic | Lois Bohnsack | 7,789 | 23.86% |
| Total votes | | 32,645 | 100% |
| Republican hold | | | |

=== 2014 ===
North Carolina House of Representatives 70th district general election, 2014
| Party | Candidate | Votes | % |
|---|---|---|---|
| Republican | Pat Hurley (incumbent) | 15,508 | 100% |
| Total votes | | 15,508 | 100% |
| Republican hold | | | |

=== 2012 ===
North Carolina House of Representatives 70th district general election, 2012
| Party | Candidate | Votes | % |
|---|---|---|---|
| Republican | Pat Hurley (incumbent) | 24,642 | 100% |
| Total votes | | 24,642 | 100% |
| Republican hold | | | |

=== 2010 ===
North Carolina House of Representatives 70th district Republican primary election, 2010
| Party | Candidate | Votes | % |
|---|---|---|---|
| Republican | Pat Hurley (incumbent) | 3,252 | 69.83% |
| Republican | Fred Burgess | 1,405 | 30.17% |
| Total votes | | 4,657 | 100% |

North Carolina House of Representatives 70th district general election, 2010
| Party | Candidate | Votes | % |
|---|---|---|---|
| Republican | Pat Hurley (incumbent) | 13,564 | 100% |
| Total votes | | 13,564 | 100% |
| Republican hold | | | |

=== 2008 ===
North Carolina House of Representatives 70th district general election, 2008
| Party | Candidate | Votes | % |
|---|---|---|---|
| Republican | Pat Hurley (incumbent) | 19,318 | 67.35% |
| Democratic | Bev O’Brien | 9,364 | 32.65% |
| Total votes | | 28,682 | 100% |
| Republican hold | | | |

=== 2006 ===
North Carolina House of Representatives 70th district Republican primary election, 2006
| Party | Candidate | Votes | % |
|---|---|---|---|
| Republican | Pat Hurley | 1,326 | 35.23% |
| Republican | Jim S. Parker | 1,317 | 34.99% |
| Republican | Lou Burrow Wilson | 1,121 | 29.78% |
| Total votes | | 3,764 | 100% |

North Carolina House of Representatives 70th district Republican primary run-off election, 2006
| Party | Candidate | Votes | % |
|---|---|---|---|
| Republican | Pat Hurley | 1,129 | 61.90% |
| Republican | Jim S. Parker | 695 | 38.10% |
| Total votes | | 1,824 | 100% |

North Carolina House of Representatives 70th district general election, 2006
| Party | Candidate | Votes | % |
|---|---|---|---|
| Republican | Pat Hurley | 8,756 | 64.77% |
| Democratic | Hampton "Happy" Spivey | 4,762 | 35.23% |
| Total votes | | 13,518 | 100% |
| Republican hold | | | |

=== 2004 ===
North Carolina House of Representatives 70th district Republican primary election, 2004
| Party | Candidate | Votes | % |
|---|---|---|---|
| Republican | Arlie Culp (incumbent) | 2,036 | 53.01% |
| Republican | Jim Parker | 958 | 24.94% |
| Republican | Bucky Jernigan | 847 | 22.05% |
| Total votes | | 3,841 | 100% |

North Carolina House of Representatives 70th district general election, 2004
| Party | Candidate | Votes | % |
|---|---|---|---|
| Republican | Arlie Culp (incumbent) | 19,578 | 91.58% |
| Libertarian | Douglas Kania | 1,801 | 8.42% |
| Total votes | | 21,379 | 100% |
| Republican hold | | | |

=== 2002 ===
North Carolina House of Representatives 70th district general election, 2002
| Party | Candidate | Votes | % |
|---|---|---|---|
| Republican | Bobby Barbee Sr. (incumbent) | 8,993 | 50.68% |
| Democratic | Max Melton | 8,751 | 49.32% |
| Total votes | | 17,744 | 100% |
| Republican hold | | | |

=== 2000 ===
North Carolina House of Representatives 70th district general election, 2000
| Party | Candidate | Votes | % |
|---|---|---|---|
| Democratic | Toby Fitch (incumbent) | 13,033 | 100% |
| Total votes | | 13,033 | 100% |
| Democratic hold | | | |
