= Bobby H. Barbee Sr. =

American politician

Bobby Barbee

Member of the North Carolina House of Representatives
- In office January 1, 1987 – January 1, 2005
- Preceded by: Dwight Quinn; Joseph Hudson
- Succeeded by: David Almond (Redistricting)
- Constituency: 34th District (1987-1993); 82nd District (1993-2003); 70th District (2003-2005)

Personal details
- Born: Bobby Harold Barbee Sr. November 24, 1927 Stanly County, North Carolina
- Died: February 26, 2013 (aged 85) Concord, North Carolina
- Party: Republican
- Spouse: Jacqueline Pethel
- Children: 5
- Occupation: insurance executive

Bobby Harold Barbee Sr. (November 24, 1927 – February 26, 2013) was a Republican member of the North Carolina General Assembly representing the state's seventieth House district, including constituents in Stanly and Union counties. An insurance executive from Locust, North Carolina, Barbee served his ninth term in the state House from 2003 to 2004.

He retired in 2004 and died in 2013.

== Electoral history ==
=== 2004 ===
North Carolina House of Representatives 67th district Republican primary election, 2004
Party	Candidate	Votes	%
Republican	David Almond	1,686	39.83%
Republican	Bobby Barbee (incumbent)	1,603	37.87%
Republican	Kenny Furr	457	10.80%
Republican	Lester F. Galloway	284	6.71%
Republican	W. P. "Bill" Davis	203	4.80%
Total votes		4,233	100%

North Carolina House of Representatives 67th district Republican primary run-off election, 2004
Party	Candidate	Votes	%
Republican	David Almond	2,322	64.97%
Republican	Bobby Barbee (incumbent)	1,252	35.03%
Total votes		3,574	100%

=== 2002 ===
North Carolina House of Representatives 70th district general election, 2002
Party	Candidate	Votes	%
Republican	Bobby Barbee (incumbent)	8,993	50.68%
Democratic	Max Melton	8,751	49.32%
Total votes		17,744	100%
Republican hold			

=== 2000 ===
North Carolina House of Representatives 82nd district Republican primary election, 2000
Party	Candidate	Votes	%
Republican	Bobby Barbee (incumbent)	2,490	46.63%
Republican	David Almond	1,947	36.46%
Republican	Kenny Furr	903	16.91%
Total votes		5,340	100%

North Carolina House of Representatives 82nd district general election, 2000
Party	Candidate	Votes	%
Republican	Bobby Barbee (incumbent)	19,092	100%
Total votes		19,092	100%
Republican hold			

North Carolina House of Representatives
Preceded by Dwight Quinn; Joseph Hudson	Member of the North Carolina House of Representatives from the 34th district 1987-1993; Served alongside: William Alexander, Coy Privette, Tim Tallent, Clayton Loflin	Succeeded by Bobby Griffin
Preceded by Constituency established	Member of the North Carolina House of Representatives from the 82nd district 1993-2003	Succeeded by Gene Wilson
Preceded by Shelly Willingham	Member of the North Carolina House of Representatives from the 70th district 2003-2005	Succeeded by Arlie Culp
