= Deborah Ross (politician) =

American politician (born 1963)

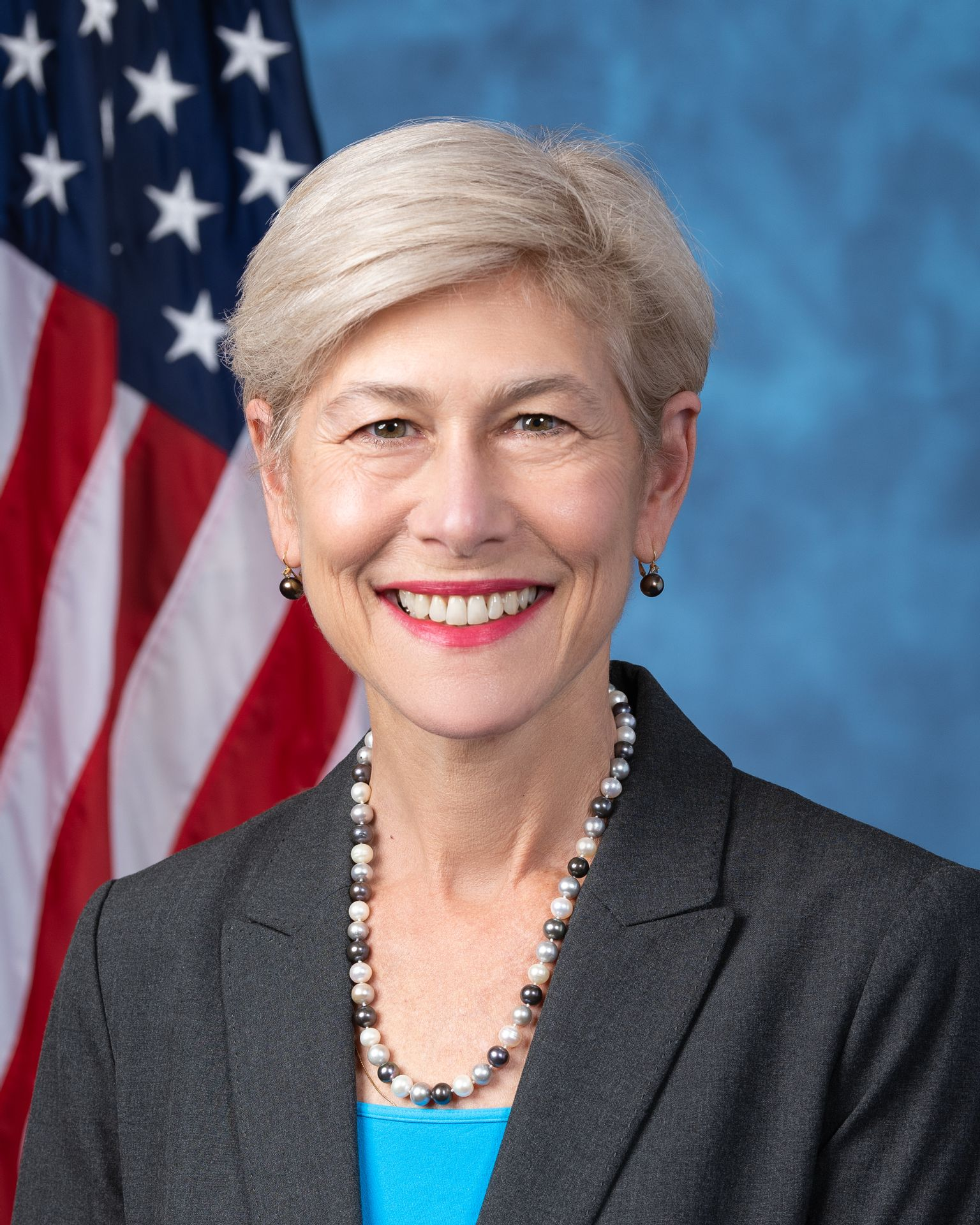
- Official portrait, 2020

Member of the U.S. House of Representatives from North Carolina's 2nd district
- Incumbent
- Assumed office January 3, 2021
- Preceded by: George Holding

Member of the North Carolina House of Representatives
- In office January 29, 2003 – June 1, 2013
- Preceded by: Bob Hensley (38th); Grier Martin (34th)
- Succeeded by: Grier Martin
- Constituency: 38th district (2003–2013); 34th district (2013)

Personal details
- Born: Deborah Koff; June 20, 1963 (age 63) Philadelphia, Pennsylvania, U.S.
- Party: Democratic
- Spouse: Stephen Wrinn (m. 1994)
- Education: Brown University (BA); University of North Carolina, Chapel Hill (JD)
- Website: House website Campaign website
- Ross's voice Ross on the CHIPS and Science Act. Recorded July 28, 2022

Deborah Ross (née Koff; born June 20, 1963) is an American lawyer and politician who has served as the U.S. representative for North Carolina's 2nd congressional district since 2021. Her district is based in Raleigh. A member of the Democratic Party, Ross served as a member of the North Carolina House of Representatives from 2003 to 2013, representing the state's 38th and then 34th House district, including much of northern Raleigh and surrounding suburbs in Wake County.

Ross was the Democratic nominee in the 2016 U.S. Senate election in North Carolina, unsuccessfully challenging Republican incumbent Richard Burr in the general election.

== Early life and education ==
Ross was born in Philadelphia, Pennsylvania, on June 20, 1963, and grew up in Connecticut. She is the daughter of Barbara (née Klein) and Marvin Koff. Her father was an Air Force physician and her mother was a teacher.

Ross earned her Bachelor of Arts degree from Brown University in 1985 and her Juris Doctor from the University of North Carolina School of Law in 1990.

== Legal career ==
After graduating from law school, Ross worked for Raleigh-based Hunton & Williams as a tax litigator and municipal bond lawyer. She taught at Duke Law School as a senior lecturing fellow.

=== American Civil Liberties Union ===
Ross was hired as state director for the American Civil Liberties Union (ACLU) of North Carolina in 1994. She worked on First Amendment and juvenile justice issues. Alongside Governor Jim Hunt and then State Senator Roy Cooper, she overhauled North Carolina's system for dealing with youth offenders. In response to racial profiling reports, she also successfully encouraged state police agencies to collect race-based statistics for traffic stops. Ross stepped down from her position at the ACLU in 2002 when she launched her state House campaign.

=== GoTriangle ===
On May 1, 2013, Ross announced she would resign from the legislature in June to serve as legal counsel for GoTriangle, the triangle area's regional transit agency. On June 1, 2013, Grier Martin was appointed to succeed her in the House.

=== Smith Moore Leatherwood LLP ===
In March 2017, Ross joined the regional law firm of Smith Moore Leatherwood LLP in Raleigh. Her practice focused on the economic development, energy, utilities, and infrastructure needs of businesses and government. Smith Moore Leatherwood combined with national law firm Fox Rothschild, LLP, on November 1, 2018.

== Early political career ==
=== North Carolina legislature ===
Ross was first elected to the North Carolina General Assembly in 2002 and defeated Wake County Commissioner Phil Jeffreys in 2004 to win a second term. She faced no opposition in the 2006 general election, and in 2007, Ross was first elected as one of the House Democratic Whips.

Ross supported the Equal Pay Act, an unsuccessful bill that would have banned North Carolina employers from paying workers differently based on gender.

In 2012, Ross compared state coastal protection policies that ignore scientists' sea level rise forecasts to burying one's "head in the sand". She said she was concerned that increased risk of flooding would lead insurance companies to charge higher premiums for coastal property owners.

=== 2016 U.S. Senate campaign ===
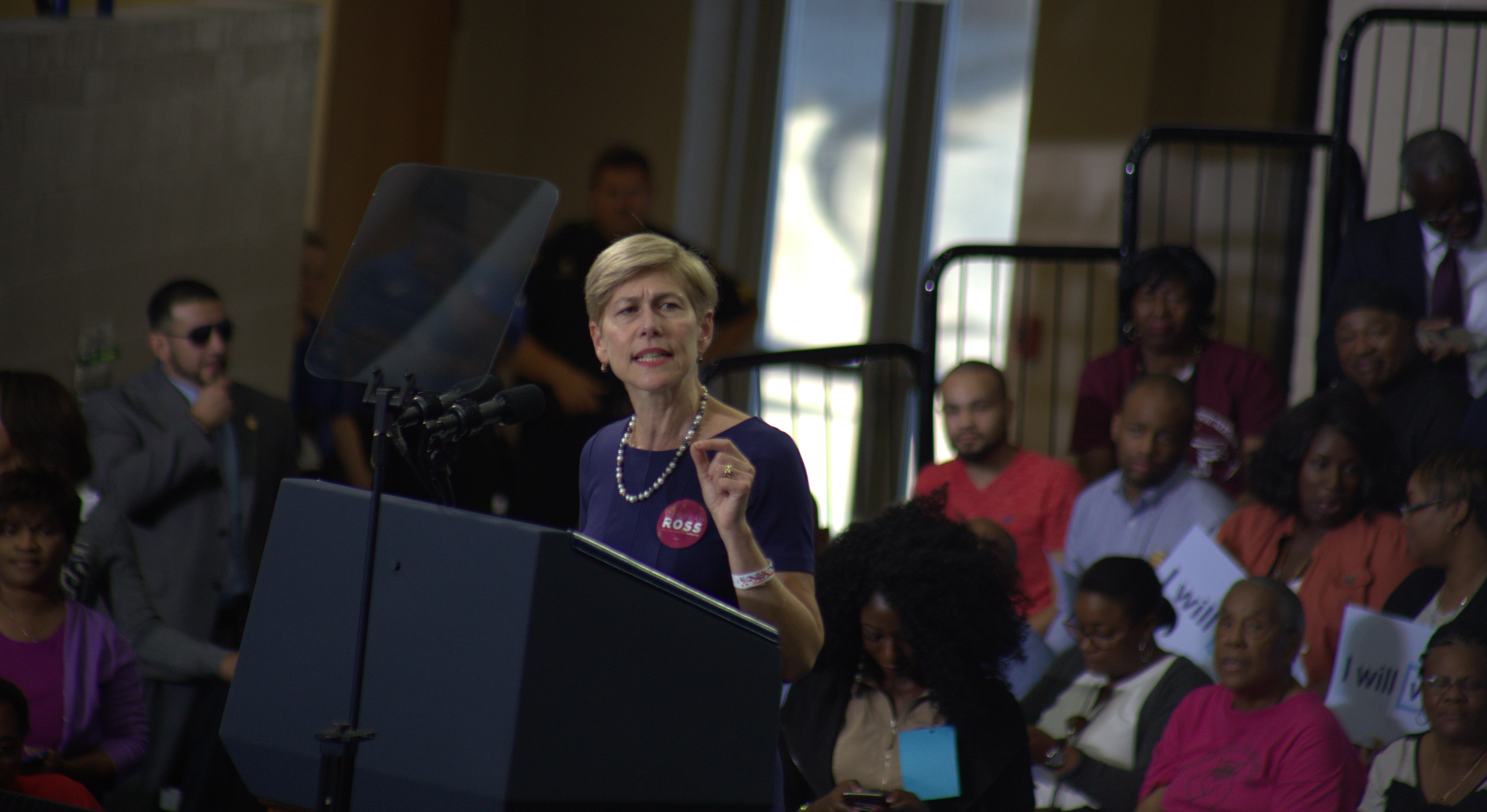
Ross campaigns for the U.S. Senate, 2016

In 2015, Ross resigned as legal counsel at GoTriangle to run for the U.S. Senate in 2016. She won the March 2016 Democratic primary with 62.4% of the vote from a field of four candidates. Ross was endorsed by EMILYs List, Planned Parenthood, the North Carolina Association of Educators, the North Carolina AFL–CIO, American Association for Justice, End Citizens United, the Democratic Senatorial Campaign Committee, Democracy for America, and the League of Conservation Voters.

In the general election, Ross ran against the incumbent, Republican Richard Burr. Ross raised more money than Burr for three consecutive quarters, but nevertheless had less cash on hand as Burr began the year with $5.3 million in campaign funds. As of October 21, Ross was down 2.8% in the Real Clear Politics average of polls. The race received national attention as The Cook Political Report rated the race a toss-up and Democrats viewed the seat as one they could win. in the November election, Burr defeated Ross 51% to 45%.

== U.S. House of Representatives ==
=== Elections ===
==== 2020 ====
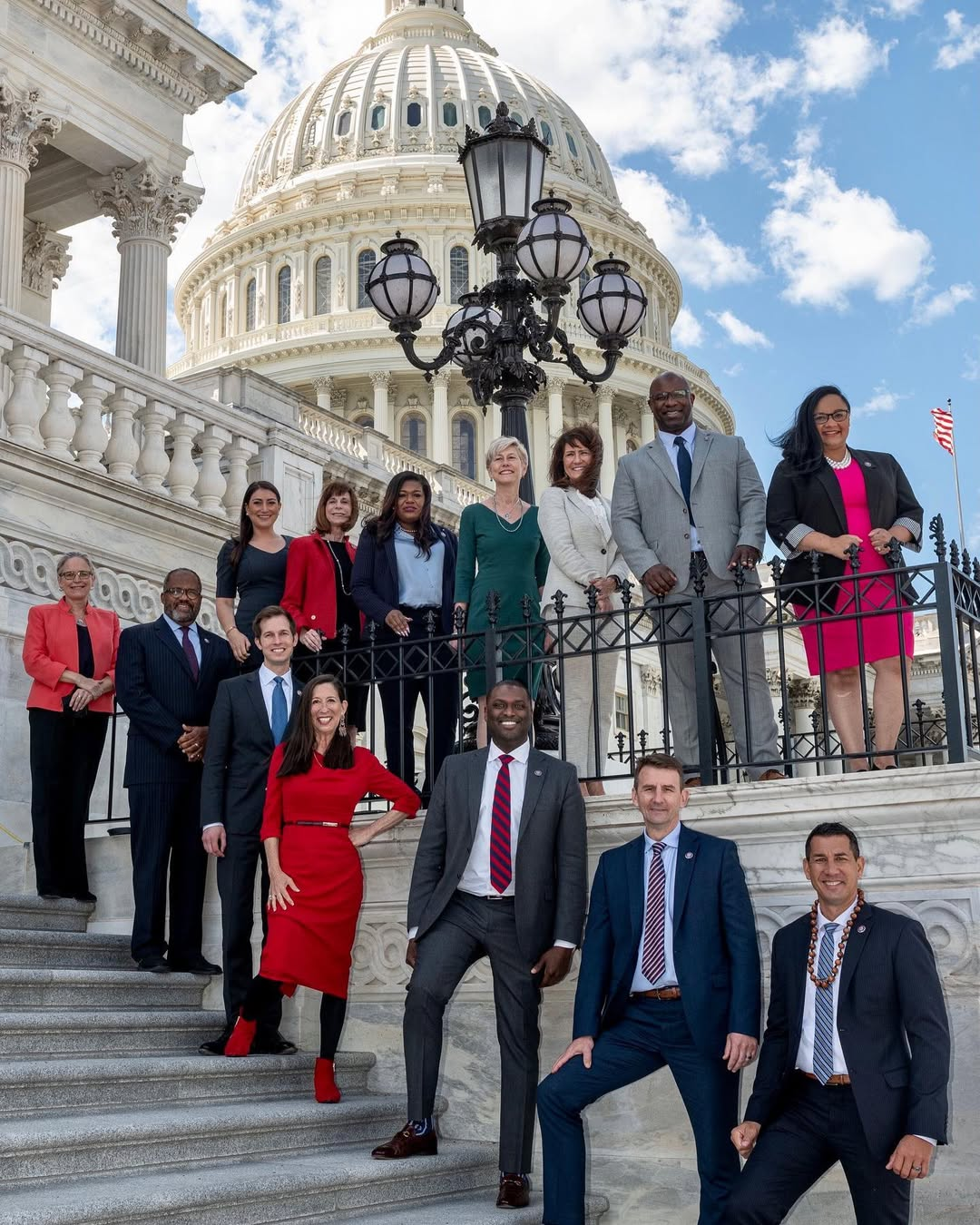
Ross and Democratic first-time members of the 117th Congress, 2021

On December 2, 2019, Ross announced her candidacy for the U.S. House of Representatives in North Carolina's newly redrawn 2nd congressional district in 2020. She jumped into the race shortly after a court-ordered redistricting cut the 2nd back to southern Wake County, including almost all of Raleigh. The old 2nd covered roughly half of Wake County, along with several exurbs south and east of the capital.

Had the district existed in 2016, Hillary Clinton would have carried it with 60% of the vote and defeated Donald Trump by over 24 points. By comparison, Trump carried the old 2nd with 53% of the vote, defeating Clinton by 12 points. On paper, the new map turned the 2nd from a Republican-leaning district into a safely Democratic district.

With pundits suggesting that the 2nd was a likely Democratic pickup, Republican incumbent George Holding, who had represented much of the area for two terms in the 13th district before it was essentially merged with the 2nd in 2016, opted to retire. Holding said that the significantly bluer hue of the new 2nd figured significantly in his decision.

Ross won the Democratic primary on March 3. She won the general election on November 3, defeating Republican nominee Alan Swain and Libertarian Jeff Matemu.

=== Tenure ===
On July 1, 2021, Ross and Mariannette Miller-Meeks introduced the America's CHILDREN Act. If enacted, the bill would grant a pathway to permanent residency for children who grew up in the United States legally but were blocked from obtaining permanent residency due to green card backlogs and other legal barriers.

On June 23, 2025, Ross, Lance Gooden, and Dina Titus introduced the Pro Codes Act. If enacted, the bill would allow private, for-profit corporations to claim copyright of laws based on the "model codes" they sell to government bodies. This would overturn cases like Veeck v. Southern Building Code Congress Int'l that have held that the public has the right to view, copy, dissect, and critique laws they are held to regardless of the authorship of the text.

=== Committee assignments ===
For the 119th Congress:

- Committee on Ethics
- Committee on the Judiciary
  - Subcommittee on Courts, Intellectual Property, Artificial Intelligence, and the Internet
  - Subcommittee on Immigration Integrity, Security, and Enforcement
- Committee on Science, Space, and Technology
  - Subcommittee on Energy (Ranking Member)
  - Subcommittee on Environment

=== Caucus memberships ===
- Black Maternal Health Caucus
- Congressional Asian Pacific American Caucus
- Congressional Equality Caucus
- Congressional Ukraine Caucus
- New Democrat Coalition
- Democratic Women’s Caucus
- Rare Disease Caucus

== Political positions ==
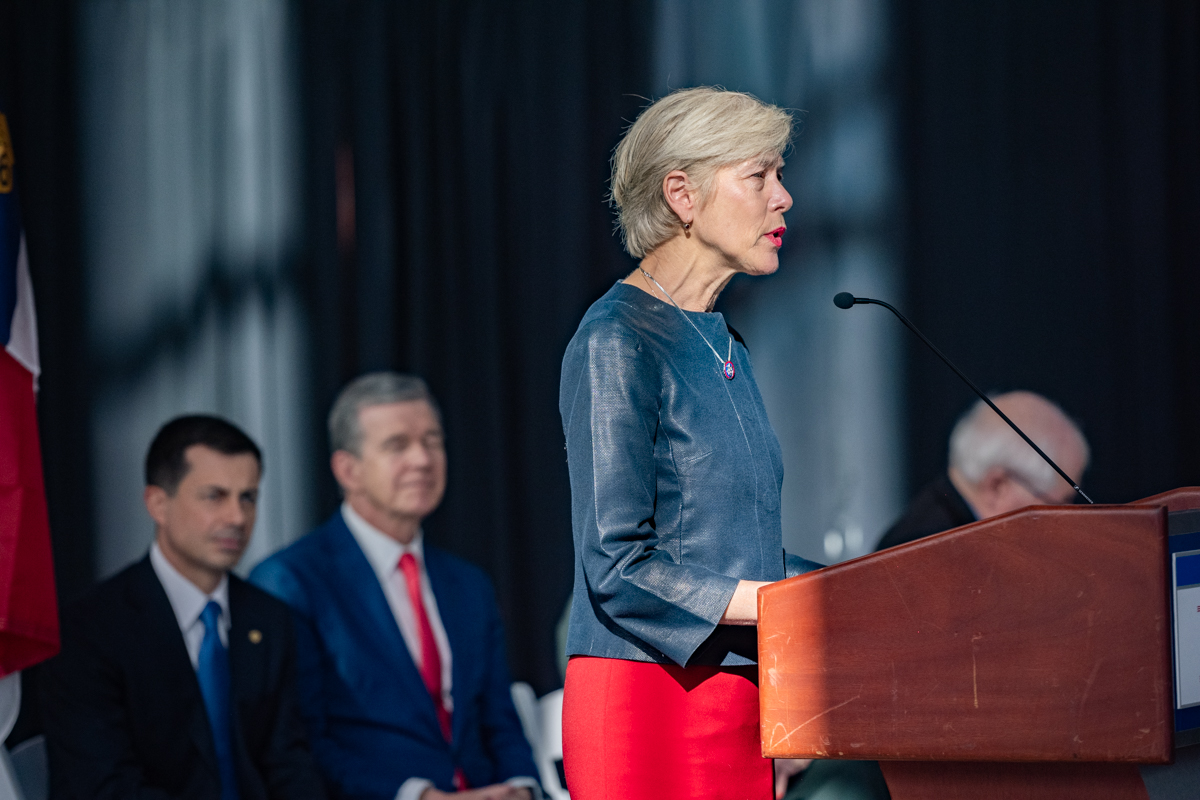
Ross discusses investments in rail projects enabled by the bipartisan infrastructure bill, 2023

Ross has supported legislation that expands tax credits for families. She voted for the American Rescue Plan Act of 2021, which increased the Child Tax Credit from $2,000 to $3,000 per child aged 6 to 17 and to $3,600 for children under 6, with payments distributed monthly instead of as a lump sum.

She supported legislation that expanded premium subsidies under the Affordable Care Act (ACA) and offered financial incentives to states that had not yet expanded Medicaid under the ACA.

She voted for the Infrastructure Investment and Jobs Act, which provided $8 billion of funding for highways and public transportation in North Carolina. The legislation also directed funds toward expanding broadband access in rural communities and replacing lead water pipes nationwide.

Ross supported the CHIPS and Science Act of 2022, a $280 billion bill aimed at increasing U.S. semiconductor manufacturing. Following its passage, semiconductor manufacturer Wolfspeed announced plans to build a $5 billion production facility in Chatham County.

== Personal life ==
Ross and her husband, Steve Wrinn, live in a home that they restored in Boylan Heights, a historic neighborhood in Raleigh.

Ross is one of three Unitarian Universalists in Congress.

== Electoral history ==
=== 2024 ===
N.C. 2nd Congressional District 2024 General Election
Party	Candidate	Votes	%
Democratic	Deborah K. Ross (incumbent)	268,662	66.25
Republican	Alan Swain	128,164	31.61
Green	Michael Dublin	8,691	2.14
Total votes		405,517	100

=== 2022 ===
N.C. 2nd Congressional District 2022 General Election
Party	Candidate	Votes	%
Democratic	Deborah K. Ross (incumbent)	190,714	64.68
Republican	Christine Villaverde	104,155	35.32
Total votes		294,869	100

=== 2020 ===
N.C. 2nd Congressional District 2020 General Election
Party	Candidate	Votes	%
Democratic	Deborah K. Ross	311,887	62.96
Republican	Alan Swain	172,544	34.83
Libertarian	Jeff Matemu	10,914	2.20
Total votes		495,345	100

=== 2016 ===
2016 U.S. Senate Election in North Carolina
Party	Candidate	Votes	%
Republican	Richard Burr (incumbent)	2,395,376	51.06
Democratic	Deborah K. Ross	2,128,165	45.37
Libertarian	Sean Haugh	167,592	3.57
Total votes		4,691,133	100

2016 U.S. Senate Democratic Primary
Party	Candidate	Votes	%
Democratic	Deborah Ross	614,414	62.32%
Democratic	Chris Rey	162,869	16.52%
Democratic	Kevin Griffin	115,618	11.73%
Democratic	Ernest Reeves	93,005	9.43%
Total votes		985,906	100.00%

=== 2010 ===
North Carolina House of Representatives 38th district general election, 2010
Party	Candidate	Votes	%
Democratic	Deborah Ross (incumbent)	14,093	65.63%
Republican	Madison E. Shook	7,382	34.37%
Total votes		21,475	100%
Democratic hold			

=== 2008 ===
North Carolina House of Representatives 38th district general election, 2008
Party	Candidate	Votes	%
Democratic	Deborah Ross (incumbent)	26,754	84.88%
Libertarian	Susan J. Hogarth	4,764	15.12%
Total votes		31,518	100%
Democratic hold			

=== 2006 ===
North Carolina House of Representatives 38th district Democratic primary election, 2006
Party	Candidate	Votes	%
Democratic	Deborah Ross (incumbent)	2,197	95.44%
Democratic	Demian Dellinger	105	4.56%
Total votes		2,302	100%

North Carolina House of Representatives 38th district general election, 2006
Party	Candidate	Votes	%
Democratic	Deborah Ross (incumbent)	11,819	100%
Total votes		11,819	100%
Democratic hold			

=== 2004 ===
North Carolina House of Representatives 38th district general election, 2004
Party	Candidate	Votes	%
Democratic	Deborah Ross (incumbent)	20,121	66.51%
Republican	Phil Jeffreys	10,131	33.49%
Total votes		30,252	100%
Democratic hold			

=== 2002 ===
North Carolina House of Representatives 38th district Democratic primary election, 2002
Party	Candidate	Votes	%
Democratic	Deborah Ross	2,926	46.64%
Democratic	Alexander Killens	2,108	33.60%
Democratic	Gene Jordan	1,239	19.75%
Total votes		6,273	100%

North Carolina House of Representatives 38th district general election, 2002
Party	Candidate	Votes	%
Democratic	Deborah Ross	12,566	89.68%
Libertarian	Casey Gardner	1,446	10.32%
Total votes		14,012	100%
Democratic hold			

== See also ==
- Women in the United States House of Representatives

Party political offices
Preceded by Elaine Marshall	Democratic nominee for U.S. Senator from North Carolina (Class 3); 2016	Succeeded by Cheri Beasley
U.S. House of Representatives
Preceded by George Holding	Member of the U.S. House of Representatives from North Carolina's 2nd congressional district 2021–present	Incumbent
U.S. order of precedence (ceremonial)
Preceded by August Pfluger	United States representatives by seniority 273rd	Succeeded by Maria Elvira Salazar
