= Arlie F. Culp =

American politician

Arlie Culp
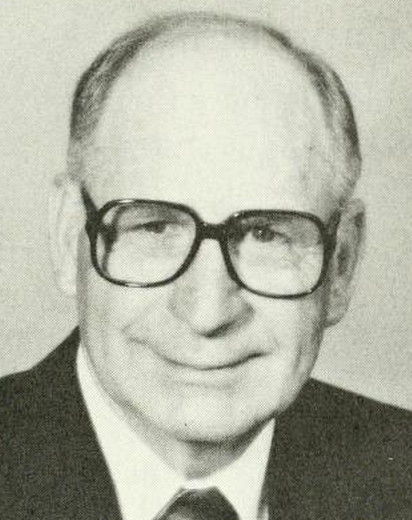

Member of the North Carolina House of Representatives
- In office January 1, 1989 – January 1, 2007
- Preceded by: William Thomas Boyd
- Succeeded by: Pat Hurley
- Constituency: 30th District (1989-2003); 67th District (2003-2005); 70th District (2005-2007)

Personal details
- Born: April 9, 1926 Badin, North Carolina
- Died: October 18, 2017 (aged 91)
- Party: Republican
- Spouse: Daisy Mae Farlow (m. 1950)
- Education: Catawba College
- Occupation: conservationist

Arlie Franklin Culp (April 9, 1926 – October 18, 2017) was a Republican member of the North Carolina General Assembly, United States, for nine terms. He represented the state's sixty-seventh House district, including constituents in Randolph county. A retiree from Ramseur, North Carolina, Culp retired from the state House in 2006. He died on October 18, 2017.

== Recent electoral history ==
=== 2004 ===
North Carolina House of Representatives 70th district Republican primary election, 2004
Party	Candidate	Votes	%
Republican	Arlie Culp (incumbent)	2,036	53.01%
Republican	Jim Parker	958	24.94%
Republican	Bucky Jernigan	847	22.05%
Total votes		3,841	100%

North Carolina House of Representatives 70th district general election, 2004
Party	Candidate	Votes	%
Republican	Arlie Culp (incumbent)	19,578	91.58%
Libertarian	Douglas Kania	1,801	8.42%
Total votes		21,379	100%
Republican hold			

=== 2002 ===
North Carolina House of Representatives 67th district general election, 2002
Party	Candidate	Votes	%
Republican	Arlie Culp (incumbent)	10,481	68.13%
Democratic	Mary Tate Blake	4,902	31.87%
Total votes		15,383	100%
Republican hold			

=== 2000 ===
North Carolina House of Representatives 30th district general election, 2000
Party	Candidate	Votes	%
Republican	Arlie Culp (incumbent)	13,978	62.13%
Democratic	Matilda Phillips	8,040	35.74%
Libertarian	Victoria D. Prevo	479	2.13%
Total votes		22,497	100%
Republican hold			

North Carolina House of Representatives
Preceded by William Thomas Boyd	Member of the North Carolina House of Representatives from the 30th district 1989–2003	Succeeded by Paul Luebke
Preceded by Warren Oldham	Member of the North Carolina House of Representatives from the 67th district 2003–2005	Succeeded by David Almond
Preceded by Bobby Barbee	Member of the North Carolina House of Representatives from the 70th district 2005–2007	Succeeded by Pat Hurley
