= North Carolina Department of Military and Veterans Affairs =

Department of Military and Veterans Affairs
- Seal of the North Carolina Department of Military and Veterans Affairs

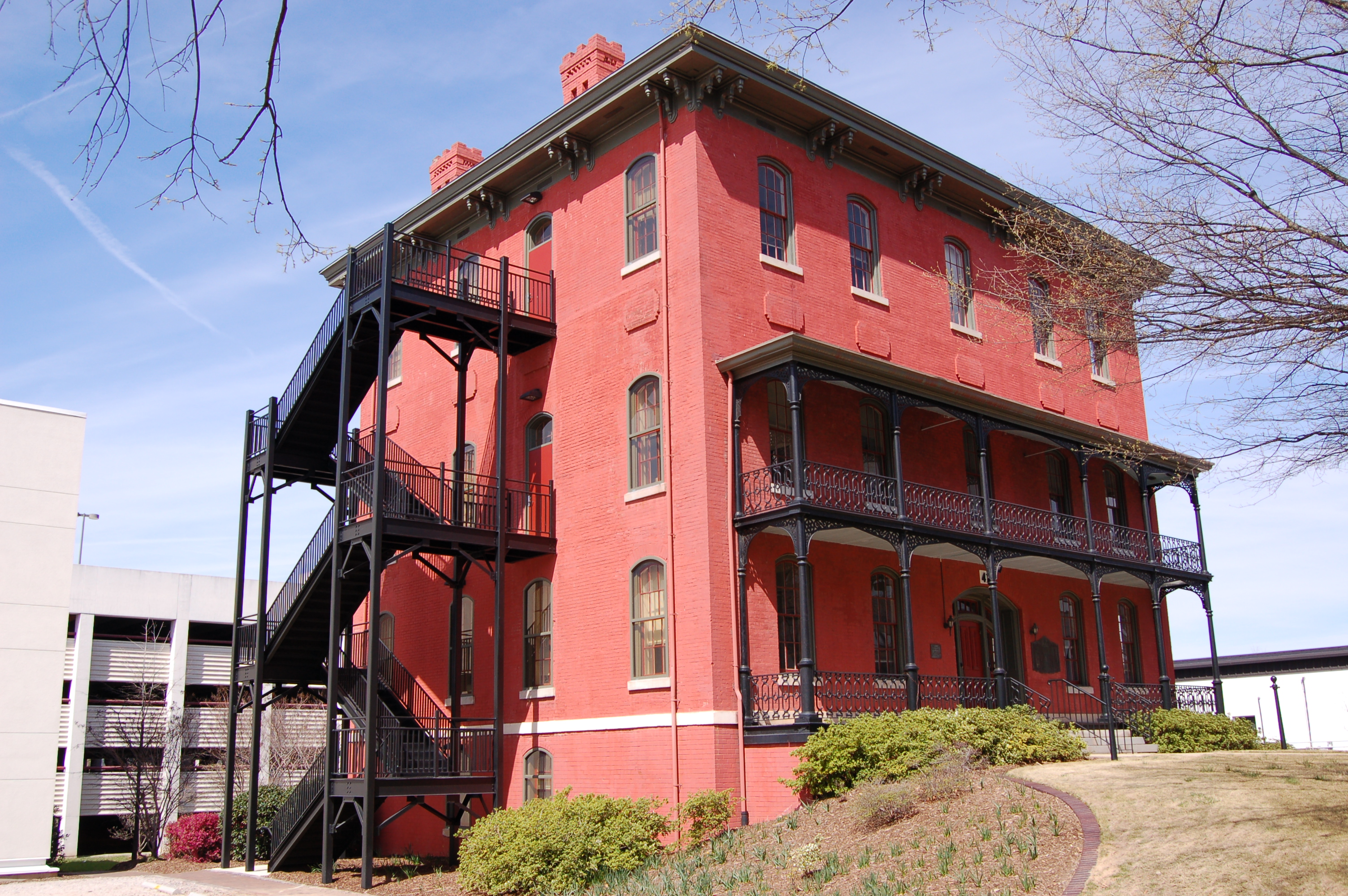
- Raleigh and Gaston / Seaboard Coast Line Building, headquarters of the NC Department of Military & Veterans Affairs

Department overview
- Formed: 10 November 2015; 10 years ago (as State Cabinet Department)
- Preceding Department: Division of Veterans Affairs and Military Affairs Advisor to the Governor
- Type: Executive Department
- Headquarters: Seaboard Building, Wake County, North Carolina; United States; 35°47′08″N 78°38′23″W
- Employees: 100
- Department executive: Jocelyn Mitnaul Mallette, Secretary of Military & Veterans Affairs
- Child agencies: Division of Military Affairs; Division of Veterans Affairs; Military Affairs Commission
- Website: www.milvets.nc.gov

The North Carolina Department of Military and Veterans Affairs (DMVA) is a state agency designed to advocate for the relationship the state has with its military and veterans' installations and populations. It was created by the North Carolina General Assembly with the support of Governor Pat McCrory. The current head of the Department is Secretary Jocelyn Mitnaul Mallette, an Air Force veteran appointed by Governor Josh Stein. Prior to the creation of the Department, the Division of Veterans Affairs was under the Department of Administration, while all military-related matters fell under the Department of Commerce.

== History ==
=== Early history ===
The Department of Military and Veterans Affairs was created by the Executive Organization Act of 1971 and was officially activated as a functional agency on March 8, 1972. During its early tenure it was responsible for the North Carolina National Guard, the office of the Adjutant General of North Carolina, the Civil Preparedness Agency, and the Civil Air Patrol. It was abolished in 1977 and merged with several other agencies to become the Department of Crime Control and Public Safety.

In his 2015 state of the state address, Governor Pat McCrory declared it his goal to reestablish the department. Later that year the North Carolina General Assembly passed the state budget which provided for the recreation of the agency.

== See also ==
- Government of North Carolina

== Works cited ==
- Cheney, John L. Jr., ed. (1981). North Carolina Government, 1585-1979: A Narrative and Statistical History (revised ed.). Raleigh: North Carolina Secretary of State. OCLC 1290270510.
