= North Carolina's 34th House district =

American legislative district

North Carolina's 34th State House of Representatives district
Representative
Tim Longest; D–Raleigh
- Demographics: 64% White; 16% Black; 13% Hispanic; 3% Asian; 1% Other; 4% Multiracial
- Population (2024): 91,711

North Carolina's 34th House district is one of 120 districts in the North Carolina House of Representatives. It has been represented by Democrat Tim Longest since 2023.

== Geography ==
Since 2003, the district has included part of Wake County. The district overlaps with the 15th, 16th, and 18th Senate districts.

== District officeholders ==
=== Multi-member district ===
Representative	Party	Dates	Notes	Representative	Party	Dates	Notes	Representative	Party	Dates	Notes	Representative	Party	Dates	Notes	Counties
District created January 1, 1967.
Samuel Troxell (Rockwell)	Republican	January 1, 1967 – January 1, 1971		Austin Mitchell (Kannapolis)	Republican	January 1, 1967 – January 1, 1973	Redistricted to the 31st district.									1967–1973; All of Rowan County.
Robie Nash (Salisbury)	Democratic	January 1, 1971 – January 1, 1973		Austin Mitchell (Kannapolis)	Republican	January 1, 1967 – January 1, 1973	Redistricted to the 31st district.									1967–1973; All of Rowan County.
Bill Stevens (Lenoir)	Republican	January 1, 1973 – January 1, 1975		John Walter Brown (Elkin)	Republican	January 1, 1973 – January 1, 1975	Redistricted from the 38th district.	Jeter Haynes (Jonesville)	Republican	January 1, 1973 – January 1, 1975	Redistricted from the 38th district.					1973–1983; All of Caldwell, Wilkes, and Yadkin counties.
Ralph Prestwood (Lenoir)	Democratic	January 1, 1975 – January 1, 1977		James Edwards (Granite Falls)	Democratic	January 1, 1975 – January 1, 1979		George Holmes (Hamptonville)	Republican	January 1, 1975 – January 1, 1977						1973–1983; All of Caldwell, Wilkes, and Yadkin counties.
Eugene White (Hudson)	Democratic	January 1, 1977 – January 1, 1981		James Edwards (Granite Falls)	Democratic	January 1, 1975 – January 1, 1979		Albert Martin (Boonville)	Democratic	January 1, 1977 – January 1, 1979						1973–1983; All of Caldwell, Wilkes, and Yadkin counties.
Eugene White (Hudson)	Democratic	January 1, 1977 – January 1, 1981		John Walter Brown (Elkin)	Republican	January 1, 1979 – January 1, 1983	Redistricted to the 41st district.	George Holmes (Hamptonville)	Republican	January 1, 1979 – January 1, 1983	Redistricted to the 41st district.					1973–1983; All of Caldwell, Wilkes, and Yadkin counties.
George Robinson (Cedar Rock)	Republican	January 1, 1981 – January 1, 1983	Redistricted to the 46th district.	John Walter Brown (Elkin)	Republican	January 1, 1979 – January 1, 1983	Redistricted to the 41st district.	George Holmes (Hamptonville)	Republican	January 1, 1979 – January 1, 1983	Redistricted to the 41st district.					1973–1983; All of Caldwell, Wilkes, and Yadkin counties.
Dwight Quinn (Kannapolis)	Democratic	January 1, 1983 – January 1, 1987	Redistricted from the 33rd district.	Betty Dorton Thomas (Concord)	Democratic	January 1, 1983 – January 1, 1985	Redistricted from the 33rd district.	Robert Slaughter (Albemarle)	Democratic	January 1, 1983 – January 1, 1985		Joe Hudson (Waxhaw)	Democratic	January 1, 1983 – January 1, 1987		1983–1993; All of Cabarrus, Stanly, and Union counties.
Dwight Quinn (Kannapolis)	Democratic	January 1, 1983 – January 1, 1987	Redistricted from the 33rd district.	Coy Privette (Kannapolis)	Republican	January 1, 1985 – January 1, 1993	Redistricted to the 90th district and retired to run for Congress.	Tim Tallent (Concord)	Republican	January 1, 1985 – January 1, 1993	Redistricted to the 81st district.	Joe Hudson (Waxhaw)	Democratic	January 1, 1983 – January 1, 1987		1983–1993; All of Cabarrus, Stanly, and Union counties.
William Alexander (Kannapolis)	Democratic	January 1, 1987 – January 1, 1989		Coy Privette (Kannapolis)	Republican	January 1, 1985 – January 1, 1993	Redistricted to the 90th district and retired to run for Congress.	Tim Tallent (Concord)	Republican	January 1, 1985 – January 1, 1993	Redistricted to the 81st district.	Bobby Barbee Sr. (Locust)	Republican	January 1, 1987 – January 1, 1993	Redistricted to the 82nd district.	1983–1993; All of Cabarrus, Stanly, and Union counties.
H. Clayton Loflin (Monroe)	Republican	January 1, 1989 – January 1, 1993		Coy Privette (Kannapolis)	Republican	January 1, 1985 – January 1, 1993	Redistricted to the 90th district and retired to run for Congress.	Tim Tallent (Concord)	Republican	January 1, 1985 – January 1, 1993	Redistricted to the 81st district.	Bobby Barbee Sr. (Locust)	Republican	January 1, 1987 – January 1, 1993	Redistricted to the 82nd district.	1983–1993; All of Cabarrus, Stanly, and Union counties.

=== Single-member district ===
Representative	Party	Dates	Notes	Counties
Bobby Griffin (Monroe)	Democratic	January 1, 1993 – January 1, 1995	Lost re-election.	1993–2003; Part of Union County.
Fern Shubert (Marshville)	Republican	January 1, 1995 – January 1, 1999	Lost re-election.	1993–2003; Part of Union County.
O. Max Melton (Monroe)	Democratic	January 1, 1999 – January 1, 2001	Lost re-election.	1993–2003; Part of Union County.
Fern Shubert (Marshville)	Republican	January 1, 2001 – January 1, 2003	Redistricted to the 73rd district and retired to run for State Senate.	1993–2003; Part of Union County.
Don Munford (Raleigh)	Republican	January 1, 2003 – January 1, 2005	Lost re-election.	2003–Present; Part of Wake County.
Grier Martin (Raleigh)	Democratic	January 1, 2005 – January 1, 2013	Retired.	2003–Present; Part of Wake County.
Deborah Ross (Raleigh)	Democratic	January 1, 2013 – June 1, 2013	Redistricted from the 38th district. Resigned.	2003–Present; Part of Wake County.
Grier Martin (Raleigh)	Democratic	June 1, 2013 – July 8, 2022	Appointed to finish Ross's term. Resigned.	2003–Present; Part of Wake County.
Vacant		July 8, 2022 – July 15, 2022		2003–Present; Part of Wake County.
Jack Nichols (Raleigh)	Democratic	July 15, 2022 – January 1, 2023	Appointed to finish Martin's term. Retired.	2003–Present; Part of Wake County.
Tim Longest (Raleigh)	Democratic	January 1, 2023 – Present		2003–Present; Part of Wake County.

== Election results ==
=== 2024 ===
North Carolina House of Representatives 34th district general election, 2024
Party	Candidate	Votes	%
Democratic	Tim Longest (incumbent)	33,839	75.79%
Libertarian	Ed George	10,808	24.21%
Total votes		44,647	100%
Democratic hold			

=== 2022 ===
North Carolina House of Representatives 34th district Republican primary election, 2022
Party	Candidate	Votes	%
Republican	Ashley Seshul	3,907	70.79%
Republican	Joshua Jordan	1,612	29.21%
Total votes		5,519	100%

North Carolina House of Representatives 34th district general election, 2022
Party	Candidate	Votes	%
Democratic	Tim Longest	24,413	60.27%
Republican	Ashley Seshul	14,853	36.67%
Libertarian	Kat McDonald	1,240	3.06%
Total votes		40,506	100%
Democratic hold			

=== 2020 ===
North Carolina House of Representatives 34th district general election, 2020
Party	Candidate	Votes	%
Democratic	Grier Martin (incumbent)	31,784	56.53%
Republican	Ronald L. Smith	21,989	39.11%
Libertarian	Michael Munger	2,449	4.36%
Total votes		56,222	100%
Democratic hold			

=== 2018 ===
North Carolina House of Representatives 34th district general election, 2018
Party	Candidate	Votes	%
Democratic	Grier Martin (incumbent)	26,348	65.51%
Republican	Catherine Whiteford	12,903	32.08%
Libertarian	Cap Hayes	970	2.41%
Total votes		40,221	100%
Democratic hold			

=== 2016 ===
North Carolina House of Representatives 34th district general election, 2016
Party	Candidate	Votes	%
Democratic	Grier Martin (incumbent)	31,335	67.56%
Republican	Bill Morris	15,049	32.44%
Total votes		46,384	100%
Democratic hold			

=== 2014 ===
North Carolina House of Representatives 34th district general election, 2014
Party	Candidate	Votes	%
Democratic	Grier Martin (incumbent)	22,929	100%
Total votes		22,929	100%
Democratic hold			

=== 2012 ===
North Carolina House of Representatives 34th district general election, 2012
Party	Candidate	Votes	%
Democratic	Deborah Ross (incumbent)	32,206	97.37%
Write-in		521	1.58%
Independent	Apryl Major (write-in)	348	1.05%
Total votes		33,075	100%
Democratic hold			

=== 2010 ===
North Carolina House of Representatives 34th district Republican primary election, 2010
Party	Candidate	Votes	%
Republican	Steve Henion	1,637	45.40%
Republican	Brian Tinga	1,231	34.14%
Republican	J. H. Ross	495	13.73%
Republican	Jamie Earp	243	6.74%
Total votes		3,606	100%

North Carolina House of Representatives 34th district general election, 2010
Party	Candidate	Votes	%
Democratic	Grier Martin (incumbent)	15,234	54.17%
Republican	Steve Henion	12,886	45.83%
Total votes		28,120	100%
Democratic hold			

=== 2008 ===
North Carolina House of Representatives 34th district general election, 2008
Party	Candidate	Votes	%
Democratic	Grier Martin (incumbent)	24,065	59.91%
Republican	J. H. Ross	16,102	40.09%
Total votes		40,167	100%
Democratic hold			

=== 2006 ===
North Carolina House of Representatives 34th district general election, 2006
Party	Candidate	Votes	%
Democratic	Grier Martin (incumbent)	13,596	59.13%
Republican	J. H. Ross	9,396	40.87%
Total votes		22,992	100%
Democratic hold			

=== 2004 ===
North Carolina House of Representatives 34th district Republican primary election, 2004
Party	Candidate	Votes	%
Republican	Don Munford (incumbent)	3,833	76.01%
Republican	J. H. Ross	1,210	23.99%
Total votes		5,043	100%

North Carolina House of Representatives 34th district general election, 2004
Party	Candidate	Votes	%
Democratic	Grier Martin	18,755	51.09%
Republican	Don Munford (incumbent)	17,952	48.91%
Total votes		36,707	100%
Democratic gain from Republican			

=== 2002 ===
North Carolina House of Representatives 34th district Republican primary election, 2002
Party	Candidate	Votes	%
Republican	Don Munford	3,688	62.96%
Republican	Albert Nelson Nunn	1,948	33.25%
Republican	J. H. Ross	222	3.79%
Total votes		5,858	100%

North Carolina House of Representatives 34th district general election, 2002
Party	Candidate	Votes	%
Republican	Don Munford	15,998	57.82%
Democratic	Cynthia Barnett	10,767	38.91%
Libertarian	Victor Marks	905	3.27%
Total votes		27,670	100%
Republican hold			

=== 2000 ===
North Carolina House of Representatives 34th district Republican primary election, 2000
Party	Candidate	Votes	%
Republican	Fern Shubert	1,900	71.81%
Republican	Ed Price	746	28.19%
Total votes		2,646	100%

North Carolina House of Representatives 34th district general election, 2000
Party	Candidate	Votes	%
Republican	Fern Shubert	13,117	53.71%
Democratic	O. Max Melton (incumbent)	11,306	46.29%
Total votes		24,423	100%
Republican gain from Democratic			
