= North Carolina's 20th House district =

American legislative district

North Carolina's 20th State House of Representatives district
Representative
Ted Davis Jr. R–Wilmington
- Demographics: 79% White; 7% Black; 7% Hispanic; 2% Asian; 5% Multiracial
- Population (2024): 95,007

North Carolina's 20th House district is one of 120 districts in the North Carolina House of Representatives. It has been represented by Republican Ted Davis Jr. since 2021.

== Geography ==
Since 2013, the district has included part of New Hanover County. The district overlaps with the 7th Senate district.

== District officeholders ==
=== Multi-member district ===
Representative	Party	Dates	Notes	Representative	Party	Dates	Notes	Representative	Party	Dates	Notes	Representative	Party	Dates	Notes	Representative	Party	Dates	Notes	Counties
District created January 1, 1967.
Ike Andrews (Siler City)	Democratic	January 1, 1967 – January 1, 1973	Redistricted to the 17th district and retired to run for Congress.	Donald Stanford (Chapel Hill)	Democratic	January 1, 1967 – January 1, 1971														1967–1973; All of Chatham and Orange counties.
Ike Andrews (Siler City)	Democratic	January 1, 1967 – January 1, 1973	Redistricted to the 17th district and retired to run for Congress.	Carl Smith (Chapel Hill)	Democratic	January 1, 1971 – January 1, 1973														1967–1973; All of Chatham and Orange counties.
Norwood Bryan Jr. (Fayetteville)	Democratic	January 1, 1973 – January 1, 1975	Redistricted from the 23rd district.	Sneed High (Fayetteville)	Democratic	January 1, 1973 – January 1, 1975	Redistricted from the 23rd district.	Henry Tyson (Fayetteville)	Democratic	January 1, 1973 – January 1, 1975		Glenn Jernigan (Fayetteville)	Democratic	January 1, 1973 – January 1, 1975	Redistricted from the 23rd district. Retired to run for State Senate.	Lura Tally (Fayetteville)	Democratic	January 1, 1973 – January 1, 1983	Retired to run for State Senate.	1973–1983; All of Cumberland County.
Hector Ray (Fayetteville)	Democratic	January 1, 1975 – January 1, 1979		R. D. Beard (Fayetteville)	Democratic	January 1, 1975 – January 1, 1983	Redistricted to the 18th district.	George Breece (Fayetteville)	Democratic	January 1, 1975 – January 1, 1977		Charles Holt (Fayetteville)	Democratic	January 1, 1975 – January 1, 1983		Lura Tally (Fayetteville)	Democratic	January 1, 1973 – January 1, 1983	Retired to run for State Senate.	1973–1983; All of Cumberland County.
Hector Ray (Fayetteville)	Democratic	January 1, 1975 – January 1, 1979		R. D. Beard (Fayetteville)	Democratic	January 1, 1975 – January 1, 1983	Redistricted to the 18th district.	Henry Tyson (Fayetteville)	Democratic	January 1, 1977 – January 1, 1983	Redistricted to the 18th district.	Charles Holt (Fayetteville)	Democratic	January 1, 1975 – January 1, 1983		Lura Tally (Fayetteville)	Democratic	January 1, 1973 – January 1, 1983	Retired to run for State Senate.	1973–1983; All of Cumberland County.
William Clark (Fayetteville)	Democratic	January 1, 1979 – January 1, 1983	Redistricted to the 18th district.	R. D. Beard (Fayetteville)	Democratic	January 1, 1975 – January 1, 1983	Redistricted to the 18th district.	Henry Tyson (Fayetteville)	Democratic	January 1, 1977 – January 1, 1983	Redistricted to the 18th district.	Charles Holt (Fayetteville)	Democratic	January 1, 1975 – January 1, 1983		Lura Tally (Fayetteville)	Democratic	January 1, 1973 – January 1, 1983	Retired to run for State Senate.	1973–1983; All of Cumberland County.
George Brannan (Smithfield)	Democratic	January 1, 1983 – January 1, 1989	Redistricted from the 14th district.	Barney Paul Woodard (Princeton)	Democratic	January 1, 1983 – January 1, 1993														1983–1993; All of Franklin and Johnston counties.
Billy Creech (Clayton)	Republican	January 1, 1989 – January 1, 1993	Redistricted to the single-member district.	Barney Paul Woodard (Princeton)	Democratic	January 1, 1983 – January 1, 1993														1983–1993; All of Franklin and Johnston counties.

=== Single-member district ===
Representative	Party	Dates	Notes	Counties
Billy Creech (Clayton)	Republican	January 1, 1993 – January 1, 2003	Redistricted from the multi-member district. Redistricted to the 26th district.	1993–2003; Parts of Franklin, Nash, and Johnston counties.
Dewey Hill (Lake Waccamaw)	Democratic	January 1, 2003 – January 1, 2013	Redistricted from the 14th district. Redistricted to the 46th district and retired.	2003–2005; Parts of Columbus and Brunswick counties.
Dewey Hill (Lake Waccamaw)	Democratic	January 1, 2003 – January 1, 2013	Redistricted from the 14th district. Redistricted to the 46th district and retired.	2005–2013; All of Columbus County. Part of Brunswick County.
Rick Catlin (Wilmington)	Republican	January 1, 2013 – August 15, 2016	Resigned.	2013–Present; Part of New Hanover County.
Vacant		August 15, 2016 – August 29, 2016		2013–Present; Part of New Hanover County.
Holly Grange (Wilmington)	Republican	August 29, 2016 – January 1, 2021	Appointed to finish Catlin's term. Retired to run for Governor.	2013–Present; Part of New Hanover County.
Ted Davis Jr. (Wilmington)	Republican	January 1, 2021 – Present	Redistricted from the 19th district. Retiring.	2013–Present; Part of New Hanover County.

== Election results ==
=== 2024 ===
North Carolina House of Representatives 20th district general election, 2024
Party	Candidate	Votes	%
Republican	Ted Davis Jr. (incumbent)	31,964	55.80%
Democratic	Jonathan Berger	25,319	44.20%
Total votes		57,283	100%
Republican hold			

=== 2022 ===
North Carolina House of Representatives 20th district general election, 2022
Party	Candidate	Votes	%
Republican	Ted Davis Jr. (incumbent)	19,075	51.14%
Democratic	Amy Block DeLoach	18,228	48.86%
Total votes		37,303	100%
Republican hold			

=== 2020 ===
North Carolina House of Representatives 20th district Republican primary election, 2020
Party	Candidate	Votes	%
Republican	Ted Davis Jr. (incumbent)	6,241	76.52%
Republican	Justin LaNasa	1,915	23.48%
Total votes		8,156	100%

North Carolina House of Representatives 20th district general election, 2020
Party	Candidate	Votes	%
Republican	Ted Davis Jr. (incumbent)	28,119	55.33%
Democratic	Adam Ericson	22,703	44.67%
Total votes		50,822	100%
Republican hold			

=== 2018 ===
North Carolina House of Representatives 20th district Democratic primary election, 2018
Party	Candidate	Votes	%
Democratic	Leslie Cohen	2,105	47.52%
Democratic	Gary K. Shipman	1,999	45.12%
Democratic	John Bauer	326	7.36%
Total votes		4,430	100%

North Carolina House of Representatives 20th district general election, 2018
Party	Candidate	Votes	%
Republican	Holly Grange (incumbent)	18,979	52.66%
Democratic	Leslie Cohen	17,062	47.34%
Total votes		36,041	100%
Republican hold			

=== 2016 ===
North Carolina House of Representatives 20th district Republican primary election, 2016
Party	Candidate	Votes	%
Republican	Holly Grange	7,188	61.98%
Republican	Tammy Covil	4,409	38.02%
Total votes		11,597	100%

North Carolina House of representavives 20th district general election, 2016
Party	Candidate	Votes	%
Republican	Holly Grange (incumbent)	32,576	100%
Total votes		32,576	100%
Republican hold			

=== 2014 ===
North Carolina House of Representatives 20th district general election, 2014
Party	Candidate	Votes	%
Republican	Rick Catlin (incumbent)	16,844	62.16%
Democratic	Betsy Jordan	10,252	37.84%
Total votes		27,096	100%
Republican hold			

=== 2012 ===
North Carolina House of Representatives 20th district general election, 2012
Party	Candidate	Votes	%
Republican	Rick Catlin	25,282	64.07%
Democratic	Tom Gale	14,179	35.93%
Total votes		39,461	100%
Republican win (new seat)			

=== 2010 ===
North Carolina House of Representatives 20th district Democratic primary election, 2010
Party	Candidate	Votes	%
Democratic	Dewey Hill (incumbent)	3,876	55.75%
Democratic	Ken Waddell	3,077	44.25%
Total votes		6,953	100%

North Carolina House of Representatives 20th district general election, 2010
Party	Candidate	Votes	%
Democratic	Dewey Hill (incumbent)	11,042	53.24%
Republican	Tristan V. Patterson	9,698	46.76%
Total votes		20,740	100%
Democratic hold			

=== 2008 ===
North Carolina House of Representatives 20th district general election, 2008
Party	Candidate	Votes	%
Democratic	Dewey Hill (incumbent)	22,687	100%
Total votes		22,687	100%
Democratic hold			

=== 2006 ===
North Carolina House of Representatives 20th district general election, 2006
Party	Candidate	Votes	%
Democratic	Dewey Hill (incumbent)	10,164	62.78%
Republican	R. C. "Ray" Gilbert	6,026	37.22%
Total votes		16,190	100%
Democratic hold			

=== 2004 ===
North Carolina House of Representatives 20th district Democratic primary election, 2004
Party	Candidate	Votes	%
Democratic	Dewey Hill (incumbent)	4,619	50.07%
Democratic	Richard Wright	4,606	49.93%
Total votes		9,225	100%

North Carolina House of Representatives 20th district general election, 2004
Party	Candidate	Votes	%
Democratic	Dewey Hill (incumbent)	19,158	100%
Total votes		19,158	100%
Democratic hold			

=== 2002 ===
North Carolina House of Representatives 20th district general election, 2002
Party	Candidate	Votes	%
Democratic	Dewey Hill (incumbent)	14,340	82.42%
Libertarian	Richard Hollembeak	3,058	17.58%
Total votes		17,398	100%
Democratic hold			

=== 2000 ===
North Carolina House of Representatives 20th district general election, 2000
Party	Candidate	Votes	%
Republican	Billy Creech (incumbent)	17,023	60.40%
Democratic	Richard Price	11,162	39.60%
Total votes		28,185	100%
Republican hold			
