= Billy J. Creech =

American politician from North Carolina (born 1943)

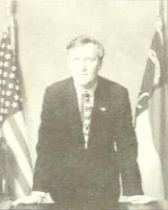
Creech in the 2001 legislative manual

Billy James Creech (born March 25, 1943) is a former Republican member of the North Carolina General Assembly representing the state's twenty-sixth House district, including constituents in Johnston and Wayne counties. A businessman from Clayton, North Carolina, Creech served eight terms in the state House.

In 2002, after redistricting put Creech in the same NC House district as fellow Republican Leo Daughtry, Creech declined to run again for the NC House. Instead, he ran for United States Congress in North Carolina's 2nd congressional district in 2004. Creech won the Republican Primary easily, but lost the general election to incumbent congressman Bob Etheridge.

North Carolina House of Representatives
Preceded by George Wyatt Brannan	Member of the North Carolina House of Representatives from the 20th district 1989–2003; Served alongside: Barney Paul Woodard (1989–1993)	Succeeded by Dewey Hill
Preceded by Alma Adams	Member of the North Carolina House of Representatives from the 26th district 2003–2005	Succeeded by Leo Daughtry
