= Keith P. Williams =

American politician

Keith Williams

Member of the North Carolina House of Representatives from the 14th district
- In office January 1, 2003 – January 1, 2005
- Preceded by: Constituency established
- Succeeded by: George Cleveland

Personal details
- Party: Republican

Keith Parker Williams was a Republican member of the North Carolina General Assembly representing the state's fourteenth House district, including constituents in Onslow county. A real estate broker and developer from Hubert, North Carolina, Williams served one term (2003-2004 session) in the state House.

North Carolina House of Representatives
Preceded by David Redwine; Dewey Hill	Member of the North Carolina House of Representatives from the 14th district 2003–2005	Succeeded by George Cleveland
