= N. Leo Daughtry =

American politician

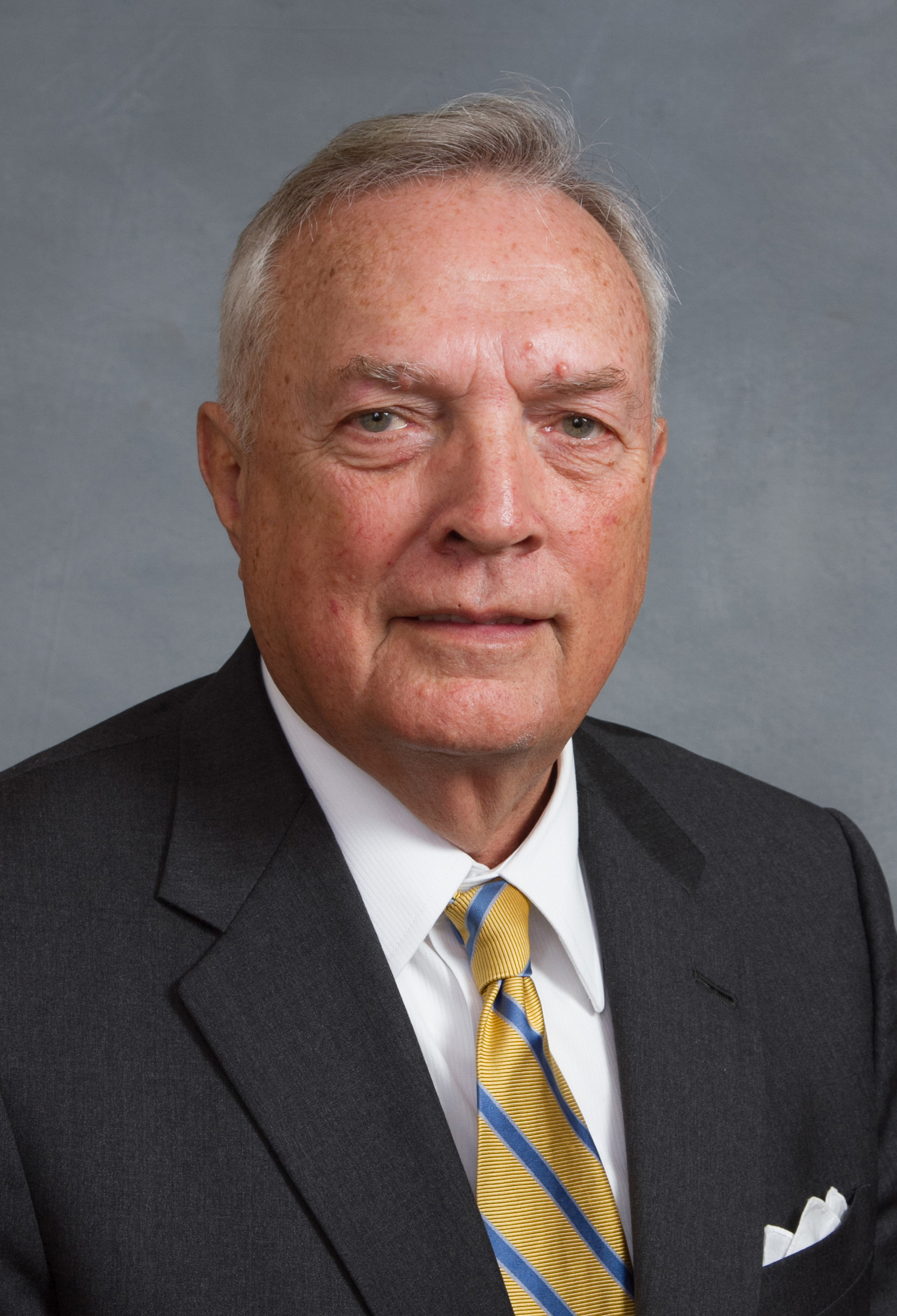

Member of the North Carolina House of Representatives
- In office January 1, 1993 – January 1, 2017
- Preceded by: Billy Creech; Barney Paul Woodard (Redistricting)
- Succeeded by: Donna McDowell White
- Constituency: 95th District (1993-2003); 28th District (2003-2005); 26th District (2005-2017)

Member of the North Carolina Senate from the 15th district
- In office January 1, 1989 – January 1, 1993
- Preceded by: Robert Warren Sr.
- Succeeded by: Elaine Marshall

Personal details
- Born: Namon Leo Daughtry; December 3, 1940 (age 85) Newton Grove, North Carolina, U.S.
- Party: Republican
- Spouse: Helen Daughtry
- Education: Wake Forest University (BA, LLB)
- Occupation: Attorney

Namon Leo Daughtry (born December 3, 1940) is a former Republican member of the North Carolina General Assembly representing the state's twenty-sixth House district, including constituents in Johnston County, North Carolina. An attorney from Smithfield, North Carolina, Daughtry served in the state House since 1995. He previously served two terms in the state Senate.

== Early life and education ==
Daughtry was born in Newton Grove, North Carolina on December 3, 1940.

He would graduate from Wake Forest University with a Bachelor of Arts degree in 1962 and go on to receive his L.L.B. from the same university's School of Law in 1965.

== Military service ==
- Captain, Judge Advocate General, United States Air Force; 1966–69

== Political career ==
Daughtry served in the North Carolina Senate from 1989 through 1993. He was elected to the state House in 1992, where he was elected Majority Leader in his first term. After Republicans lost control of the House in the 1998 elections, he became Minority Leader. The 2008 election is the only race when he has faced an opponent. Daughtry was a candidate for Governor of North Carolina in the 2000 election, losing the primary to Richard Vinroot.

He has been a Delegate to the Republican National Conventions of 1976, 1980, 1984, 1988, 1992, and 1996.

Currently, Daughtry serves on the University of North Carolina Board of Governors.

=== Election results ===
==== 2014 ====
North Carolina House of Representatives 26th district Republican primary election, 2014
Party	Candidate	Votes	%
Republican	Leo Daughtry (incumbent)	3,426	73.16%
Republican	Dennis Nielsen	1,257	26.84%
Total votes		4,683	100%

North Carolina House of Representatives 26th district general election, 2014
Party	Candidate	Votes	%
Republican	Leo Daughtry (incumbent)	18,754	100%
Total votes		18,754	100%
Republican hold			

==== 2012 ====
North Carolina House of Representatives 26th district general election, 2012
Party	Candidate	Votes	%
Republican	Leo Daughtry (incumbent)	23,125	59.67%
Democratic	Jenifer Bubenik	15,633	40.33%
Total votes		38,758	100%
Republican hold			

==== 2010 ====
North Carolina House of Representatives 26th district general election, 2010
Party	Candidate	Votes	%
Republican	Leo Daughtry (incumbent)	18,941	100%
Total votes		18,941	100%
Republican hold			

==== 2008 ====
North Carolina House of Representatives 26th district general election, 2008
Party	Candidate	Votes	%
Republican	Leo Daughtry (incumbent)	21,709	54.72%
Democratic	Jimmy F. Garner	17,964	45.28%
Total votes		39,673	100%
Republican hold			

==== 2006 ====
North Carolina House of Representatives 26th district general election, 2006
Party	Candidate	Votes	%
Republican	Leo Daughtry (incumbent)	12,169	100%
Total votes		12,169	100%
Republican hold			

==== 2004 ====
North Carolina House of Representatives 26th district general election, 2004
Party	Candidate	Votes	%
Republican	Leo Daughtry (incumbent)	20,320	100%
Total votes		20,320	100%
Republican hold			

==== 2002 ====
North Carolina House of Representatives 28th district general election, 2002
Party	Candidate	Votes	%
Republican	Leo Daughtry (incumbent)	15,833	100%
Total votes		15,833	100%
Republican hold			

==== 2000 ====
North Carolina House of Representatives 95th district general election, 2000
Party	Candidate	Votes	%
Republican	Leo Daughtry (incumbent)	15,511	60.87%
Democratic	Jim Johnson	9,972	39.13%
Total votes		25,483	100%
Republican hold			

== Civic activities ==
- Board of Directors, Community Foundation

== Awards ==
- 1996–97; Celebrity of the Year Award; Johnston County Schools
- 1996; Man of the Year; Boy Scouts of America
- 1995; Man of the Year; Johnston County Chamber of Commerce

North Carolina Senate
Preceded by Robert Warren Sr.	Member of the North Carolina Senate from the 15th district 1989–1993	Succeeded by Elaine Marshall
North Carolina House of Representatives
Preceded by Constituency established	Member of the North Carolina House of Representatives from the 95th district 1993–2003	Succeeded by Karen Ray
Preceded by Flossie Boyd-Mcintyre	Member of the North Carolina House of Representatives from the 28th district 2003–2005	Succeeded by James Langdon Jr.
Preceded by Billy Creech	Member of the North Carolina House of Representatives from the 26th district 2005–2017	Succeeded by Donna McDowell White
