= North Carolina's 14th House district =

American legislative district

North Carolina's 14th State House of Representatives district
Representative
Wyatt Gable; R–Jacksonville
- Demographics: 60% White; 12% Black; 17% Hispanic; 2% Asian; 1% Native American; 8% Multiracial
- Population (2024): 88,540

North Carolina's 14th House district is one of 120 districts in the North Carolina House of Representatives. It has been represented by Republican Wyatt Gable since 2025.

== Geography ==
Since 2003, the district has included part of Onslow County. The district overlaps with the 6th Senate district.

== District officeholders ==
=== Multi-member district ===
Representative	Party	Dates	Notes	Representative	Party	Dates	Notes	Representative	Party	Dates	Notes	Counties
District created January 1, 1967.
Julian Fenner (Rocky Mount)	Democratic	January 1, 1967 – January 1, 1973	Redistricted to the 7th district.	Allen Barbee (Spring Hope)	Democratic	January 1, 1967 – January 1, 1973	Redistricted from the Nash County district. Redistricted to the 7th district and retired to run for Lieutenant Governor.	Joe Eagles (Macclesfield)	Democratic	January 1, 1967 – January 1, 1971	Redistricted from the Edgecombe County district.	1967–1973; All of Nash and Edgecombe counties.
Julian Fenner (Rocky Mount)	Democratic	January 1, 1967 – January 1, 1973	Redistricted to the 7th district.	Allen Barbee (Spring Hope)	Democratic	January 1, 1967 – January 1, 1973	Redistricted from the Nash County district. Redistricted to the 7th district and retired to run for Lieutenant Governor.	Larry Eagles (Tarboro)	Democratic	January 1, 1971 – January 1, 1973	Redistricted to the 7th district.	1967–1973; All of Nash and Edgecombe counties.
Jack Gardner (Smithfield)	Democratic	January 1, 1973 – January 1, 1979	Redistricted from the 15th district.	Barney Paul Woodard (Princeton)	Democratic	January 1, 1973 – January 1, 1981						1973–1983; All of Franklin and Johnston counties.
Robert Hobgood (Louisburg)	Democratic	January 1, 1979 – January 1, 1981		Barney Paul Woodard (Princeton)	Democratic	January 1, 1973 – January 1, 1981						1973–1983; All of Franklin and Johnston counties.
Jack Gardner (Smithfield)	Democratic	January 1, 1981 – January 14, 1981	Died.	John Radford (Selma)	Democratic	January 1, 1981 – January 1, 1983						1973–1983; All of Franklin and Johnston counties.
Vacant		January 14, 1981 – January 28, 1981		John Radford (Selma)	Democratic	January 1, 1981 – January 1, 1983						1973–1983; All of Franklin and Johnston counties.
George Brannan (Smithfield)	Democratic	January 28, 1981 – January 1, 1983	Appointed to finish Gardner's term. Redistricted to the 20th district.	John Radford (Selma)	Democratic	January 1, 1981 – January 1, 1983						1973–1983; All of Franklin and Johnston counties.

=== Single-member district ===
Representative	Party	Dates	Notes	Counties
Tom Rabon Jr. (Winnabow)	Democratic	January 1, 1983 – January 1, 1985	Redistricted from the 11th district.	1983–1993; All of Brunswick County. Parts of New Hanover and Pender counties.
David Redwine (Ocean Isle Beach)	Democratic	January 1, 1985 – January 1, 1993	Redistricted to the multi-member district.	1983–1993; All of Brunswick County. Parts of New Hanover and Pender counties.

=== Multi-member district ===
Representative	Party	Dates	Notes	Representative	Party	Dates	Notes	Counties
David Redwine (Ocean Isle Beach)	Democratic	January 1, 1993 – January 1, 2003	Redistricted from the single-member district. Redistricted to the 17th district and lost re-election.	Dewey Hill (Lake Waccamaw)	Democratic	January 1, 1993 – January 1, 2003	Redistricted to the 20th district.	1993–2003; Parts of Robeson, Columbus, Brunswick, and New Hanover counties.

=== Single-member district ===
Representative	Party	Dates	Notes	Counties
Keith Williams (Hubert)	Republican	January 1, 2003 – January 1, 2005	Lost re-nomination.	2003–Present; Parts of Onslow County.
George Cleveland (Jacksonvile)	Republican	January 1, 2005 – January 1, 2025	Lost re-nomination.	2003–Present; Parts of Onslow County.
Wyatt Gable (Jacksonville)	Republican	January 1, 2025 – Present		2003–Present; Parts of Onslow County.

== Election results ==
=== 2024 ===
North Carolina House of Representatives 14th district Republican primary election, 2024
Party	Candidate	Votes	%
Republican	Wyatt Gable	2,467	50.98%
Republican	George Cleveland (incumbent)	2,372	49.02%
Total votes		4,839	100%

North Carolina House of Representatives 14th district general election, 2024
Party	Candidate	Votes	%
Republican	Wyatt Gable	16,859	66.12%
Democratic	Carmen Spicer	8,639	33.88%
Total votes		25,498	100%
Republican hold			

=== 2022 ===
North Carolina House of Representatives 14th district Democratic primary election, 2022
Party	Candidate	Votes	%
Democratic	Isiah (Ike) Johnson	1,321	84.46%
Democratic	Eric Whitfield	243	15.54%
Total votes		1,564	100%

North Carolina House of Representatives 14th district general election, 2022
Party	Candidate	Votes	%
Republican	George Cleveland (incumbent)	9,418	66.21%
Democratic	Isiah "Ike" Johnson	4,807	33.79%
Total votes		14,225	100%
Republican hold			

=== 2020 ===
North Carolina House of Representatives 14th district Republican primary election, 2020
Party	Candidate	Votes	%
Republican	George Cleveland (incumbent)	4,112	67.60%
Republican	Cindy Edwards	1,971	32.40%
Total votes		6,083	100%

North Carolina House of Representatives 14th district general election, 2020
Party	Candidate	Votes	%
Republican	George Cleveland (incumbent)	19,666	60.02%
Democratic	Marcy Wofford	13,100	39.98%
Total votes		32,266	100%
Republican hold			

=== 2018 ===
North Carolina House of Representatives 14th district Republican primary election, 2018
Party	Candidate	Votes	%
Republican	George Cleveland (incumbent)	2,122	52.54%
Republican	Joseph R. McLaughlin	1,917	47.46%
Total votes		4,039	100%

North Carolina House of Representatives 14th district general election, 2018
Party	Candidate	Votes	%
Republican	George Cleveland (incumbent)	10,544	58.82%
Democratic	Isiah (Ike) Johnson	7,381	41.18%
Total votes		17,295	100%
Republican hold			

=== 2016 ===
North Carolina House of Representatives 14th district general election, 2016
Party	Candidate	Votes	%
Republican	George Cleveland (incumbent)	18,908	100%
Total votes		18,908	100%
Republican hold			

=== 2014 ===
North Carolina House of Representatives 14th district Republican primary election, 2014
Party	Candidate	Votes	%
Republican	George Cleveland (incumbent)	3,051	55.22%
Republican	Bobby Mills	2,474	44.78%
Total votes		5,525	100%

North Carolina House of Representatives 14th district general election, 2014
Party	Candidate	Votes	%
Republican	George Cleveland (incumbent)	10,740	100%
Total votes		10,740	100%
Republican hold			

=== 2012 ===
North Carolina House of Representatives 14th district general election, 2012
Party	Candidate	Votes	%
Republican	George Cleveland (incumbent)	15,861	100%
Total votes		15,861	100%
Republican hold			

=== 2010 ===
North Carolina House of Representatives 14th district general election, 2010
Party	Candidate	Votes	%
Republican	George Cleveland (incumbent)	8,961	100%
Total votes		8,961	100%
Republican hold			

=== 2008 ===
North Carolina House of Representatives 14th district Republican primary election, 2008
Party	Candidate	Votes	%
Republican	George Cleveland (incumbent)	1,930	55.86%
Republican	Martin Aragona Jr.	1,525	44.14%
Total votes		3,455	100%

North Carolina House of Representatives 14th district general election, 2008
Party	Candidate	Votes	%
Republican	George Cleveland (incumbent)	16,926	100%
Total votes		16,926	100%
Republican hold			

=== 2006 ===
North Carolina House of Representatives 14th district Democratic primary election, 2006
Party	Candidate	Votes	%
Democratic	Kever M. Clark	600	59.11%
Democratic	Edgar A. Midgett Sr.	415	40.89%
Total votes		1,015	100%

North Carolina House of Representatives 14th district Republican primary election, 2006
Party	Candidate	Votes	%
Republican	George Cleveland (incumbent)	533	54.78%
Republican	Keith Williams	440	45.22%
Total votes		973	100%

North Carolina House of Representatives 14th district general election, 2006
Party	Candidate	Votes	%
Republican	George Cleveland (incumbent)	5,238	58.05%
Democratic	Kever M. Clark	3,785	41.95%
Total votes		9,023	100%
Republican hold			

=== 2004 ===
North Carolina House of Representatives 14th district Republican primary election, 2004
Party	Candidate	Votes	%
Republican	George Cleveland	1,182	53.92%
Republican	Keith Williams (incumbent)	1,010	46.08%
Total votes		2,192	100%

North Carolina House of Representatives 14th district general election, 2004
Party	Candidate	Votes	%
Republican	George Cleveland	11,479	60.78%
Democratic	Kever M. Clark	7,406	39.22%
Total votes		18,885	100%
Republican hold			

=== 2002 ===
North Carolina House of Representatives 14th district Democratic primary election, 2002
Party	Candidate	Votes	%
Democratic	Dolores Jones Faison	1,375	51.13%
Democratic	Harry Brown	1,314	48.87%
Total votes		2,689	100%

North Carolina House of Representatives 14th district Republican primary election, 2002
Party	Candidate	Votes	%
Republican	Keith Williams	791	52.56%
Republican	George Cleveland	714	47.44%
Total votes		1,505	100%

North Carolina House of Representatives 14th district general election, 2002
Party	Candidate	Votes	%
Republican	Keith Williams	4,325	54.48%
Democratic	Dolores Jones Faison	3,410	42.95%
Libertarian	Cap Hayes	204	2.57%
Total votes		7,939	100%
Republican win (new seat)			

=== 2000 ===
North Carolina House of Representatives 14th district general election, 2000
Party	Candidate	Votes	%
Democratic	David Redwine (incumbent)	27,742	29.51%
Democratic	Dewey Hill (incumbent)	25,763	27.41%
Republican	William A. "Bill" Caster	22,791	24.25%
Republican	Robert "Bob" Quinn	17,701	18.83%
Total votes		93,997	100%
Democratic hold			
Democratic hold			
