= Ike Franklin Andrews =

American politician from North Carolina (1925–2010)

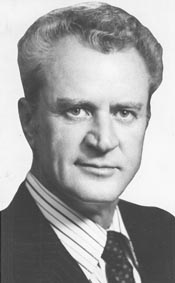

Member of the U.S. House of Representatives from North Carolina's 4th district
- In office January 3, 1973 – January 3, 1985
- Preceded by: Nick Galifianakis
- Succeeded by: Bill Cobey

Member of the North Carolina House of Representatives
- In office 1967–1973 Serving with Donald McIver Stanford, Carl Maneval Smith
- Preceded by: Constituency established
- Succeeded by: Norwood Bryan Jr. Lewis Sneed High; Glenn Reginald Jernigan; Lura Self Tally; Henry McMillan Tyson
- Constituency: 20th District
- In office 1961–1963
- Preceded by: Harry Perryman Horton
- Succeeded by: Jack Arthur Moody
- Constituency: Chatham County

Member of the North Carolina Senate from the 13th district
- In office 1959–1961 Serving with John Richard Jordan Jr.
- Preceded by: James Womble Hoyle; James M. Poyner
- Succeeded by: James Womble Hoyle

Personal details
- Born: September 2, 1925 Bonlee, North Carolina, U.S.
- Died: May 10, 2010 (aged 84) Chapel Hill, North Carolina, U.S.
- Party: Democratic
- Education: University of North Carolina, Chapel Hill (BS, LLB)
- Profession: Politician, soldier, lawyer
- Awards: Bronze Star; Purple Heart

Military service
- Branch/service: United States Army
- Years of service: 1943–1945
- Rank: Master Sergeant
- Battles/wars: World War II

Ike Franklin Andrews (September 2, 1925 – May 10, 2010) was an American politician. He served as a Democratic U.S. Congressman from North Carolina's Fourth Congressional District between 1973 and 1985, when he was defeated for reelection by Republican Bill Cobey.

== Biography ==
Born in Bonlee, North Carolina, Andrews attended local public schools and the Fork Union Military Academy. After his graduation in 1942, he served in the United States Army during World War II as a field artillery forward observer, between 1943 and 1945. During his military service, he attained the rank of Master Sergeant, received the Bronze Star and Purple Heart.

After the war, Andrews studied at the University of North Carolina at Chapel Hill, earning his bachelor's degree in 1950 and a law degree in 1952. He practiced law in Pittsboro, North Carolina, and was elected to the North Carolina State Senate in 1959. Andrews was later elected to the North Carolina House of Representatives in 1961, 1967, 1969, and 1971. In 1972, Andrews was elected to his first of six terms in the U.S. House. A Democrat, he served from January 3, 1973, to January 3, 1985, before being defeated for re-election in 1984. North Carolina House Speaker Joe Hackney was at one time his son-in-law, and also served as his 1974 campaign manager.

North Carolina Senate
Preceded by James Womble Hoyle; James M. Poyner	Member of the North Carolina Senate from the 13th district 1959–1961; Served alongside: John Richard Jordan Jr.	Succeeded by James Womble Hoyle
North Carolina House of Representatives
Preceded by Harry Perryman Horton	Member of the North Carolina House of Representatives from Chatham County; 1961–1963	Succeeded by Jack Arthur Moody
Preceded by Constituency established	Member of the North Carolina House of Representatives from the 20th district 1967–1973; Served alongside: Donald McIver Stanford, Carl Maneval Smith	Succeeded by Norwood Bryan Jr. Lewis Sneed High; Glenn Reginald Jernigan; Lura Self Tally; Henry McMillan Tyson
U.S. House of Representatives
Preceded by Nick Galifianakis	Member of the U.S. House of Representatives from North Carolina's 4th congressional district 1973–1985	Succeeded by Bill Cobey
