= Donna McDowell White =

American politician from North Carolina

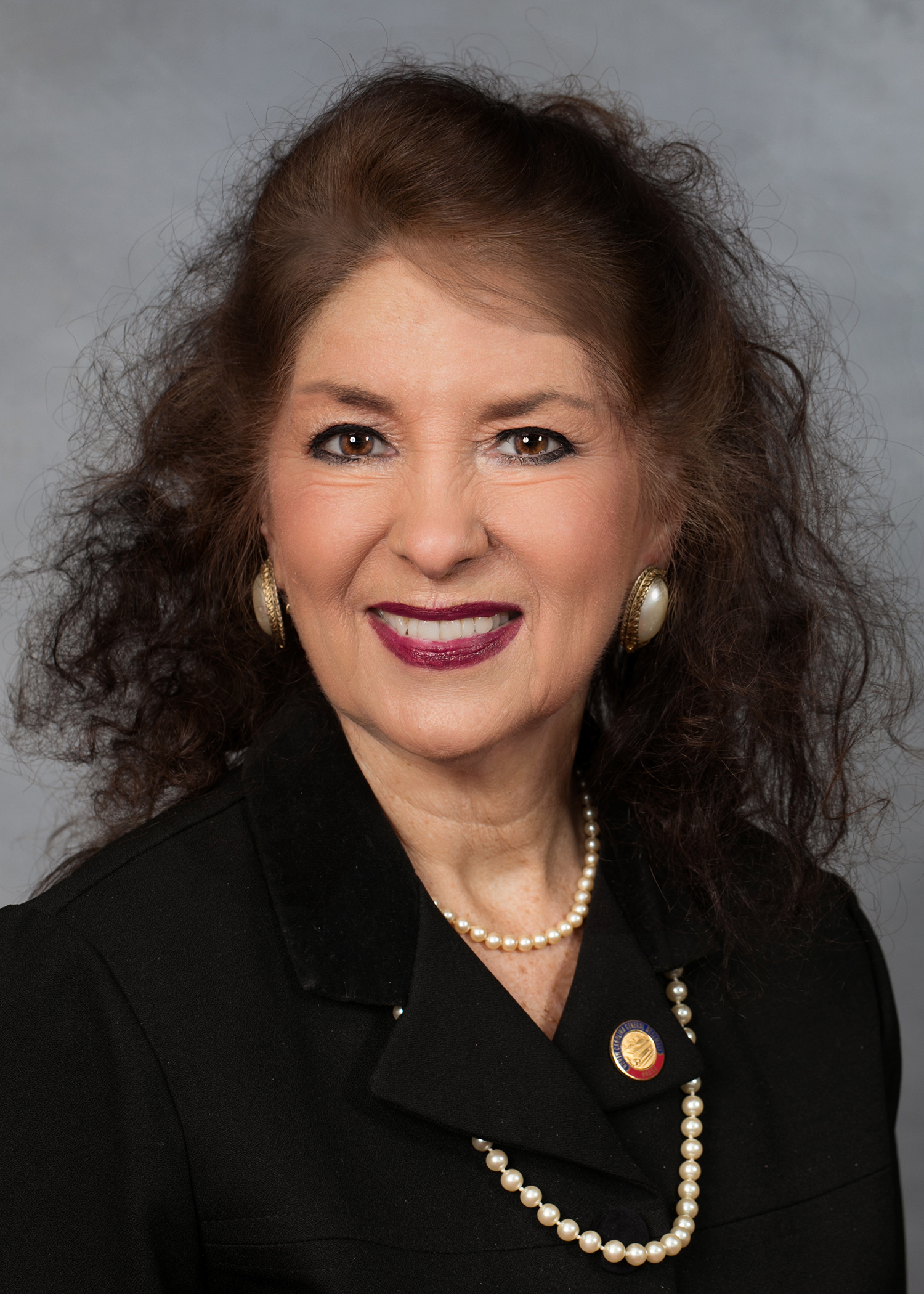

Member of the North Carolina House of Representatives from the 26th district
- Incumbent
- Assumed office January 1, 2017
- Preceded by: Leo Daughtry

Personal details
- Born: Donna Marie McDowell; November 29, 1948 (age 77) Southport, North Carolina, U.S.
- Party: Republican
- Children: 2
- Education: Watts School of Nursing (RN)
- Occupation: Aging and Health Specialist, former nurse
- Website: Official website

Donna Marie McDowell White (born November 29, 1948) is an American politician. She was elected to the North Carolina House of Representatives in 2016. A Republican, she has represented the 26th district (including constituents in Northern Johnston County) since 2017.

== Electoral history ==
=== 2020 ===
North Carolina House of Representatives 26th district Republican primary election, 2020
Party	Candidate	Votes	%
Republican	Donna McDowell White (incumbent)	7,110	72.51%
Republican	Justin Tate	2,695	27.49%
Total votes		9,805	100%

North Carolina House of Representatives 26th district general election, 2020
Party	Candidate	Votes	%
Republican	Donna McDowell White (incumbent)	33,495	53.67%
Democratic	Linda Bennett	21,689	34.75%
Unaffaliated	Denton Lee	7,227	11.58%
Total votes		62,411	100%
Republican hold			

=== 2018 ===
North Carolina House of Representatives 26th district general election, 2018
Party	Candidate	Votes	%
Republican	Donna McDowell White (incumbent)	22,770	59.84%
Democratic	Linda Bennett	15,283	40.16%
Total votes		38,053	100%
Republican hold			

=== 2016 ===
North Carolina House of Representatives 26th district Republican primary election, 2016
Party	Candidate	Votes	%
Republican	Donna McDowell White	6,009	59.53%
Republican	Dennis Nielsen	4,085	40.47%
Total votes		10,094	100%

North Carolina House of Representatives 26th district general election, 2016
Party	Candidate	Votes	%
Republican	Donna McDowell White	25,899	58.05%
Democratic	Rich Nixon	18,716	41.95%
Total votes		44,615	100%
Republican hold			

== Committee assignments ==
=== 2021-2022 Session ===
- Appropriations (Vice Chair)
- Appropriations - Health and Human Services Committee (Chair)
- Health (Chair)
- Families, Children, and Aging Policy
- Education - K-12
- Environment

=== 2019-2020 Session ===
- Appropriations (Vice Chair)
- Appropriations - Health and Human Services (Chair)
- Health (Chair)
- Families, Children, and Aging Policy
- Education - K-12
- Environment

=== 2017-2018 Session ===
- Appropriations
- Appropriations - Health and Human Services
- Health
- Aging
- Education - K-12
- Ethics
- Judiciary III

North Carolina House of Representatives
Preceded by Leo Daughtry	Member of the North Carolina House of Representatives from the 26th district 2017–Present	Incumbent
