= Wyatt Gable =

American politician from North Carolina (born 2002)

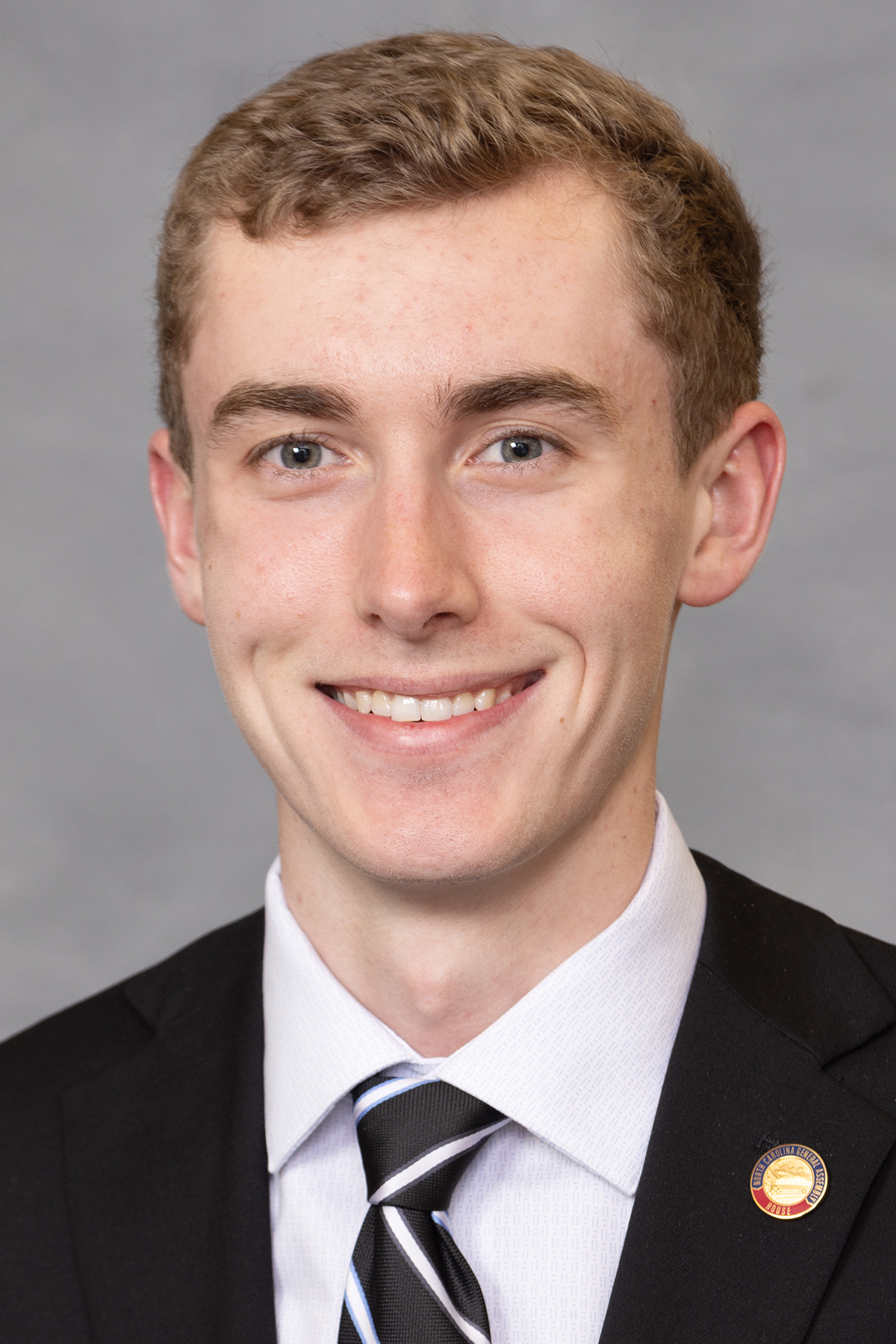

Member of the North Carolina House of Representatives from the 14th district
- Incumbent
- Assumed office January 1, 2025
- Preceded by: George Cleveland

Personal details
- Born: September 30, 2002 (age 23)
- Party: Republican

Wyatt Walter Gable (born September 30, 2002) is an American politician who has served as a member of the North Carolina House of Representatives for the 14th district since 2025. A member of the Republican Party, he defeated 10-term incumbent George Cleveland in the primary. He is a student at East Carolina University.

Gable describes himself as a "big Trump supporter".

Gable is the president of the East Carolina chapter of Turning Point USA, runs track, and plays intramural sports.

== Committee Assignments ==
=== 2025-2026 Session ===
- Appropriations
- Appropriations - Education
- Higher Education
- Homeland Security and Military and Veterans Affairs
- Select Committee on Government Efficiency
- Housing and Development

== Electoral history ==
=== 2024 ===
North Carolina House of Representatives 14th district Republican primary election, 2024
Party	Candidate	Votes	%
Republican	Wyatt Gable	2,467	50.98%
Republican	George Cleveland (incumbent)	2,372	49.02%
Total votes		4,839	100%

North Carolina House of Representatives 14th district general election, 2024
Party	Candidate	Votes	%
Republican	Wyatt Gable	16,859	66.12%
Democratic	Carmen Spicer	8,639	33.88%
Total votes		25,498	100%
Republican hold			

North Carolina House of Representatives
Preceded by George Cleveland	Member of the North Carolina House of Representatives from the 14th district 2025–Present	Incumbent
