= Holly Grange =

American politician

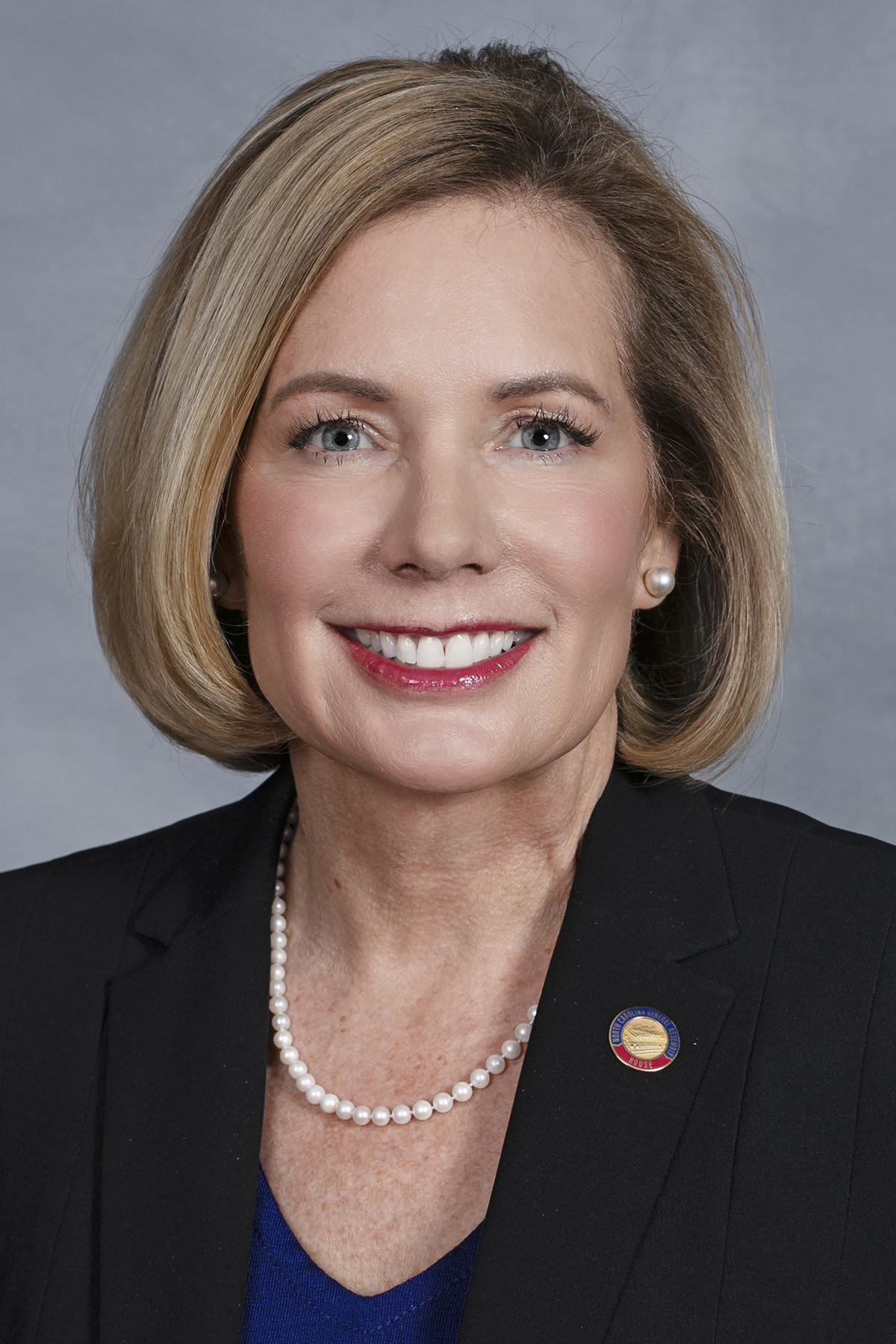

Member of the North Carolina House of Representatives from the 20th district
- In office August 29, 2016 – January 1, 2021
- Preceded by: Rick Catlin
- Succeeded by: Ted Davis Jr.

Personal details
- Born: Holly Elizabeth Getz
- Party: Republican
- Spouse: David
- Children: 2
- Education: United States Military Academy (BS); University of Southern California (MS); Northern Illinois University College of Law (JD)

Holly Grange is an American politician from the state of North Carolina. A Republican, she is a former member of the North Carolina House of Representatives for District 20.

== Career ==
Born to a military family, Grange completed high school in Fayetteville, North Carolina near Fort Bragg. She graduated from the United States Military Academy in 1982, earning a Bachelor of Science, and served in the United States Army Corps of Engineers for nine years. Grange earned an M.S. degree in systems management from the University of Southern California in 1988. After leaving active duty, she served in the United States Army Reserve, where she was assigned to Fort Bragg. Her family settled in Illinois, where she attended law school at the Northern Illinois University College of Law from 2003 to 2006. After earning her Juris Doctor, she practiced law in Illinois until 2009, when her family moved to Wilmington, North Carolina.

Grange was appointed to the board of directors for the North Carolina Ports Authority in 2014. When incumbent state representative Rick Catlin opted not to run for reelection in 2016, Grange ran for his seat. After Catlin resigned on August 15, Grange, who was running unopposed in the November election, was appointed to the seat. She was reelected in 2016 and 2018. The American Conservative Union gave her an 84% evaluation in 2017.

In August 2019, Grange announced her candidacy for governor of North Carolina in the 2020 North Carolina gubernatorial election. She was defeated by Lieutenant Governor Dan Forest in the Republican Party primary election, held on March 3, 2020.

== Personal life ==
Grange is the daughter of Army Brigadier General Charles Edward Getz (1936–2018) and Mary Jane (McNulty) Getz (1938–2016). Her father was a 1959 West Point graduate and Vietnam veteran who earned the Distinguished Service Cross, six Silver Stars and numerous other awards for combat valor.

Her husband, David L. Grange, served in the Army for 30 years. They have two sons. She was previously married to her West Point classmate Wesley E. Farmer Jr.

North Carolina House of Representatives
Preceded by Rick Catlin	Member of the North Carolina House of Representatives from the 20th District; 2016–2021	Succeeded by Ted Davis Jr.
