= George G. Cleveland =

American politician (born 1939)

George Cleveland
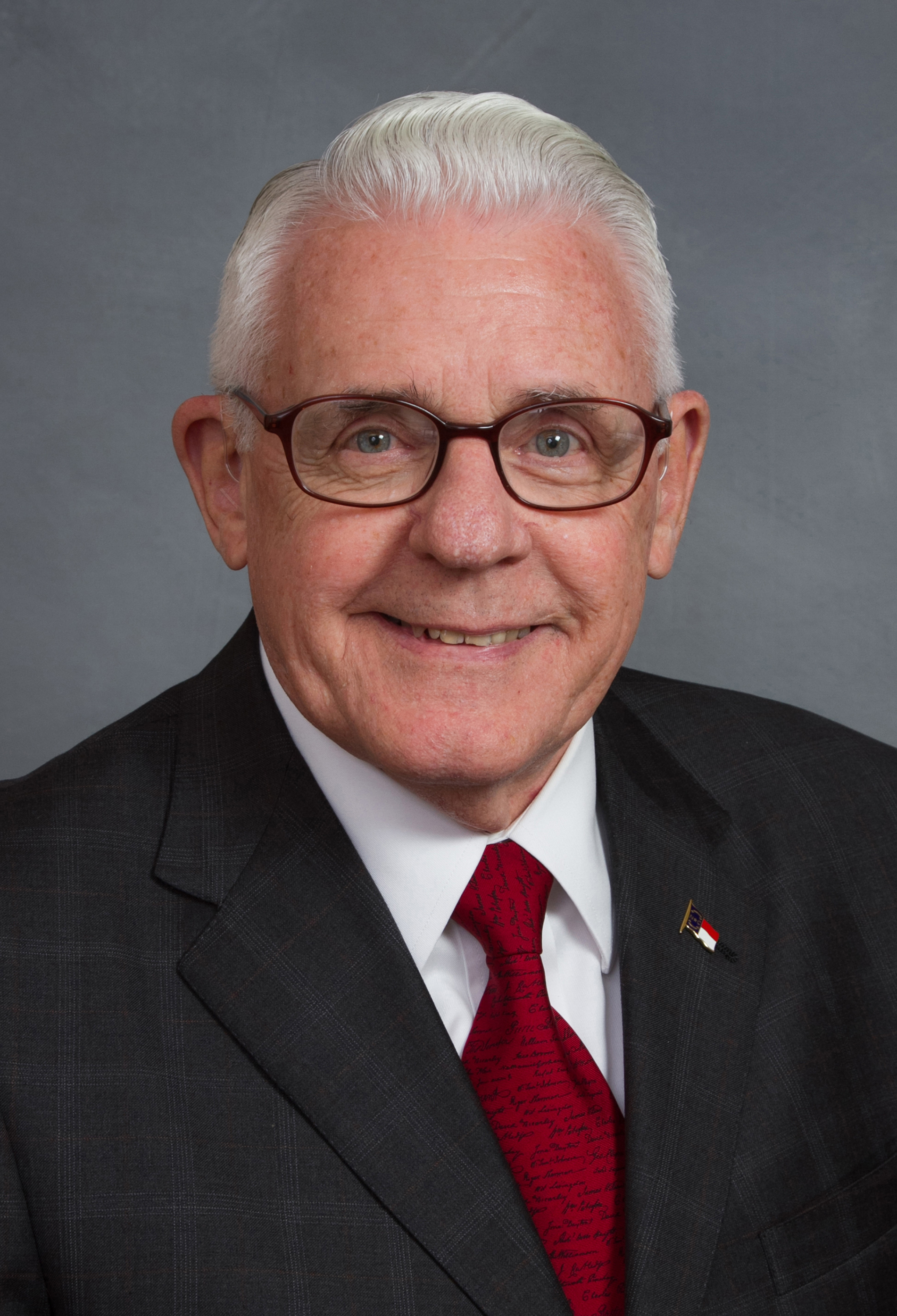

Member of the North Carolina House of Representatives from the 14th district
- In office January 1, 2005 – January 1, 2025
- Preceded by: Keith Williams
- Succeeded by: Wyatt Gable

Personal details
- Born: George Grant Cleveland; May 9, 1939 (age 87) Scranton, Pennsylvania
- Party: Republican
- Spouse: Nancy Leatherman Cleveland
- Children: 4
- Education: University of Maryland, College Park (BS)

George Grant Cleveland (born May 9, 1939), is a former Republican member of the North Carolina House of Representatives. He represented the 14th District (including constituents in eastern Onslow County) from 2005 to 2025. He is a 25-year veteran of the United States Marine Corps.

He currently resides in Jacksonville, North Carolina, where he has lived for over 25 years. In 2012, Cleveland generated controversy when he stated that the state of North Carolina has "no one in the state of North Carolina living in extreme poverty" during a debate in the House regarding preschool funding. In a conflicting statement, the non-profit group Action for Children in North Carolina cited statistics claiming one in ten North Carolina children live in extreme poverty.

== North Carolina House of Representatives ==
Cleveland first ran for the North Carolina House of Representatives in 2004, where he defeated incumbent Keith Williams in the Republican primary. He has been re-elected a total of 8 times, most recently in 2020. He was defeated for re-election in the 2024 primary by college student Wyatt Gable, who was just over one-quarter of his age.

In February 2017, Cleveland joined with Representatives Michael Speciale (R-Craven), and Larry Pittman (R-Cabarrus) in proposing a constitutional amendment that would allow North Carolina voters to repeal Article I, Section 4 of the North Carolina Constitution. This article declares "This State shall ever remain a member of the American Union; the people thereof are part of the American nation," and prohibits the state from seceding from the United States of America, and its inclusion in North Carolina's 1868 constitution was a condition for being readmitted into the Union after the Civil War.

During the 2017 session, Cleveland introduced a bill to budget the funds to purchase for the North Carolina State Highway Patrol three rescue helicopters.

H.B. 1050 was introduced by Representative Cleveland in 2018. The bill worked to authorize the Department of Military and Veterans Affairs to apply for Federal Funds for the Expansion of Sandhills 4 State Vets Cemetery and Western Carolina State Cemetery.

== Committee assignments ==
=== 2023–2024 session ===
- Appropriations (Vice Chair)
- Appropriations - General Government (Chair)
- Marine Resources and Aqua Culture (Chair)
- Homeland Security, Military, and Veterans Affairs (Vice Chair)
- Transportation (Vice Chair)
- Insurance

=== 2021–2022 session ===
- Appropriations (Vice Chair)
- Appropriations - General Government (Chair)
- Homeland Security, Military, and Veterans Affairs (Vice Chair)
- Marine Resources and Aqua Culture (Vice Chair)
- State Government (Vice Chair)
- Transportation (Vice Chair)
- Insurance

=== 2019–2020 session ===
- Appropriations (Vice Chair)
- Appropriations - General Government Committee (Chair)
- Homeland Security, Military, and Veterans Affairs (Chair)
- House State and Local Government (Vice Chair)
- Transportation (Vice Chair)
- Insurance
- Wildlife Resources

=== 2017–2018 session ===
- Appropriations (Vice Chair)
- Appropriations - General Government (Chair)
- Homeland Security, Military, and Veterans Affairs (Chair)
- Transportation (Vice Chair)
- State and Local Government I
- Wildlife Resources
- Agriculture
- Judiciary IV

=== 2015–2016 session ===
- Appropriations (Vice Chair)
- Appropriations - General Government (Chair)
- Appropriations - Information Technology
- Homeland Security, Military, and Veterans Affairs (Chair)
- Transportation (Vice Chair)
- Local Government
- Wildlife Resources
- Agriculture
- Education - K-12
- Judiciary III

=== 2013–2014 session ===
- Appropriations (Vice Chair)
- Homeland Security, Military, and Veterans Affairs (Chair)
- Transportation (Vice Chair)
- Government
- Agriculture
- Education
- Judiciary

=== 2011–2012 session ===
- Appropriations
- Homeland Security, Military, and Veterans Affairs (Chair)
- Transportation
- Government
- Agriculture
- Education
- Judiciary

=== 2009–2010 session ===
- Appropriations
- Homeland Security, Military, and Veterans Affairs
- Transportation
- Wildlife Resources
- Education

== Electoral history ==
=== 2024 ===
North Carolina House of Representatives 14th district Republican primary election, 2024
Party	Candidate	Votes	%
Republican	Wyatt Gable	2,467	50.98%
Republican	George Cleveland (incumbent)	2,372	49.02%
Total votes		4,839	100%

=== 2022 ===
North Carolina House of Representatives 14th district general election, 2022
Party	Candidate	Votes	%
Republican	George Cleveland (incumbent)	9,418	66.21%
Democratic	Isiah "Ike" Johnson	4,807	33.79%
Total votes		14,225	100%
Republican hold			

=== 2020 ===
In March 2020, Cleveland, R-Onslow, won the Republican nomination to retain the N.C. House District 14 seat with 68% of the vote. He defeated Democrat Mary Wofford in the general election.

North Carolina House of Representatives 14th district Republican primary election, 2020
Party	Candidate	Votes	%
Republican	George Cleveland (incumbent)	4,112	67.60%
Republican	Cindy Edwards	1,971	32.40%
Total votes		6,083	100%

North Carolina House of Representatives 14th district general election, 2020
Party	Candidate	Votes	%
Republican	George Cleveland (incumbent)	19,666	60.02%
Democratic	Marcy Wofford	13,100	39.98%
Total votes		32,266	100%
Republican hold			

=== 2018 ===
In November 2018, Cleveland beat Isaiah Johnson by almost 18 percentage points.

North Carolina House of Representatives 14th district Republican primary election, 2018
Party	Candidate	Votes	%
Republican	George Cleveland (incumbent)	2,122	52.54%
Republican	Joseph R. McLaughlin	1,917	47.46%
Total votes		4,039	100%

North Carolina House of Representatives 14th district general election, 2018
Party	Candidate	Votes	%
Republican	George Cleveland (incumbent)	10,544	58.82%
Democratic	Isaiah (Ike) Johnson	7,381	41.18%
Total votes		17,295	100%
Republican hold			

=== 2016 ===
North Carolina House of Representatives 14th district general election, 2016
Party	Candidate	Votes	%
Republican	George Cleveland (incumbent)	18,908	100%
Total votes		18,908	100%
Republican hold			

=== 2014 ===
North Carolina House of Representatives 14th district Republican primary election, 2014
Party	Candidate	Votes	%
Republican	George Cleveland (incumbent)	3,051	55.22%
Republican	Bobby Mills	2,474	44.78%
Total votes		5,525	100%

North Carolina House of Representatives 14th district general election, 2014
Party	Candidate	Votes	%
Republican	George Cleveland (incumbent)	10,740	100%
Total votes		10,740	100%
Republican hold			

=== 2012 ===
North Carolina House of Representatives 14th district general election, 2012
Party	Candidate	Votes	%
Republican	George Cleveland (incumbent)	15,861	100%
Total votes		15,861	100%
Republican hold			

=== 2010 ===
North Carolina House of Representatives 14th district general election, 2010
Party	Candidate	Votes	%
Republican	George Cleveland (incumbent)	8,961	100%
Total votes		8,961	100%
Republican hold			

=== 2008 ===
North Carolina House of Representatives 14th district Republican primary election, 2008
Party	Candidate	Votes	%
Republican	George Cleveland (incumbent)	1,930	55.86%
Republican	Martin Aragona, Jr.	1,525	44.14%
Total votes		3,455	100%

North Carolina House of Representatives 14th district general election, 2008
Party	Candidate	Votes	%
Republican	George Cleveland (incumbent)	16,926	100%
Total votes		16,926	100%
Republican hold			

=== 2006 ===
North Carolina House of Representatives 14th district Republican primary election, 2006
Party	Candidate	Votes	%
Republican	George Cleveland (incumbent)	533	54.78%
Republican	Keith Williams	440	45.22%
Total votes		973	100%

North Carolina House of Representatives 14th district general election, 2006
Party	Candidate	Votes	%
Republican	George Cleveland (incumbent)	5,238	58.05%
Democratic	Kever M. Clark	3,785	41.95%
Total votes		9,023	100%
Republican hold			

=== 2004 ===
North Carolina House of Representatives 14th district Republican primary election, 2004
Party	Candidate	Votes	%
Republican	George Cleveland	1,182	53.92%
Republican	Keith Williams (incumbent)	1,010	46.08%
Total votes		2,192	100%

North Carolina House of Representatives 14th district general election, 2004
Party	Candidate	Votes	%
Republican	George Cleveland	11,479	60.78%
Democratic	Kever M. Clark	7,406	39.22%
Total votes		18,885	100%
Republican hold			

North Carolina House of Representatives
Preceded by Keith Williams	Member of the North Carolina House of Representatives from the 14th district 2005–2025	Succeeded by Wyatt Gable
