= David L. Grange =

United States Army general (born 1947)

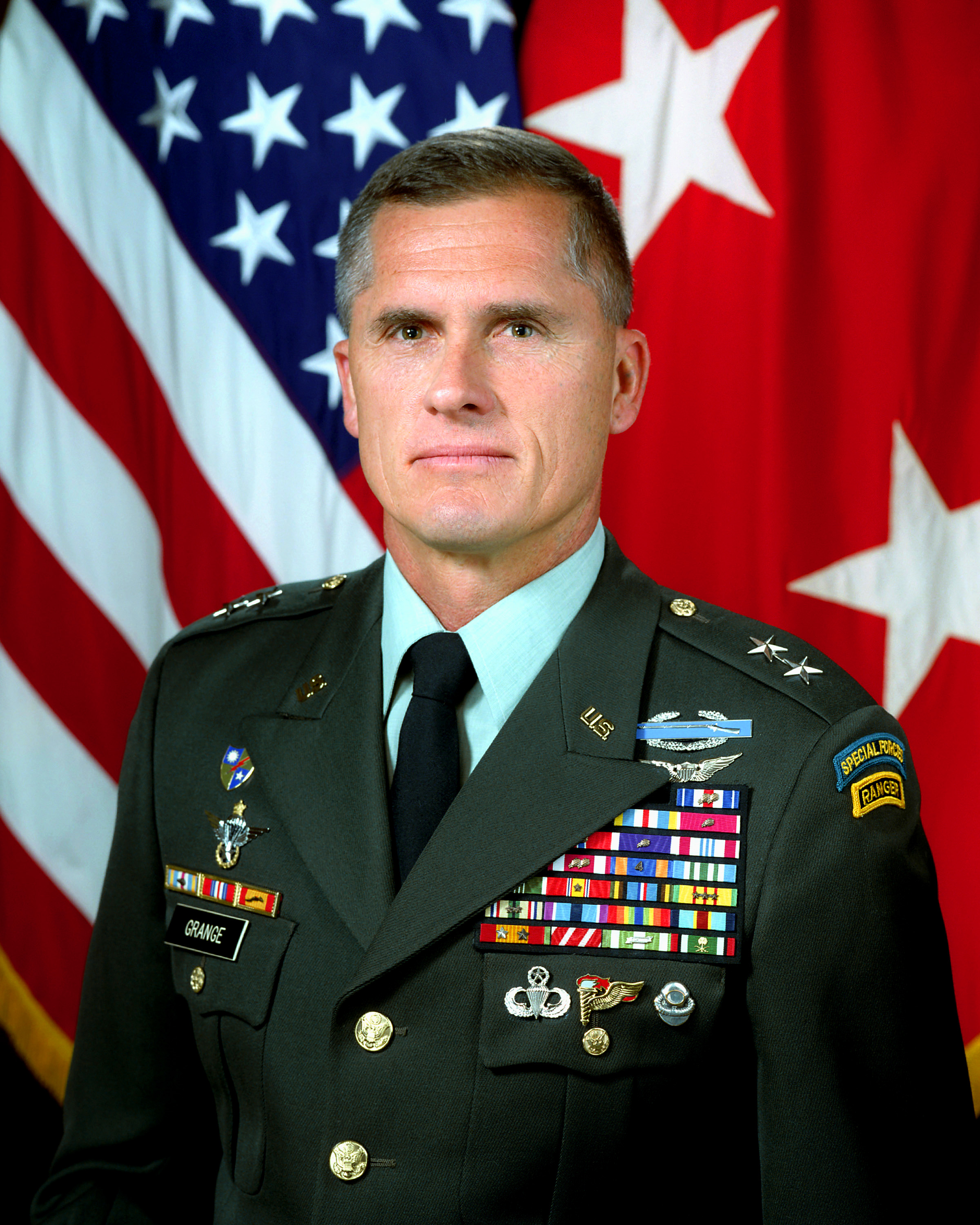
- Major General David L. Grange in 1996
- Born: December 29, 1947 (age 78); Long Island, New York, U.S.
- Spouse: Holly Grange
- Relatives: David E. Grange, Jr. (father)
- Military career
- Allegiance: United States of America
- Branch: United States Army
- Service years: 1969–1999
- Rank: Major General
- Unit: Delta Force
- Commands: 1st Infantry Division; 75th Ranger Regiment; 1st Battalion, 503rd Infantry Regiment
- Conflicts: Vietnam War; Operation Eagle Claw; Invasion of Grenada; Gulf War; Yugoslav Wars
- Awards: Silver Star (3); Defense Superior Service Medal; Legion of Merit (2); Bronze Star Medal (2); Purple Heart (2)
- Other work: Chief Executive Officer of Pharmaceutical Product Development

David L. Grange (born December 29, 1947) is a retired United States Army major general. He served with the 101st Airborne Division during the Vietnam War. He was later assigned to Delta Force, commanding a squadron during the invasion of Grenada and was deputy commander during the Gulf War. His last command was of 1st Infantry Division in Germany before he retired in 1999.

== Early life ==
Born on December 29, 1947, in Long Island, New York, Grange is the son of retired Lieutenant General David E. Grange, Jr. He graduated from North Georgia College with a Bachelor of Science degree and was commissioned a second lieutenant in the infantry. Grange later earned a master's degree in public service from Western Kentucky University.

== Military career ==
Grange was commissioned as an infantry officer in December 1969. Grange first saw significant combat action as a second lieutenant assigned to the 101st Airborne's "Lima" Ranger company in the I Corps Tactical Zone of Vietnam in 1970. This unit was part of the 75th Infantry (Ranger) and attached to the 2/17th Cavalry. As a first lieutenant serving a second tour in Vietnam from 1971 to 1972, Grange was an adviser to the Army of the Republic of Vietnam Airborne Division. Grange was awarded multiple Silver Star awards for heroism in Vietnam, including his third award for gallantry in action in February 1972 while serving with the U.S. Airborne Advisory Detachment. Grange returned to Fort Bragg in 1972 and served with the 3rd Battalion, 5th Special Forces Group as detachment executive officer and detachment commander until 1974. That year, Grange completed Flight training and subsequently served with the 158th Aviation Brigade. From July 1978 to 1980, Grange served as infantry company commander, C Company, 1st Ranger Battalion, 75th Ranger Regiment, which supported Operation Eagle Claw in April 1980. In 1981 Grange completed the grueling British SAS Course at Hereford, England, then attended the Marine Corps Command and Staff College. In 1982, Grange volunteered for and received assignment to the 1st Special Forces Operational Detachment – Delta (1st SFOD-D), or Delta Force at Fort Bragg, North Carolina. Grange commanded B Squadron during the invasion of Grenada in October 1983 followed by service as unit operations officer. In 1987 Grange volunteered for service in South Korea and took command of the 1st Battalion, 503rd Infantry Regiment, 2nd Infantry Division until 1988. He was then assigned as special-operations officer with Special Operations Command, Washington, D.C. in 1989. Grange attended the National War College and returned to Fort Bragg in June 1990 as deputy commander of Delta Force, in which job he commanded a task force during Desert Storm.

From July 1991 to July 1993, Grange commanded the 75th Ranger Regiment. He then served as deputy commanding officer of United States Army Special Operations Command. After his selection as a general officer, he served as both ADC for support and maneuver in the 3rd Infantry Division at Warner Barracks in Bamberg, Germany.

In 1997, Grange returned to Germany and took command of the 1st Infantry Division and Task Force Eagle in Bosnia, where he was responsible for U.S. forces and operations in North Macedonia and Kosovo during the Yugoslav Wars. In 1999, Grange relinquished command of the 1st Infantry Division to John Abizaid and retired from active duty.

== Activities in retirement ==
In December 1999, Grange published a critique of the Army's obsolete way of measuring unit readiness in the Armed Forces Journal. He then led a group of Army officers who wrote a book on improving force structure; Air-Mech-Strike: Asymmetric Maneuver Warfare for the 21st Century. He later served as the executive vice president and chief operating officer of the McCormick Foundation in Chicago.

In September 2005, Grange became the foundation's president and chief executive officer. In May 2009, Grange became CEO of Pharmaceutical Product Development, a Contract Research Organization based in North Carolina. Grange retired as CEO of PPD in May 2011.

Grange founded Osprey Global Solutions, a consulting firm and government contractor that offers logistics, intelligence, medical, security training, armament sales, financial forensics and construction services as well as philanthropic services through the Osprey Relief Foundation. Grange also served as the CEO of Osprey Armament, and conducts beginner to advanced training at the Osprey Training Center in Council, North Carolina.

In March 2011, just as the Libyan civil war was intensifying, Grange realized Libya could be a lucrative new market. Tyler Drumheller, a former CIA clandestine officer, who at the time had a consulting firm, advised Grange. Grange, Drumheller and Sidney Blumenthal worked on the Libya memos with Cody Shearer, a longtime Clinton family friend and Democratic political operative for the United States Department of State. Grange provided information operations expertise and "ground truth" geopolitical consultancy to Senior Executives in both public and private sectors. The expeditionary security assessments were conducted throughout the Middle East, North Africa and Asia Pacific Rim, providing critical strategic value to public and private sector decision makers. During the Libyan Civil War (2011–present) Osprey Global Solutions sought to build field hospitals in Libya and train the country's national police after the fall of Muammar el-Qaddafi. In 2015, national news reporting on the Secretary of State Hillary Clinton's 2012 email controversy highlighted that Grange was requested by private sector executives to provide his subject matter expertise for Libya.

== Personal life ==
Grange's wife, Holly, served in the North Carolina House of Representatives.

== Awards and decorations ==
MG Grange has been decorated for service, to include:

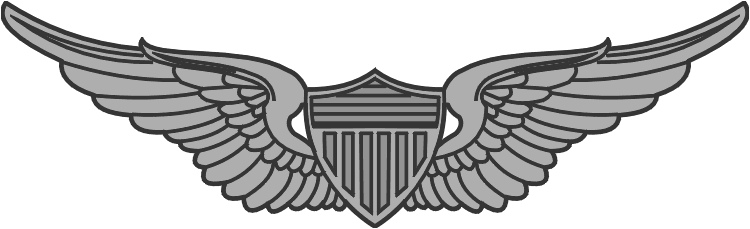

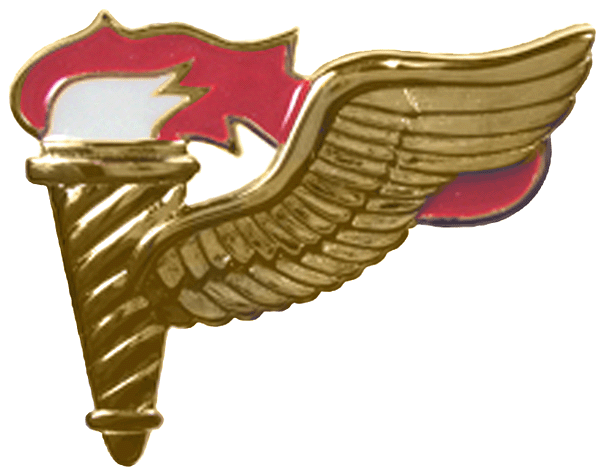

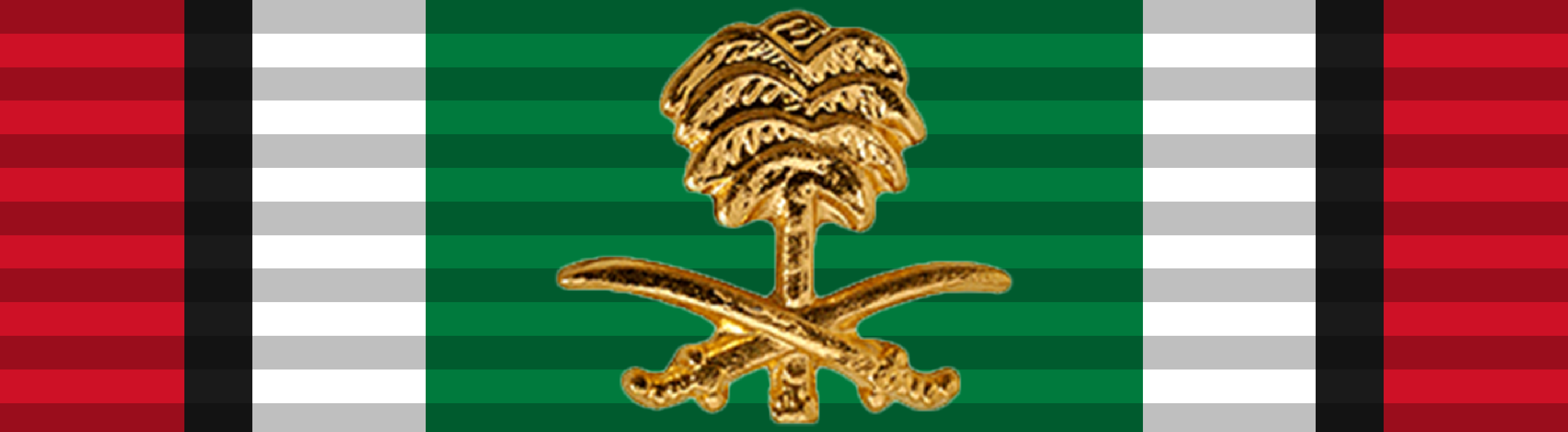

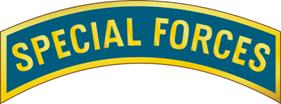

Badge	Combat Infantryman Badge			
Badge	United States Army Aviator Badge			
Badges	Master Parachutist Badge		Pathfinder Badge	
1st Row	Silver Star with 2 bronze Oak leaf clusters	Defense Superior Service Medal	Legion of Merit with 1 bronze Oak leaf cluster	Bronze Star with 1 bronze Oak leaf cluster
2nd Row	Purple Heart with 1 bronze Oak leaf cluster	Defense Meritorious Service Medal with 1 bronze Oak leaf cluster	Meritorious Service Medal with 2 bronze Oak leaf clusters	Air Medal with Award numeral 4
3rd Row	Joint Service Commendation Medal	Army Commendation Medal	Joint Meritorious Unit Award with 1 bronze Oak leaf cluster	Valorous Unit Award
4th Row	National Defense Service Medal with 1 Service Star	Armed Forces Expeditionary Medal	Vietnam Service Medal with 3 bronze Campaign stars	Southwest Asia Service Medal with 2 bronze Campaign stars
5th Row	Humanitarian Service Medal	Army Service Ribbon	Army Overseas Service Ribbon	Vietnam Gallantry Cross with silver and bronze Service stars
6th Row	Vietnam Staff Service Medal	Vietnam Gallantry Cross Unit Citation with Palm and Frame	Vietnam Campaign Medal with "60-" clasp	Kuwait Liberation Medal (Saudi Arabia)
Badges	Scuba Diver Badge		Air Assault Badge	Military Freefall Parachutist Badge
Badges	75th Ranger Regiment; Distinctive unit insignia		Iranian Master Parachutist Badge (3rd Class)	
Tabs	Special Forces Tab		Ranger Tab	

Grange was inducted into the U.S. Army Ranger Hall of Fame in 2005.

Military offices
Preceded by William F. Kernan	Commander, 75th Ranger Regiment; 1991–1993	Succeeded by James T. Jackson
Preceded by Montgomery Meigs	Commander, 1st Infantry Division; August 1997 – August 1999	Succeeded by John P. Abizaid
