= North Carolina's 26th House district =

American legislative district

North Carolina's 26th State House of Representatives district
Representative
Donna McDowell White; R–Clayton
- Demographics: 61% White; 19% Black; 14% Hispanic; 1% Asian; 1% Other; 4% Multiracial
- Population (2024): 96,531

North Carolina's 26th House district is one of 120 districts in the North Carolina House of Representatives. It has been represented by Republican Donna McDowell White since 2017.

== Geography ==
Since 2005, the district has included part of Johnston County. The district overlaps with the 10th Senate district.

== District officeholders ==
=== Multi-member district ===
Representative	Party	Dates	Notes	Representative	Party	Dates	Notes	Representative	Party	Dates	Notes	Representative	Party	Dates	Notes	Representative	Party	Dates	Notes	Representative	Party	Dates	Notes	Counties
District created January 1, 1967.
Skipper Bowles (Greensboro)	Democratic	January 1, 1967 – January 1, 1969	Retired to run for State Senate.	Jim Exum (Greensboro)	Democratic	January 1, 1967 – January 1, 1969		Charlie Phillips (Greensboro)	Democratic	January 1, 1967 – January 1, 1973	Redistricted from the Guilford County district. Redistricted to the 23rd district.	W. Marcus Short (Greensboro)	Democratic	January 1, 1967 – January 1, 1973	Redistricted from the Guilford County district.	Elton Edwards (Greensboro)	Democratic	January 1, 1967 – January 1, 1969	Redistricted from the Guilford County district. Retired to run for State Senate.	Daniel Whitley Jr. (High Point)	Democratic	January 1, 1967 – January 1, 1969	Redistricted from the Guilford County district.	1967–1973; All of Guilford County.
Henry Frye (Greensboro)	Democratic	January 1, 1969 – January 1, 1973	Redistricted to the 23rd district.	John Ridenour III (Greensboro)	Democratic	January 1, 1969 – January 1, 1971		Charlie Phillips (Greensboro)	Democratic	January 1, 1967 – January 1, 1973	Redistricted from the Guilford County district. Redistricted to the 23rd district.	W. Marcus Short (Greensboro)	Democratic	January 1, 1967 – January 1, 1973	Redistricted from the Guilford County district.	Howard Coble (Greensboro)	Republican	January 1, 1969 – January 1, 1971		Robert Payne (McLeansville)	Republican	January 1, 1969 – January 1, 1973	Redistricted to the 23rd district.	1967–1973; All of Guilford County.
Henry Frye (Greensboro)	Democratic	January 1, 1969 – January 1, 1973	Redistricted to the 23rd district.	McNeill Smith (Greensboro)	Democratic	January 1, 1971 – January 1, 1973	Redistricted to the 23rd district and retired to run for State Senate.	Charlie Phillips (Greensboro)	Democratic	January 1, 1967 – January 1, 1973	Redistricted from the Guilford County district. Redistricted to the 23rd district.	W. Marcus Short (Greensboro)	Democratic	January 1, 1967 – January 1, 1973	Redistricted from the Guilford County district.	Clifton Hunt Jr. (Greensboro)	Republican	January 1, 1971 – January 1, 1973		Robert Payne (McLeansville)	Republican	January 1, 1969 – January 1, 1973	Redistricted to the 23rd district.	1967–1973; All of Guilford County.

=== Single-member district ===
Representative	Party	Dates	Notes	Counties
Foyle Hightower Jr. (Wadesboro)	Democratic	January 1, 1973 – January 1, 1983	Redistricted from the 33rd district. Redistricted to the 33rd district.	1973–1983; All of Anson and Montgomery counties.
Herman Gist (Greensboro)	Democratic	January 1, 1983 – March 4, 1994	Died.	1983–1993; Parts of Guilford and Randolph counties.
Herman Gist (Greensboro)	Democratic	January 1, 1983 – March 4, 1994	Died.	1993–2003; Part of Guilford County.
Vacant		March 4, 1994 – May 24, 1994		1993–2003; Part of Guilford County.
Alma Adams (Greensboro)	Democratic	May 24, 1994 – January 1, 2003	Appointed to finish Gist's term. Redistricted to the 58th district.	1993–2003; Part of Guilford County.
Billy Creech (Clayton)	Republican	January 1, 2003 – January 1, 2005	Redistricted from the 20th district. Retired to run for Congress.	2003–2005; Parts of Johnston and Wayne counties.
Leo Daughtry (Smithfield)	Republican	January 1, 2005 – January 1, 2017	Redistricted from the 28th district. Retired.	2005–Present; Part of Johnston County.
Donna McDowell White (Clayton)	Republican	January 1, 2017 – Present		2005–Present; Part of Johnston County.

== Election results ==
=== 2026 ===
North Carolina House of Representatives 26th district Republican primary election, 2026
Party	Candidate	Votes	%
Republican	Donna McDowell White (incumbent)	4,816	70.46%
Republican	Margie Beth Riedel	2,019	29.54%
Total votes		6,835	100%

North Carolina House of Representatives 26th district general election, 2026
Party	Candidate	Votes	%
Republican	Donna McDowell White (incumbent)		
Democratic	L'Bertrice Solomon		
Total votes			100%

=== 2024 ===
North Carolina House of Representatives 26th district general election, 2024
Party	Candidate	Votes	%
Republican	Donna McDowell White (incumbent)	29,943	55.10%
Democratic	Matthew Wood	22,671	41.72%
Libertarian	Kevin Terrett	1,732	3.19%
Total votes		54,346	100%
Republican hold			

=== 2022 ===
North Carolina House of Representatives 26th district Republican primary election, 2022
Party	Candidate	Votes	%
Republican	Donna McDowell White (incumbent)	4,851	65.81%
Republican	Rick Walker	2,520	34.19%
Total votes		7,371	100%

North Carolina House of Representatives 26th district general election, 2022
Party	Candidate	Votes	%
Republican	Donna McDowell White (incumbent)	19,984	59.18%
Democratic	Linda Bennett	13,783	40.82%
Total votes		33,767	100%
Republican hold			

=== 2020 ===
North Carolina House of Representatives 26th district Republican primary election, 2020
Party	Candidate	Votes	%
Republican	Donna McDowell White (incumbent)	7,110	72.51%
Republican	Justin Tate	2,695	27.49%
Total votes		9,805	100%

North Carolina House of Representatives 26th district general election, 2020
Party	Candidate	Votes	%
Republican	Donna McDowell White (incumbent)	33,495	53.67%
Democratic	Linda Bennett	21,689	34.75%
Unaffaliated	Denton Lee	7,227	11.58%
Total votes		62,411	100%
Republican hold			

=== 2018 ===
North Carolina House of Representatives 26th district general election, 2018
Party	Candidate	Votes	%
Republican	Donna McDowell White (incumbent)	22,770	59.84%
Democratic	Linda Bennett	15,283	40.16%
Total votes		38,053	100%
Republican hold			

=== 2016 ===
North Carolina House of Representatives 26th district Republican primary election, 2016
Party	Candidate	Votes	%
Republican	Donna McDowell White	6,009	59.53%
Republican	Dennis Nielsen	4,085	40.47%
Total votes		10,094	100%

North Carolina House of Representatives 26th district general election, 2016
Party	Candidate	Votes	%
Republican	Donna McDowell White	25,899	58.05%
Democratic	Rich Nixon	18,716	41.95%
Total votes		44,615	100%
Republican hold			

=== 2014 ===
North Carolina House of Representatives 26th district Republican primary election, 2014
Party	Candidate	Votes	%
Republican	Leo Daughtry (incumbent)	3,426	73.16%
Republican	Dennis Nielsen	1,257	26.84%
Total votes		4,683	100%

North Carolina House of Representatives 26th district general election, 2014
Party	Candidate	Votes	%
Republican	Leo Daughtry (incumbent)	18,754	100%
Total votes		18,754	100%
Republican hold			

=== 2012 ===
North Carolina House of Representatives 26th district Democratic primary election, 2012
Party	Candidate	Votes	%
Democratic	Jenifer Bubenik	3,231	54.26%
Democratic	Ray Stallings Jr.	2,724	45.74%
Total votes		5,955	100%

North Carolina House of Representatives 26th district general election, 2012
Party	Candidate	Votes	%
Republican	Leo Daughtry (incumbent)	23,125	59.67%
Democratic	Jenifer Bubenik	15,633	40.33%
Total votes		38,758	100%
Republican hold			

=== 2010 ===
North Carolina House of Representatives 26th district general election, 2010
Party	Candidate	Votes	%
Republican	Leo Daughtry (incumbent)	18,941	100%
Total votes		18,941	100%
Republican hold			

=== 2008 ===
North Carolina House of Representatives 26th district general election, 2008
Party	Candidate	Votes	%
Republican	Leo Daughtry (incumbent)	21,709	54.72%
Democratic	Jimmy F. Garner	17,964	45.28%
Total votes		39,673	100%
Republican hold			

=== 2006 ===
North Carolina House of Representatives 26th district general election, 2006
Party	Candidate	Votes	%
Republican	Leo Daughtry (incumbent)	12,169	100%
Total votes		12,169	100%
Republican hold			

=== 2004 ===
North Carolina House of Representatives 26th district general election, 2004
Party	Candidate	Votes	%
Republican	Leo Daughtry (incumbent)	20,320	100%
Total votes		20,320	100%
Republican hold			

=== 2002 ===
North Carolina House of Representatives 26th district general election, 2002
Party	Candidate	Votes	%
Republican	Billy Creech (incumbent)	16,027	100%
Total votes		16,027	100%
Republican hold			

=== 2000 ===
North Carolina House of Representatives 26th district general election, 2000
Party	Candidate	Votes	%
Democratic	Alma Adams (incumbent)	14,677	73.75%
Republican	James A. "Jim" Rumley	5,224	26.25%
Total votes		19,901	100%
Democratic hold			
