= Robert D. Warren Sr. =

American politician

Robert Davis "Bob" Warren Sr. (July 22, 1928 – March 22, 2013) was an American educator and politician.

Born in Sampson County, North Carolina, Warren graduated from North Carolina State University and was an agriculture teacher and principal. He was the director of driver's licenses for North Carolina 1970–1974. He then served in the North Carolina State Senate 1980-1988 from Benson, North Carolina. In 2005 a stretch of Interstate 40 in Johnston and Sampson counties was renamed the Sen. Robert D. Warren Highway. Warren was also conferred the Order of the Long Leaf Pine in 2005.
