= 2020 North Carolina gubernatorial election =

- November 3, 2020
- Turnout: 75.35% ▲6.37pp
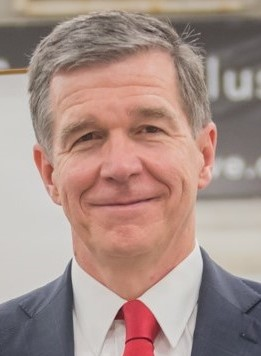

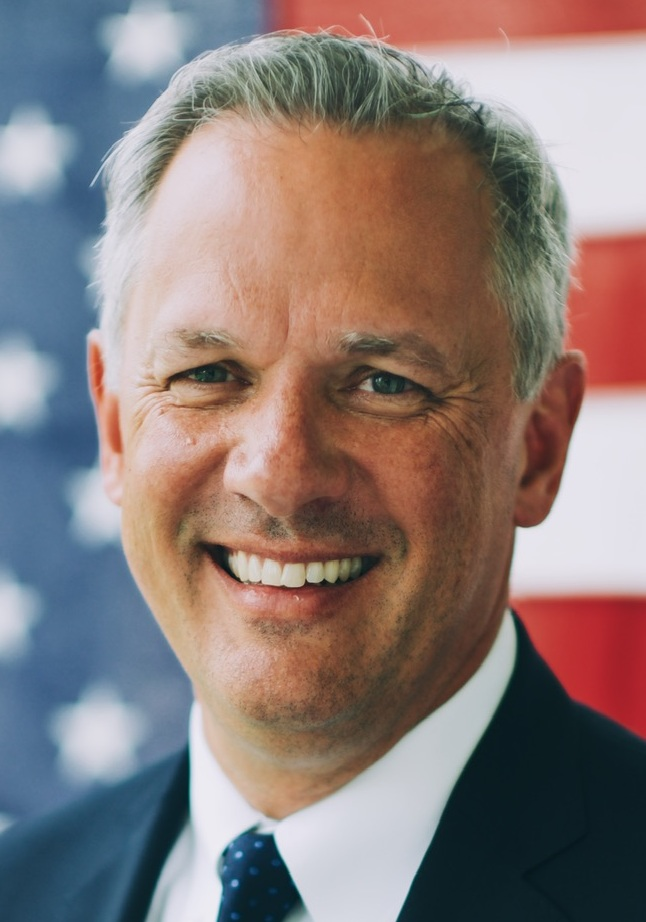
Nominee	Roy Cooper	Dan Forest
Party	Democratic	Republican
Popular vote	2,834,790	2,586,605
Percentage	51.52%	47.01%
- Cooper: 40–50% 50–60% 60–70% 70–80% 80–90% >90% Forest: 40–50% 50–60% 60–70% 70–80% 80–90% >90% Tie: 40–50%
Governor before election
Roy Cooper
Democratic
Elected Governor
Roy Cooper
Democratic

The 2020 North Carolina gubernatorial election was held on November 3, 2020, to elect the governor of North Carolina, concurrently with the 2020 U.S. presidential election, as well as elections to one-third of the United States Senate and elections to the United States House of Representatives and various state and local elections. Democratic incumbent Roy Cooper was elected to a second term, defeating Republican lieutenant governor Dan Forest. Cooper became the first North Carolina governor to win re-election since Mike Easley in 2004. He also outperformed other Democrats on the ballot and was the only Democrat to win a gubernatorial race in a state carried by Donald Trump in 2020. With a margin of 4.51%, this election was the second closest of the 2020 gubernatorial election cycle after Puerto Rico and the closest in a U.S. state.

== Democratic primary ==
=== Candidates ===
==== Nominee ====
- Roy Cooper, incumbent governor

==== Eliminated in primary ====
- Ernest T. Reeves, retired U.S. Army captain and perennial candidate

=== Polling ===
Poll source	Date(s) administered	Sample size (Note: Key: A – all adults RV – registered voters LV – likely voters V – unclear)	Margin of error	Roy Cooper	Ernest Reeves	Undecided
High Point University	February 21–28, 2020	269 (LV)	–	74%	13%	13%
High Point University	February 21–28, 2020	468 (RV)	–	68%	14%	18%
SurveyUSA/WRAL-TV	February 13–16, 2020	698 (LV)	± 4.9%	73%	9%	18%
High Point University	January 31 – February 6, 2020	198 (LV)	–	80%	8%	12%
High Point University	January 31 – February 6, 2020	400 (RV)	–	69%	10%	21%

=== Results ===
Results by county: Cooper—>90% Cooper—80–90% Cooper—70–80%

Democratic primary results
Party	Candidate	Votes	%
Democratic	Roy Cooper (incumbent)	1,128,829	87.19%
Democratic	Ernest T. Reeves	165,804	12.81%
Total votes		1,294,633	100.00%

== Republican primary ==
=== Candidates ===
==== Nominee ====
- Dan Forest, lieutenant governor of North Carolina

==== Eliminated in primary ====
- Holly Grange, state representative

==== Declined ====
- Pat McCrory, former governor of North Carolina
- Mark Meadows, former U.S. Representative for North Carolina's 11th congressional district, White House Chief of Staff

=== Endorsements ===
Dan Forest

Executive branch officials

- Donald Trump, 45th President of the United States (2017–2021)

U.S. Representatives

- Mark Meadows, former (NC-11) and former White House Chief of Staff

Organizations

- Susan B. Anthony List

=== Polling ===
Poll source	Date(s) administered	Sample size	Margin of error	Dan Forest	Holly Grange	Pat McCrory	Undecided
High Point University	February 21–28, 2020	246 (LV)	–	74%	13%	–	13%
High Point University	February 21–28, 2020	443 (RV)	–	64%	12%	–	24%
SurveyUSA/WRAL-TV	February 13–16, 2020	698 (LV)	± 5.0%	60%	8%	–	32%
High Point University	January 31 – February 6, 2020	198 (LV)	–	67%	8%	–	25%
High Point University	January 31 – February 6, 2020	400 (RV)	–	54%	10%	–	36%
	December 19, 2019	McCrory announces he will not run					
Harper Polling (R)	December 2–4, 2019	500 (LV)	± 4.38%	31%	3%	42%	25%

=== Results ===
Results by county: Forest—>90% Forest—80–90% Forest—70–80%

Republican primary results
Party	Candidate	Votes	%
Republican	Dan Forest	698,077	88.95%
Republican	Holly Grange	86,714	11.05%
Total votes		784,791	100.00%

== Other candidates ==
=== Libertarian Party ===
==== Nominee ====
- Steven J. DiFiore, candidate for Charlotte City Council in 2017, factory lighting representative

=== Constitution Party ===
==== Nominee ====
- Al Pisano, chairman of the Constitution Party of North Carolina

== General election ==
=== Predictions ===
Source	Ranking	As of
The Cook Political Report	Likely D	October 23, 2020
Inside Elections	Lean D	October 28, 2020
Sabato's Crystal Ball	Likely D	November 2, 2020
Politico	Lean D	November 2, 2020
Daily Kos	Likely D	October 28, 2020
RCP	Lean D	November 2, 2020
270towin	Likely D	November 2, 2020

=== Endorsements ===
Roy Cooper (D)

U.S. presidents

- Barack Obama, 44th President of the United States

State and local officials

- Pete Buttigieg, former Mayor of South Bend, Indiana (2012–2020)

Organizations

- Equality NC

Newspapers

- The Charlotte Observer
- Indy Week
Dan Forest (R)

U.S. presidents

- Donald Trump, 45th President of the United States (2017–2021)

U.S. executive branch officials

- Mark Meadows, White House Chief of Staff for Donald Trump and former U.S. Representative from North Carolina's 11th congressional district

Organizations

- Susan B. Anthony List

=== Debates ===
A debate between Cooper and Forest occurred 7:00 pm EDT, October 14, 2020.

Dates	Location	Cooper	Forest	Link
October 14, 2020	Raleigh, North Carolina	Participant	Participant	Full debate - C-SPAN

=== Polling ===
View source data.

Poll source	Date(s) administered	Sample size	Margin of error	Roy Cooper (D)	Dan Forest (R)	Other / Undecided
Swayable	October 27 – November 1, 2020	655 (LV)	± 5.5%	55%	43%	2% (Note: DiFiore (L) with 2%; Pisano (C) with 0%)
Frederick Polls (D) (Note: Compete Everywhere primarily supports Democratic candidates)	October 30–31, 2020	676 (LV)	± 3.7%	52%	45%	3% (Note: DiFiore (L) with 2%; Pisano (C) with 1%)
Emerson College	October 29–31, 2020	855 (LV)	± 3.3%	55% (Note: With voters who lean towards a given candidate)	45%	1% (Note: "Someone else" with 1%)
CNN/SSRS	October 23–30, 2020	901 (LV)	± 4%	52%	42%	5% (Note: DiFiore (L) with 3%; Pisano (C) with 1%; "Other" with 0%; "None of these" with no voters; Undecided with 1%)
East Carolina University	October 27–28, 2020	1,103 (LV)	± 3.4%	54% (Note: With voters who lean towards a given candidate)	43%	2% (Note: "Refused" and "Some other candidate" with 1%; Did/would not vote with 0%; Undecided with no voters)
Cardinal Point Analytics (R)	October 27–28, 2020	750 (LV)	± 3.6%	47%	45%	8% (Note: DiFiore (L) with 3%; Pisano (C) with 1%; Undecided with 4%)
Marist College/NBC	October 25–28, 2020	800 (LV)	± 4.7%	59%	40%	1% (Note: "Other" with 0%; Undecided with 1%)
Gravis Marketing	October 26–27, 2020	614 (LV)	± 4%	51%	43%	6% (Note: Undecided with 6%)
Meeting Street Insights (R)	October 24–27, 2020	600 (LV)	± 4%	51%	43%	–
Siena College/NYT Upshot	October 23–27, 2020	1,034 (LV)	± 3.4%	51%	42%	7% (Note: DiFiore (L), Pisano (C) and would not vote with 1%; "Someone else" with 0%; "Undecided/Refused" with 4%)
RMG Research	October 24–26, 2020	800 (LV)	± 3.5%	53%	41%	6% (Note: "Someone else" and Undecided with 3%)
Swayable	October 23–26, 2020	386 (LV)	± 6.9%	53%	44%	3% (Note: DiFiore (L) with 2%; Pisano (C) with 1%)
SurveyUSA/WRAL-TV	October 23–26, 2020	627 (LV)	± 4.9%	53%	42%	6% (Note: "Other" with 2%; Undecided with 4%)
YouGov/UMass Amherst	October 20–26, 2020	911 (LV)	± 4.2%	54%	42%	3% (Note: "Another candidate" with 0%; Did not vote with no voters; Undecided with 3%)
Harper Polling/Civitas (R)	October 22–25, 2020	504 (LV)	± 4.4%	52%	42%	5% (Note: DiFiore (L) with 1%; Pisano (C) with 0%; Undecided with 4%)
Meredith College	October 16–19, 2020	732 (LV)	± 3.5%	52%	34%	16% (Note: DiFiore (L) with 2%; Pisano (C) with 1%; Undecided with 13%)
East Carolina University	October 15–18, 2020	1,155 (LV)	± 3.4%	53%	44%	2% (Note: "Some other candidate" and would/did not vote with 1%; "Refused" with 0%; Undecided with 1%)
Emerson College	October 13–14, 2020	721 (LV)	± 3.6%	50%	46%	4% (Note: Undecided with 4%)
Civiqs/Daily Kos	October 11–14, 2020	1,211 (LV)	± 3.3%	53%	46%	1% (Note: DiFiore (L) with 1%; Pisano (C), "Someone else" and Undecided with 0%)
Siena College/NYT Upshot	October 9–13, 2020	627 (LV)	± 4.5%	51%	37%	12% (Note: DiFiore (L) with 2%; Pisano (C) with 1%; "Someone else" and would not vote with 0%; "Undecided/Refused" with 9%)
Monmouth University	October 8–11, 2020	500 (RV)	± 4.4%	51%	44%	5% (Note: DiFiore (L) and "No one" with 1%; Pisano (C) with 0%; "Other candidate" with no voters; Undecided with 3%)
Monmouth University	October 8–11, 2020	500 (LV) (Note: With a likely voter turnout model featuring high turnout)	± 4.4%	52%	44%	3% (Note: "Other" with 1%; Undecided with 2%)
Monmouth University	October 8–11, 2020	500 (LV) (Note: With a likely voter turnout model featuring low turnout)	± 4.4%	51%	46%	3% (Note: "Other" with 1%; Undecided with 2%)
SurveyUSA	October 8–11, 2020	669 (LV)	± 4.8%	52%	39%	10% (Note: "Some other candidate" with 2%; Undecided with 8%)
RMG Research	October 7–11, 2020	800 (LV)	–	51%	37%	12% (Note: DiFiore (L) with 3%; Undecided with 9%)
Public Policy Polling	October 4–5, 2020	911 (V)	± 3.3%	52%	40%	8% (Note: Undecided with 8%)
East Carolina University	October 2–4, 2020	1,232 (LV)	± 3.2%	53%	40%	7% (Note: "Some other candidate" with 2%; would not vote with 0%; Undecided with 4%)
ALG Research (D) (Note: Poll sponsored by Piedmont Rising, a pro-Affordable Care Act organization.)	September 22–28, 2020	822 (V)	–	53%	43%	–
YouGov/UMass Lowell	September 18–25, 2020	921 (LV)	± 4.1%	54%	41%	4% (Note: "Another candidate" with 0%; Undecided with 4%)
Meredith College	September 18–22, 2020	705 (RV)	± 3.5%	50%	39%	11% (Note: DiFiore (L) with 2%; Pisano (C) with 1%; Undecided with 8%)
Harper Polling/Civitas (R)	September 17–20, 2020	612 (LV)	± 3.96%	46%	39%	14% (Note: DiFiore (L) and Pisano (C) with 1%; Undecided with 12%)
Siena College/NYT Upshot	September 11–16, 2020	653 (LV)	± 4.3%	47%	42%	10% (Note: Pisano (C) with 2%; DiFiore (L) with 1%; "Someone else" and would not vote with 0%; "Undecided/Refused" with 7%)
Redfield & Wilton Strategies	September 12–15, 2020	1,092 (LV)	± 2.97%	55%	36%	9% (Note: "Another Third Party/Write-in" with 2%; Undecided with 7%)
Suffolk University	September 10–14, 2020	500 (LV)	± 4.4%	50%	38%	12% (Note: DiFiore (L) with 5%; Pisano (C) with 1%; "Other" and "Refused" with 0%; Undecided with 6%)
SurveyUSA	September 10–13, 2020	596 (LV)	± 5.6%	49%	42%	10% (Note: "Another candidate" with 3%; Undecided with 7%)
CNN/SSRS	September 9–13, 2020	787 (LV)	± 4.4%	53%	44%	2% (Note: DiFiore (L) with 1%; "None of these" and Pisano (C) with 0%; "Other" with no voters; Undecided with 1%)
CNN/SSRS	September 9–13, 2020	893 (RV)	± 4.1%	53%	42%	5% (Note: DiFiore (L) with 2%; "None of these" with 1%; "Other" and Pisano (C) with 0%; Undecided with 2%)
Kaiser Family Foundation/Cook Political Report	August 29 – September 13, 2020	1,116 (RV)	–	48%	38%	14% (Note: "Neither/Another Party" with 1% "Undecided/Don't know/Refused" with 12%)
Redfield & Wilton Strategies	August 30 – September 3, 2020	951 (LV)	± 3.18%	54%	35%	11% (Note: "Another Third Party/Write-in" with 2%; Undecided with 9%)
Monmouth University	August 29 – September 1, 2020	401 (RV)	± 4.9%	51%	40%	8% (Note: DiFiore (L) with 3%; "No one" and Pisano (C) with 1%; "Other candidate" with 0%; Undecided with 3%)
Monmouth University	August 29 – September 1, 2020	401 (LV) (Note: With a likely voter turnout model featuring higher turnout than in the 2016 presidential election)	± 4.9%	51%	42%	7% (Note: "Other" with 5%; Undecided with 2%)
Monmouth University	August 29 – September 1, 2020	401 (LV) (Note: With a likely voter turnout model featuring lower turnout than in the 2016 presidential election)	± 4.9%	51%	42%	7%
East Carolina University	August 29–30, 2020	1,101 (LV)	± 3.4%	50%	40%	10% (Note: "Some other candidate" with 2%; Would not vote with 0%; Undecided with 8%)
Redfield and Wilton Strategies	August 16–19, 2020	967 (LV)	± 3.2%	51%	38%	11% (Note: "Third party/write-in" with 2%; Undecided with 9%)
East Carolina University	August 12–13, 2020	1,255 (RV)	± 3.2%	52%	38%	11% (Note: "Some other candidate" with 3%; would not vote with 1%; Undecided with 7%)
Emerson College	August 8–10, 2020	673 (LV)	± 3.8%	50%	44%	7% (Note: Undecided with 7%)
Harper Polling/Civitas (R)	August 6–10, 2020	600 (LV)	± 4.0%	49%	39%	13% (Note: DiFiore (L) and Pisano (C) with 1%; Undecided with 11%)
Public Policy Polling (D) (Note: This poll's sponsor, AFSCME, had endorsed Biden prior to the sampling period)	July 23–24, 2020	884 (V)	± 3.4%	53%	42%	5% (Note: Undecided with 5%)
Cardinal Point Analytics (R)	July 22–24, 2020	735 (LV)	± 3.6%	46%	46%	8% (Note: Pisano (C) with 0.9%, DiFiore (L) with 0.7%; Undecided with 5.9%)
Redfield & Wilton Strategies	July 19–23, 2020	919 (LV)	± 3.2%	51%	37%	12% (Note: "Third party/write-in" with 1%; Undecided with 11%)
Marist College/NBC News	July 14–22, 2020	882 (RV)	± 4.0%	58%	38%	4% (Note: "Other" with 0%; Undecided with 4%)
Cardinal Point Analytics (R)	July 13–15, 2020	547 (LV)	± 4.2%	49%	46%	5% (Note: Undecided with 3.7%; DiFore with 0.5%; Pisano with 0.4%)
East Carolina University	June 22–25, 2020	1,149 (RV)	± 3.4%	49%	38%	13% (Note: Undecided with 8%; "Some other candidate" with 5%)
Public Policy Polling	June 22–23, 2020	1,157 (V)	± 2.9%	50%	41%	10% (Note: Undecided with 10%)
NYT Upshot/Siena College	June 8–18, 2020	653 (RV)	± 4.1%	50%	39%	11% (Note: Undecided with 10%; "Another candidate" with 1%; would not vote with 0%)
Gravis Marketing (R)	June 17, 2020	631 (RV)	± 3.9%	46%	46%	8%
Redfield & Wilton Strategies	June 14–17, 2020	902 (LV)	± 3.6%	52%	31%	17% (Note: Undecided with 14%; "Third party/write-in" with 3%)
Public Policy Polling	June 2–3, 2020	913	± 3.2%	50%	39%	11% (Note: Undecided with 11%)
Harper Polling/Civitas (R)	May 26–28, 2020	500 (LV)	± 4.4%	49%	37%	14% (Note: Undecided with 13%; Pisano (C) with 1%; DiFiore (L) with 0%)
Neighbourhood Research & Media	May 12–21, 2020	391 (LV)	–	47%	35%	18%
Meeting Street Insights (R)	May 9–13, 2020	500 (RV)	–	55%	37%	8%
East Carolina University	May 7–9, 2020	1,111 (RV)	± 3.4%	51%	36%	13%
Civiqs/Daily Kos	May 2–4, 2020	1,362 (RV)	± 3.0%	53%	44%	3%
Meredith College	April 27–28, 2020	604 (RV)	± 4.0%	52%	32%	16%
SurveyUSA	April 23–26, 2020	580 (LV)	± 5.4%	57%	30%	13% (Note: Undecided with 13%)
Public Policy Polling	April 20–21, 2020	1,275 (V)	± 3.2%	53%	40%	7%
Garin-Hart-Yang Research (D)	April 13–18, 2020	800 (LV)	± 3.5%	55%	36%	9%
Public Policy Polling	April 14–15, 2020	1,318 (V)	± 3.4%	50%	36%	13%
Harper Polling/Civitas (R)	April 5–7, 2020	500 (LV)	± 4.4%	50%	33%	17%
East Carolina University	February 27–28, 2020	1,288 (RV)	± 3.2%	49%	41%	10%
Harper Polling/Civitas (R)	October 15–17, 2019	500 (LV)	± 4.4%	46%	36%	18%
Meredith College	September 29 – October 7, 2019	996 (RV)	± 3.0%	46%	33%	21%
Harper Polling/Civitas (R)	August 1–4, 2019	500 (LV)	± 4.4%	48%	36%	16%
Public Policy Polling	June 17–18, 2019	610 (RV)	± 4.0%	45%	41%	14%
Harper Polling (R)	June 8–10, 2019	500 (LV)	± 4.4%	47%	37%	16%
Emerson College	May 31 – June 3, 2019	932 (RV)	± 3.1%	52%	38%	10%
Spry Strategies (R) (Note: Poll sponsored by the North Carolina Republican Party)	May 25 – June 1, 2019	730 (LV)	± 3.5%	40%	44%	16%
Public Policy Polling	January 4–7, 2019	750 (RV)	± 3.6%	47%	35%	18%

Hypothetical polling

with Holly Grange

Poll source	Date(s) administered	Sample size	Margin of error	Roy Cooper (D)	Holly Grange (R)	Other / Undecided
East Carolina University	February 27–28, 2020	1,288 (RV)	± 3.2%	49%	33%	18%
Harper Polling/Civitas (R)	October 15–17, 2019	500 (LV)	± 4.4%	46%	27%	27%
Harper Polling/Civitas (R)	August 1–4, 2019	500 (LV)	± 4.4%	48%	30%	22%

with Phil Berger

Poll source	Date(s) administered	Sample size	Margin of error	Roy Cooper (D)	Phil Berger (R)	Other / Undecided
Public Policy Polling	June 17–18, 2019	610 (RV)	± 4.0%	46%	39%	16%
Public Policy Polling	January 4–7, 2019	750 (RV)	± 3.6%	48%	34%	18%

with Pat McCrory

Poll source	Date(s) administered	Sample size	Margin of error	Roy Cooper (D)	Pat McCrory (R)	Other / Undecided
Harper Polling/Civitas (R)	October 15–17, 2019	500 (LV)	± 4.4%	44%	38%	18%
Harper Polling/Civitas (R)	August 1–4, 2019	500 (LV)	± 4.4%	47%	38%	14%
Public Policy Polling	January 4–7, 2019	750 (RV)	± 3.6%	45%	41%	14%

with Tim Moore

Poll source	Date(s) administered	Sample size	Margin of error	Roy Cooper (D)	Tim Moore (R)	Other / Undecided
Public Policy Polling	June 17–18, 2019	610 (RV)	± 4.0%	46%	38%	16%
Public Policy Polling	January 4–7, 2019	750 (RV)	± 3.6%	46%	32%	22%

with Thom Tillis

Poll source	Date(s) administered	Sample size	Margin of error	Roy Cooper (D)	Thom Tillis (R)	Other / Undecided
Public Policy Polling	January 4–7, 2019	750 (RV)	± 3.6%	46%	37%	17%

=== Results ===
2020 North Carolina gubernatorial election
Party	Candidate	Votes	%	±%
Democratic	Roy Cooper (incumbent)	2,834,790	51.52%	+2.50%
Republican	Dan Forest	2,586,605	47.01%	−1.79%
Libertarian	Steven J. DiFiore	60,449	1.10%	−1.09%
Constitution	Al Pisano	20,934	0.38%	N/A
Total votes		5,502,778	100.00%	N/A
Turnout		5,545,847	75.35%	
Registered electors		7,359,798		
Democratic hold				

==== By county ====
County	Roy Cooper Democratic		Dan Forest Republican		Various candidates Other parties		Margin		Total
County	#	%	#	%	#	%	#	%	Total
Alamance	41,979	48.8%	42,918	49.9%	1,038	1.2%	−939	−1.1%	85,935
Alexander	4,980	24.7%	14,980	74.2%	227	1.2%	−10,000	−49.5%	20,187
Alleghany	1,929	31.7%	4,085	67.1%	70	1.2%	−2,156	−35.4%	6,084
Anson	6,116	54.6%	4,977	44.4%	113	1.0%	1,139	10.2%	11,206
Ashe	4,967	31.5%	10,622	67.3%	188	1.2%	−5,655	−35.8%	15,777
Avery	2,407	25.6%	6,894	73.2%	116	1.3%	−4,487	−47.6%	9,417
Beaufort	10,291	39.2%	15,710	59.9%	231	0.9%	−5,419	−20.7%	26,232
Bertie	6,080	62.1%	3,654	37.3%	54	0.5%	2,426	24.8%	9,788
Bladen	7,784	45.7%	9,096	53.4%	153	0.9%	-1,312	-7.7%	17,033
Brunswick	36,818	41.0%	51,703	57.6%	1,260	1.4%	−14,885	−16.6%	89,781
Buncombe	99,395	62.0%	58,153	36.2%	2,894	1.8%	41,242	25.8%	160,442
Burke	15,028	33.8%	28,898	65.0%	533	1.2%	−13,870	−31.2%	44,459
Cabarrus	54,665	47.0%	59,682	51.3%	1,990	1.7%	−5,017	−4.3%	116,337
Caldwell	11,926	27.9%	30,234	70.9%	513	1.2%	−18,308	−43.0%	42,673
Camden	1,600	27.1%	4,200	71.0%	113	1.9%	−2,600	−43.9%	5,913
Carteret	13,293	31.3%	28,689	67.5%	542	1.3%	−15,396	−36.2%	42,524
Caswell	5,285	44.0%	6,634	55.2%	101	0.9%	-1,349	-11.2%	12,020
Catawba	28,267	34.0%	53,802	64.6%	1,179	1.4%	−25,535	−30.6%	83,248
Chatham	28,128	57.9%	19,937	41.1%	479	0.9%	8,191	16.8%	48,544
Cherokee	3,772	23.1%	12,349	75.5%	230	1.4%	−8,577	−52.4%	16,351
Chowan	3,399	43.8%	4,308	55.5%	58	0.8%	−909	−11.7%	7,765
Clay	1,761	25.7%	4,994	72.8%	103	1.5%	−3,233	−47.1%	6,858
Cleveland	18,549	36.3%	32,031	62.7%	544	1.1%	−13,482	−26.4%	51,124
Columbus	10,309	39.3%	15,713	59.9%	223	0.8%	−5,404	−20.6%	26,245
Craven	22,436	42.4%	29,614	56.0%	806	1.5%	−7,178	−13.6%	52,856
Cumberland	88,278	60.3%	55,197	37.7%	3,018	2.1%	33,081	22.6%	146,493
Currituck	4,382	27.3%	11,293	70.5%	350	2.2%	−6,911	−43.2%	16,025
Dare	10,485	43.7%	13,151	54.8%	384	1.6%	−2,666	−11.1%	24,020
Davidson	26,598	30.1%	60,771	68.7%	1,061	1.2%	−34,173	−38.6%	88,430
Davie	7,904	31.3%	17,104	67.7%	270	1.1%	−9,200	−36.4%	25,278
Duplin	9,164	40.5%	13,295	58.7%	181	0.8%	−4,131	−18.2%	22,640
Durham	147,110	81.9%	29,989	16.7%	2,496	1.4%	117,121	65.2%	179,595
Edgecombe	16,786	66.0%	8,487	33.3%	176	0.7%	8,299	32.7%	25,449
Forsyth	118,663	59.2%	78,475	39.2%	3,186	1.6%	40,188	20.0%	200,324
Franklin	17,427	46.7%	19,400	51.9%	518	1.4%	−1,973	−6.2%	37,345
Gaston	44,074	38.4%	69,158	60.2%	1,687	1.5%	−25,084	−21.8%	114,919
Gates	2,679	45.2%	3,163	53.3%	91	1.6%	-484	-8.1%	5,933
Graham	1,104	23.8%	3,489	75.1%	51	1.1%	−2,385	−51.3%	4,644
Granville	15,756	49.9%	15,411	48.8%	381	1.2%	345	1.1%	31,548
Greene	3,991	45.7%	4,678	53.6%	66	0.8%	−687	−7.9%	8,735
Guilford	180,160	63.8%	97,973	34.7%	4,459	1.6%	82,187	29.1%	282,592
Halifax	16,098	62.6%	9,403	36.6%	197	0.8%	6,695	26.0%	25,698
Harnett	23,987	41.3%	33,049	56.9%	1,046	1.8%	−9,062	−15.6%	58,082
Haywood	14,779	40.5%	21,185	58.1%	495	1.3%	−6,406	−17.6%	36,459
Henderson	29,144	42.7%	38,028	55.8%	1,018	1.5%	−8,884	−13.1%	68,190
Hertford	7,212	68.2%	3,282	31.1%	74	0.7%	3,930	37.1%	10,568
Hoke	12,597	58.5%	8,475	39.4%	456	2.1%	4,122	19.1%	21,528
Hyde	1,111	44.7%	1,351	54.4%	21	0.8%	-240	-9.7%	2,483
Iredell	36,375	35.7%	63,962	62.7%	1,660	1.6%	−27,587	−27.0%	101,997
Jackson	10,406	48.7%	10,519	49.3%	421	2.0%	-113	-0.6%	21,346
Johnston	45,165	40.7%	64,310	57.9%	1,599	1.4%	−19,145	−17.2%	111,074
Jones	2,333	42.3%	3,128	56.7%	51	0.9%	−795	−14.4%	5,512
Lee	13,522	46.9%	14,937	51.8%	402	1.4%	−1,415	−4.9%	28,861
Lenoir	14,208	50.1%	13,906	49.1%	118	0.8%	302	1.0%	28,348
Lincoln	14,730	29.4%	34,711	69.3%	667	1.3%	−19,981	−39.9%	50,108
Macon	7,062	34.1%	13,333	64.5%	289	1.4%	−6,271	−30.4%	20,684
Madison	5,489	42.1%	7,352	56.3%	210	1.6%	−1,863	−14.2%	13,051
Martin	6,277	50.2%	6,154	49.2%	82	0.6%	123	1.0%	12,513
McDowell	6,851	29.9%	15,761	68.8%	288	1.3%	−8,910	−38.9%	22,900
Mecklenburg	382,726	67.8%	171,123	30.3%	10,584	1.8%	211,603	37.5%	564,433
Mitchell	2,090	23.2%	6,827	75.8%	84	1.0%	−4,737	−52.6%	9,001
Montgomery	5,069	39.5%	7,622	59.4%	135	1.0%	−2,553	−19.9%	12,826
Moore	22,974	39.5%	34,311	59.0%	842	1.4%	−11,337	−19.5%	58,127
Nash	27,692	53.1%	24,062	46.1%	440	0.9%	3,630	7.0%	52,194
New Hanover	69,544	53.0%	59,305	45.2%	2,417	1.8%	10,249	7.8%	131,276
Northampton	6,313	62.6%	3,689	36.6%	82	0.8%	2,624	26.0%	10,084
Onslow	25,653	35.9%	43,838	61.3%	1,987	2.7%	−18,185	−25.4%	71,478
Orange	65,042	76.7%	18,810	22.2%	963	1.1%	46,232	54.5%	84,815
Pamlico	2,881	37.8%	4,672	61.3%	73	0.9%	−1,791	−23.5%	7,626
Pasquotank	10,061	50.8%	9,449	47.7%	301	1.5%	612	3.1%	19,811
Pender	12,599	37.1%	20,854	61.3%	552	1.7%	−8,255	−24.2%	34,005
Perquimans	2,637	35.3%	4,756	63.7%	78	1.1%	−2,119	−28.4%	7,471
Person	9,301	42.6%	12,296	56.4%	212	1.0%	−2,995	−13.8%	21,809
Pitt	48,995	56.1%	37,210	42.6%	1,183	1.3%	11,785	13.5%	87,388
Polk	4,863	39.5%	7,280	59.2%	156	1.2%	−2,417	−19.7%	12,299
Randolph	18,929	26.0%	53,176	72.9%	808	1.1%	−34,247	−46.9%	72,913
Richmond	9,622	46.6%	10,740	52.1%	269	1.3%	-1,118	-5.5%	20,631
Robeson	22,281	47.8%	23,888	51.3%	241	0.9%	-1,607	-3.5%	46,590
Rockingham	18,197	38.2%	28,891	60.6%	574	1.2%	−10,694	−22.4%	47,652
Rowan	25,473	34.8%	46,676	63.7%	1,070	1.4%	−21,203	−28.9%	73,219
Rutherford	10,469	30.5%	23,437	68.4%	370	1.1%	−12,968	−37.9%	34,276
Sampson	11,890	41.7%	16,404	57.5%	244	0.8%	−4,514	−15.8%	28,538
Scotland	7,671	52.4%	6,821	46.6%	155	1.0%	850	5.8%	14,647
Stanly	9,413	27.8%	24,022	71.0%	381	1.1%	−14,609	−43.2%	33,816
Stokes	6,567	25.6%	18,849	73.4%	265	1.1%	−12,282	−47.8%	25,681
Surry	10,872	29.7%	25,366	69.3%	361	1.0%	−14,494	−39.6%	36,599
Swain	3,043	43.3%	3,847	54.7%	139	2.0%	−804	−11.4%	7,029
Transylvania	9,226	45.4%	10,800	53.1%	299	1.4%	−1,574	−7.7%	20,325
Tyrrell	811	45.0%	975	54.1%	16	0.9%	−164	−9.1%	1,802
Union	51,306	39.3%	77,305	59.3%	1,860	1.5%	−25,999	−20.0%	130,471
Vance	13,160	62.8%	7,608	36.3%	182	0.8%	5,552	26.5%	20,950
Wake	410,386	65.2%	209,183	33.2%	10,104	1.6%	201,203	32.0%	629,673
Warren	6,716	65.2%	3,497	34.0%	82	0.8%	3,219	31.2%	10,295
Washington	3,531	57.0%	2,623	42.4%	37	0.6%	908	14.6%	6,191
Watauga	17,642	55.1%	13,790	43.0%	608	1.9%	3,852	12.1%	32,040
Wayne	25,589	46.3%	29,056	52.5%	671	1.2%	−3,467	−6.2%	55,316
Wilkes	9,537	27.0%	25,469	72.0%	344	1.0%	−15,932	−45.0%	35,350
Wilson	22,014	54.1%	18,305	45.0%	366	0.9%	3,709	9.1%	40,685
Yadkin	4,777	24.0%	14,910	74.9%	213	1.1%	−10,133	−50.9%	19,900
Yancey	4,147	36.5%	7,105	62.5%	122	1.0%	−2,958	−26.0%	11,374
Totals	2,834,790	51.5%	2,586,605	47.0%	81,383	1.5%	248,186	4.5%	5,502,778

Counties that flipped from Democratic to Republican

- Jackson (largest city: Cullowhee)

Counties that flipped from Republican to Democratic

- Lenoir (largest city: Kinston)
- Martin (largest city: Williamston)

==== By congressional district ====
Despite winning a majority of the popular vote, Cooper only won five of 13 congressional districts.

District	Forest	Cooper	Representative
1st	42.6%	56.4%	G. K. Butterfield
2nd	31.4%	67.0%	Deborah K. Ross
3rd	58.5%	40.0%	Greg Murphy
4th	29.9%	68.8%	David Price
5th	63.5%	35.2%	Virginia Foxx
6th	34.2%	64.2%	Kathy Manning
7th	54.5%	44.0%	David Rouzer
8th	49.2%	49.0%	Richard Hudson
9th	50.3%	48.4%	Dan Bishop
10th	63.7%	35.0%	Patrick McHenry
11th	52.2%	46.3%	Madison Cawthorn
12th	27.0%	71.0%	Alma Adams
13th	62.9%	35.9%	Ted Budd

== Analysis ==
=== Voter demographics ===
Voter demographic data was collected by CNN. The voter survey is based on exit polls. There were 4,557 total respondents.

2020 North Carolina gubernatorial election (CNN)
Demographic subgroup	Cooper	Forest	% of total vote
Ideology
Liberals	94	5	20
Moderates	69	29	39
Conservatives	13	86	40
Party
Democrats	97	2	34
Republicans	8	92	37
Independents	54	42	30
Age
18–24 years old	57	41	8
25–29 years old	54	39	6
30–39 years old	59	41	14
40–49 years old	55	43	16
50–64 years old	48	50	31
65 and older	46	53	24
Gender
Men	47	51	44
Women	55	43	56
Race/ethnicity
White	36	63	65
Black	92	7	23
Latino	59	38	5
Asian	N/A	N/A	2
Other	56	39	5
Gender by race
White men	33	66	29
White women	39	60	36
Black men	92	8	9
Black women	93	6	14
Latino men	45	53	3
Latino women	75	22	3
Other racial/ethnic groups	54	42	7
Education
Never attended college	41	58	18
Some college education	45	53	27
Associate degree	50	46	18
Bachelor's degree	58	41	22
Postgraduate	68	31	14
Education by race
White college graduated	54	45	26
White no college degree	24	74	39
Non-white college graduates	82	17	11
Non-white no college degree	79	19	25
Education by gender/race
White women with college degrees	59	41	15
White women without college degrees	24	74	21
White men with college degrees	48	52	11
White men without college degrees	24	75	18
Non-white	80	18	35
Income
Under $30K	53	45	15
$30K-$50k	55	43	22
$50k-$100k	50	47	36
$100k-$200k	48	51	22
$200k or more	48	52	5
Issue regarded as most important
Racial inequality	94	4	21
Health care policy	65	32	12
Economy	20	78	35
COVID-19 pandemic	84	15	14
Crime and safety	14	83	12
Region
East	48	51	23
Raleigh-Durham Triangle	65	34	22
Charlotte Area	57	42	18
Piedmont/Central	48	50	20
West	38	60	17
Area type
Urban	71	28	33
Suburban	43	56	40
Rural	42	55	27

== See also ==
- 2020 North Carolina elections
- 2020 North Carolina lieutenant gubernatorial election

== Notes ==
Partisan clients

General
