= Barney Paul Woodard =

American politician

Member of the North Carolina House of Representatives from the 14th district
- In office ???–1980

Member of the North Carolina House of Representatives
- In office ???–1992

Personal details
- Born: November 23, 1914 Princeton, North Carolina, U.S.
- Died: February 15, 1997 (aged 82)
- Party: Democratic
- Spouse: Annie Louise
- Children: 4
- Education: University of North Carolina at Chapel Hill

Barney Paul Woodard (November 23, 1914 – February 15, 1997) was an American politician. He served as a Democratic member of the North Carolina House of Representatives.

== Life and career ==
Woodard was born in Princeton, North Carolina, the son of Elizabeth Wall and John Richard Woodard. He attended Princeton High School and the University of North Carolina at Chapel Hill.

Woodard was owner of Woodard Drug Store. He was a member of the North Carolina House of Representatives, representing the 14th district until 1980.

Woodard died in February 1997, at the age of 82.
