= E. David Redwine =

American politician

Edward David Redwine (born September 12, 1947) is a North Carolina politician. He served in the North Carolina House of Representatives for almost 20 years and is a candidate in 2010 for the North Carolina Senate seat being vacated by R.C. Soles.

Redwine is a member of the board of trustees for East Carolina University, his alma mater, and he is a member of the board of directors for the North Carolina Turnpike Authority.
