= Norwood E. Bryan Jr. =

American politician

Member of the North Carolina House of Representatives
- In office 1967–1975

Personal details
- Born: January 10, 1935 (age 91)
- Party: Democratic
- Education: University of North Carolina at Chapel Hill; Yale University Law School

Norwood E. Bryan Jr. (born January 10, 1935) is an American politician. He served as a Democratic member of the North Carolina House of Representatives.

== Life and career ==
Bryan attended the University of North Carolina at Chapel Hill and Yale University Law School.

Bryan was a local businessman.

Bryan served in the North Carolina House of Representatives from 1967 to 1975.
