= Dewey L. Hill =

American politician (1925–2023)

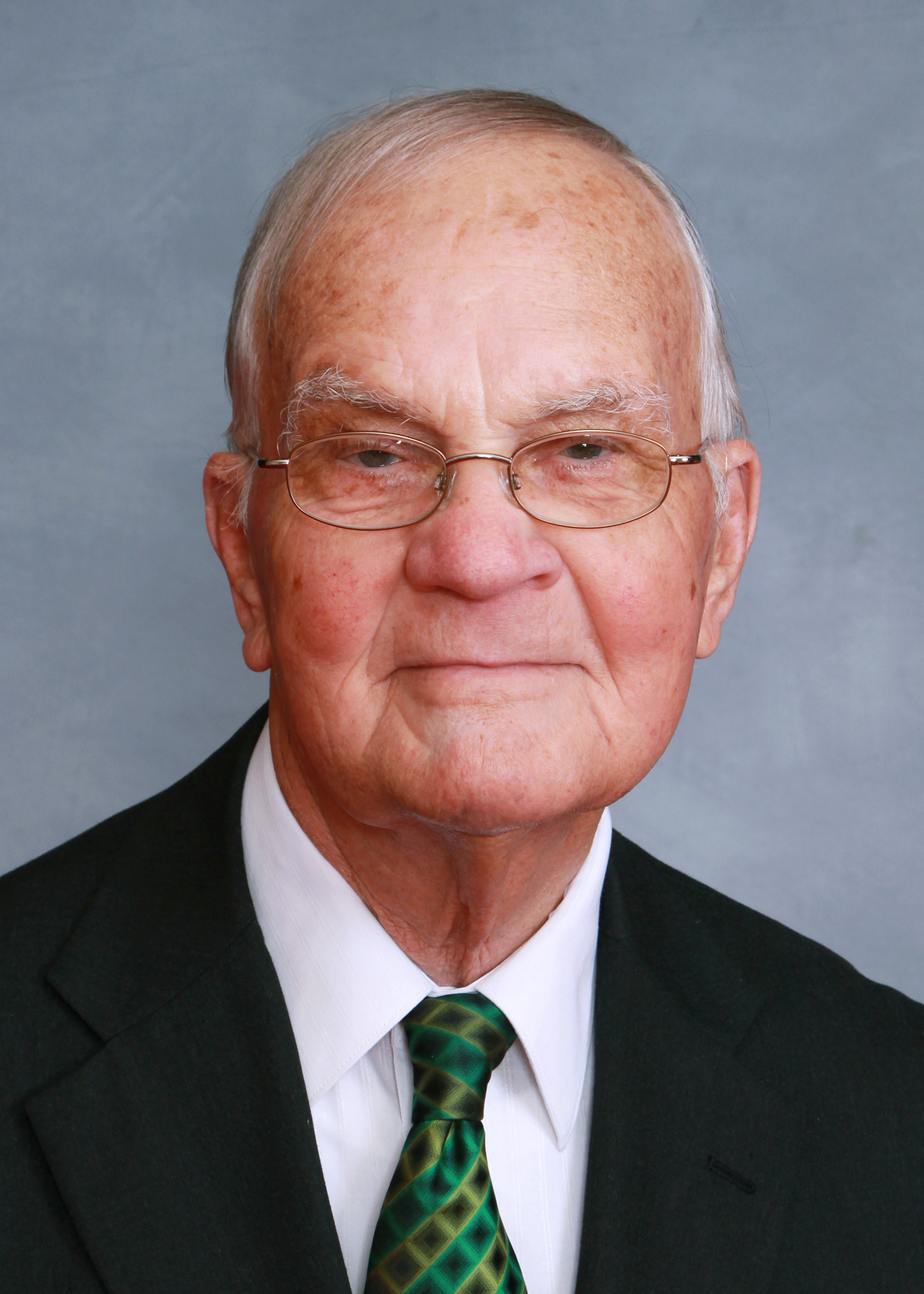

Member of the North Carolina House of Representatives from the 20th District
- In office 1992–2012

Personal details
- Born: Dewey Lewis Hill; August 31, 1925 Whiteville, North Carolina, U.S.
- Died: June 27, 2023 (aged 97)
- Party: Democratic
- Spouse: Muriel Ezzell
- Children: Two
- Occupation: Businessman

Dewey Lewis Hill (August 31, 1925 – June 27, 2023) was an American politician who was a Democratic member of the North Carolina General Assembly representing the state's 20th House district, including constituents in Brunswick and Columbus counties. Hill was a business executive from Whiteville.

In December 2011, Hill announced that he would not seek re-election in 2012.

Hill died on June 27, 2023, at the age of 97.
