= List of ICE field offices =

The US Immigration and Customs Enforcement (ICE) operates field offices in major cities throughout the United States and Puerto Rico, as well as internationally in other countries. As of 2025, only 25 of them were Enforcement and Removal Operation (ERO) offices.

== Domestic locations ==
=== Arizona ===
- Eloy - Office of the Principal Legal Advisor
- Florence - Office of the Principal Legal Advisor
- Phoenix - Office of the Principal Legal Advisor, Enforcement and Removal Operations, Community Relations Officer, Special Agent in Charge – West
- Scottsdale - Homeland Security Investigations
- Tucson - Office of the Principal Legal Advisor

=== California ===
- Adelanto - Office of the Principal Legal Advisor
- Imperial - Office of the Principal Legal Advisor
- Long Beach - Community Relations Officer
- Los Angeles - Office of the Principal Legal Advisor, Enforcement and Removal Operations, Community Relations Officer, Homeland Security Investigations
- Sacramento - Office of the Principal Legal Advisor
- San Diego - Office of the Principal Legal Advisor, Enforcement and Removal Operations, Community Relations Officer, Homeland Security Investigations
- San Francisco - Office of the Principal Legal Advisor, Enforcement and Removal Operations, Community Relations Officer, Homeland Security Investigations
- Santa Ana - Office of the Principal Legal Advisor

=== Colorado ===
- Centennial - Office of the Principal Legal Advisor, Enforcement and Removal Operations, Community Relations Officer
- Greenwood Village - Homeland Security Investigations

=== Connecticut ===
- Hartford - Office of the Principal Legal Advisor

=== District of Columbia ===
- Washington - ICE OPR Integrity Coordination Center

=== Florida ===
- Key West - Joint Interagency Task Force
- Miami - Office of the Principal Legal Advisor, Community Relations Officer, Homeland Security Investigations (Miami and Caribbean)
- Orlando - Office of the Principal Legal Advisor
- Plantation - Enforcement and Removal Operations
- Pompano Beach - Office of the Principal Legal Advisor
- Tampa - Community Relations Officer, Homeland Security Investigations

=== Georgia ===
- Atlanta - Office of the Principal Legal Advisor, Community Relations Officer, Homeland Security Investigations, Enforcement and Removal Operations
- Lumpkin - Office of the Principal Legal Advisor

=== Hawaii ===
- Honolulu - Office of the Principal Legal Advisor, Homeland Security Investigations

=== Illinois ===
- Chicago - Office of the Principal Legal Advisor, Community Relations Officer, Enforcement and Removal Operations
- Lombard - Homeland Security Investigations

=== Indiana ===
- Indianapolis - Office of the Principal Legal Advisor

=== Louisiana ===
- Jena - Office of the Principal Legal Advisor
- New Orleans - Office of the Principal Legal Advisor, Community Relations Officer, Enforcement and Removal Operations, Homeland Security Investigations
- Oakdale - Office of the Principal Legal Advisor

=== Maryland ===
- Baltimore - Office of the Principal Legal Advisor, Community Relations Officer, Enforcement and Removal Operations, Homeland Security Investigations

=== Massachusetts ===
- Boston - Office of the Principal Legal Advisor, Homeland Security Investigations
- Burlington - Community Relations Officer, Enforcement and Removal Operations

=== Michigan ===
- Detroit - Office of the Principal Legal Advisor, Homeland Security Investigations, Community Relations Officer, Enforcement and Removal Operations

=== Minnesota ===
- Fort Snelling - Office of the Principal Legal Advisor, Homeland Security Investigations, Community Relations Officer, Enforcement and Removal Operations

=== Missouri ===
- Kansas City - Office of the Principal Legal Advisor, Homeland Security Investigations

=== Nebraska ===
- Omaha - Office of the Principal Legal Advisor

=== Nevada ===
- Las Vegas - Office of the Principal Legal Advisor, Homeland Security Investigations
- Reno - Salt Lake City Field Office

=== New Jersey ===
- Elizabeth - Office of the Principal Legal Advisor
- Newark - Office of the Principal Legal Advisor, Homeland Security Investigations, Community Relations Officer, Enforcement and Removal Operations

=== New Mexico ===
- Chaparral - Office of the Principal Legal Advisor

=== New York ===
- Batavia - Office of the Principal Legal Advisor
- Buffalo - Office of the Principal Legal Advisor, Enforcement and Removal Operations, Community Relations Officer, Homeland Security Investigations
- New York City - Office of the Principal Legal Advisor, Enforcement and Removal Operations, Community Relations Officer, Homeland Security Investigations
- Newburgh - Office of the Principal Legal Advisor

=== North Carolina ===
- Charlotte - Office of the Principal Legal Advisor, Homeland Security Investigations

=== Ohio ===
- Brooklyn Heights - Office of the Principal Legal Advisor

=== Oregon ===
- Portland - Office of the Principal Legal Advisor

=== Pennsylvania ===
- Philadelphia - Office of the Principal Legal Advisor, Enforcement and Removal Operations, Community Relations Officer, Homeland Security Investigations
- York - Office of the Principal Legal Advisor

=== Puerto Rico ===
- Guaynabo - Office of the Principal Legal Advisor
- San Juan - Community Relations Officer, Homeland Security Investigations

=== Tennessee ===
- Memphis - Office of the Principal Legal Advisor
- Nashville - Homeland Security Investigations

=== Texas ===
- Conroe - Office of the Principal Legal Advisor
- Dallas - Enforcement and Removal Operations, Community Relations Officer
- Dilley - Office of the Principal Legal Advisor
- El Paso - Office of the Principal Legal Advisor, Enforcement and Removal Operations, Community Relations Officer, Homeland Security Investigations
- Harlingen - Office of the Principal Legal Advisor, Enforcement and Removal Operations, Community Relations Officer
- Houston - Office of the Principal Legal Advisor, Enforcement and Removal Operations, Community Relations Officer
- Irving - Office of the Principal Legal Advisor, Homeland Security Investigations
- Los Fresnos - Office of the Principal Legal Advisor
- Pearsall - Office of the Principal Legal Advisor
- San Antonio - Homeland Security Investigations, Office of Professional Responsibility, Special Agent in Charge – Central
- Spring - Homeland Security Investigations

=== Utah ===
- West Valley City - Office of the Principal Legal Advisor, Enforcement and Removal Operations

=== Vermont ===
- Williston - Law Enforcement Support Center

=== Virginia ===
- Annandale - Office of the Principal Legal Advisor
- Chantilly - Enforcement and Removal Operations, Community Relations Officer
- Fairfax - Office of Professional Responsibility
- Reston - Homeland Security Investigations
- Sterling - Office of the Principal Legal Advisor

=== Washington ===
- Seattle - Office of the Principal Legal Advisor, Enforcement and Removal Operations, Community Relations Officer, Homeland Security Investigations

== International ==
In addition to the Miami HSI conducting operations internationally in the Caribbean, American diplomatic missions sometimes host ICE operations.

=== Africa ===
- Consulate General of the United States, Casablanca – Homeland Security Investigations
- Embassy of the United States, Cairo – Homeland Security Investigations
- Embassy of the United States, Dakar – Homeland Security Investigations
- Embassy of the United States, Nairobi – Homeland Security Investigations
- Embassy of the United States, Pretoria – Homeland Security Investigations

=== Asia ===
- Embassy of the United States, Abu Dhabi – Homeland Security Investigations
- Embassy of the United States, Amman – Homeland Security Investigations
- Embassy of the United States, Ankara – Homeland Security Investigations
- Embassy of the United States, Bangkok – Homeland Security Investigations
- Embassy of the United States, Beijing – Homeland Security Investigations
- Consulate General of the United States, Guangzhou – Homeland Security Investigations
- Consulate General of the United States, Ho Chi Minh City – Homeland Security Investigations
- Consulate General of the United States, Hong Kong – Homeland Security Investigations
- Embassy of the United States, Islamabad – Homeland Security Investigations
- Consulate of the United States, Istanbul – Homeland Security Investigations
- Embassy of the United States, Jakarta – Homeland Security Investigations
- Consulate General of the United States, Jeddah – Homeland Security Investigations
- Consulate General of the United States, Dhahran – Homeland Security Investigations
- Embassy of the United States, Jerusalem – Homeland Security Investigations
- Embassy Branch Office of the United States, Tel Aviv – Homeland Security Investigations
- Embassy of the United States, Kuala Lumpur – Homeland Security Investigations
- Embassy of the United States, Manila – Homeland Security Investigations
- Embassy of the United States, Muscat – Homeland Security Investigations
- Embassy of the United States, New Delhi – Homeland Security Investigations
- Embassy of the United States, Phnom Penh – Homeland Security Investigations
- Embassy of the United States, Riyadh – Homeland Security Investigations
- Embassy of the United States, Seoul – Homeland Security Investigations
- Embassy of the United States, Singapore – Homeland Security Investigations
- Embassy of the United States, Tokyo – Homeland Security Investigations
- American Institute in Taiwan – Homeland Security Investigations

=== Europe ===
- Embassy of the United States, Athens – Homeland Security Investigations
- Embassy of the United States, Berlin – Homeland Security Investigations
- Consulate General of the United States, Frankfurt – Homeland Security Investigations
- Embassy of the United States, Brussels – Homeland Security Investigations Antwerp
- Embassy of the United States, Bucharest – Homeland Security Investigations
- Embassy of the United States, London – Homeland Security Investigations
- Embassy of the United States, Madrid – Homeland Security Investigations
- Embassy of the United States, Paris – Homeland Security Investigations
- Embassy of the United States, Rome – Homeland Security Investigations
- Embassy of the United States, The Hague (Rotterdam) – Homeland Security Investigations
- Embassy of the United States, Vienna – Homeland Security Investigations
- Embassy of the United States, Warsaw – Homeland Security Investigations

=== North America ===
- Consulate General of the United States, Calgary - Homeland Security Investigations
- Embassy of the United States, Freeport – Homeland Security Investigations Freeport and Nassau
- Embassy of the United States, Nassau – Homeland Security Investigations
- Embassy of the United States, Guatemala City – Homeland Security Investigations
- Embassy of the United States, Kingston – Homeland Security Investigations
- Embassy of the United States, Mexico City – Homeland Security Investigations
- Consulate General of the United States, Matamoros – Homeland Security Investigations
- Consulate General of the United States, Ciudad Juarez – Homeland Security Investigations
- Consulate General of the United States, Guadalajara – Homeland Security Investigations
- Consulate General of the United States, Hermosillo – Homeland Security Investigations
- Consulate General of the United States, Monterrey – Homeland Security Investigations
- Consulate General of the United States, Tijuana – Homeland Security Investigations
- Embassy of the United States, Ottawa – Homeland Security Investigations
- Consulate General of the United States, Montréal – Homeland Security Investigations
- Consulate General of the United States, Toronto – Homeland Security Investigations
- Consulate General of the United States, Vancouver – Homeland Security Investigations
- Embassy of the United States, Port-au-Prince – Homeland Security Investigations
- Embassy of the United States, Panama City – Homeland Security Investigations
- Embassy of the United States, San Salvador – Homeland Security Investigations
- Embassy of the United States, Santo Domingo – Homeland Security Investigations
- Embassy of the United States, Tegucigalpa – Homeland Security Investigations

=== South America ===
- Embassy of the United States, Bogota – Homeland Security Investigations
- U.S. Embassy Branch Office, Cartagena – Homeland Security Investigations
- Embassy of the United States, Brasília – Homeland Security Investigations
- Embassy of the United States, Buenos Aires – Homeland Security Investigations
- Embassy of the United States, Lima – Homeland Security Investigations
- Embassy of the United States, Quito – Homeland Security Investigations

=== Oceania ===
- Embassy of the United States, Canberra – Homeland Security Investigations

== See also ==
- List of immigrant detention sites in the United States
- List of FBI Enforcement and Removal Operations
- List of ATF field divisions
- List of United States Secret Service Enforcement and Removal Operations
