= William M. Brawley =

American politician from North Carolina

Bill Brawley
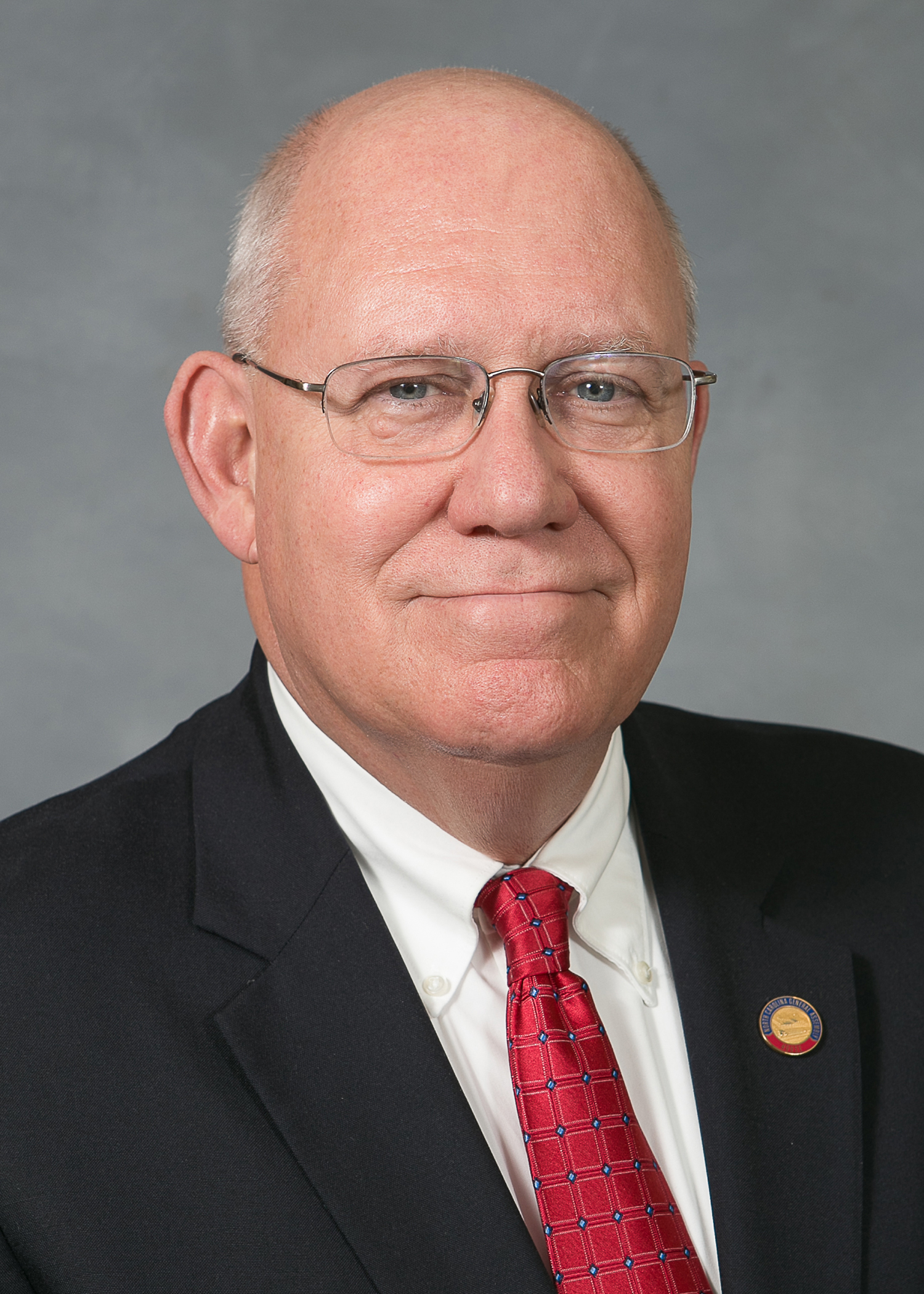

Member of the North Carolina House of Representatives from the 103rd district
- In office January 1, 2011 – January 1, 2019
- Preceded by: Jim Gulley
- Succeeded by: Rachel Hunt

Personal details
- Born: William M. Brawley; August 30, 1949 (age 76)
- Party: Republican

William M. Brawley (born August 30, 1949) is a Republican former member of the North Carolina House of Representatives. He represented the 103rd district.

== North Carolina House of Representatives ==
Brawley voted for the 2017 budget that kept teacher pay at $35,000. Brawley also voted for the 2016 budget that provided tax cuts to corporations over education funding.

Brawley supported a controversial plan that would add toll lanes to I-77 in Charlotte. In 2015, Brawley voted for a bill that will add toll lanes to I-485 and US 74 by 2019.

In 2015, Brawley voted for a bill that would block the Medicaid expansion. The Medicaid expansion would provide healthcare for 500,000 low-income North Carolinians.

Brawley sponsored a bill that would make it more difficult for towns to inspect residential properties for unsafe conditions.

In 2017, Brawley sponsored a bill that would establish a committee to analyze the impact of breaking up large school districts. The committee found that breaking up the district would cause resegregation, disrupt bus routes, and cause legal issues. In 2018, Brawley voted for a bill that would create allow four majority-white suburban towns in Charlotte to create their own charter schools. This bill was criticized by the North Carolina NAACP President, Anthony Spearman, saying this was an attempt to create "Jim Crow independent school districts".

Brawley voted for a bill that would allow landfill operators to spray landfill fluids, called leachate, into the air. In 2014, Brawley voted for a bill that would allow Duke Energy to clean up their coal ash spill. In 2017, Brawley voted to cut funding from the NC Department of Environmental Quality, days after the GenX story broke.

Brawley was defeated for re-election in 2018 by Democrat Rachel Hunt. He lost a rematch against Hunt in 2020. In 2022, Brawley again ran as the Republican nominee for the 103rd district, this time losing to Democrat Laura Budd.

=== Electoral history ===
==== 2020 ====
North Carolina House of Representatives 103rd district general election, 2020
Party	Candidate	Votes	%
Democratic	Rachel Hunt (incumbent)	26,818	54.93%
Republican	Bill Brawley	22,008	45.07%
Total votes		48,826	100%
Democratic hold			

==== 2018 ====
North Carolina House of Representatives 103rd district general election, 2018
Party	Candidate	Votes	%
Democratic	Rachel Hunt	19,133	50.09%
Republican	Bill Brawley (incumbent)	19,065	49.91%
Total votes		38,198	100%
Democratic gain from Republican			

==== 2016 ====
North Carolina House of Representatives 103rd district general election, 2016
Party	Candidate	Votes	%
Republican	Bill Brawley (incumbent)	21,702	56.19%
Democratic	Rochelle Rivas	16,922	43.81%
Total votes		38,624	100%
Republican hold			

==== 2014 ====
North Carolina House of Representatives 103rd district general election, 2014
Party	Candidate	Votes	%
Republican	Bill Brawley (incumbent)	15,641	100%
Total votes		15,641	100%
Republican hold			

==== 2012 ====
North Carolina House of Representatives 103rd district general election, 2012
Party	Candidate	Votes	%
Republican	Bill Brawley (incumbent)	25,477	100%
Total votes		25,477	100%
Republican hold			

==== 2010 ====
North Carolina House of Representatives 103rd district Republican primary election, 2010
Party	Candidate	Votes	%
Republican	Bill Brawley	1,602	57.23%
Republican	Lloyd Austin	1,197	42.77%
Total votes		2,799	100%

North Carolina House of Representatives 103rd district general election, 2010
Party	Candidate	Votes	%
Republican	Bill Brawley	13,790	56.01%
Democratic	Ann Newman	10,830	43.99%
Total votes		24,620	100%
Republican hold			

North Carolina House of Representatives
Preceded by Jim Gulley	Member of the North Carolina House of Representatives from the 103rd district 2011–2019	Succeeded by Rachel Hunt
