= Rachel Hunt =

American politician (born 1965)

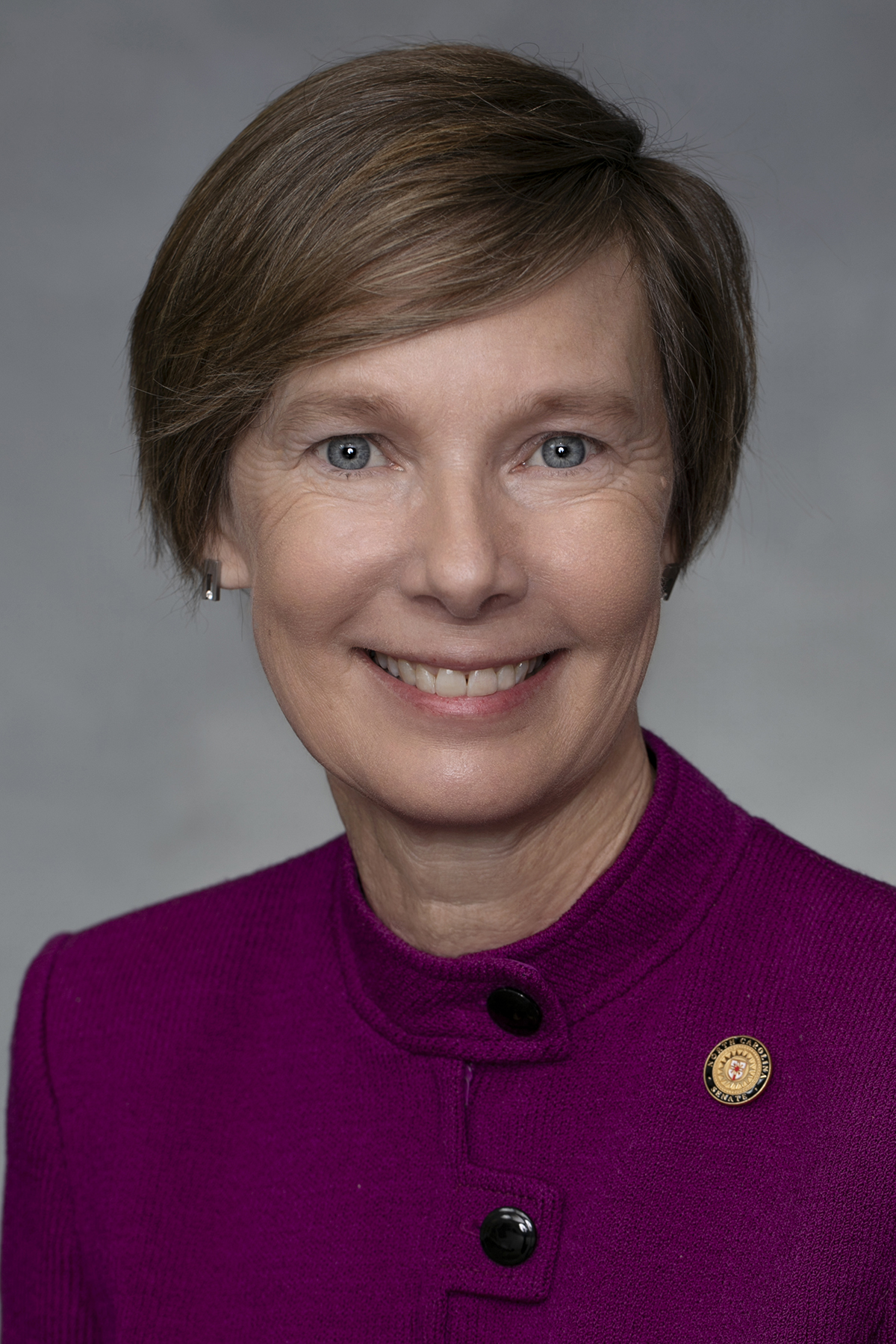
- Official portrait, 2023

36th Lieutenant Governor of North Carolina
- Incumbent
- Assumed office January 1, 2025
- Governor: Josh Stein
- Preceded by: Mark Robinson

Member of the North Carolina Senate from the 42nd district
- In office January 1, 2023 – January 1, 2025
- Preceded by: Jeff Jackson (redistricted)
- Succeeded by: Woodson Bradley

Member of the North Carolina House of Representatives from the 103rd district
- In office January 1, 2019 – January 1, 2023
- Preceded by: Bill Brawley
- Succeeded by: Laura Budd

Personal details
- Born: Rachel Henderson Hunt; May 19, 1965 (age 61) Kathmandu, Nepal
- Party: Democratic
- Spouse: Olav Nilender
- Children: 2
- Parents: Jim Hunt (father); Carolyn Leonard (mother)
- Relatives: Baxter Hunt (brother)
- Education: University of North Carolina, Chapel Hill (BA); University of South Carolina (JD)

Rachel Henderson Hunt (born May 19, 1965) is an American politician serving as the 36th lieutenant governor of North Carolina since 2025 under Governor Josh Stein. A Democrat, Hunt previously was a member of the North Carolina State Senate, having been elected in November 2022 to represent the 42nd district, based in Mecklenburg County. Previously, she served two terms in the North Carolina House, twice defeating Republican Bill Brawley.

Hunt is the daughter of former Governor and Lieutenant Governor Jim Hunt, and is also regarded as the main heir to his legacy. She is also the second woman to serve as lieutenant governor of the state, following Bev Perdue.

== Early life and education ==
Hunt, the daughter of governor Jim Hunt and Carolyn Hunt, was born on May 19, 1965, in Kathmandu, Nepal, where her father was working for the Ford Foundation at the time. She and her brother, Baxter Hunt, grew up in rural Wilson County, North Carolina, until her father was elected governor in 1976. An attorney and certified college counselor, she is a graduate of the University of North Carolina at Chapel Hill and the University of South Carolina School of Law.

== Legislative career ==
=== Elections ===
Hunt was first elected to the North Carolina House of Representatives in 2018, after defeating Republican incumbent William M. Brawley. The 2018 race was decided by only 68 votes after being one of the most expensive legislative races in the state that year. Hunt was re-elected in 2020 by 9.86% in a rematch against Brawley. In 2022, Hunt was elected to the North Carolina Senate to replace Jeff Jackson who vacated the seat to run for the United States House of Representatives. On November 8, 2022, Hunt defeated Cheryl Russo in the race to represent the 42nd State district.

=== Tenure ===
Despite serving in the minority, Hunt helped pass several pieces of bipartisan legislation including clean energy legislation to cut carbon emissions by 70%. Hunt has also co-sponsored bills to codify Roe v. Wade and expand Medicaid.

=== Committee assignments ===
Hunt served on several committees during her time in the North Carolina General Assembly.

During the 2019–2020 state house session, Hunt served on the Appropriations (Capital subcommittee), as well as the Education (Community Colleges subcommittee); Agriculture; Families, Children, and Aging Policy; and Judiciary committees.

During the 2021–2022 state house session, Hunt was on the Appropriations Committee (Education subcommittee). She also served as vice chair of the Education Committee (Community Colleges subcommittee), and was a member of the Education (K–12 subcommittee); Families, Children, and Aging Policy; and Judiciary I committees.

During the 2023–2024 state senate session, she was a member of the Agriculture, Energy, and Environment Committee; the Appropriations on General Government and Information Technology Committee; the Judiciary Committee; and the Pensions, Retirement, and Aging Committee.

== Lieutenant Governor of North Carolina ==
=== Elections ===
==== 2024 ====
North Carolina lieutenant governor election results for 2024 by county

In 2024, Hunt ran as the Democratic nominee for the office of Lieutenant Governor of North Carolina. Endorsed by Governor Roy Cooper, she ran on a platform of expanded funding for public education, increased healthcare access, and assistance to small businesses. In the general election she faced Republican political consultant Hal Weatherman. She cast Weatherman as an extremist and opposed more restrictions on abortion, of which Weatherman was in favor. Hunt won the election, becoming the first Democrat to win a North Carolina lieutenant gubernatorial race since 2008.

=== Tenure ===
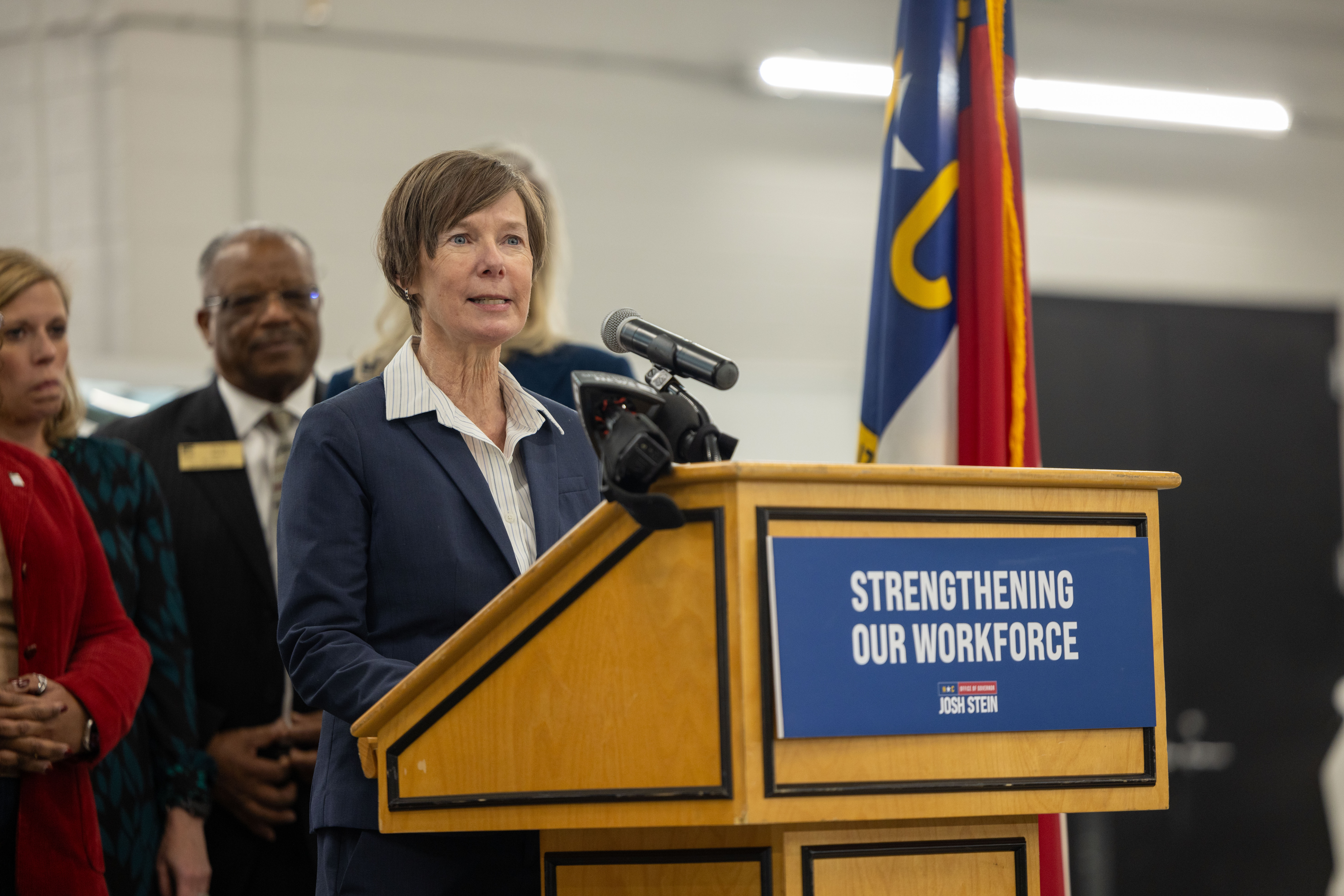
Hunt Speaking at the Hendrick Center in 2025.

Hunt was officially sworn in as Lieutenant Governor of North Carolina on January 1, 2025. With this position, Hunt is currently the only elected official in North Carolina to have powers in both the legislative and executive branches of state government.

When Hunt's office was moving into the Hawkins-Hartness House, they noticed that some of the rooms were left empty, with many of the house's chairs, tables, lamps, and other items missing. State agencies began replacing the furniture for Hunt's team, and she filed a budget request with the North Carolina Office of State Budget and Management requesting $97,000 for new furnishings and carpeting and $115,000 for improved security on the house. Hunt expressed a desire to reopen the house for events and public tours, as former lieutenant governor Dan Forest had done.

Governor Josh Stein appointed Hunt to co-chair a new Task Force for Child Care and Early Education in 2025.

== Personal life ==
Hunt lives in Charlotte, North Carolina. She has been married, since August 1, 1994, to Olav Nilender, a physician. Together they have two children.

== Electoral history ==
=== North Carolina House of Representatives ===
North Carolina House of Representatives 103rd district general election, 2018
Party	Candidate	Votes	%
Democratic	Rachel Hunt	19,133	50.09%
Republican	Bill Brawley (incumbent)	19,065	49.91%
Total votes		38,198	100%
Democratic gain from Republican			

North Carolina House of Representatives 103rd district general election, 2020
Party	Candidate	Votes	%
Democratic	Rachel Hunt (incumbent)	26,818	54.93%
Republican	Bill Brawley	22,008	45.07%
Total votes		48,826	100%
Democratic hold			

=== North Carolina Senate ===
North Carolina Senate 42nd district general election, 2022
Party	Candidate	Votes	%
Democratic	Rachel Hunt	47,621	54.96%
Republican	Cheryl Russo	39,024	45.04%
Total votes		86,645	100%
Democratic hold			

=== Lieutenant Governor ===
North Carolina Lieutenant Governor general election, 2024
Party	Candidate	Votes	%
Democratic	Rachel Hunt	2,737,528	49.44%
Republican	Hal Weatherman	2,643,943	47.75%
Libertarian	Shannon W. Bray	102,468	1.85%
Constitution	Wayne Jones	53,057	0.96%
Total votes		5,536,996	100%
Democratic gain from Republican			

North Carolina House of Representatives
Preceded by William M. Brawley	Member of the North Carolina House of Representatives from the 103rd district 2019–2023	Succeeded by Laura Budd
North Carolina Senate
Preceded by Dean Proctor	Member of the North Carolina Senate from the 42nd district 2023–2025	Succeeded by Woodson Bradley
Party political offices
Preceded by Yvonne Lewis Holley	Democratic nominee for Lieutenant Governor of North Carolina; 2024	Most recent
Political offices
Preceded by Mark Robinson	Lieutenant Governor of North Carolina; 2025–present	Incumbent
