= North Carolina's 103rd House district =

American legislative district

North Carolina's 103rd State House of Representatives district
Representative
Laura Budd; D–Matthews
- Demographics: 52% White; 12% Black; 13% Hispanic; 15% Asian; 1% Other; 7% Multiracial
- Population (2024): 90,299

North Carolina's 103rd House district is one of 120 districts in the North Carolina House of Representatives. It has been represented by Democrat Laura Budd since 2023.

== Geography ==
Since 2003, the district has included part of Mecklenburg County. The district overlaps with the 39th and 42nd Senate districts.

== District officeholders ==
Representative	Party	Dates	Notes	Counties
District created January 1, 2003.				2003–Present; Part of Mecklenburg County.
Jim Gulley (Matthews)	Republican	January 1, 2003 – January 1, 2011	Redistricted from the 69th district. Retired.	2003–Present; Part of Mecklenburg County.
Bill Brawley (Matthews)	Republican	January 1, 2011 – January 1, 2019	Lost re-election.	2003–Present; Part of Mecklenburg County.
Rachel Hunt (Charlotte)	Democratic	January 1, 2019 – January 1, 2023	Retired to run for State Senate.	2003–Present; Part of Mecklenburg County.
Laura Budd (Matthews)	Democratic	January 1, 2023 – Present		2003–Present; Part of Mecklenburg County.

== Election results ==
=== 2024 ===
North Carolina House of Representatives 103rd district general election, 2024
Party	Candidate	Votes	%
Democratic	Laura Budd (incumbent)	25,772	58.07%
Republican	Joshua Niday	18,609	41.93%
Total votes		44,381	100%
Democratic hold			

=== 2022 ===
North Carolina House of Representatives 103rd district Democratic primary election, 2022
Party	Candidate	Votes	%
Democratic	Laura Budd	2,994	56.99%
Democratic	Ann Harlan	2,260	43.01%
Total votes		5,254	100%

North Carolina House of Representatives 103rd district general election, 2022
Party	Candidate	Votes	%
Democratic	Laura Budd	20,200	52.48%
Republican	Bill Brawley	18,294	47.52%
Total votes		38,494	100%
Democratic hold			

=== 2020 ===
North Carolina House of Representatives 103rd district general election, 2020
Party	Candidate	Votes	%
Democratic	Rachel Hunt (incumbent)	26,818	54.93%
Republican	Bill Brawley	22,008	45.07%
Total votes		48,826	100%
Democratic hold			

=== 2018 ===
North Carolina House of Representatives 103rd district general election, 2018
Party	Candidate	Votes	%
Democratic	Rachel Hunt	19,133	50.09%
Republican	Bill Brawley (incumbent)	19,065	49.91%
Total votes		38,198	100%
Democratic gain from Republican			

=== 2016 ===
North Carolina House of Representatives 103rd district Democratic primary election, 2016
Party	Candidate	Votes	%
Democratic	Rochelle Rivas	3,248	50.10%
Democratic	Noah Lieberman	3,235	49.90%
Total votes		6,483	100%

North Carolina House of Representatives 103rd district general election, 2016
Party	Candidate	Votes	%
Republican	Bill Brawley (incumbent)	21,702	56.19%
Democratic	Rochelle Rivas	16,922	43.81%
Total votes		38,624	100%
Republican hold			

=== 2014 ===
North Carolina House of Representatives 103rd district general election, 2014
Party	Candidate	Votes	%
Republican	Bill Brawley (incumbent)	15,641	100%
Total votes		15,641	100%
Republican hold			

=== 2012 ===
North Carolina House of Representatives 103rd district general election, 2012
Party	Candidate	Votes	%
Republican	Bill Brawley (incumbent)	25,477	100%
Total votes		25,477	100%
Republican hold			

=== 2010 ===
North Carolina House of Representatives 103rd district Republican primary election, 2010
Party	Candidate	Votes	%
Republican	Bill Brawley	1,602	57.23%
Republican	Lloyd Austin	1,197	42.77%
Total votes		2,799	100%

North Carolina House of Representatives 103rd district general election, 2010
Party	Candidate	Votes	%
Republican	Bill Brawley	13,790	56.01%
Democratic	Ann Newman	10,830	43.99%
Total votes		24,620	100%
Republican hold			

=== 2008 ===
North Carolina House of Representatives 103rd district Republican primary election, 2008
Party	Candidate	Votes	%
Republican	Jim Gulley (incumbent)	2,270	49.14%
Republican	Edith "Edy" Brotherton	1,209	26.17%
Republican	Larry Hale	1,140	24.68%
Total votes		4,619	100%

North Carolina House of Representatives 103rd district general election, 2008
Party	Candidate	Votes	%
Republican	Jim Gulley (incumbent)	20,798	69.37%
Independent	Mark Brody	9,184	30.63%
Total votes		29,982	100%
Republican hold			

=== 2006 ===
North Carolina House of Representatives 103rd district Republican primary election, 2006
Party	Candidate	Votes	%
Republican	Jim Gulley (incumbent)	724	69.15%
Republican	Larry Hale	323	30.85%
Total votes		1,047	100%

North Carolina House of Representatives 103rd district general election, 2006
Party	Candidate	Votes	%
Republican	Jim Gulley (incumbent)	9,267	57.90%
Democratic	Everette A. Passaly	6,738	42.10%
Total votes		16,005	100%
Republican hold			

=== 2004 ===
North Carolina House of Representatives 103rd district general election, 2004
Party	Candidate	Votes	%
Republican	Jim Gulley (incumbent)	18,195	57.32%
Democratic	Sid Sowers	12,463	39.26%
Libertarian	Stephen Burr	1,087	3.42%
Total votes		31,745	100%
Republican hold			

=== 2002 ===
North Carolina House of Representatives 103rd district Republican primary election, 2002
Party	Candidate	Votes	%
Republican	Jim Gulley (incumbent)	1,980	57.89%
Republican	K. Larry Hale	1,440	42.11%
Total votes		3,420	100%

North Carolina House of Representatives 103rd district general election, 2002
Party	Candidate	Votes	%
Republican	Jim Gulley (incumbent)	17,254	90.24%
Libertarian	Andy Grum	1,866	9.76%
Total votes		19,120	100%
Republican hold			
