= Jim Gulley =

American politician

Member of the North Carolina House of Representatives
- In office January 1, 1997 – January 1, 2011
- Preceded by: J. Shawn Lemmond
- Succeeded by: Bill Brawley
- Constituency: 69th District (1997-2003); 103rd District (2003-2011)

Personal details
- Born: James Monroe Gulley; May 10, 1939 Charlotte, North Carolina, U.S.
- Died: May 20, 2014 (aged 75)
- Party: Republican
- Spouse: Suzanne Hargett
- Children: 2
- Education: East Mecklenburg High School
- Alma mater: Charlotte College

James Monroe Gulley (May 10, 1939 – May 20, 2014) was a Republican member of the North Carolina General Assembly representing the state's 103rd House district, including constituents in Mecklenburg County. From Matthews, North Carolina, Gulley served seven terms in the state House.

He announced he would not run for reelection in 2010. His longtime friend and colleague on the Matthews Town Council, Bill Brawley, won a primary in May 2010 and is currently the State Representative for District 103.

== Biography ==
Jim Gulley was a native of Mecklenburg County, North Carolina. He graduated from East Mecklenburg High School and Charlotte College (now University of North Carolina at Charlotte) with a degree in electrical engineering. He was married to his high school sweetheart, Suzanne Hargett. He had two children and four grandchildren. All of them live in North Carolina. He worked for 19 years with The National Cash Register Company where he received several years of training in computers during the infancy of personal computers. He owned and operated Carolina Computer Systems of Charlotte for approximately 22 years. Gulley was a member of First Baptist Church in Matthews, where he taught Sunday school for several years. He coached football for the Matthews Athletic Association and served on the board of directors of the Matthews Volunteer Fire Department. Rep. Gulley was an avid sportsman, enjoying hunting and fishing in his spare time.

Gulley was first elected to the Matthews Town Council in 1993 and served 1 1/2 terms prior to being elected to the State House of Representatives. He served on six committees, including Appropriations, Energy and Energy Efficiency, Public Utilities, Science and Technology, Ways & Means & Broadband Connectivity, and Wildlife Resources. Gulley was a Chair of the House Wildlife Resources Committee.

Jim Gulley died on May 20, 2014, after a long illness.

== Electoral history ==
=== 2008 ===
North Carolina House of Representatives 103rd district Republican primary election, 2008
Party	Candidate	Votes	%
Republican	Jim Gulley (incumbent)	2,270	49.14%
Republican	Edith "Edy" Brotherton	1,209	26.17%
Republican	Larry Hale	1,140	24.68%
Total votes		4,619	100%

North Carolina House of Representatives 103rd district general election, 2008
Party	Candidate	Votes	%
Republican	Jim Gulley (incumbent)	20,798	69.37%
Unaffiliated	Mark Brody	9,184	30.63%
Total votes		29,982	100%
Republican hold			

=== 2006 ===
North Carolina House of Representatives 103rd district Republican primary election, 2006
Party	Candidate	Votes	%
Republican	Jim Gulley (incumbent)	724	69.15%
Republican	Larry Hale	323	30.85%
Total votes		1,047	100%

North Carolina House of Representatives 103rd district general election, 2006
Party	Candidate	Votes	%
Republican	Jim Gulley (incumbent)	9,267	57.90%
Democratic	Everette A. Passaly	6,738	42.10%
Total votes		16,005	100%
Republican hold			

=== 2004 ===
North Carolina House of Representatives 103rd district general election, 2004
Party	Candidate	Votes	%
Republican	Jim Gulley (incumbent)	18,195	57.32%
Democratic	Sid Sowers	12,463	39.26%
Libertarian	Stephen Burr	1,087	3.42%
Total votes		31,745	100%
Republican hold			

=== 2002 ===
North Carolina House of Representatives 103rd district Republican primary election, 2002
Party	Candidate	Votes	%
Republican	Jim Gulley (incumbent)	1,980	57.89%
Republican	K. Larry Hale	1,440	42.11%
Total votes		3,420	100%

North Carolina House of Representatives 103rd district general election, 2002
Party	Candidate	Votes	%
Republican	Jim Gulley (incumbent)	17,254	90.24%
Libertarian	Andy Grum	1,866	9.76%
Total votes		19,120	100%
Republican hold			

=== 2000 ===
North Carolina House of Representatives 69th district Republican primary election, 2000
Party	Candidate	Votes	%
Republican	Jim Gulley (incumbent)	2,282	56.70%
Republican	Debbie Ware	1,743	43.30%
Total votes		4,025	100%

North Carolina House of Representatives 69th district general election, 2000
Party	Candidate	Votes	%
Republican	Jim Gulley (incumbent)	26,404	90.79%
Libertarian	Dave Gable	2,678	9.21%
Total votes		29,082	100%
Republican hold			

North Carolina House of Representatives
Preceded by J. Shawn Lemmond	Member of the North Carolina House of Representatives from the 69th district 1997–2003	Succeeded by Pryor Gibson
Preceded by Constituency established	Member of the North Carolina House of Representatives from the 103rd district 2003–2011	Succeeded by Bill Brawley
