= Baxter Hunt =

American diplomat

United States Consul General in Toronto, Canada
- Incumbent
- Assumed office October 2023

Chargé d'Affaires at the United States Embassy in Chile
- In office January 2019 – August 10, 2020
- Succeeded by: Richard Glenn

Personal details
- Born: James Baxter Hunt III
- Party: Democratic
- Children: James Hunt (son)
- Parents: Jim Hunt (father); Carolyn Leonard (mother)
- Relatives: Rachel Hunt (sister)
- Education: University of North Carolina, Chapel Hill (BA); Princeton University (MPA)

James Baxter Hunt III is an American diplomat who has served as the U.S. Consul General in Toronto, Canada since October 2023.

== Family and education ==
Hunt is the son of former North Carolina governor James Baxter Hunt Jr. and former first lady Carolyn Hunt. He is the brother of North Carolina Lieutenant Governor Rachel Hunt.

He earned a bachelor's degree from the University of North Carolina at Chapel Hill and a master's degree in public administration from the Woodrow Wilson School of Public and International Affairs at Princeton University.

He has three children, Lindsey, Stephanie, and James Hunt.

== Career ==
A career member of the Senior Foreign Service, Hunt served as Chargé d'Affaires at the US Embassy in Santiago, Chile, from January 2019 until August 10, 2020, when Richard Glenn assumed duties. Before that, he was Deputy Chief of Mission in Santiago (since August 2017), the Director of the International Narcotics and Law Enforcement section (2013-2014) and Deputy Executive Secretary in the Office of the Secretary of State (2015-2017). He also served abroad at the U.S. Embassies in Kabul, Afghanistan, Ottawa, Canada & Warsaw, Poland; & in the U.S. Consulate General in Durban, South Africa. While serving in Washington DC for domestic assignments, Hunt has served Director of the Office of Brazil and Southern Cone Affairs, in the Office of European and Eurasian Affairs as Director of the Office of Ukraine / Moldova / Belarus Affairs and Director of the Office of Caucasus Affairs and Regional Conflicts. and has also served in the Office of Population, Refugees, and Migration Affairs as Director for Assistance to Europe, Central Asia, and the Americas. Hunt also was special Assistant to Under Secretaries of State for Political Affairs Marc Grossman and Nicholas Burns.

Hunt was a Presidential Management Intern working in the U.S. State Department, the U.S. Department of Defense, and the U.S. National Security Council before entering the Foreign Service.

From January 2021 to June 2022, Hunt served as the acting Dean of the U.S. Foreign Service Institute's School of Professional and Area Studies (SPAS).

As of January 2026, Hunt still remains one of the U.S. Consul Generals to Canada, and is still based in the Toronto U.S. Consulate, where he has been based since October 2023.
