= List of FBI field offices =

The Federal Bureau of Investigation (FBI) operates 55 field offices in major cities throughout the United States and Puerto Rico. Many of these offices are further subdivided into smaller resident agencies that have jurisdiction over a specific area. These resident agencies are considered to be part of the primary field offices. FBI headquarters, located in Washington, D.C., controls the flow of the agents and support staff that work out of the field offices across the country. Each field office is overseen by a Special Agent in Charge (SAC), except those located in Los Angeles, New York City, and Washington, D.C., which due to their large size, are each managed by an Assistant Director in Charge (ADIC), assisted by SACs responsible for specific programs or departments. The FBI also has offices overseas otherwise known as legal attachés. The FBI international offices are usually in American embassies.

Map of the Federal Bureau of Investigation's field offices in the United States (the non-contiguous states of Alaska and Hawaii are displayed on the bottom left) and Puerto Rico (displayed on the bottom right)

== Alabama ==
- Birmingham: Serves the counties of Bibb, DeKalb, Lauderdale, St. Clair, Blount, Etowah, Lawrence, Shelby, Calhoun, Fayette, Limestone, Sumter, Cherokee, Franklin, Madison, Talladega, Clay, Greene, Marion, Tuscaloosa, Cleburne, Jackson, Marshall, Walker, Colbert, Jefferson, Morgan, Winston, Cullman, Lamar and Pickens. Four Resident Agencies in Florence, Gadsden, Huntsville and Tuscaloosa.
- Mobile: Serves the counties of Autauga, Coffee, Geneva, Monroe, Baldwin, Conecuh, Hale, Montgomery, Barbour, Coosa, Henry, Perry, Bullock, Covington, Houston, Pike, Butler, Crenshaw, Lee, Randolph, Chambers, Dale, Lowndes, Russell, Chilton, Dallas, Macon, Tallapoosa, Choctaw, Elmore, Marengo, Washington, Clarke, Escambia, Mobile and Wilcox. Resident Agencies in Auburn, Dothan, Monroeville, Montgomery, and Selma.

== Alaska ==
- Anchorage: Entire state. Resident Agencies in Fairbanks and Juneau.

== Arizona ==
- Phoenix: Entire State. Resident agencies in Flagstaff, Lake Havasu City, Lakeside, Sierra Vista, Tucson, and Yuma.

== Arkansas ==
- Little Rock: Entire state. Resident agencies in El Dorado, Fayetteville, Fort Smith, Hot Springs, Jonesboro, Marion, Pine Bluff and Texarkana.

== California ==
- Los Angeles: Serves the counties of Los Angeles, Orange, San Bernardino, San Luis Obispo, Santa Barbara, Riverside, and Ventura. Resident Agencies in Lancaster, LAX, Long Beach, Orange, Palm Springs, Riverside, Santa Maria, Ventura, Victorville and West Covina. Located inside the Wilshire Federal Building.
- Sacramento: Serves Yosemite National Park and the counties of Alpine, Amador, Butte, Calaveras, Colusa, El Dorado, Fresno, Glenn, Inyo, Kern, Kings, Lassen, Madera, Merced, Mariposa, Modoc, Mono, Nevada, Placer, Plumas, Sacramento, San Joaquin, Shasta, Sierra, Siskiyou, Solano, Stanislaus, Sutter, Tehama, Trinity, Tulare, Tuolumne, Yolo, and Yuba. Resident agencies in Bakersfield, Chico, Fairfield, Fresno, Redding, South Lake Tahoe, and Stockton
- San Diego: Serves the counties of Imperial and San Diego. Resident agencies in Imperial and North County.
- San Francisco: Serves the counties of: Alameda, Contra Costa, Del Norte, Humboldt, Lake, Marin, Mendocino, Monterey, Napa, San Benito, San Francisco, Santa Clara, Santa Cruz, San Mateo and Sonoma. Resident agencies in Concord, Fortuna, Monterey Bay, Oakland, Palo Alto, San Jose and Santa Rosa.

== Colorado ==
- Denver: Serves all counties and the state of Wyoming. Resident agencies in Casper, Cheyenne, Colorado Springs, Durango, Fort Collins, Glenwood Springs, Grand Junction, Jackson Hole, Lander and Pueblo.

== Connecticut ==
- New Haven: Entire state. Resident agencies in Bridgeport, Meriden and New London.

== Florida ==
- Jacksonville: Serves the counties of Alachua, Baker, Bay, Bradford, Calhoun, Citrus, Clay, Columbia, Dixie, Duval, Escambia, Flagler, Franklin, Gadsden, Gilchrist, Gulf, Hamilton, Holmes, Jackson, Jefferson, Lafayette, Lake, Leon, Levy, Liberty, Madison, Marion, Nassau, Okaloosa, Putnam, St. Johns, Santa Rosa, Sumter, Suwannee, Taylor, Union, Volusia, Wakulla, Walton, and Washington. Resident agencies in Daytona Beach, Fort Walton Beach, Gainesville, Ocala, Panama City, Pensacola, and Tallahassee.
- Miami (Miramar): Serves the counties of Broward, Highlands, Indian River, Monroe, Palm Beach, Miami-Dade, Martin, Okeechobee, and St. Lucie. Resident agencies in Fort Pierce, Homestead, Key West and West Palm Beach.
- Tampa: Serves the counties of Brevard, Charlotte, Collier, De Soto, Glades, Hardee, Hendry, Hernando, Hillsborough, Lee, Manatee, Orange, Osceola, Pasco, Pinellas, Polk, Sarasota, and Seminole. Resident agencies in Clearwater, Fort Myers, Lakeland, Melbourne, Naples, Orlando and Sarasota.

== Georgia ==
- Atlanta (DeKalb County): Entire state. Resident agencies in Albany, Athens, Augusta, Brunswick, Columbus, Dalton, Gainesville, Hartsfield-Jackson International Airport, Macon, Rome, Savannah, Statesboro, Thomasville and Valdosta.

The field office's current location, on the grounds of Mercer University Atlanta Campus, opened in 2017. The office was previously located in Chamblee.

== Hawaii ==
- Honolulu (Kapolei): Serves all counties, the US territories of American Samoa, and Guam, and the Northern Marianas. Resident agencies in Kona, Mongmong-Toto-Maite, Saipan, Wailuku, and Pago Pago.

== Illinois ==
- Chicago: Serves the counties of Boone, Grundy, La Salle, Whiteside, Carroll, Jo Daviess, Lee, Will, Cook, Kane, McHenry, Winnebago, De Kalb, Kendall, Ogle, Du Page, Lake, and Stephenson. Resident agencies in Lisle, Orland Park, Rockford, and Schaumburg.
- Springfield: Adams, Brown, Cass, Christian, DeWitt, Greene, Logan, Macon, Macoupin, Mason, Menard, Montgomery, Morgan, Pike, Sangamon, Schuyler, Scott, Champaign, Clark, Coles, Crawford, Cumberland, Douglas, Edgar, Ford, Iroquois, Jasper, Kankakee, Moultrie, Piatt, Shelby, Vermilion, Bond, Calhoun, Clinton, Effingham, Fayette, Jersey, Madison, Marion, Monroe, Randolph, St. Clair, Washington, Alexander, Clay, Edwards, Franklin, Gallatin, Hamilton, Hardin, Jackson, Jefferson, Johnson, Lawrence, Massac, Perry, Pope, Pulaski, Richland, Saline, Union, Wabash, Wayne, White, Williamson, Fulton, Hancock, Livingston, Marshall, McDonough, McLean, Peoria, Putnam, Tazewell, Woodford, Bureau, Henderson, Henry, Knox, Mercer, Rock Island, Stark, and Warren. Resident agencies in Champaign, Decatur, Fairview Heights, Marion, Peoria and Quad Cities.

== Indiana ==
- Indianapolis: Entire state. Resident agencies in Bloomington, Evansville, Fort Wayne, Lafayette, Merrillville, Muncie, New Albany, South Bend and Terre Haute.

== Kentucky ==
- Louisville: Entire state. Resident agencies in Bowling Green, Covington, Hopkinsville, Lexington, London, Owensboro, Paducah and Pikeville.

== Louisiana ==
- New Orleans: Entire state. Resident agencies in Alexandria, Baton Rouge, Lafayette, Lake Charles, Monroe and Shreveport.

== Maryland ==
- Baltimore (Windsor Mill): Serves all counties and the state of Delaware. Resident agencies in Annapolis, Bel Air, Calverton, Dover, Frederick, Rockville, Salisbury, and Wilmington.

== Massachusetts ==
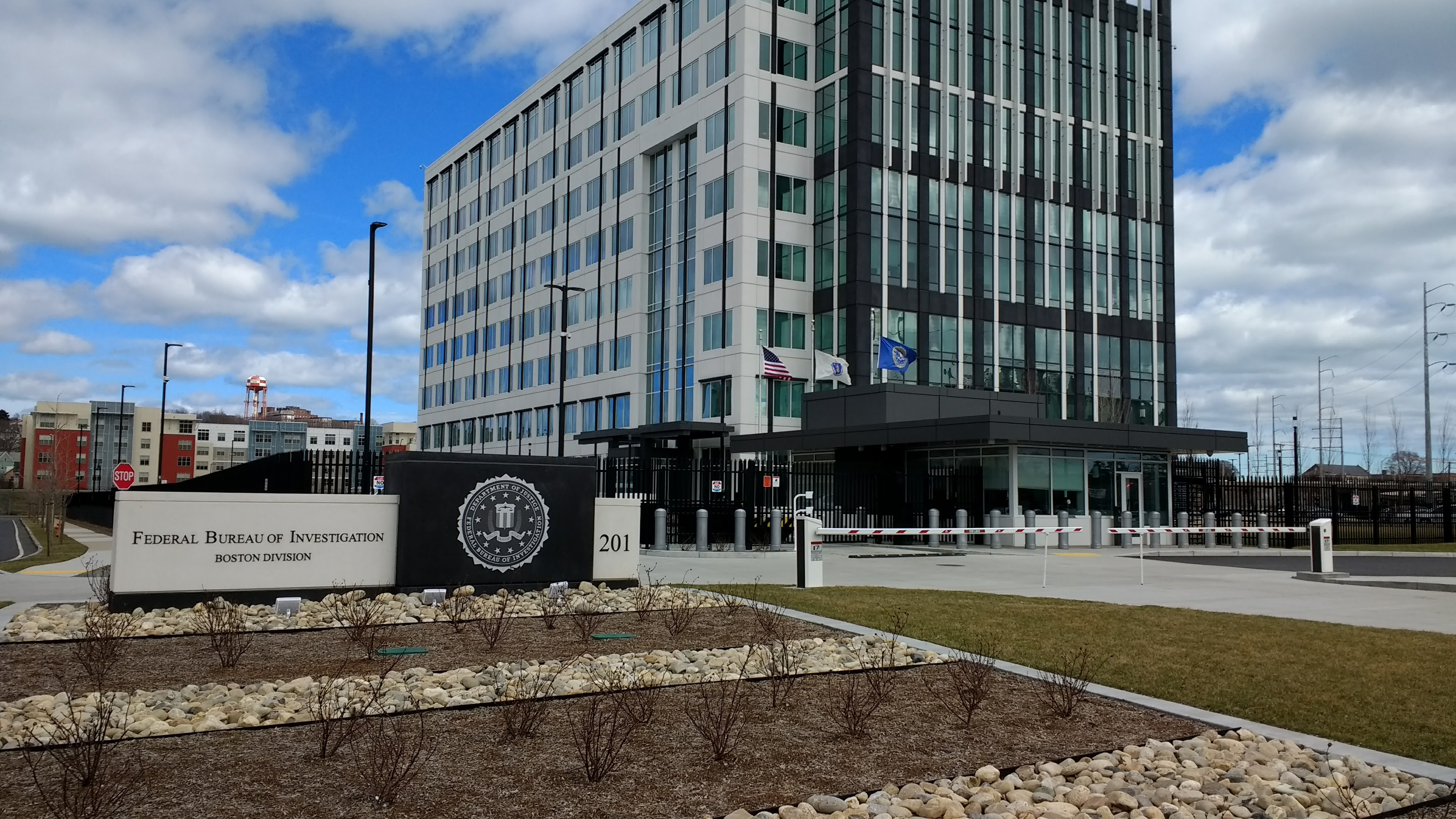
The FBI Field Office in Chelsea, Massachusetts.

- Boston (Chelsea): Serves all counties and the states of Maine, New Hampshire, and Rhode Island. Resident agencies in Augusta, Bangor, Bedford (NH), Lakeville (MA), Lowell (MA), Portland (ME), Portsmouth, Springfield, Providence (RI) and Worcester.

== Michigan ==
- Detroit: Entire state. Resident agencies in Ann Arbor, Bay City, Clinton Township, Flint, Grand Rapids, Kalamazoo, Lansing, Marquette, St. Joseph, Traverse City and Troy.

== Minnesota ==
- Minneapolis (Brooklyn Center): Serves all counties and the states of North Dakota and South Dakota. Fifteen resident agencies, in Aberdeen, Bemidji, Bismarck, Duluth, Fargo, Grand Forks, Mankato, Minot, Pierre, Rapid City, Rochester, Sioux Falls, St. Cloud and St. Paul.

== Mississippi ==
- Jackson: Entire state. Resident agencies in Columbus, Gulfport, Hattiesburg, Meridian, Oxford, Pascagoula, and Southaven.

== Missouri ==
- Kansas City: Serves the city of Kansas City and all of Kansas and the Missouri counties of Andrew, Atchison, Barry, Barton, Bates, Benton, Boone, Buchanan, Caldwell, Callaway, Camden, Carroll, Cass, Cedar, Christian, Clay, Clinton, Cole, Cooper, Dade, Dallas, Daviess, De Kalb, Douglas, Gentry, Greene, Grundy, Harrison, Henry, Hickory, Holt, Howard, Howell, Jackson, Jasper, Johnson, Laclede, Lafayette, Lawrence, Livingston, McDonald, Mercer, Miller, Moniteau, Morgan, Newton, Nodaway, Oregon, Osage, Ozark, Pettis, Platte, Polk, Pulaski, Putnam, Ray, Saline, St. Clair, Stone, Sullivan, Taney, Texas, Vernon, Webster, Worth and Wright. Resident agencies in Garden City, Jefferson City, Joplin, Manhattan, St. Joseph, Springfield, Topeka and Wichita.
- St. Louis: The city of St. Louis and the counties of Adair, Audrain, Bollinger, Butler, Cape Girardeau, Carter, Chariton, Clark, Crawford, Dent, Dunklin, Franklin, Gasconade, Iron, Jefferson, Knox, Lewis, Lincoln, Linn, Macon, Madison, Maries, Marion, Mississippi, Monroe, Montgomery, New Madrid, Pemiscot, Perry, Phelps, Pike, Ralls, Randolph, Reynolds, Ripley, Sainte Genevieve, Schuyler, Scotland, Scott, Shannon, Shelby, St. Charles, St. Francois, St. Louis, Stoddard, Warren, Washington and Wayne. Resident agencies in Cape Girardeau, Kirksville and Rolla.

== Montana ==
- Billings: Entire state. Resident agencies in Bozeman, Glasgow, Great Falls, Havre, Helena, Kalispell, Missoula, and Shelby.

== Nebraska ==
- Omaha: Serves all counties and the state of Iowa. Resident agencies in Cedar Rapids, Des Moines, Grand Island, Lincoln, North Platte, Quad Cities, Sioux City and Waterloo.

== Nevada ==
- Las Vegas: Entire state. Resident agencies in Elko, Reno and Stateline.

== New Jersey ==
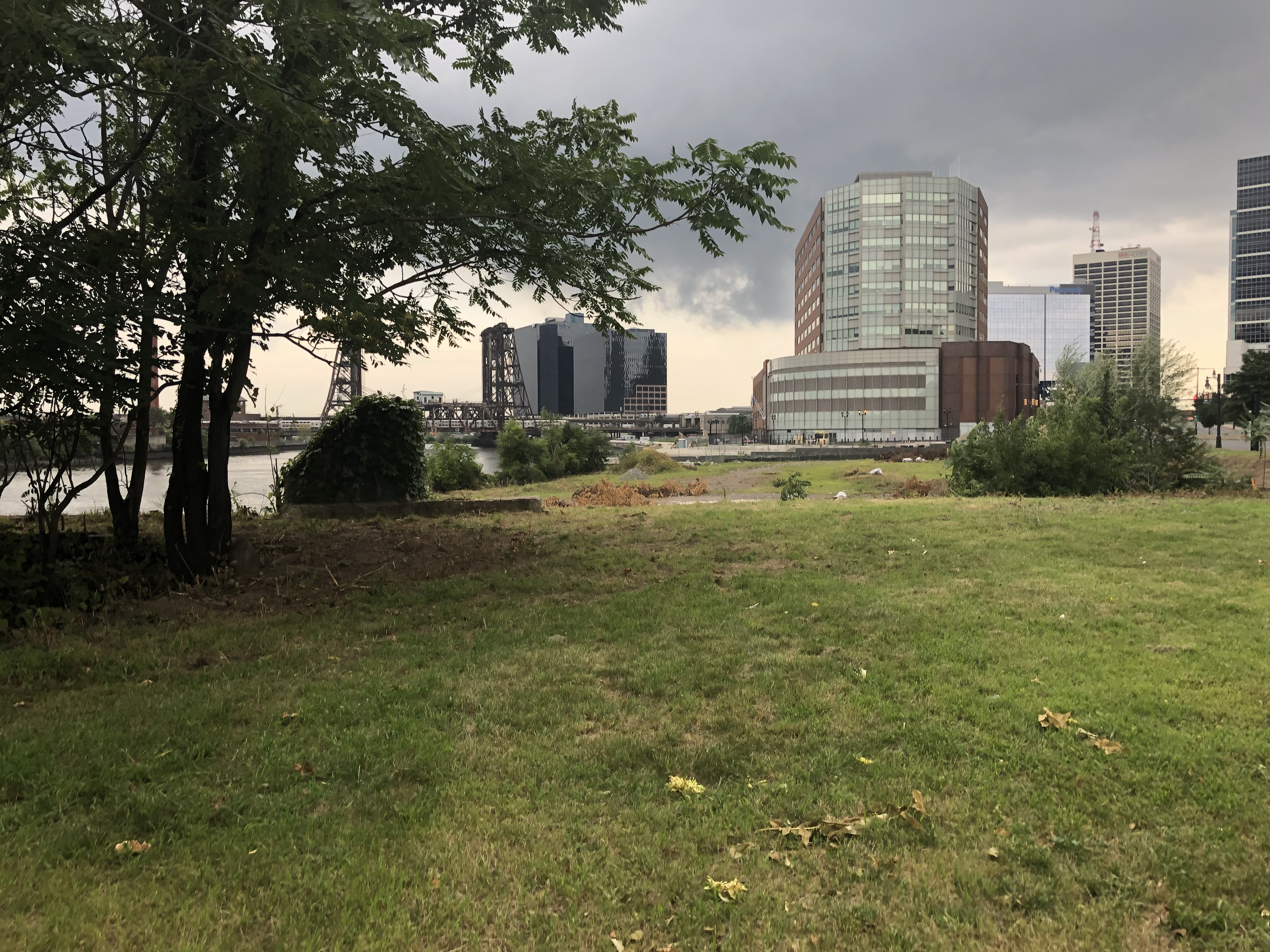
FBI field office on Passaic River in Newark

- Newark: Serves 18 counties. Camden, Gloucester, and Salem counties are handled by the Philadelphia field office. Resident agencies in Atlantic City, Franklin Township, Paterson, Red Bank and Trenton.

== New Mexico ==
- Albuquerque: Entire State. Resident agencies in Farmington, Gallup, Las Cruces, Roswell and Santa Fe.

== New York ==
- Albany: Serves all of Vermont and the New York Counties of Albany, Broome, Cayuga, Chenango, Clinton, Columbia, Cortland, Delaware, Essex, Franklin, Fulton, Greene, Hamilton, Herkimer, Jefferson, Lewis, Madison, Montgomery, Oneida, Onondaga, Oswego, Otsego, Rensselaer, Saratoga, Schenectady, Schoharie, St. Lawrence, Tioga, Tompkins, Ulster, Warren and Washington. Resident agencies in Binghamton, Burlington, Ithaca, Plattsburgh, Rutland, Syracuse and Utica.
- Buffalo: Serves the counties of Allegany, Cattaraugus, Chautauqua, Chemung, Erie, Genesee, Livingston, Monroe, Niagara, Ontario, Orleans, Schuyler, Seneca, Steuben, Wayne, Wyoming and Yates. Resident agencies in Elmira, Jamestown and Rochester.
- New York City (Jacob K. Javits Federal Building): Serves the City of New York (counties of the Bronx, New York, Richmond, Queens & Kings) and the counties of Dutchess, Nassau, Orange, Putnam, Rockland, Suffolk, Sullivan and Westchester. Resident agencies in Brooklyn, Goshen, JFK Airport, Melville and Rye (formerly located in White Plains).
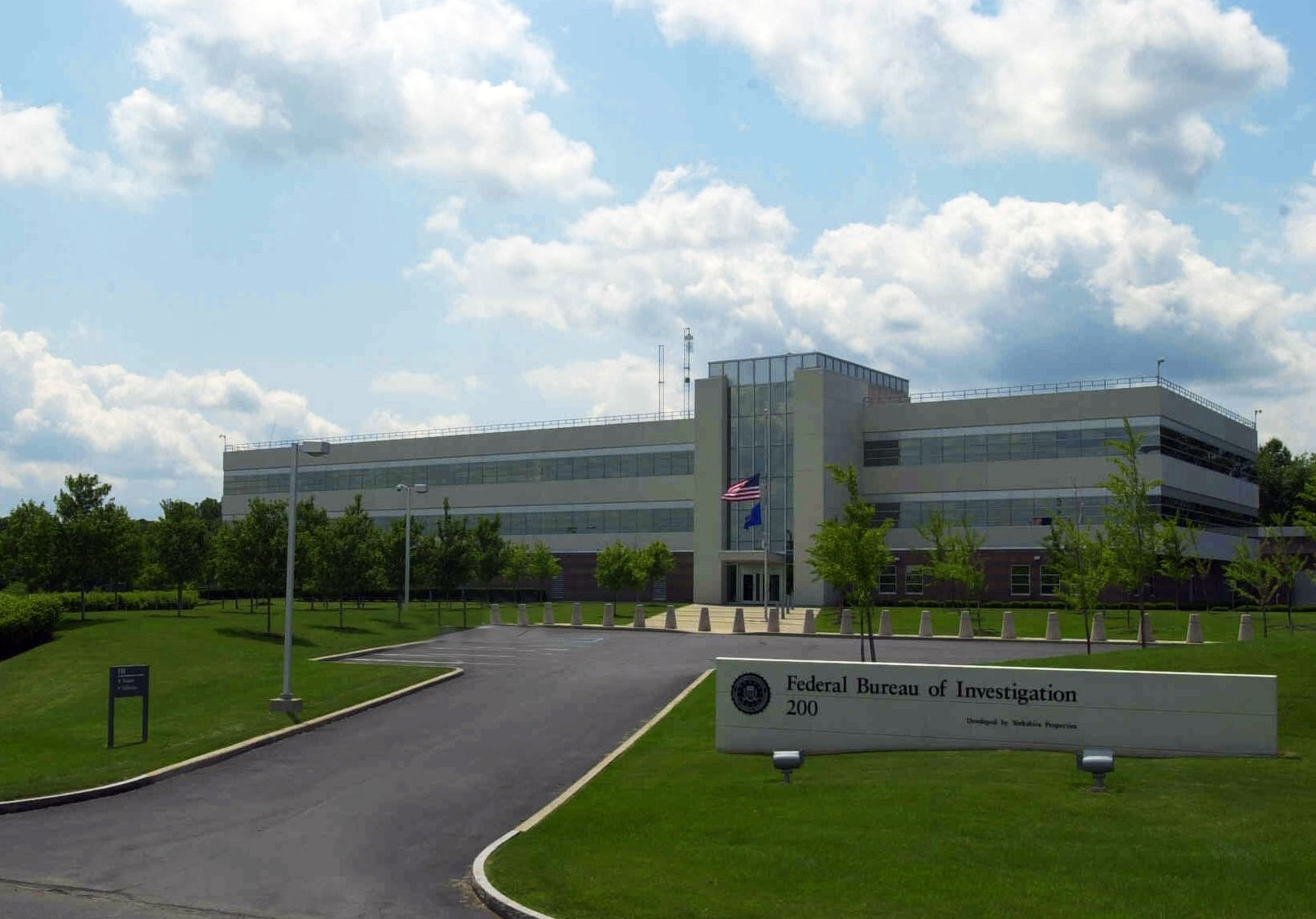
FBI Albany Field Office

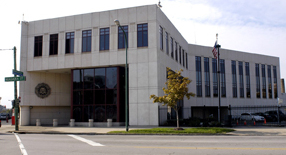
FBI Buffalo Field Office

== North Carolina ==
- Charlotte: Entire state. Resident agencies in Asheville, Fayetteville, Greensboro, Greenville, Hickory, Raleigh, and Wilmington.

== Ohio ==
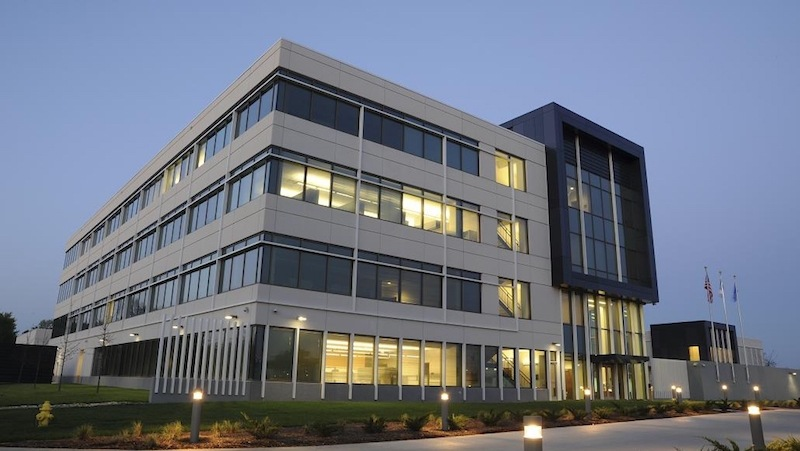
FBI Cincinnati Field Office

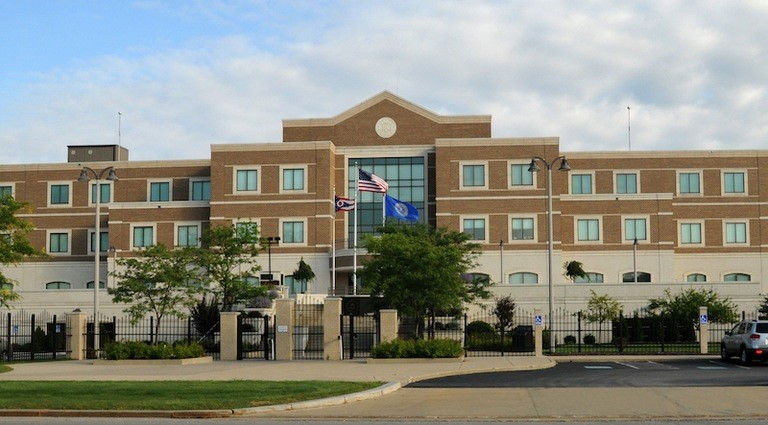
FBI Cleveland Field Office

- Cincinnati: Serves the counties of Adams, Athens, Belmont, Brown, Butler, Champaign, Clark, Clermont, Clinton, Coshocton, Darke, Delaware, Fairfield, Fayette, Franklin, Gallia, Greene, Guernsey, Hamilton, Harrison, Highland, Hocking, Jackson, Jefferson, Knox, Lawrence, Licking, Logan, Madison, Meigs, Miami, Monroe, Montgomery, Morgan, Morrow, Muskingum, Noble, Perry, Pickaway, Pike, Preble, Ross, Scioto, Shelby, Union, Vinton, Warren, and Washington. Resident agencies in Athens, Cambridge, Columbus, Dayton and Portsmouth.
- Cleveland: Serves the counties of Allen, Fulton, Mahoning, Seneca, Ashland, Geauga, Marion, Stark, Ashtabula, Hancock, Medina, Summit, Auglaize, Hardin, Mercer, Trumbull, Carroll, Henry, Ottawa, Tuscarawas, Columbiana, Holmes, Paulding, Van Wert, Crawford, Huron, Portage, Wayne, Cuyahoga, Lake, Putnam, Williams, Defiance, Lorain, Richland, Wood, Erie, Lucas, Sandusky, and Wyandot. Resident agencies in Akron, Canton, Lima, Mansfield, Painesville, Sandusky, Toledo and Youngstown.

== Oklahoma ==
- Oklahoma City: Entire state. Resident agencies in Ardmore, Durant, Elk City, Lawton, Muskogee, Norman, Stillwater, Tulsa and Woodward.

== Oregon ==
- Portland: Entire state. Resident agencies in Bend, Eugene, Medford, Pendleton and Salem.

== Pennsylvania ==
- Philadelphia: Serves the Pennsylvania counties of Adams, Berks, Bradford, Bucks, Cameron, Carbon, Centre, Chester, Clinton, Columbia, Cumberland, Delaware, Dauphin, Franklin, Fulton, Huntingdon, Juniata, Lackawanna, Lancaster, Lebanon, Lehigh, Luzerne, Lycoming, Mifflin, Monroe, Montour, Montgomery, Northampton, Northumberland, Perry, Philadelphia, Pike, Potter, Schuylkill, Snyder, Sullivan, Susquehanna, Tioga, Union, Wayne, and Wyoming, and the New Jersey counties of Camden, Gloucester, and Salem. Eight resident agencies, in Allentown, Cherry Hill, Fort Washington, Harrisburg, Newtown Square, Scranton, State College and Williamsport.
- Pittsburgh: Serves all of West Virginia and the Pennsylvania counties of Allegheny, Armstrong, Beaver, Bedford, Blair, Butler, Cambria, Clarion, Clearfield, Crawford, Elk, Erie, Fayette, Forest, Green, Indiana, Jefferson, Lawrence, McKean, Mercer, Somerset, Venango, Warren, Washington, and Westmoreland. Ten resident agencies, in Beckley, Charleroi, Charleston, Clarksburg, Cranberry Township, Erie, Huntington, Johnstown, Martinsburg and Wheeling.

== Puerto Rico ==
- San Juan: Serves all of Puerto Rico and the U.S. Virgin Islands (two US territories) with resident agencies in Aguadilla, Fajardo, and Ponce, in Puerto Rico and St. Croix and St. Thomas in the U.S. Virgin Islands.

== South Carolina ==
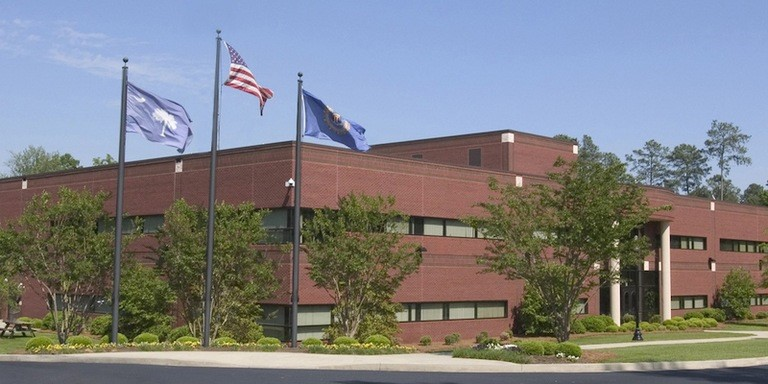
FBI Columbia Field Office

- Columbia: Entire state. Resident agencies in Aiken, Charleston, Florence, Greenville, Hilton Head, Myrtle Beach, Rock Hill and Spartanburg.

== Tennessee ==
- Nashville: Entire state. Resident agencies in Chattanooga, Clarksville, Columbia, Cookeville, Jackson, Johnson City, Knoxville, Memphis, and Tullahoma.

== Texas ==
- Dallas: Serves the counties of: Dallas, Allen, Ellis, Kaufman, Navarro, Brown, Callahan, Eastland, Fisher, Haskell, Howard, Jones, Mills, Mitchell, Nolan, Shackelford, Stephens, Stonewall, Taylor, Throckmorton, Armstrong, Briscoe, Carson, Castro, Childress, Collingsworth, Dallam, Deaf Smith, Donley, Gray, Hall, Hansford, Hartley, Hemphill, Hutchinson, Lipscomb, Moore, Ochiltree, Oldham, Parmer, Potter, Randall, Roberts, Sherman, Swisher, Wheeler, Comanche, Erath, Hood, Johnson, Palo Pinto, Parker, Tarrant, Wise, Collin, Denton, Hunt, Rockwall, Bailey, Brown, Cochran, Crosby, Dawson, Dickens, Floyd, Gaines, Garza, Hale, Hockley, Kent, lamb, Lubbock, Lynn, Motley, Scurry, Terry, Yoakum, Angelina, Houston, Nacogdoches, Polk, Sabine, San Augustine, Shelby, Trinity, Tyler, Brown, Coke, Coleman, Concho, Crockett, Glasscock, Irion, Menard, Reagan, Runnels, Schleicher, Sterling, Sutton, Tom Green, Cooke, Delta, Fannin, Grayson, Lamar, Bowie, Camp, Cass, Franklin, Hopkins, Morris, Red River, Titus, Anderson, Cherokee, Gregg, Harrison, Henderson, Marion, Panola, Rains, Rusk, Smith, Upshur, Van Zandt, Wood, Archer, Baylor, Clay, Cottle, Foard, Hardeman, Jack, King, Knox, Montague, Wichita, Wilbarger and Young. Twelve resident agencies, in Abilene, Amarillo, DFW Airport, Fort Worth, Frisco, Lubbock, Lufkin, San Angelo, Sherman, Texarkana, Tyler and Wichita Falls.
- El Paso: Serves the counties of: El Paso, Culberson, Hudspeth, Andrews, Brewster, Crane, Ector, Jeff Davis, Loving, Martin, Midland, Pecos, Presidio, Reeves, Upton, Ward and Winkler. Two resident agencies, in Alpine and Midland.
- Houston: Serves the counties of: Harris, Hardin, Jasper, Jefferson, Liberty, Newton, Orange, Austin, Brazos, Colorado, Fayette, Grimes, Madison, Waller, Montgomery, San Jacinto, Walker, Aransas, Bee, Brooks, Duval, Jim Wells, Kenedy, Kleburg, Live Oak, Nueces, San Patricio, Brazoria, Chambers, Fort Bend, Galveston, Matagorda, Wharton, Calhoun, Goliad, DeWitt, Jackson, Lavaca, Refugio and Victoria. Six resident agencies, in Beaumont, Bryan, Corpus Christi and Texas City.
- San Antonio: Serves the counties of: Atascosa, Bandera, Bexar, Comal, Frio, Gillespie, Gonzalez, Guadalupe, Karnes, Kendall, Kerr, Kimble, Mason, Medina, Real, Uvalde, Wilson, Bastrop, Blanco, Burleson, Burnett, Caldwell, Hays, Lampasas, Lee, Llano, McCullough, San Saba, Travis, Washington, Williamson, Cameron, Willacy, Dimmitt, Edwards, Kinney, Maverick, Terrell, Val Verde, Zavala, Jim Hogg, LaSalle, McMullen, Webb, Zapata, Hidalgo, Starr, Bell, Bosque, Coryell, Falls, Freestone, Hamilton, Hill, Leon, Limestone, McLennan, Milam and Robertson. Six resident agencies, in Austin, Brownsville, Del Rio, Laredo, McAllen and Waco.

== Utah ==
- Salt Lake City: Serves all counties and the state of Idaho. Resident agencies in Boise, Coeur d'Alene, Lewiston, Monticello, Ogden, Pocatello, Provo, St. George and Vernal.

== Virginia ==
- Richmond: Serves Dahlgren Naval Center, Fort Monroe, Fort Walker, and all cities and counties in Virginia not covered by the Washington, D.C. office. Resident agencies in Bristol, Charlottesville, Fredericksburg, Lynchburg, Newport News, Norfolk, Roanoke, and Winchester.

== Washington ==
- Seattle: Entire state. Resident agencies in Bellingham, Everett, Olympia, Silverdale, Spokane, Tacoma, Tri-Cities, Vancouver and Yakima.

== Washington, D.C. ==
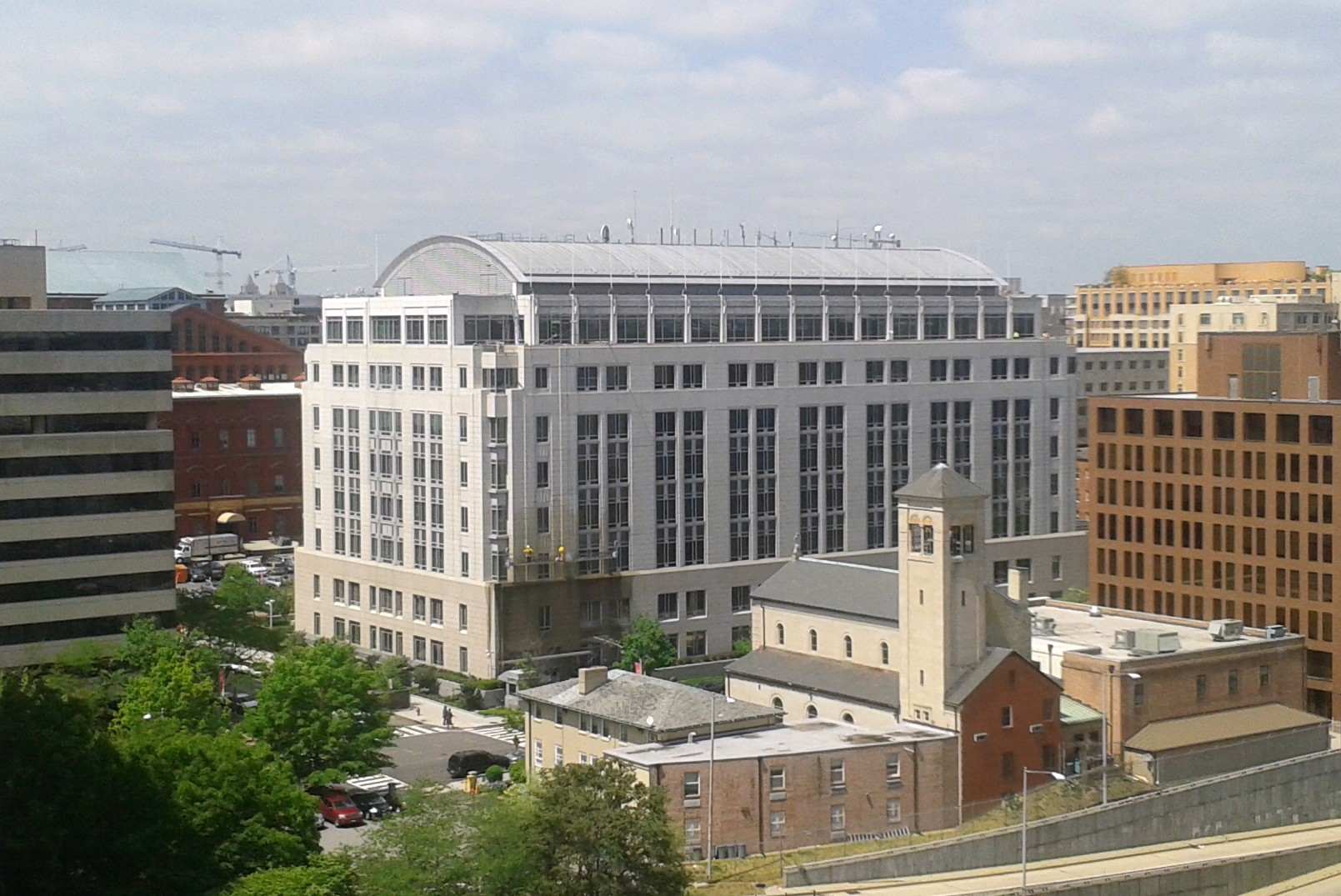
Washington, D.C. field office

- Washington, D.C.: Serves all of the District of Columbia and the Navy Annex, plus the Virginia counties of Fauquier, Arlington, Prince William, Fairfax (City and County) and Loudoun. It also serves cities and towns including Quantico, Warrenton, Falls Church, Alexandria, Manassas, Leesburg and Vienna. One resident agency, in Manassas.

== Wisconsin ==
- Milwaukee: Entire state. Resident agencies in Eau Claire, Green Bay, La Crosse, Madison and Wausau.

== See also ==
- List of ATF field divisions
- List of ICE field offices
- List of United States Secret Service field offices
