= List of ATF field divisions =

The Bureau of Alcohol, Tobacco, Firearms and Explosives (ATF) operates a number of field divisions within the United States. The following list gives the locations of these offices. This article merely lists states and cities that have field divisions with links that go not to field divisions in states, but to general information on the states and cities. Some offices are located in a different city or town than the one in the office's name. This will be noted in the list.

== List of field divisions ==
- Alabama (4 offices)
  - Birmingham
  - Huntsville (located at Redstone Arsenal)
  - Mobile
  - Montgomery
- Alaska (1 office)
  - Anchorage
- Arizona (4 offices)
  - Flagstaff
  - Phoenix
  - Sierra Vista
  - Tucson
- Arkansas (2 offices)
  - Fort Smith
  - Little Rock
- California (20 offices)
  - Benicia
  - Dublin (same location as the San Francisco field division)
  - El Centro (located in Imperial)
  - Fresno
  - Glendale
  - Long Beach
  - Los Angeles (two offices; one in Glendale)
  - Oakland
  - Riverside
  - Sacramento
  - San Bernardino
  - San Diego (two offices; one in Carlsbad)
  - San Francisco (two offices; one in Dublin)
  - San Jose
  - Santa Ana
  - Santa Maria
  - Stockton
- Colorado (2 offices)
  - Colorado Springs
  - Denver
- Connecticut (2 offices)
  - Hartford
  - New Haven
- Delaware (1 office)
  - Wilmington
- District of Columbia (1 office)
  - Washington, D.C. (Ariel Rios Federal Building)
- Florida (14 offices)
  - Fort Lauderdale
  - Fort Myers
  - Ft. Pierce (located in Port St. Lucie)
  - Gainesville
  - Jacksonville
  - Miami
  - Orlando (two offices)
  - Panama City
  - Pensacola
  - Tallahassee
  - Tampa (two offices)
  - West Palm Beach
- Georgia (5 offices)
  - Atlanta
  - Augusta
  - Columbus
  - Macon
  - Savannah
- Guam (1 office)
  - Mong Mong
- Hawaii (2 offices)
  - Hawaii County (located in Hilo)
  - Honolulu
- Idaho (1 office)
  - Boise
- Illinois (5 offices)
  - Chicago
  - Downers Grove
  - Fairview Heights
  - Rockford
  - Springfield
- Indiana (4 offices)
  - Evansville
  - Fort Wayne
  - Indianapolis
  - Merrillville (located in Crown Point)
- Iowa (4 offices)
  - Cedar Rapids
  - Davenport
  - Des Moines
  - Sioux City
- Kansas (1 office)
  - Wichita
- Kentucky (6 offices)
  - Ashland
  - Bowling Green
  - Lexington
  - London
  - Louisville
  - Paducah
- Louisiana (4 offices)
  - Baton Rouge
  - Lafayette
  - New Orleans (located in Metairie)
  - Shreveport
- Maine (2 offices)
  - Bangor
  - Portland
- Maryland (3 offices)
  - Baltimore
  - Hyattsville (two offices; one in Greenbelt, one in Lanham)
- Massachusetts (4 offices)
  - Boston
  - Bridgewater
  - Springfield
  - Worcester
- Michigan (6 offices)
  - Ann Arbor
  - Detroit
  - Flint
  - Grand Rapids
  - Lansing
  - Marquette
- Minnesota (2 offices)
  - Duluth
  - Saint Paul
- Mississippi (3 offices)
  - Gulfport
  - Jackson
  - Oxford
- Missouri (6 offices)
  - Cape Girardeau
  - Jefferson City
  - Kansas City (two offices)
  - Springfield
  - St. Louis
- Montana (3 offices)
  - Billings
  - Helena
  - Missoula
- Nebraska (1 office)
  - Omaha
- Nevada (2 offices)
  - Las Vegas
  - Reno
- New Hampshire (1 office)
  - Manchester (located in Bedford)
- New Jersey (5 offices)
  - Atlantic City (located in Egg Harbor Township)
  - Camden (located in Cherry Hill)
  - Newark (two offices; both in Woodland Park)
  - Trenton
- New Mexico (3 offices)
  - Albuquerque
  - Las Cruces
  - Roswell
- New York (8 offices)
  - Albany
  - Buffalo
  - Hudson Valley (located in the Bronx)
  - Long Island (located in Melville)
  - New York City (two offices)
  - Rochester
  - Syracuse
- North Carolina (6 offices)
  - Asheville
  - Asheville
  - Fayetteville
  - Greensboro
  - Raleigh
  - Wilmington
- North Dakota (2 offices)
  - Bismarck
  - Fargo
- Ohio (6 offices)
  - Cincinnati
  - Cleveland (located in Independence)
  - Columbus (two offices)
  - Toledo
  - Youngstown (located in Poland)
- Oklahoma (2 offices)
  - Oklahoma City
  - Tulsa
- Oregon (2 offices)
  - Eugene
  - Portland
- Pennsylvania (8 offices)
  - Erie
  - Harrisburg
  - Lansdale
  - Philadelphia (two offices)
  - Pittsburgh
  - Reading (located in Allentown)
  - Wilkes-Barre
- Puerto Rico (2 offices)
  - Mayagüez
  - San Juan
- Rhode Island (1 office)
  - Providence
- South Carolina (4 offices)
  - Charleston
  - Columbia
  - Florence
  - Greenville
- South Dakota (2 offices)
  - Rapid City
  - Sioux Falls
- Tennessee (7 offices)
  - Chattanooga
  - Greeneville
  - Jackson
  - Knoxville
  - Memphis
  - Nashville (two offices; both in Franklin)
- Texas (17 offices)
  - Amarillo
  - Austin
  - Beaumont
  - Brownsville (located in Harlingen)
  - Corpus Christi
  - Dallas
  - El Paso
  - Fort Worth
  - Houston
  - Laredo
  - Lubbock
  - McAllen
  - Plano
  - San Antonio
  - Sherman
  - Tyler
  - Waco
- U.S. Virgin Islands (2 offices)
  - Saint Croix (located in Christiansted)
  - Saint Thomas
- Utah (1 office)
  - Salt Lake City
- Vermont (1 office)
  - Burlington
- Virginia (8 offices)
  - Bristol
  - Falls Church
  - Newport News (located in Hampton)
  - Norfolk
  - Richmond (two offices)
  - Roanoke
  - Winchester
- Washington (3 offices)
  - Seattle
  - Spokane
  - Yakima (located in Union)
- West Virginia (4 offices)
  - Charleston
  - Clarksburg (located in Bridgeport)
  - Martinsburg
  - Wheeling
- Wisconsin (2 offices)
  - Madison
  - Milwaukee
- Wyoming (2 offices)
  - Cheyenne
  - Lander

== See also ==
- List of FBI field offices
- List of United States Secret Service field offices
