= Consulate General of the United States, Toronto =

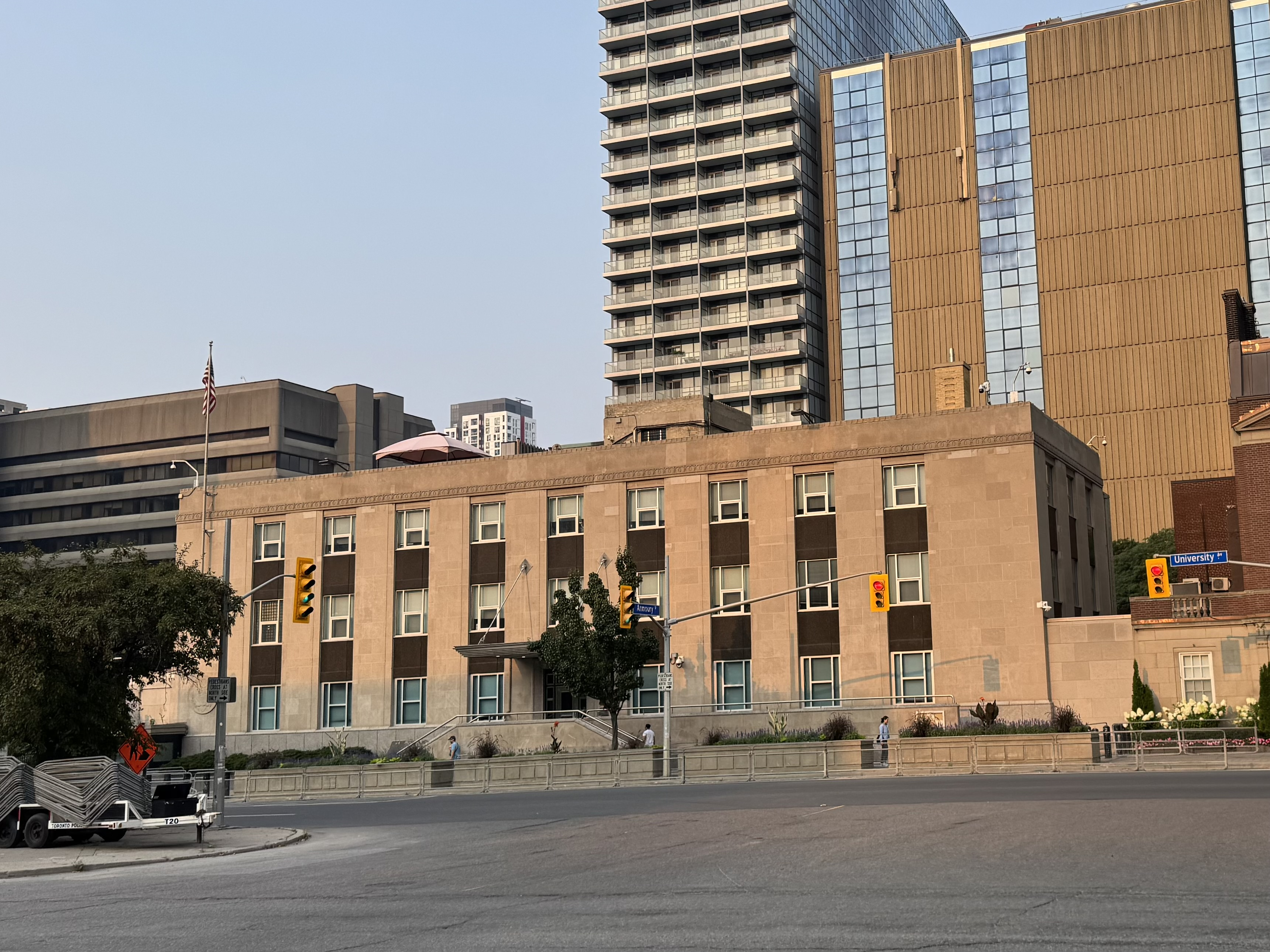
- The Consulate-General in 2025
- Location: 360 University Avenue; Toronto, Ontario, Canada
- Coordinates: 43°39′10″N 79°23′16″W
- Opened: 1864 (as Consulate); 1935 (as Consulate General)
- Consul General: Baxter Hunt
- Website: ca.usembassy.gov/u-s-consulate-toronto/

The Consulate General of the United States in Toronto is a diplomatic mission of the United States in Toronto, Canada. The Consulate General reports to the American Embassy to Canada in Ottawa, the primary American diplomatic mission to Canada. The building was completed in 1953 and is located on University Avenue in Downtown Toronto.

Baxter Hunt is the current US Consul General in Toronto.

On March 10, 2026, the building was shot at, with the suspects fleeing in a car. No one was injured. Chris Leather of the RCMP said that the shooting was "definitely a national security incident" and the RCMP was working with the FBI and CSIS to investigate it.
