= List of United States Secret Service field offices =

US Secret Service Logo

The United States Secret Service, an agency of the United States Department of Homeland Security, operates a number of field offices in both the United States and in other countries. The following list gives the locations of these offices. For the United States, this article merely lists states and cities that have field offices with links that go not to field offices in states, but to general information on the states and cities.

== Field and Resident Offices within the United States, Guam and Puerto Rico ==
- Alabama (3 Offices)
  - Birmingham, Mobile, Montgomery
- Arizona (2 Offices)
  - Phoenix, Tucson
- Arkansas (1 Office)
  - Little Rock
- California (9 Offices)
  - Camarillo, Fresno, Los Angeles, Riverside, Sacramento, San Diego, San Francisco, San Jose, Santa Ana
- Colorado (1 Office)
  - Greenwood Village
- Connecticut (1 Office)
  - New Haven
- Delaware (1 Office)
  - Wilmington
- District of Columbia (1 Office) - In addition to the field office in D.C., the Secret Service is headquartered in the city, which is the capital of the United States.
- Florida (7 Offices)
  - Fort Myers, Jacksonville, Miami, Orlando, Tallahassee, Tampa, West Palm Beach
- Georgia (3 Offices)
  - Albany, Atlanta, Savannah
- Guam (1 Office)
- Hawaii (1 Office)
  - Honolulu
- Illinois (2 Offices)
  - Chicago, Springfield
- Indiana (1 Office)
  - Indianapolis
- Kentucky (2 Offices)
  - Lexington, Louisville
- Louisiana (2 Offices)
  - Baton Rouge, Metairie
- Maine (1 Office)
  - Portland
- Maryland (2 Offices)
  - Baltimore, Laurel
- Massachusetts (1 Office)
  - Boston
- Michigan (3 Offices)
  - Detroit, Grand Rapids, Saginaw
- Minnesota (1 Office)
  - Minneapolis
- Mississippi (1 Office)
  - Jackson
- Missouri (2 Offices)
  - Kansas City, St. Louis
- Nebraska (1 Office)
  - Omaha
- Nevada (2 Offices)
  - Las Vegas, Reno
- New Hampshire (1 Office)
  - Manchester
- New Jersey (4 Offices)
  - Egg Harbor Township, Morristown, Newark, Trenton
- New Mexico (1 Office)
  - Albuquerque
- New York (7 Offices)
  - Albany, Brooklyn, Buffalo, Melville, Springfield Gardens, Syracuse, White Plains, Rochester
- North Carolina (4 Offices)
  - Charlotte, Greensboro, Raleigh, Wilmington
- Ohio (5 Offices)
  - Cincinnati, Columbus, Dayton, Independence, Toledo
- Oklahoma (2 Offices)
  - Oklahoma City, Tulsa
- Oregon (1 Office)
  - Portland
- Pennsylvania (3 Offices)
  - Philadelphia, Pittsburgh, Scranton
- Puerto Rico (1 Office)
  - Guaynabo
- Rhode Island (1 Office)
  - Providence
- South Carolina (3 Offices)
  - Columbia, Greenville, Mount Pleasant
- South Dakota (1 Office)
  - Sioux Falls
- Tennessee (4 Offices)
  - Chattanooga, Knoxville, Memphis, Nashville
- Texas (8 Offices)
  - Austin, El Paso, Houston, Irving, Lubbock, McAllen, San Antonio, Waco
- Utah (1 Office)
  - Salt Lake City
- Virginia (3 Offices)
  - Norfolk, Richmond
- Washington (2 Offices)
  - Seattle, Spokane
- West Virginia (1 Office)
  - Charleston
- Wisconsin (1 Office)
  - Milwaukee

== Offices in foreign countries ==
The Secret Service maintains field offices at the following foreign countries:

- Brazil (1 office, in Brasília)
- Bulgaria (1 office, in Sofia)
- Canada (2 offices, in Ottawa and Vancouver)
- China (1 office, in Hong Kong)
- Colombia (1 office, in Bogotá)
- Estonia (1 office, in Tallinn)
- France (1 office, in Paris)
- Germany (1 office, in Frankfurt)
- Italy (1 office, in Rome)
- Mexico (1 office, in Mexico City)
- Netherlands (1 office, at Europol headquarters in The Hague)
- Peru (1 office, in Lima)
- Romania (1 office, in Bucharest)
- South Africa (1 office, in Pretoria)
- Spain (1 office, in Madrid)
- Thailand (1 office, in Bangkok)
- United Kingdom (1 office, in London)

== See also ==
- List of ATF field divisions
- List of FBI field offices
