= Laura Budd =

American politician from North Carolina

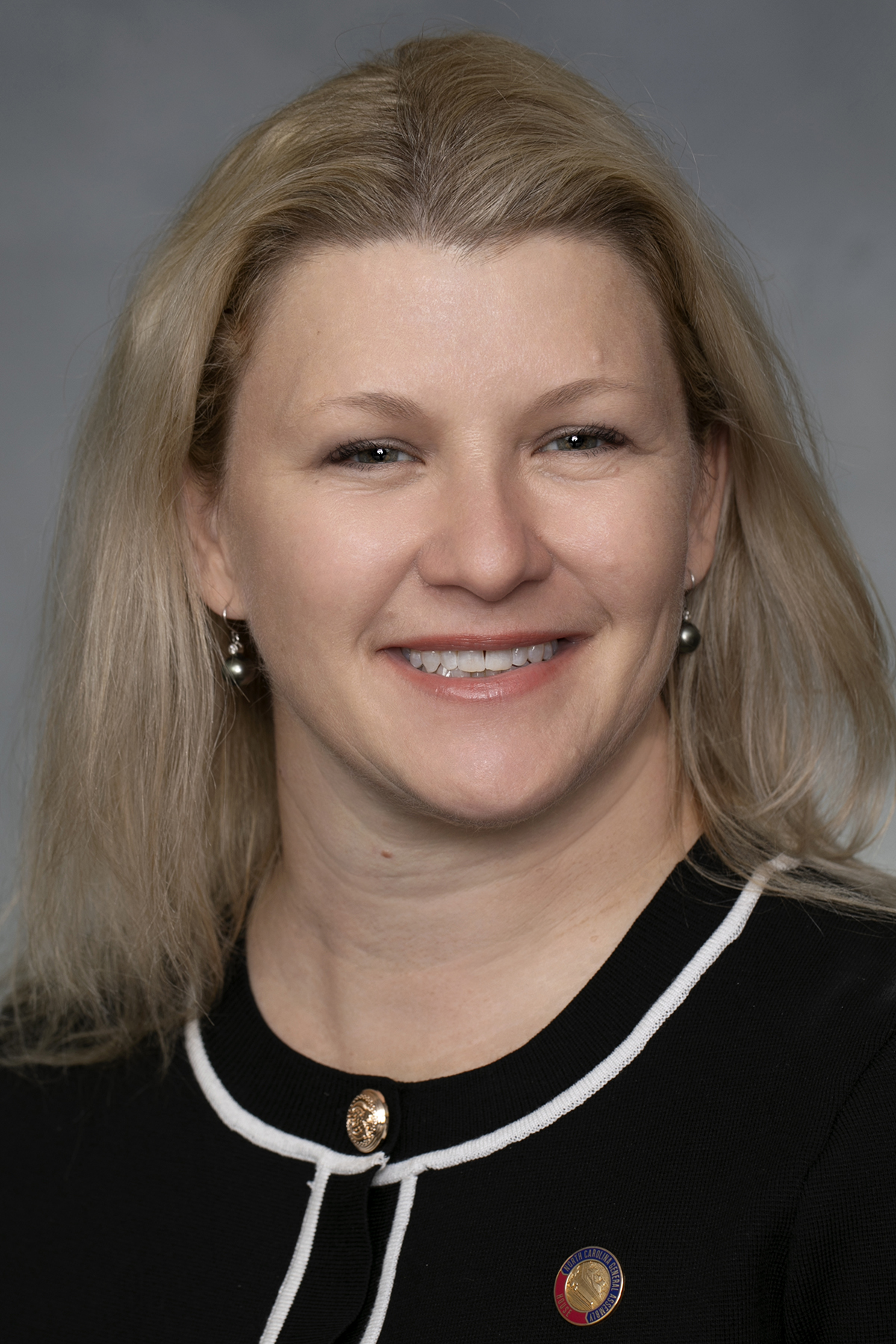

Member of the North Carolina House of Representatives from the 103rd district
- Incumbent
- Assumed office January 1, 2023
- Preceded by: Rachel Hunt

Personal details
- Born: Laura Budd; 1977 (age 48–49) Atlanta, Georgia, U.S.
- Party: Democratic
- Spouse: Chuck
- Children: 3
- Education: Ohio University (BA); Wake Forest University School of Law (JD)
- Occupation: Attorney

Laura Budd is a Democratic member of the North Carolina House of Representatives. She represents the 103rd district, which includes parts of Mecklenburg County. Outside of politics, she works as an attorney. She's a member of the Progressive House Caucus.

== Biography ==
Budd went to Ohio University where she received a Bachelor of Arts in history and political science cum laude in 1999. She then went to Wake Forest School of Law where received a Juris Doctor in 2002.

Budd serves as the president of the Matthews Athletic Recreation Association, and as the vice-president of Piedmont Gymnastics Association. Budd is also a member of the Mecklenburg County Bar, and the Matthews Chamber of Commerce and Women in the Profession for the North Carolina Bar Association. She has previously served on the board of directors for the Peace & Justice Immigration Clinic and Matthews Free Medical Clinic and is a volunteer with Room in the Inn.

North Carolina House of Representatives
| Preceded by Rachel Hunt | Member of the North Carolina House of Representatives from the 103rd district 2023–Present | Incumbent |
