= Porter Military Academy =

Porter Military Academy may refer to:

- Charleston Arsenal, on the peninsula in Charleston, South Carolina, listed on the National Register of Historic Places as Porter Military Academy
- Porter-Gaud School, located west of the Ashley River in Charleston, South Carolina, the current successor by merger to Porter Military Academy
