= Tobacco and Slaves =

Book by Allan Kulikoff

- Author: Allan Kulikoff
- Language: English
- Subject: Province of Maryland; Colony of Virginia; Slavery in the United States
- Publisher: University of North Carolina Press for the Institute of Early American History and Culture
- Publication date: 1986
- Publication place: United States
- Media type: Print (hardback and paperback)
- Pages: 449 pp.
- ISBN: 0-8078-1671-X (hardback); ISBN 0-8078-4224-9 (paperback)
- OCLC: 12081526
- Dewey Decimal: 306/.09755/18 19
- LC Class: HC107.A12 K85 1986

Tobacco and Slaves: The Development of Southern Cultures in the Chesapeake, 1680–1800, is a book written by historian Allan Kulikoff. Published in 1986, it is the first major study that synthesized the historiography of the colonial Chesapeake region of the United States. Tobacco and Slaves is a neo-Marxist study that explains the creation of a racial caste system in the tobacco-growing regions of Maryland and Virginia and the origins of southern slave society. Kulikoff uses statistics compiled from colonial court and church records, tobacco sales, and land surveys to conclude that economic, political, and social developments in the 18th-century Chesapeake established the foundations of economics, politics, and society in the 19th-century South.

== Historiographic background ==
During the early 20th century, the historiography of the Chesapeake colonies was dominated by the Cavalier myth. Studies focused exclusively on the white planter elite who were portrayed as both the descendants of English Cavaliers and the progenitors of the Virginia dynasty that controlled the first fifty years of post-Revolutionary American politics. Much attention was given to the families of prominent Virginian statesmen George Washington, Thomas Jefferson, and James Madison. Challenges to the Cavalier myth and its influence on the historiography appeared in Thomas Jefferson Wertenbaker's Torchbearer of the Revolution: The Story of Bacon's Rebellion and Its Leaders (1940), Wesley Frank Craven's The Southern Colonies in the Seventheenth Century, 1607–1689 (1949), and Carl Bridenbaugh's Myths and Realities: Societies of the Colonial South (1952).

Despite revision of the traditional historiography, African American slaves and women remained in the periphery of studies of the Chesapeake until the 1960s. Winthrop D. Jordan's White Over Black: American Attitudes Toward the Negro, 1550–1812 (1968) offered the first interpretation of the roles of women and slaves in the Chesapeake colonies. Since the 1960s, scholars have produced broad examinations of colonial Chesapeake society. Gerald W. Mullin's Flight and Rebellion: Slave Resistance in Eighteenth-Century Virginia (1972), Edmund S. Morgan's American Slavery, American Freedom: The Ordeal of Colonial Virginia (1975), Lois G. Carr and Lorena S. Walsh's article "The Planter's Wife: The Experience of White Women in Seventeenth-Century Maryland" (1977) printed in the William and Mary Quarterly, Rhys Isaac's The Transformation of Virginia, 1740–1790 (1982), and Jan Lewis's The Pursuit of Happiness: Family and Values in Jefferson's Virginia (1983) and Kathleen D. Brown's Good Wives, Nasty Wenches, and Anxious Patriarchs: Gender, Race, and Power in Colonial Virginia (1996) offer analyses of women, slaves, and poorer whites in the Chesapeake.

Along with social and cultural histories, historians of the Chesapeake continued to study the relationships between politics and the economy that drew the Chesapeake colonies into the Revolution. Ronald Hoffman's A Spirit of Dissension: Economics, Politics, and the Revolution in Maryland (1973), Paul G. E. Clemens's The Atlantic Economy and Colonial Maryland's Eastern Shore: From Tobacco to Grain (1980), Gloria L. Main's Tobacco Colony: Life in Early Maryland, 1650–1720 (1982), and Isaac's Transformation of Virginia forward diverse interpretations of the connections between politics, economy, and revolution and the changes they elicited. Out of this historiographic milieu, Allan Kulikoff produced Tobacco and Slaves in an attempt to synthesize the disparate interpretations and analyses with his own research of the Chesapeake.

== Kulikoff's argument ==
In Tobacco and Slaves, Kulikoff states that there have been two tendencies among modern historians of the Chesapeake. Scholars either stress the importance of economic and demographic patterns of development in the 17th century or the political and cultural transformations in the 18th century. "Both groups," asserts Kulikoff, "tend to slight the significance of the half-century before the Revolution." "In contrast," insists Kulikoff, "the kind of familial, class, and race relations found in the antebellum South first developed in the Chesapeake region between 1720 and 1770." In this period, Kulikoff argues that three structural changes led to the creation of a racial caste system: a decline in opportunity for social mobility for whites, the beginnings of natural increase among whites, and the rise of chattel slavery. These changes encouraged the formation of classes through efforts by the gentry to "mak[e] slaves efficient workers and devis[e] a ruling class ideology."

Kulikoff analyzes the consequences of these structural shifts for white and black residents of the Chesapeake. White inhabitants experienced the creation of patriarchial families, the evolution of kinship networks, and the formation of the gentry and yeoman classes. Slaves, on the other hand, witnessed the development of black communities, the creation of extended families and eventually kinship networks, and finally the development of a new racial etiquette that governed the relationship between master and slave.
