= George M. Fredrickson =

American author, activist, historian and professor

- Born: July 16, 1934; Bristol, Connecticut, U.S.
- Died: February 25, 2008 (aged 73); Palo Alto, California, U.S.
- Organization: Stanford University
- Known for: White Supremacy: a Comparative Study in American and South African History

Education
- Education: Harvard University
- Thesis: The inner Civil War; Northern intellectuals and the war for the Union (1964)
- Doctoral advisor: Donald Fleming

George M. Fredrickson (July 16, 1934 – February 25, 2008) was an American author, activist, historian, and professor. He was the Edgar E. Robinson Professor of United States History at Stanford University until his retirement in 2002. After his retirement he continued to publish several texts, authoring a total of eight books and editing four more in addition to writing various articles. One of his best known works remains White Supremacy: A Comparative Study of American and South African History, which received the Ralph Waldo Emerson Prize and the Merle Curti Award as well as made him a finalist of the Pulitzer Prize for History and the National Book Award.

Fredrickson's most fundamental pieces of work were centered on the history of race and racism in the United States and globally. It has been said that his analysis of the differing views expressed by northern and southern whites in the U.S. (before the Civil War) on black inferiority in his book The Black Image in the White Mind (1971) contributed greatly to the understanding of racism during that time. He continued to examine racial ideology during the American Civil War until his death in February 2008.

== Early life and education ==
Fredrickson was born on July 16, 1934, in Bristol, Connecticut, and spent most of his early life in Sioux Falls, South Dakota. He attended high school in South Dakota and was accepted into Harvard University where he graduated magna cum laude in 1956. He later attended the University of Oslo on a Fulbright Scholarship before joining the Navy, he was discharged in 1960 after serving for three years. Returning to Harvard University, he earned his doctorate in 1964 under historian Donald Fleming. He published his first book The Inner Civil War a year later; it examined the influence of the Civil War on intellectual figures in the U.S. during that time.

== Academic career and activism ==
After receiving his doctorate at Harvard University, Fredrickson taught at the university for three years before moving to Northwestern University where he became the William Smith Mason Professor of American History. In 1984, he moved on to teach at Stanford University as the Edgar E. Robinson professor of United States history until his retirement in 2002. During his time there he received the Allan V. Cox Medal for Faculty Excellence Fostering Undergraduate Research. He served as a mentor for both undergraduate and graduate students at Northwestern University and Stanford University. Fredrickson was one of the drivers of comparative history, co-founding the Research Institute of Comparative Studies in Race and Ethnicity in 1996.

In his college years, he was one of the many white college students who traveled to the South in support of the civil rights movement for African Americans and joined the March on Washington in 1963. Fredrickson was avid in his protest against the apartheid in South Africa, even "urging Stanford to divest its stock in companies doing business with South Africa" and with the late Stanford sociologist St. Clair Drake, "delivered a petition signed by 206 faculty members to the Stanford Board of Trustees."

In the foreword of Racism: A Short History republished in 2015, Stanford historian Albert M. Camarillo discusses the courses that he co-wrote and taught with Fredrickson. They developed a survey course called "Race and Ethnicity in the American Experience" that "examined how ideologies of race were manifested in societal institutions and policies that shaped the socioeconomic statues of communities of color in North America from the colonial era (British and Spanish) through the twentieth century." Another course that they taught was "Comparative Perspectives on Race and Ethnicity" which were inspired by a seminar they participated from 1992 to 1994. He co-founded the Research Institute of Comparative Studies in Race and Ethnicity at Stanford in 1996.

Fredrickson was the president of the Organization of American Historians in 1997-98 and was appointed twice as a senior fellow for the National Endowment for the Humanities. He received fellowships from the Humanities Center and the John Simon Guggenheim Memorial Foundation. Fredrickson was best known for his work in the fields of comparative history, along with his work in the study of the history of racism and white supremacy.

== Works ==
In his lifetime, Fredrickson published many works covering themes of racism, equality, and shifting ideology.

He published eight books:

- The Inner Civil War: Northern Intellectuals and the Crisis of the Union (1965)
- The Black Image in the White Mind (1971)
- White Supremacy: A Comparative Study of American and South African History (1981)
- Arrogance of Race: Historical Perspectives on Slavery, Racism, and Social Inequality (1988)
- Black Liberation: A Comparative History of Black Ideologies in the United States and South Africa (1995)
- The Comparative Imagination: On Racism, Nationalism, and Social Movements (1997)
- Racism: A Short History (2002)
- Big Enough to Be Inconsistent: Abraham Lincoln Confronts Slavery and Race (2008)

Fredrickson's Racism: A Short History captured his conception "of racial inequality and racism, as ideology and practice in Western societies over the past half millennium," and how it is "based on the three primary components: ideas of racial purity, cultural essentialism or particularism, and a 'them' vs. 'us' mindset in which difference and power (and powerlessness) structured racist regimes."

His essays and articles included expanding on themes of comparative ideology on racism in the United States and South Africa.

== Awards ==
- Pulitzer Prize for History finalist 1982
- Merle Curti Award from the Organization of American Historians 1982
- Ralph Waldo Emerson Award from the Phi Beta Kappa Society
- Anisfield-Wolf Book Award
- Cox Award for Encouraging Undergraduate Research 2002 from Stanford

== Personal life and death ==
He was married to Hélène Osouf for 52 years, with whom he had four children. Fredrickson died on February 25, 2008, of heart failure at the age of 73.

== Bibliography ==
- The Inner Civil War: Northern Intellectuals and the Crisis of the Union, New York: Harper, 1965.
- Black Image in the White Mind: The Debate on Afro-American Character and Destiny, 1817-1914, New York: Harper, 1971.
- White Supremacy: A Comparative Study in American and South African History. Oxford University Press. 1982. ISBN 978-0-19-503042-6. "George M. Fredrickson."
- Racism: A Short History. Princeton University Press. 2002. ISBN 978-0-691-00899-8. "George M. Fredrickson."
- Fredrickson, George M. (November 8, 2003). "Race, Ethnicity, and National Identity in France and the United States: A Comparative Historical Overview" (PDF). Yale. Archived from the original (PDF) on December 8, 2003.
- The comparative imagination: on the history of racism, nationalism, and social movements. University of California Press. 2000. ISBN 978-0-520-22484-1.
- The arrogance of race: historical perspectives on slavery, racism, and social inequality. Wesleyan University Press. 1988. ISBN 978-0-8195-6217-3. "George M. Fredrickson."
- Maurice Smethurst Evans (2001). Black and white in the southern states: a study of the race problem in the United States from a South African point of view. Introduction George M. Fredrickson. University of South Carolina Press. ISBN 978-1-57003-409-1.
- Nancy Foner; George M. Fredrickson, eds. (2005). Not Just Black and White: Historical and Contemporary Perspectives on Immigration, Race, and Ethnicity in the United States. Russell Sage Foundation. ISBN 978-0-87154-270-0. "George M. Fredrickson."
- "Antislavery Racist: Hinton Rowan Helper," in Fredrickson, The Arrogance of Race: Historical Perspectives on Slavery, Racism, and Social Inequality (1988).
- Helper, Hinton Rowan. The Impending Crisis of the South: How to Meet It (1968) [1857]. Fredrickson was the editor and the author of a 55-page introduction. Cambridge, Massachusetts: The Belknap Press of Harvard University Press.
- Big Enough to Be Inconsistent: Abraham Lincoln Confronts Slavery and Race. Cambridge, Massachusetts, and London, England: Harvard University Press, 2008.

=== Journal articles ===
- Fredrickson, George M. (December 1998). "Presidential Address: America's Diversity in Comparative Perspective". The Journal of American History. 85 (3): 859–875. doi:10.2307/2567214. JSTOR 2567214.
- Fredrickson, George M. (December 1998). "From Exceptionalism to Variability: Recent Developments in Cross-National Comparative History". The Journal of American History. 82 (2): 587–604. doi:10.2307/2082188. JSTOR 2567214.
