= Donald Harnish Fleming =

American historian

Donald Harnish Fleming (August 7, 1923, Hagerstown, Maryland – June 16, 2008, Cambridge, Massachusetts) was Jonathan Trumbull Professor of American History at Harvard University. He specialized in American and European intellectual history and the history of science and medicine.

== Biography ==
Fleming graduated from Johns Hopkins University with AB in 1943 and from Harvard University with AM in 1944 and PhD in 1947. From 1947 to 1959 he was a faculty member of Brown University's history department. After spending the academic year 1958–1959 as a professor at Yale University, he joined in 1959 the faculty of Harvard University's history department. He remained a professor there until 1999, when he retired as professor emeritus. He was from 1963 to 1965 the chair of the department and from 1973 to 1980 the director of the Charles Warren Center for Studies in American History. He was from 1967 to 1986 the co-editor, with Bernard Bailyn, of the journal Perspectives in American History, an annual volume of monographic essays.

Fleming was a lifelong bachelor. His cremated remains were buried at Harvard Hill in Mt. Auburn Cemetery, Cambridge.

== Awards and honors ==
- 1948 — Beveridge Award of the American Historical Association
- 1962 — elected a member of the American Academy of Arts and Sciences
- 1965 — Guggenheim Fellow for the academic year 1965–1966

== Selected publications ==
=== Articles ===
- Fleming, Donald (1952). "Latent Heat and the Invention of the Watt Engine". Isis. 43: 3–5. doi:10.1086/349358. S2CID 144758218.
- —— (1955). "Galen on the Motions of the Blood in the Heart and Lungs". Isis. 46 (143): 14–21. doi:10.1086/348379. PMID 14353581. S2CID 29583656.
- —— (1959). "The Centenary of the Origin of Species". Journal of the History of Ideas. 20 (3): 437–446. doi:10.2307/2708122. JSTOR 2708122.
- —— (1961). "Charles Darwin, the Anaesthetic Man". Victorian Studies. 4 (3): 219–236. JSTOR 3825547.
- —— (1962). "The Ends in View of the Preservation of the Private Papers of American Scientists". Isis. 53: 118–121. doi:10.1086/349540. PMID 13893520. S2CID 42471676.
- —— (1979). "Comment on Fox and His Commentators". The Milbank Memorial Fund Quarterly. Health and Society. 57 (3): 380–384. doi:10.2307/3349793. JSTOR 3349793. PMID 257201.
- —— (1984). "Walter B. Cannon and Homeostasis". Social Research. 51 (3): 609–640. JSTOR 40970955. PMID 11616403.
- —— (1990). "John Leonard Clive". Proceedings of the Massachusetts Historical Society. 102: 164–166. JSTOR 25081022.
- —— (1993). "Frank Freidel". Proceedings of the Massachusetts Historical Society. 105: 169–171. JSTOR 25081073.

=== Books ===
- Fleming, Donald (1950). John William Draper and the Religion of Science. Philadelphia: University of Pennsylvania Press. doi:10.9783/9781512801705. ISBN 978-1-5128-0169-9. JSTOR j.ctv5134fn.
- —— (1954). William H. Welch and the Rise of Modern Medicine. The Library of American Biography. Little, Brown and Co.
- Bailyn, Bernard; Fleming, Donald; Handlin, Oscar; Thernstrom, Stephan (1986). Glimpses of the Harvard past. Harvard University Press. ISBN 9780674354432.
