= The Impending Crisis of the South =

1857 book by Hinton Rowan Helper

The Impending Crisis of the South: How to Meet It
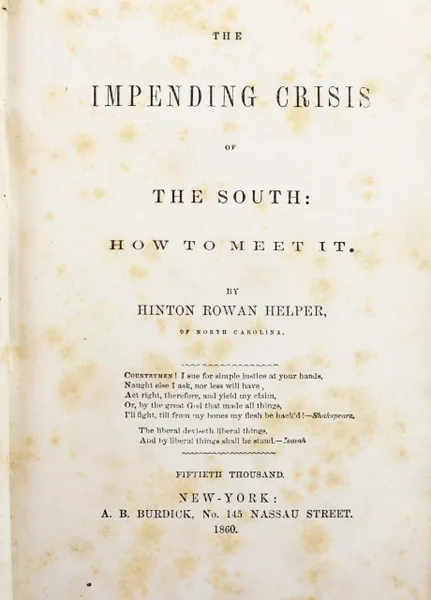
- Title page for The Impending Crisis of the South: How to Meet It (1860 edition)
- Author: Hinton Rowan Helper
- Publisher: Burdick Brothers
- Publication date: 1857
- OCLC: 226488928
- Website: https://www.gutenberg.org/ebooks/36055

The Impending Crisis of the South: How to Meet It is an 1857 book by the American abolitionist and white supremacist Hinton Rowan Helper, who declared himself a proud Southerner. It was written mostly in Baltimore, but, as he pointed out, it would have been illegal to publish it there. It was a strong attack on slavery as inefficient and a barrier to the economic advancement of the South in general and of the non-slaveholding whites of the South in particular. The book was widely distributed by Horace Greeley, Francis P. Blair, and other antislavery leaders, which infuriated Southerners.

According to historian George M. Fredrickson, "it would not be difficult to make a case for The Impending Crisis as the most important single book, in terms of its political impact, that has ever been published in the United States. Even more perhaps than Uncle Tom's Cabin, it fed the fires of sectional controversy leading up to the Civil War; for it had the distinction of being the only book in American history to become the center of bitter and prolonged Congressional debate." (Note: Fredrickson edited, and wrote a 55-page introduction to, a 1968 edition of The Impending Crisis of the South, published by The Belknap Press of Harvard University Press. The quoted language is on page ix of his introduction.)

In the Northern United States, it became "the book against slavery." A book reviewer wrote, "Next to Uncle Tom's Cabin (1852), Hinton Helper's critique of slavery and the Southern class system, The Impending Crisis of the South (1857), was arguably the most important antislavery book of the 1850s."

== Condemnation of slavery ==
The book condemned slavery, but "not with reference, except in a very slight degree, to its humanitarian or religious aspects," which had already been dealt with at length by Northern writers. Instead, Helper criticized slavery on economic grounds, appealing to whites' rational self-interest, rather than "any special friendliness or sympathy for the blacks." Helper claimed that slavery hurt the Southern economy by preventing economic development and industrialization and that it was the main reason why the South had fallen far behind the North, both economically and demographically. Helper tried to speak on behalf of the majority of Southern whites, poor or of moderate means — the plain folk of the Old South — who he claimed were oppressed by a small aristocracy of wealthy slave owners.

Helper's tone was aggressive: "Freesoilers and abolitionists are the only true friends of the South; slaveholders and slave-breeders are downright enemies of their own section. Anti-slavery men are working for the Union and the good of the whole world; proslavery men are working for the disunion of the States, and the good of nothing except themselves."

=== The poverty of the slaveholding South ===
According to a published summary of the book, the South, despite slavery, was not doing well economically. Massachusetts produced sixteen bushels of wheat per acre, while Virginia produced only seven. Iowa produced thirty-six bushels of oats to the acre; Mississippi produced only twelve. In 1790, at the time of the first census, the population of New York was 340,000 and that of Virginia 748,000; in 1850 the population of New York was 3,097,000, while that of Virginia was 1,421,000. Land in the North sells for much more than land in the South. These are only a few examples of the many statistics of this sort in the book. Many draw on the U.S. Census or other "confessedly authentic, and for the most part official, sources of information."

== Political impact ==
A version of it was published in German translation in 1860.

With the approach of the 1860 presidential election, to help the Republican Party a Compendium or Compend version appeared in July 1859; it was an abridgement that kept the statistics but watered down some of the confrontational rhetoric. Sixty-eight Republican members of Congress endorsed it. By December 1859, 500 copies a day were being sold.

This version met with fierce opposition. Possession of a copy was treated as a criminal offense in most of the South. Distributors of the book were arrested, and three men in Arkansas were hanged for possession of it.

Congress convened on December 5, 1859, but the House of Representatives was unable to conduct any business until February 1, 1860, because it was unable to elect a Speaker of the House after a Congressman, John Bullock Clark of Missouri, floated a resolution that no one who had endorsed the Compendium could be chosen. This would knock one of the previously favored candidates, John Sherman of Ohio, out of contention, along with 67 other Republican Congressman. Balloting ceased as uncontrolled debate about Helper's book and Clark's resolution consumed the House. During the "ill-tempered and acrimonious election for Speaker of the House, the second longest in congressional history ... southern politicians refused to accept as Speaker anyone who had supported Helper". (Another source says it was the longest dispute, with 44 elections for speaker.) Eventually a compromise non-entity was selected by a margin of 1 vote.

In 1860, Louis F. Schade published an 80-page rebuttal to Helper's book, A Book for the "Impending Crisis!" Appeal to the Common Sense and Patriotism of the People of the United States. "Helperism" Annihilated! The "Irrepressible Conflict" and Its Consequences!.

== Helper's racism ==
Abolitionists mostly ignored the fact that Helper was an adamant white supremacist. His goal in writing the book, as he says, was to help Southern whites, not Blacks. According to him, Blacks were inferior to whites, and there was no place for them in the United States; after emancipation, they should be removed from the country, he said. "A. B. Burdick, the publisher of The Impending Crisis, testified that Helper ... avoided all contacts with Negroes, refusing even to patronize hotels or restaurants which employed Negroes in menial capacities. Another man who knew Helper before the war recalled that 'he has always been inflexibly opposed to all the relations and conditions which have kept the two races close together, and this ... was one of the principal grounds of his opposition to slavery."
