= Hinton Rowan Helper =

American writer (1829–1909)

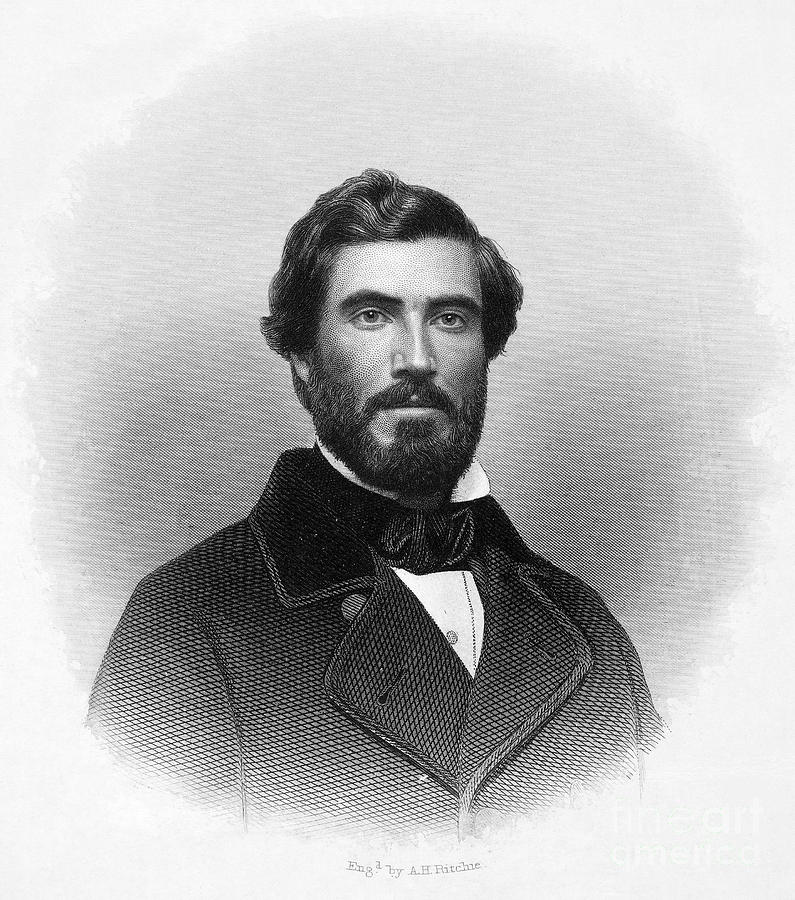
- Helper c. 1860
- Born: December 27, 1829; Mocksville, North Carolina, U.S.
- Died: March 9, 1909 (aged 79); Washington, D.C., U.S.
- Writing career
- Notable work: The Impending Crisis of the South

Signature
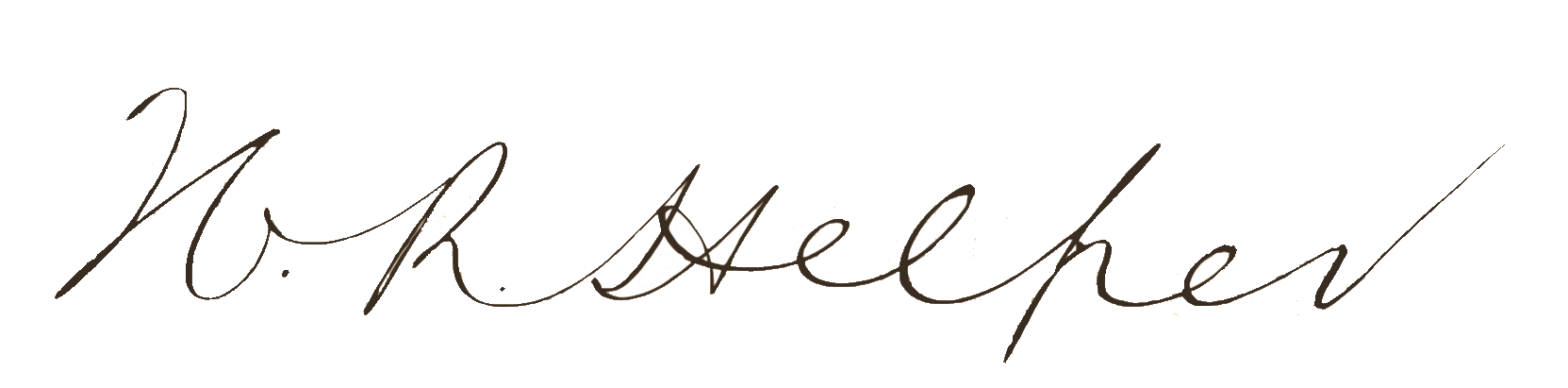

Hinton Rowan Helper (December 27, 1829 – March 9, 1909) was an American writer and abolitionist, even though racism was "the ruling passion of his life". In 1857, he published a book that he dedicated to the "non-slaveholding whites" of the South. Titled The Impending Crisis of the South: How to Meet It and written partly in North Carolina but published when the author was in the Northern United States, it argued that slavery hurt the economic prospects of non-slaveholders and was an impediment to the economic growth of the entire South. Anger over his book due to the belief he was acting as an agent of the North attempting to split Southerners along class lines led to Southern denunciations of "Helperism."

== Life and career ==
Helper "(originally Helfer: his grandfather had come from Heidelberg)" was born near Mocksville, North Carolina. He was the son of a small slave-owning farmer in Western North Carolina. His father died before Helper was a year old, but he was cared for by a wealthy extended family and obtained a good education with the financial help of his uncle. He graduated from Mocksville Academy in 1848 and went to California in 1851 hoping to get rich, but he came back in 1854, disillusioned.

In 1855 Helper published The Land of Gold; Reality versus Fiction, in which, Edmund Wilson writes, he "attempted to tell, incidentally, of his discovery in the course of his travels that slave labor was less profitable than free labor and in Baltimore, where the book was to be published, he had run into a Maryland statute, dating from 1831, which made it a felony with a penalty of not less than ten years in jail knowingly to write or print anything 'having a tendency to excite discontent ... amongst the people of color'.... Compelled to excise these comments, Hinton Helper — an irascible man — resolved to speak out his whole mind in a book devoted entirely to this subject." The book was The Impending Crisis of the South: How to Meet It. Expressing Helper's deep opposition to slavery as the cause of the benighted condition of Southern culture and the South's lack of economic progress, it was one of the most effective criticisms ever written of the South.

Helper argued that the South's growth, prosperity, and cultural development were being held back by slavery. He deployed statistics from the census to show that land values, literacy levels, and manufacturing rates were considerably lower in the South than in the North. He warned of the devastation caused by slavery through deforestation. He proposed that slaveholders be taxed to colonize all free blacks in Africa or Latin America.

The success of The Impending Crisis of the South made Helper famous overnight. It also heightened the political crisis by raising fears among Southerners that poor landless Southern whites might turn against slavery if they saw that it did not benefit them. The fear of class divisions within the white community was enough to lead many Southerners who had previously been opponents of secession to embrace it after the election of Abraham Lincoln.

Lincoln appointed Helper as United States consul in Buenos Aires in 1861; he served there until 1866.

After the war, Helper urged the wholesale expulsion of former slaves. He believed the United States should be exclusively white, also excluding Chinese, Native Americans, and other non-white groups. "A. B. Burdick, the publisher of The Impending Crisis, testified that Helper ... avoided all contacts with Negroes, refusing even to patronize hotels or restaurants which employed Negroes in menial capacities. Another man who knew Helper before the war recalled that 'he has always been inflexibly opposed to all the relations and conditions which have kept the two races close together; and this ... was one of the principal grounds of his opposition to slavery." Nevertheless, Southern enemies of Reconstruction were unwilling to forgive his previous opposition to slavery, and he remained a marginal and increasingly unstable character in the postwar United States.

In 1867, Helper published Nojoque: Question for a Continent, which Civil War historian Bruce Catton called "what must be the most bitter anti-Negro diatribe ever written in America" and Manisha Sinha branded as a "racist screed" that "identified black people as the bane of the Americas". In the book, Helper compared Black people to "hyenas, jackals, wolves, skunks, rats, snakes, scorpions, [and] spiders", and said that they "are not upon this earth to be preserved and loved, but, under the unobstructed and salutary operation of the laws of nature, to be permitted to decay and die, and then disappear, at once and forever, down, down, deep down, in the vortex of oblivion!"

Helper spent most of the postwar years promoting a scheme to build an intercontinental railroad connecting North and South America, which would help replace black and brown peoples with whites. As expounded in his book Three Americas Railway (1881), the proposed road would extend from the Bering Sea to the Strait of Magellan. His proposal came to nothing, and he died by suicide by turning on the gas in his Washington, D.C. apartment.

== The Impending Crisis of the South ==
Helper's book, which was a combination of statistical charts and provocative prose, attracted little attention when it was published in 1857, but in 1859 it was widely distributed in a condensed volume called the Compendium, with the endorsement of a number of Republican leaders.

Helper concluded that slavery hurt the Southern economy by preventing economic development and industrialization and was the main reason why the South's economic progress was inferior to the North's (according to the results of the 1850 census). Helper spoke on behalf of the majority of Southern whites of moderate means—the Plain Folk of the Old South—who he said were oppressed by a small but politically dominant aristocracy of wealthy slave owners. According to W. E. B. Du Bois, Andrew Johnson "early became a follower" of Helper, and "used his figures".

The reaction in the South was extremely negative. John Spencer Bassett studied the issue and concluded that distributing The Impending Crisis could be the basis of criminal charges. Politicians often accused each other of having read it, but many of the most successful politicians read it and used its observations of the negative effects of slavery as the basis of their attempts to solve some of the problems Helper pointed out were caused by the slave system.

In his 1867 essay, "War of races. By whom it is sought to be brought about. Considered in two letters, with copious extracts from the recent work of Hilton [sic] R. Helper", John Harmer Gilmer calls Helper "a profane miscreant", one of many insults directed at Helper in that essay.

The book has few references to black people; its focus is on denouncing slavery as an economic institution. It generated a furor in the South, where authorities banned its possession and distribution and burned copies that it seized. Between 1857 and 1861, nearly 150,000 copies of the book were circulated. "In December 1859 Democrats returning to Congress reacted with astonishment and indignation when it was discovered that sixty-eight Republicans had endorsed a shortened compendium version to be used as campaign literature in the presidential election of 1860". Opponents blocked the election of Republican John Sherman as speaker because he had endorsed the Compendium.

== Legacy ==
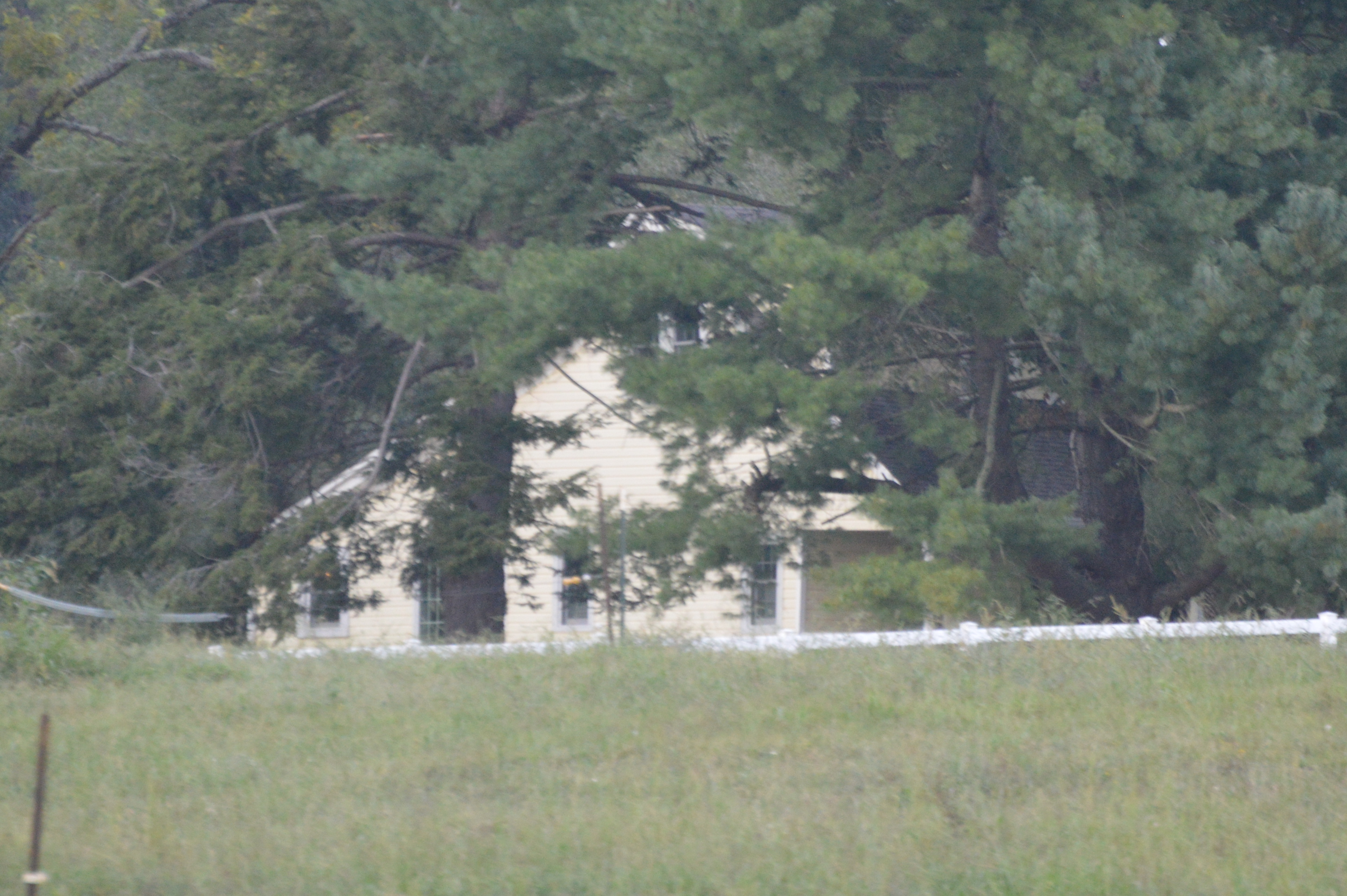
Helper's house near Mocksville

- The Hinton Rowan Helper House was Helper's residence from 1829 to 1849 and is a designated National Historic Landmark.
- Liberty ship SS Hinton R. Helper. See List of Liberty ships (G–Je)

== Primary sources ==
=== Helper's works ===
- Helper, Hinton Rowan (1855). The Land of Gold; Reality versus Fiction. Baltimore: Published for the author, by Henry Taylor.
- Various editions of The Impending Crisis

- 1857 text of The Impending Crisis at the University of North Carolina
- Compendium of the Impending Crisis of the South: How to Meet It (1859 version online)
- The Impending Crisis of the South: How to Meet It (1860 edition) online version
- The Impending Crisis of the South: How to Meet It (1968). Fredrickson, George M., ed. and author of a 55-page introduction. Cambridge, Massachusetts: The Belknap Press of Harvard University Press.

- Nojoque: A Question for a Continent (1867) Manisha Sinha calls this book a "racist screed" that "identified black people as the bane of the Americas".
- The Negroes in Negroland; The Negroes in America; And Negroes Generally. Also, the Several Races of White Men, Considered as the Involuntary and Predestined Supplanters of the Black Races (1868). New York: G.W. Carleton (George Washington Carleton; 1832–1901); London: S. Low, Son, & Co. 1868 – via Internet Archive ("A compilation, by Hinton Rowan Helper, a rational Republican") LCCN 12-2994; OCLC 277206353 (all editions)
- Noonday Exigencies in America (1871) online
- Oddments of Andean Diplomacy, and other oddment (1879) online
- The Three Americas Railway (1881)

=== Works by other authors ===
- War of races. By whom it is sought to be brought about. Considered in two letters, with copious extracts from the recent work of Hilton R. Helper, by John Harmer Gilmer (1867)
- A Book for the impending Crisis! Appeal to the common sense and patriotism of the people of the United States. Helperism Annihilated! The "irrepressible conflict" and its consequences! by Louis Schade of Iowa, 1860

== See also ==
- Fire-Eaters, pro-slavery Southerners.
- Arthur Kemp, who wrote an essay, "The Lie of Apartheid", which argued that apartheid was in fact an impracticable and unworkable system that led directly to the Afrikaners' demise as a political force in that country.
- William E. Stevenson, accused of sedition against the state for circulating Helper's book
- The Redneck Manifesto, a book discussing what the author claims is the disenfranchisement of lower-class White people.
