= Charleston Arsenal =

US Army arsenal facility in South Carolina

- Porter Military Academy
- U.S. National Register of Historic Places
- U.S. Historic district
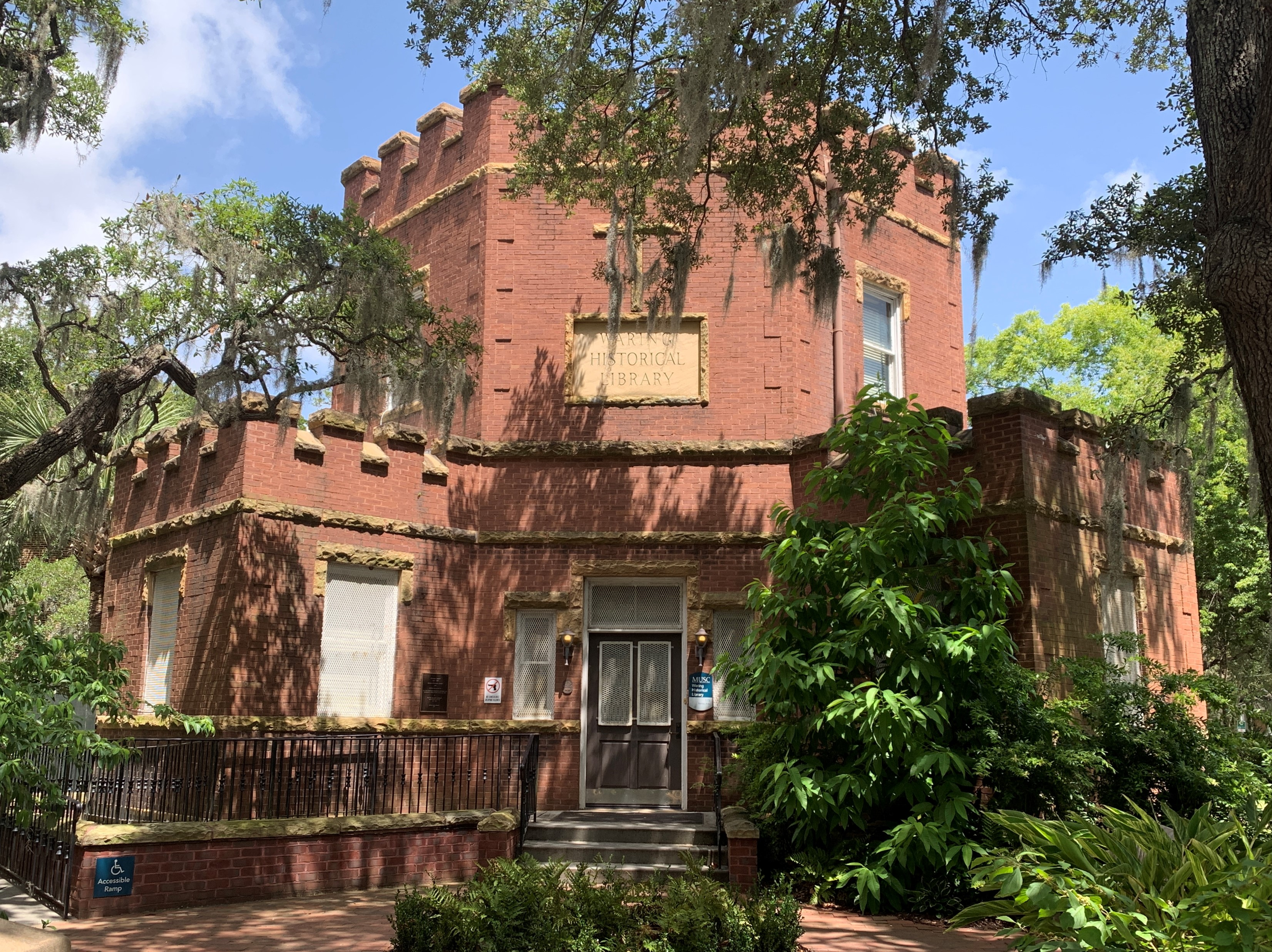
- The octagonal Waring Library, built by Porter Military Academy, in 2020

- Location within South Carolina Location within the United States
- Location: 175-181 Ashley Ave., Charleston, South Carolina
- Coordinates: 32°47′12″N 79°56′52″W
- Area: 1.1 acres (0.45 ha)
- Built: 1862
- Architect: Bell, Holten; Snook, John Butler
- Architectural style: Greek Revival, Late Gothic Revival, Octagon Mode
- NRHP reference No.: 96000685
- Added to NRHP: June 21, 1996

The Charleston Arsenal was a United States Army arsenal facility in Charleston, South Carolina, seized by state militia at the outbreak of the American Civil War.

The arsenal was constructed between 1825 and 1832 by the United States government near the intersection of Ashley Avenue and Mill Street in Charleston. It served as a storage place for weapons, ordnance, and ammunition for the U.S. Army in antebellum days. (An earlier Federal arsenal, the Old Citadel, was taken out of service and after became a part of The Citadel.) The Charleston arsenal produced a considerable amount of artillery and small arms ammunition during the Mexican–American War and up to the Civil War.

With the secession of South Carolina in December 1860, the Arsenal became a target for Charleston militia. South Carolina troops seized the arsenal in late December, and the Confederates held it for much of the war. Josiah Gorgas had the arsenal enlarged and modernized with the installation of steam power. For a time, it was used a barracks to house Confederate troops, including the 26th South Carolina. The arsenal was retaken by Union troops in 1865 when Charleston finally fell.

On July 16, 1866, the U.S. government designated the 11.26-acre (4.56 ha) site as a Federal Military Reservation, but in 1879 the Army closed the arsenal. The building and land were sold in 1888, to the Porter Military Academy which occupied the site until it built a new campus west of the Ashley River, and in 1963 the site became part of the Medical University of South Carolina.

== St. Luke's Chapel ==
The only building remaining from the Arsenal is St. Luke's Chapel. The chapel eventually became part of the Porter Military Academy. In 1883 Dr. Porter converted the artillery shed into a chapel. The building served Porter Academy students from 1883 to 1965. Now all three buildings are currently owned by the Medical University of South Carolina (MUSC). On June 21, 1996, it was added to the National Register of Historic Places as Porter Military Academy.

== See also ==
- Porter-Gaud School
