= Southern chivalry =

19th-century cultural concept of the Southern U.S.

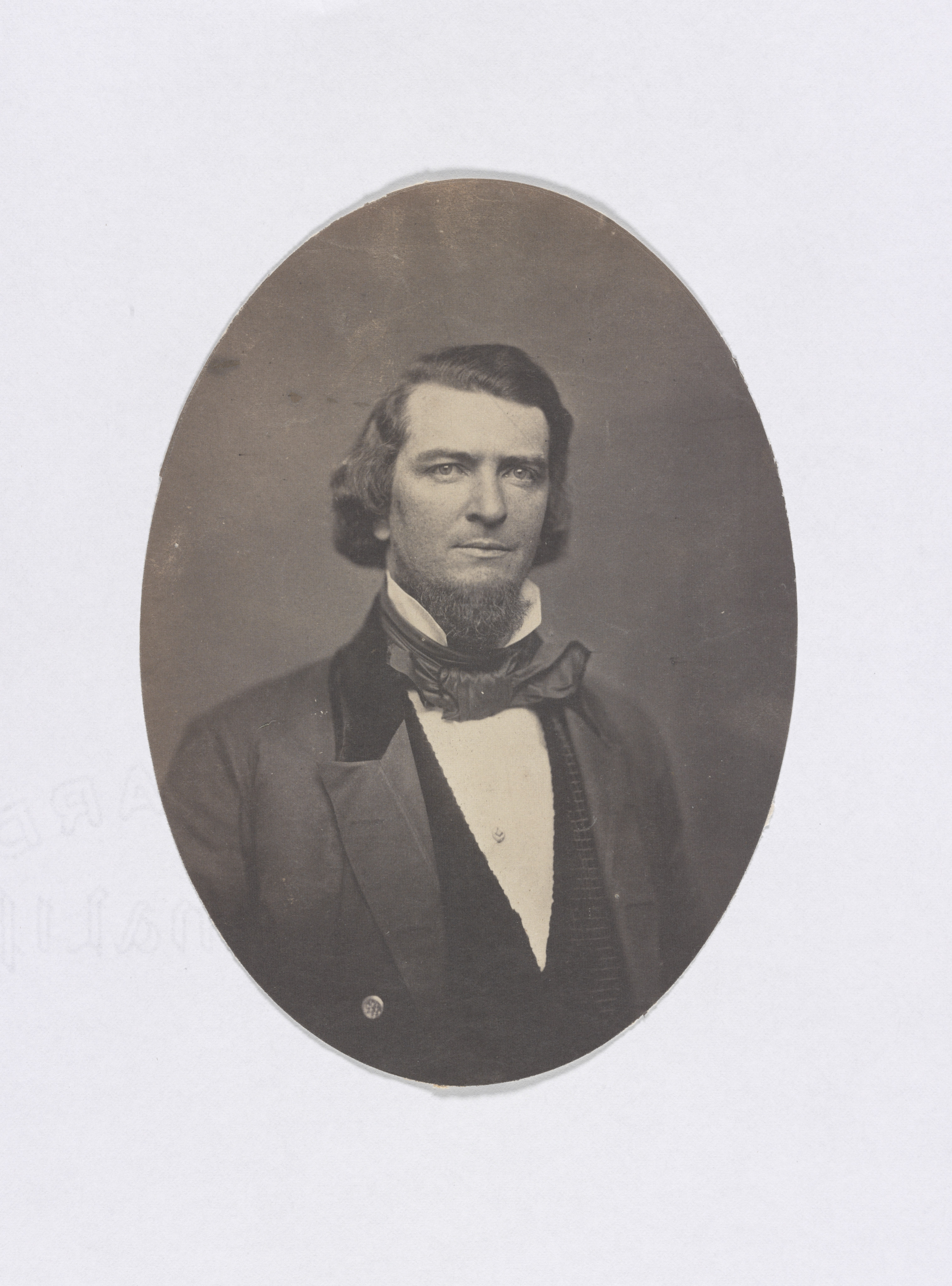
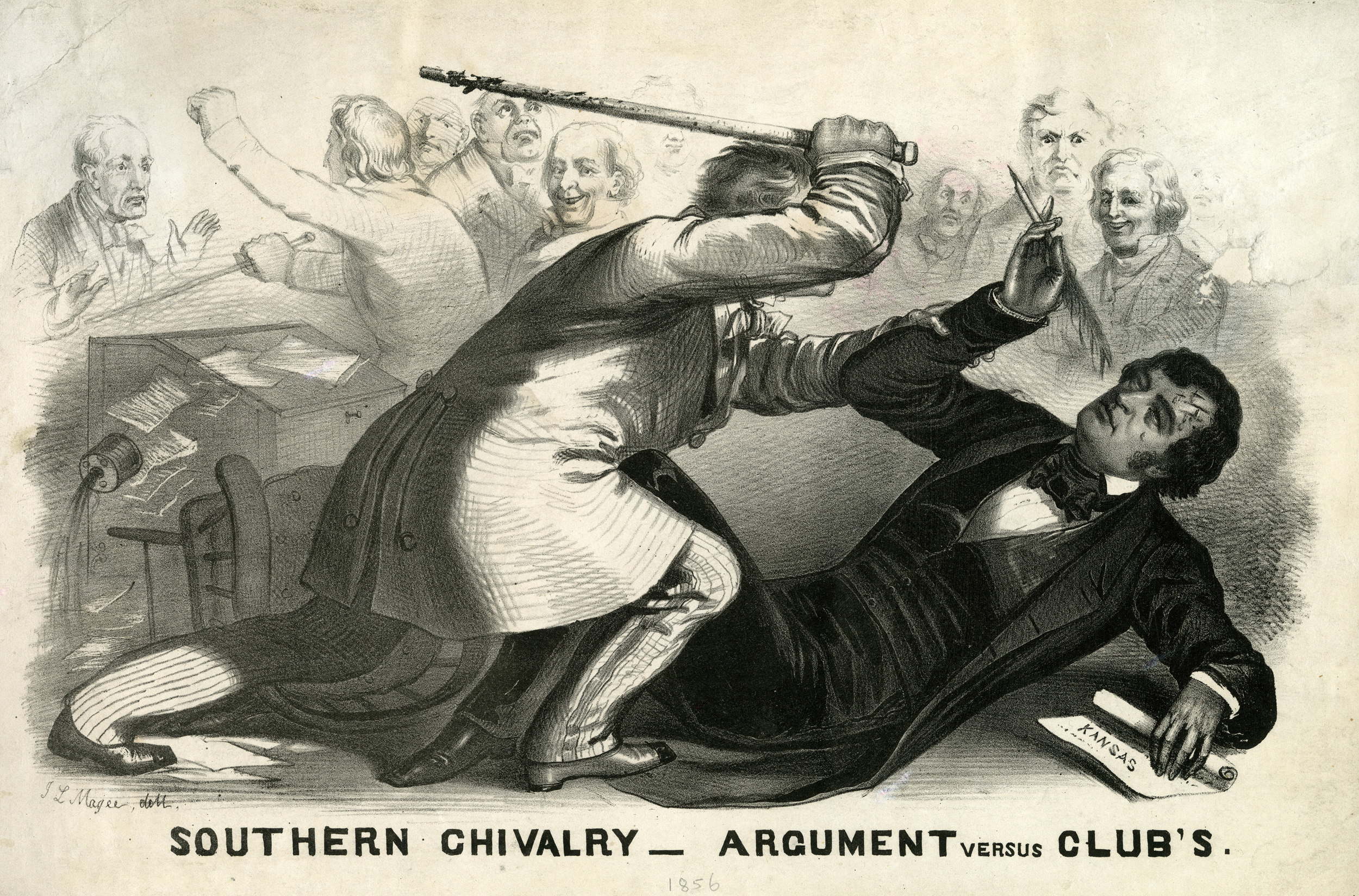
Representative Preston Brooks, who claimed the Southern code of honor as cause for physically attacking an abolitionist on the floor of the U.S. Congress; Condemned as "argument versus clubs" in one of many Northern caricatures of "Southern Chivalry"

Southern chivalry, or the Cavalier myth, was a popular concept describing the aristocratic honor culture of the Southern United States during the Antebellum, Civil War, and early Postbellum eras. The archetype of a Southern gentleman became popular as a chivalric ideal of the slave-owning planter class, emphasizing both familial and personal honor in addition to the ability to defend either by force if necessary. Southern chivalry is today seen as an attempt to justify the racist and patriarchal stratification of Southern society, with the goal of maintaining or legitimizing the human rights abuses of American slavery.

Prior to the Civil War this concept of a gentleman's honor was frequently used as a basis for duels and other forms of extrajudicial violence, most notably the caning of Charles Sumner by Preston Brooks, and contributed to the militarization of the South by encouraging young men to be taught at military schools.

By the later Antebellum era, the term had taken on an ironic meaning for Northerners and abolitionists, among whom it was used as a pejorative to describe what was perceived as the barbarism of Southern slave owners and their hostility and duplicity in dealing with the North, as was particularly seen in various political caricatures before and during the war.

In the modern era the romanticization of Southern chivalry became a core aspect of the Lost Cause myth, which portrays the Confederate States of America as a morally and culturally superior civilization defending its honor against a materialistic and immoral North.

== Values ==
During the Antebellum period the culture of the Southern aristocracy was, according to some historians, loosely codified as a chivalric Southern code, emphasizing the quasi-feudal ability of a Southern gentleman, or Cavalier, (Note: Spelled Chevalier in primary sources of the time.) to control his dependents, including both white family members and black chattel slaves. A sense of rivalry against the rest of the Union is described as pervading much of Southern culture during the Antebellum years, when "Exuberant southerners meant to draw [Northerners' attentions] to such presumed aristocratic virtues as gallantry, classical education, polished manners, a high sense of personal and family honor, and contempt for money-grubbing."

Young men of the upper class were expected to be educated in courage, conduct, and the humanities from an early age, including both Victorian literature and the Greek classics. Such men would then be expected to be sent to a military school, with many military leaders on either side of the Civil War having received their training from such institutions across the South. "Knight" and "knightly" entered common parlance as impactful terms of admiration for virility and masculinity.

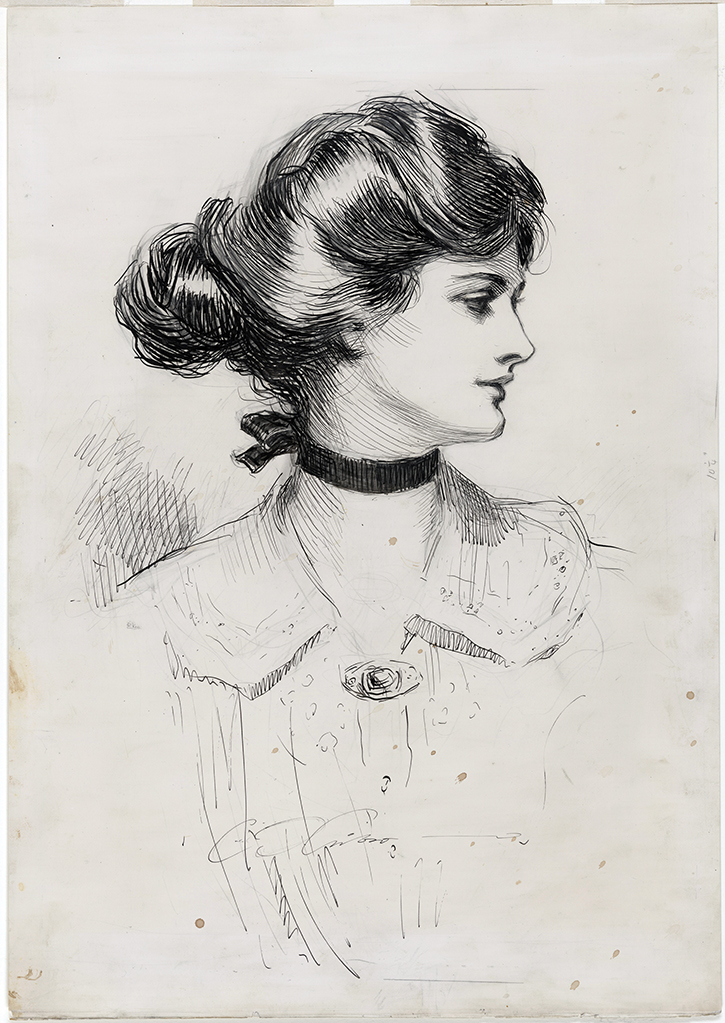
The belle as the archetypal Daughter of the South, by Charles Dana Gibson (1909)

Southern chivalry also placed great importance on upholding the strict gender roles seen among white Southerners of the time, encouraging a division between strong, educated gentlemen and demure, submissive belles. The Southern woman was seen as inferior to her husband but nonetheless an embodiment of grace and purity whose defense from disgrace was considered a core duty of the dominant gentleman, such that Julian S. Carr is reported as openly boasting how he had "horsewhipped a Negro wench until her skirts hung in shreds because [...] she had publicly insulted and maligned a Southern lady." (Note: See Silent Sam for the context of Carr's address.)

The use of the Cavalier myth ultimately cultivated a fictionalized image of what Encyclopedia Virginia described as a "benevolent male authority" across the region's history, enforcing a patriarchal narrative of the upper classes at the expense of black slaves, free women, and other marginalized workers responsible for the economic successes of the South. Rather than expressing actual moral values of the South, the concept of a Southern gentleman is instead argued to have served to justify widespread slavery by recasting the relationship between master and slave as a noble, paternal one rather than the coercive and exploitative reality. Southern encyclopedist Charles Reagan Wilson argues that "[e]lites used the mythology of Cavaliers and moonlight-and-magnolias plantations to construct a romantic region that obscured differences across the South's regions and among its social groupings."

In 1945, Old South apologist Richard M. Weaver instead defended Southern chivalry as a necessary, if violent and culturally regressive, mechanism to preserve the rules of war originally developed by the upper classes of various nations during their progression out of the European Dark Ages, and lamented the breakdown of such rules during the Civil War as prophetic of the industrialized warfare and mass killing of the world wars era.

== History ==
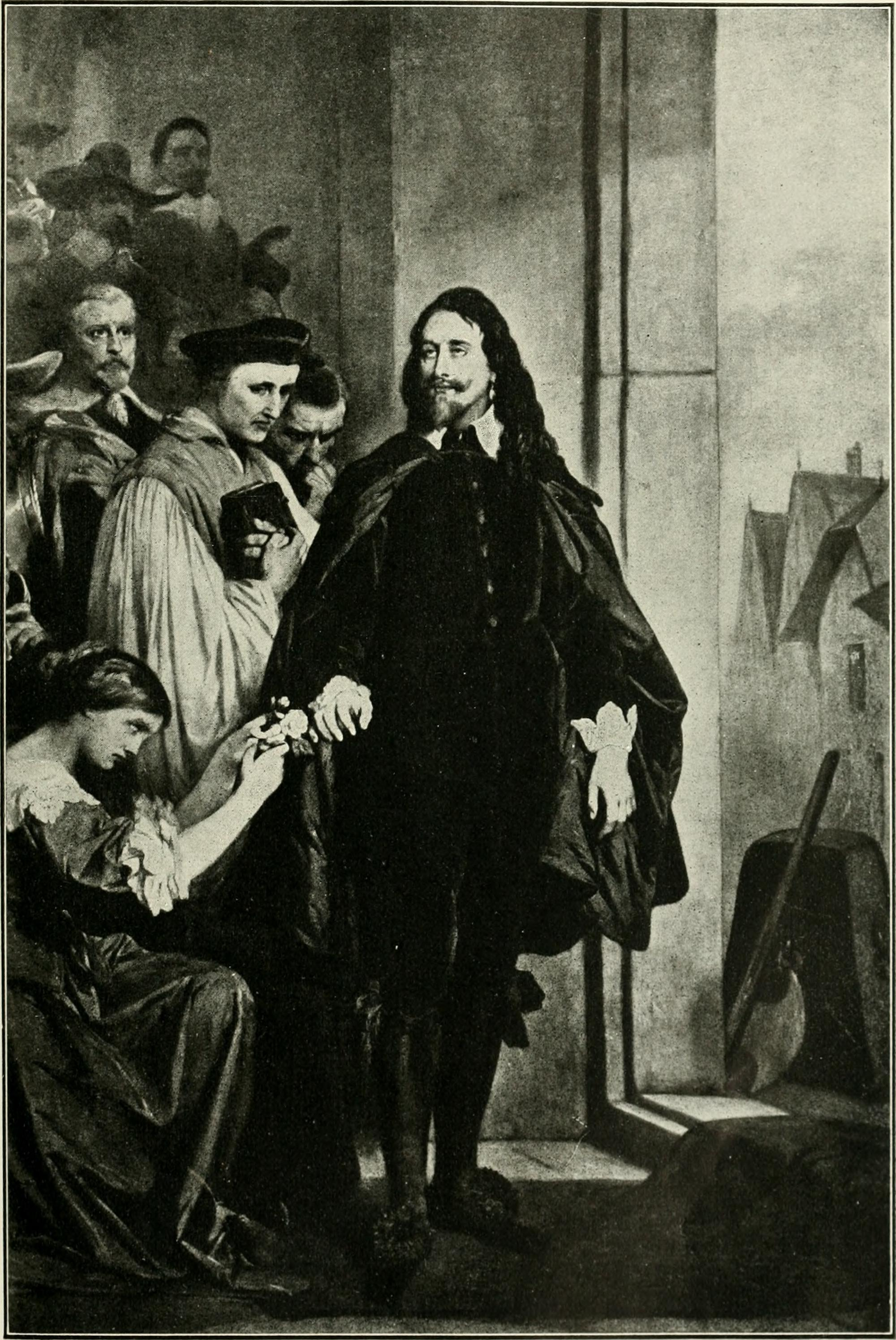
1913 book illustration of Charles I of England, leader of the Cavaliers, at his execution

Popular concepts of a Southern aristocracy originated with the heritage of the "Old South" as the colonial possessions of the British Empire, when the meteoric growth of the plantation industry led to the entrenchment of wealthy landowners as a dominant socially and politically conservative planter class. This aristocracy modeled itself after the old British gentry, with the Cavalier and Southern gentleman myths developing in response to a wider 19th-century nostalgia for the knightly aristocracy of the English Middle Ages. (Note: This is something argued to have been seen elsewhere in the Anglosphere with Tennyson's rechristening of Prince Albert as "Albert the Good" in emulation of the Arthurian Epics.) Later nationalist narratives in particular claimed white Southerners' descent from the Norman knights of William the Conqueror, "a race [...] renowned for its gallantry, chivalry, its honor, its gentleness, and its intellect".

The concept of the Cavalier was instead introduced to the continent through the Virginia Cavaliers and other Royalists of the English Civil Wars, who the Cavalier myth incorrectly states fled to Virginia en masse after their defeat. This original historical archetype of the Old South Royalist, now indicating a gentleman distinguished by his gallantry and code of conduct rather than the original political inclination, (Note: The Encyclopedia Virginia points to the anti-Crown populism of the American Revolutionary War as a cause behind this depoliticization of the concept, with the Virginian George Washington, grandson of planter Royalist John Washington, as a new ideal of a knightly, sophisticated gentleman.) was further elevated to a folk hero or stock character by American "Cavalier" fiction as it and other forms of Anglo-Saxon nostalgia flourished throughout the 1800s. Theodore Goodridge Roberts and Molly Elliot Seawell dealt with the Virginia Cavaliers directly in their fiction, which became influential in the South alongside the more general strain of Medievalist writers like Walter Scott.

The knightly and Christian values described in such works were seen by proponents as arising to a unique degree in the Southern states as opposed to the more bourgeois North, allowing the gentlemen planters to be easily reimagined as landed knights defending the white Southerners' wealth and culture. Northerners, in response, quickly co-opted Medievalist language as a point of derision against a South they saw as a rural backwater led by regressive aristocrats "[as] idle, ignorant, dissolute, and ferocious as that medieval chivalry to which they are fond of comparing themselves", a negative view which has since been supported by many mainstream historians.

=== Duels and violence ===
Dueling was as present in the 19th-Century Southern states as elsewhere in the English-speaking world, causing many deaths among upper-class gentlemen in spite of increasingly strict regulations against such violence. While the practice remained in vogue across the United States it turned particularly deadly in the South, where martial ability was extolled as a measure of a Cavalier's worthiness and refusing a challenge would lead to "posting," a type of public ostracism as a coward; "[D]ueling remained the preferred way to defend one's honor – or even to commit murder. A jilted lover need only wait for a rival's insult, or even manufacture one. He was then free to challenge and kill the rival without condemnation." Duels were also restricted to contests between gentlemen of equal rank, with Weaver comparing these formal arrangements to the knightly tournaments of the Middle Ages to argue that such gentlemen saw this gamification of combat as the line of separation between themselves and the various "uncivilized" peoples they opposed. Congressional politics were no stranger to the spectacle, though Southern politicians preferred to challenge one another over their Northern opponents, believing those less honorable than themselves could not be trusted to follow the formal rules of dueling.

==== Preston Brooks ====
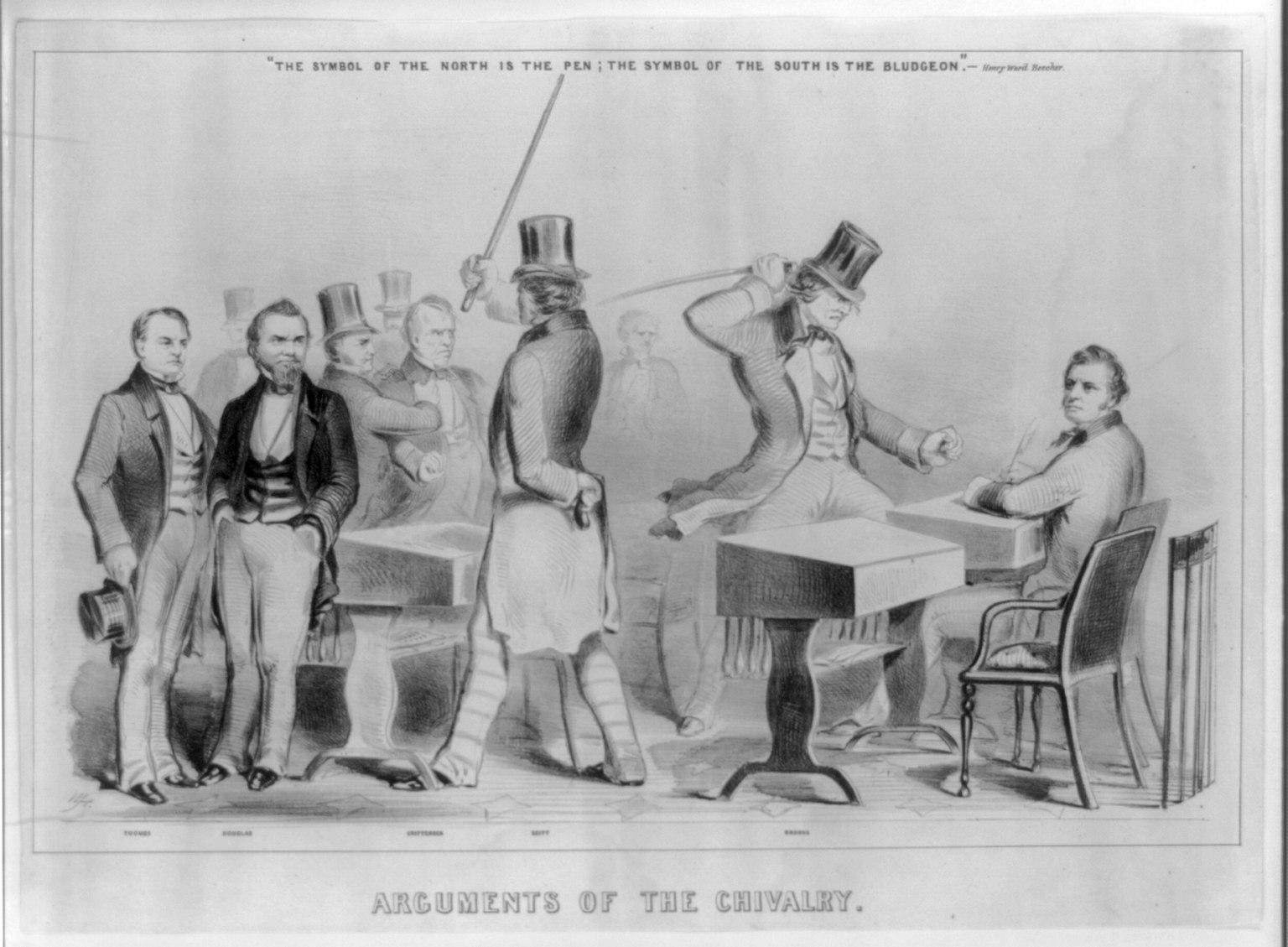
"Arguments of the Chivalry", John Henry Bufford with a quote by Henry Ward Beecher

Some of the most enduring invocations of Southern honor in both the original and ironic senses come from the Brooks-Sumner affair, which occurred after abolitionist Charles Sumner gave a charged speech on the admission of north American territories as slave states, titled "the Crime Against Kansas." (Note: See the Bleeding Kansas crisis for further context.) Sumner's speech personally attacked South Carolina Senator Andrew Butler for his activity in favor of this slave power, seeking to present Butler's defense of slavery as a deluded obsession while arguing his sense of chivalry to be closer to that of the satirical Alonso Quijano from Don Quixote than heroes of the actual Medieval romances favored by the Southern elite:

The senator from South Carolina has read many books of chivalry, and believes himself a chivalrous knight with sentiments of honor and courage. Of course he has chosen a mistress to whom he has made his vows, and who, though ugly to others, is always lovely to him; though polluted in the sight of the world, is chaste in his sight—I mean the harlot, Slavery. For her, his tongue is always profuse in words. Let her be impeached in character, or any proposition made to shut her out from the extension of her wantonness, and no extravagance of manner or hardihood of assertion is then too great for this senator. The frenzy of Don Quixote, in behalf of his wench, Dulcinea del Toboso, is all surpassed.

Preston Brooks, a relative of Butler's, became determined to defend Butler's honor; He originally intended to challenge Sumner to a duel, but was convinced by a fellow representative that "A duel was the means by which social equals proved their honor; social inferiors, on the other hand, could be more summarily beaten with a cane." Brooks then attacked Sumner on the floor of the Old Senate Chamber on May 22nd, terming his speech libel against South Carolina. The uproar over the event in the North portrayed Sumner as a martyr and the attack as an act of dishonor and hypocrisy, with John L. Magee's particularly famous political caricature depicting Brooks as a savage and faceless assailant assisted or jeered on by fellow Southerners alongside a caption noting the perceived dissonance between the beliefs of the Southern gentlemen and their actions.

=== Civil War and modern era ===
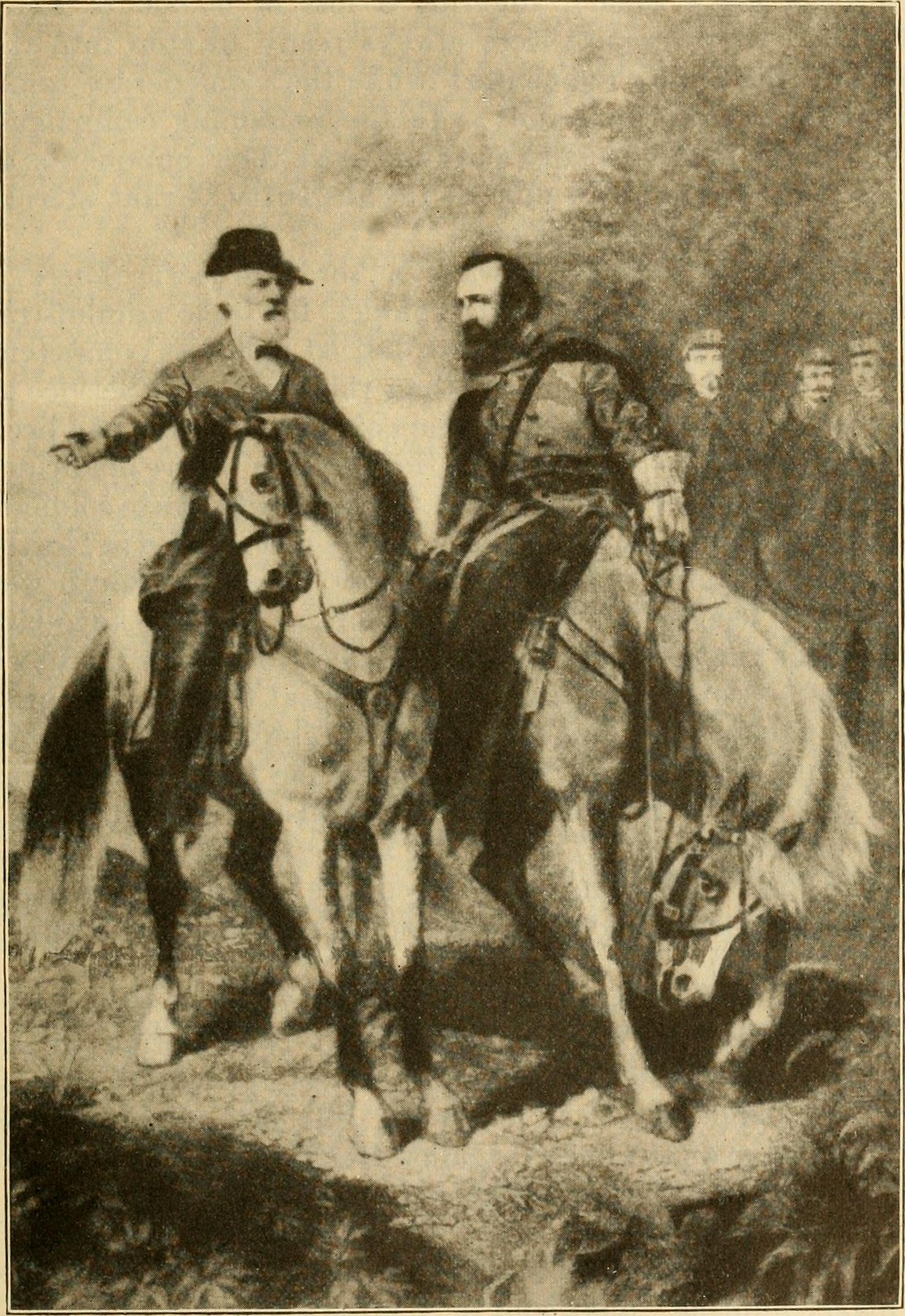
A romanticized depiction of the "splendid chivalry" of the Confederate leadership (1922)

By the outbreak of the Civil War, Weaver argues, the concept of Southern chivalry had become well known among both Northerners and Southerners. Like the gentlemanly duels of the antebellum era, many Southerners had hoped for the war to be a test of their masculinity against that of the North, leading to premature declarations of a Confederate moral victory as early as the First Battle of Manassas, or Bull Run, and subsequent expressions of dismay at the conflict's eventual degeneration into total warfare in place of the "Christian soldiery" attempted by Southern troops. Weaver attempts to distinguish high-born Confederates like John B. Gordon, Robert E. Lee, or Jefferson Davis, who balked at unconventional forms of warfare, espoused admiration for Ulysses S. Grant and other Unionists thought to have proven themselves in battle, or sought to preserve the honor of white Northerners under their occupation, from low-born officers like John S. Mosby or Stonewall Jackson, who instead conformed to the Northern middle-class view of the war as a "simple destruction" of one's opponents. (Note: Weaver in this context highlights the disproportionate demonization of William Tecumseh Sherman over Grant although the latter had the far greater impact on the Confederates' ultimate prospects over the former.)

Confederate leaders made heavy use of the same medievalist language that had defined the Antebellum aristocracy, with Davis and others referring to the Confederacy's generals as 'knights' or 'Cavaliers' both during and after the war. A journalist termed P. G. T. Beauregard a "Sir Galahad" of the South's values.

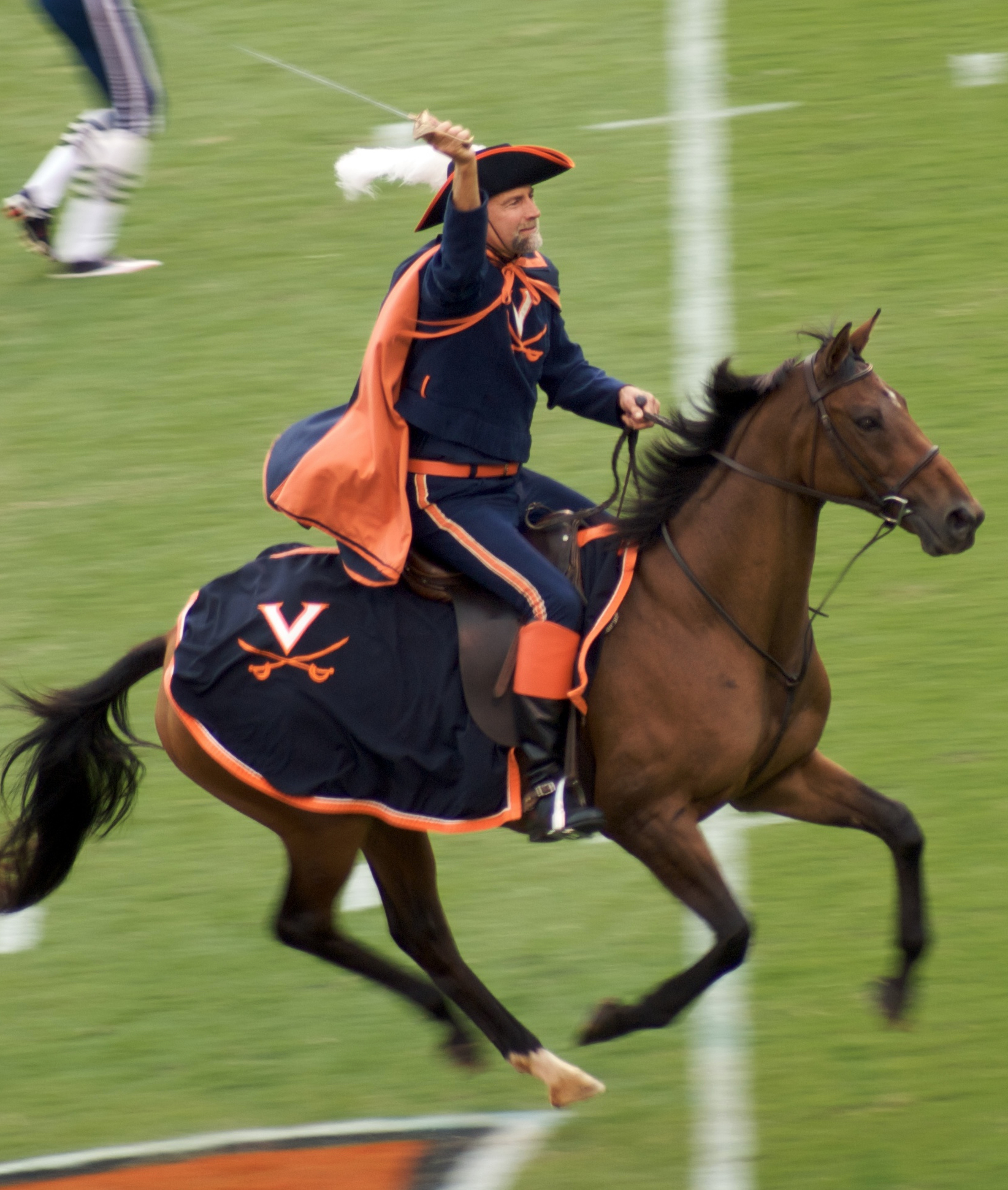
The eponymous "Cav Man" mascot of the Virginia Cavaliers, 2009

Forsyth provided an understanding of Postbellum readings of William Shakespeare's Othello as a paradoxically-sympathetic "Southern hero," who is, in spite of his race, so bound by a gentleman's duty to preserve the honor of the white women around him that he ends the play by murdering Desdemona for what he believes to be her infidelity. The first-wave feminist and former slaveowner Rebecca Latimer Felton cited a chivalric value, the duty of gentlemen to provide and care for a lady, when she petitioned for women's suffrage in 1915, and public figures extolled states well into the postbellum years like South Carolina as standing "for culture, for chivalry, and for exalted citizenship, for higher ideals than which no people ever possessed."

The swashbuckling plume-hatted Virginia Cavalier endures as a popular symbol of the state, including the Virginia Cavaliers sports teams of the University of Virginia.

== Lost Cause ==
Lost Cause proponents seek to present Southerners as tragic heroes fighting for the supposed moral ideals of the Confederacy, arguing that the Northern military victory came about due to an overwhelming industrial and numerical advantage where the Confederacy instead won its victories through the superior prowess and mettle of the average Rebel soldier and his noble leaders. The New Georgia Encyclopedia closely compares the Lost Cause to a social religion, while Laura Brodie identified the early canonization of Robert E. Lee as a Messianic "Saint of the South" with the Victorian English "cult of mourning" in the wake of the death of Prince Albert.

Assertions of an honorable lost cause of the Confederacy became ubiquitous as the country attempted to rebuild the union between North and South, including the rebranding of the Civil War as a "War of Northern Aggression" to fallaciously argue that "while southerners were a people of honor and purity, Northerners were invaders, a people consumed by lust for power." Works of popular culture like Gone with the Wind (1939) repeatedly extolled the Antebellum South as a lost country of "Cavaliers and Cotton Fields".

Historian Rollin G. Osterweis identified the "chivalric planter", alongside the Southern belle, the Uncle Remus, and the Confederate veteran, "once a knight of the field and saddle", as the founding stock characters of what later coalesced into the Lost Cause myth.

Confederate apologia additionally flourished during the Golden Age of Fraternalism that manifested in large part in the universities of the South, including the Knights of the White Camelia from Louisiana and the Kappa Alpha Order of Virginia. The Ku Klux Klan also made frequent use of terms like "Knight" or "Empire" in their internal vocabulary and hierarchy.

== Gallery ==
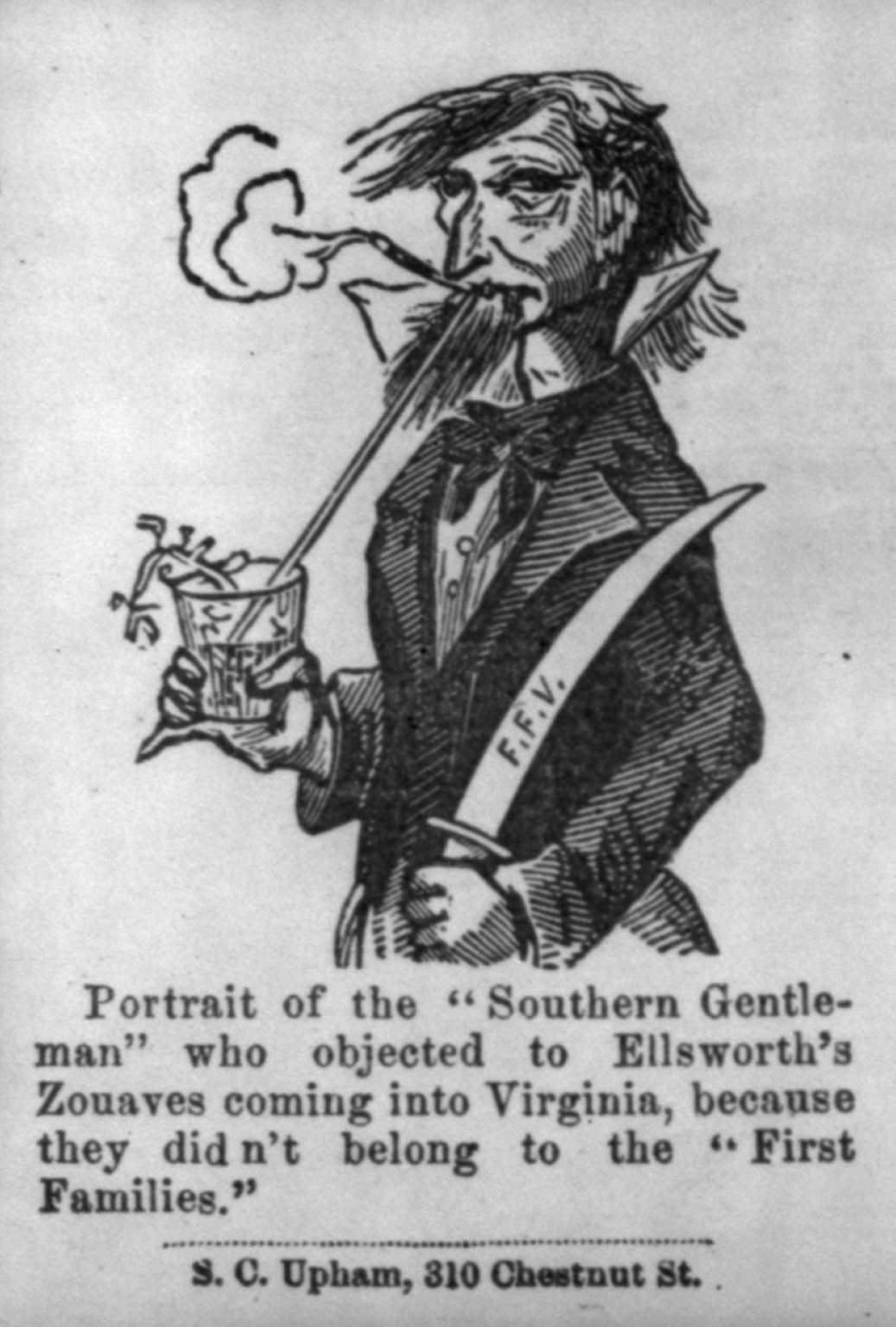
Caricature of the "Southern Gentleman", Union Envelopes

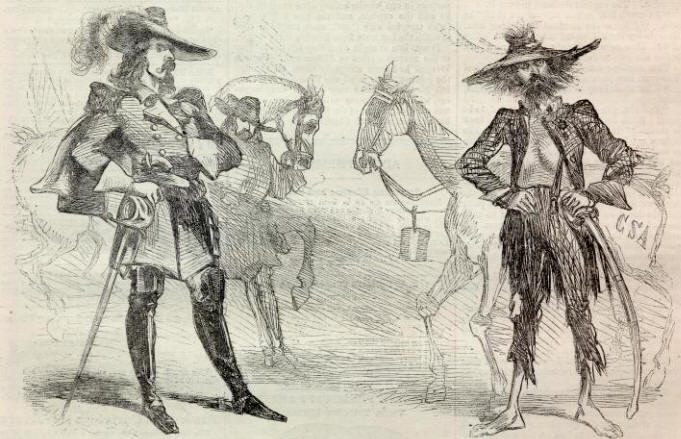
Caricature of "Rebel Chivalry" during the Maryland Campaign, Harper's Weekly

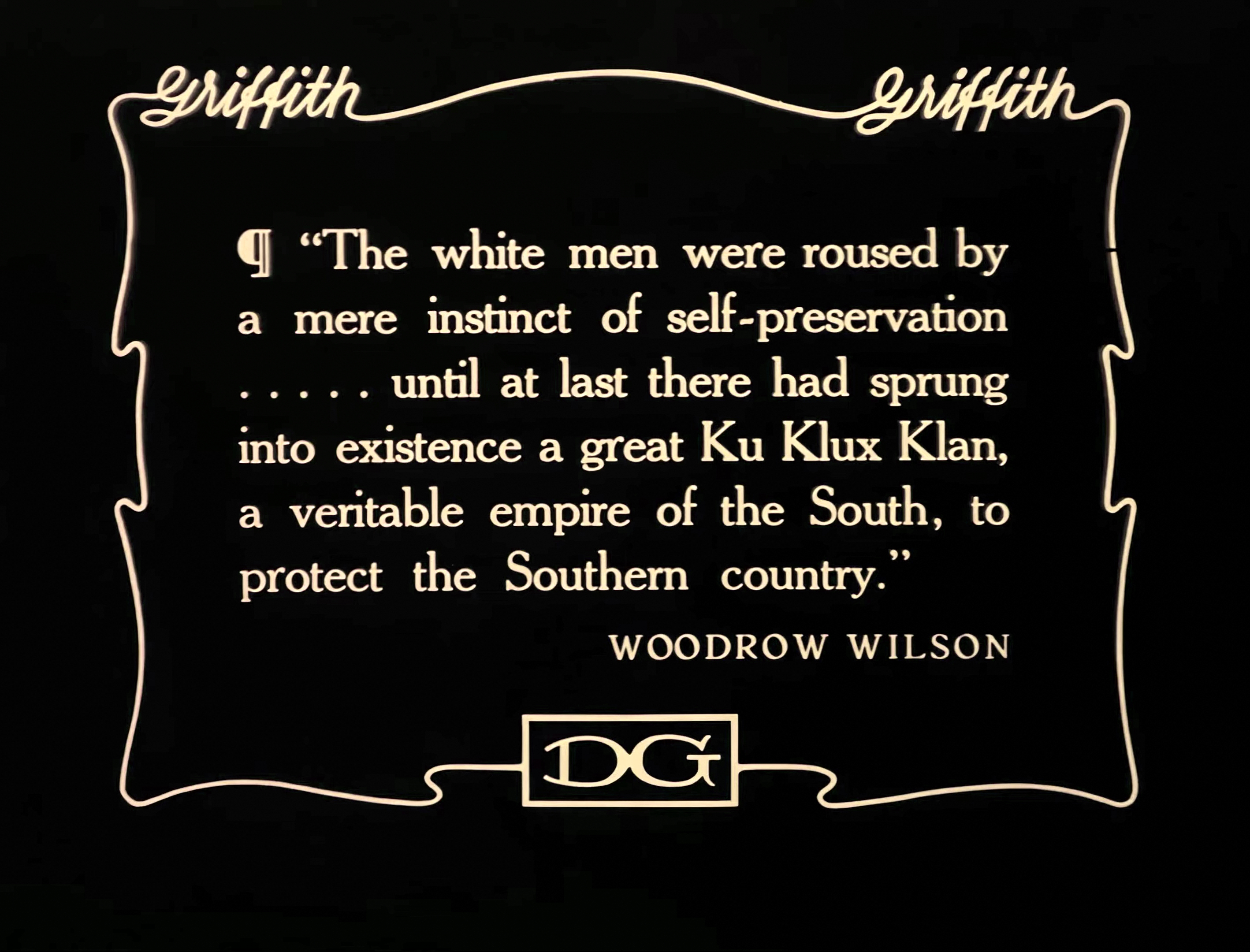
A quote from Woodrow Wilson used in an intertitle from The Birth of a Nation.

== See also ==
- History of the Southern United States
- United Confederate Veterans – American Civil War veterans' organization for soldiers and sailors of the CSA
- United Daughters of the Confederacy – American hereditary association
  - Southern Cross of Honor – American medal for Confederate veterans (1899–1959)
- Romanticism – Artistic and intellectual movement
- Sarmatism — a similar phenomenon in the Polish–Lithuanian Commonwealth
- Christianity in the United States
- List of duels in the United States
- List of Confederate duels
- Anglo-Saxonism in the 19th century – Racial belief system
- Anti-Tom novels and Confederate literature
- Colonel (U.S. honorary title) and Category:People using the U.S. civilian title colonel
- Antebellum architecture – 19th-century Southern US architecture
- King Cotton – Slogan of the pre-Civil War American South
- Albion's Seed — claims English cavaliers to be key founders of Southern culture
