= 1857 United States Senate election in Massachusetts =

- January 9–13, 1857

Majority vote of each house needed to win
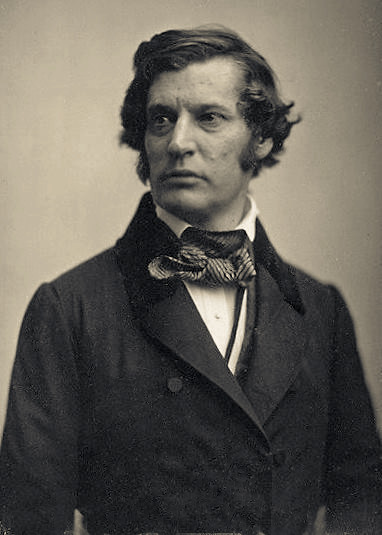
Nominee	Charles Sumner
Party	Republican
Senate	unanimous
Percentage	unanimous
House	333
Percentage	96.52%
Senator before election
Charles Sumner
Free Soil
Elected Senator
Charles Sumner
Republican

The 1857 United States Senate election in Massachusetts was held in January 1857. Incumbent Charles Sumner was re-elected to a second term in office as a member of the Republican Party. Sumner was elected in 1851 by a single vote after twenty-five inconclusive ballots by a coalition of Free-Soil and Democratic legislators. He had since become a founding member of the Massachusetts Republican Party.

At the time, Massachusetts elected United States senators by a majority vote of each separate house of the Massachusetts General Court: the House and the Senate.

During the election, Sumner was still recovering from a brutal attack by a fellow member of Congress, Preston Brooks. He would not permanently return to the Senate until 1859.

== Background ==
On May 22, 1856, Congressman Preston Brooks used a walking cane to attack incumbent Senator Charles Sumner on the floor of the Senate. Brooks considered his attack retaliation for a Sumner's speech given two days earlier, in which Sumner fiercely criticized slaveholders including South Carolina Senator Andrew Butler, author of the Kansas-Nebraska Act and Brook's relative. The beating nearly killed Sumner and contributed to the country's polarization over the issue of slavery.

In the 1856 legislative elections, supporters of the Republican ticket, including Republicans and nominal members of the Know-Nothing Party, won an overwhelming majority in both houses of the General Court, securing Sumner's re-election without opposition. Representatives-elect included 218 Republicans, 5 Fremont Americans, 6 Fillmore Americans, 4 Democrats, and 2 Whigs. 24 seats were left vacant.

== House ==
In a noted contrast from the divisive and lengthy 1851 election, Sumner was re-elected overwhelmingly by the House on January 9.

In the House, Sumner received votes from 333 of 345 voting. Some protest votes were cast for conservative former Whig politicians who had become independents or Democrats following the party's dissolution in 1856.

1857 Senate election in the House
Party	Candidate	Votes	%
Republican	Charles Sumner (incumbent)	333	96.52%
Independent	Robert C. Winthrop	3	0.87%
Unknown	Nathaniel J. Lord	1	0.29%
Independent	George H. Gordon	1	0.29%
Democratic	Erasmus D. Beach	1	0.29%
Unknown	Otis P. Lord	1	0.29%
Unknown	Charles E. Goodrich	1	0.29%
Independent	Edward Everett	1	0.29%
Democratic	Rufus Choate	1	0.29%
Constitutional Union	William Appleton	1	0.29%
Total votes		345	100.00%

== Senate ==
On January 13, the Senate re-elected Sumner unanimously.
