= Old Senate Chamber =

Room of the United States Capitol

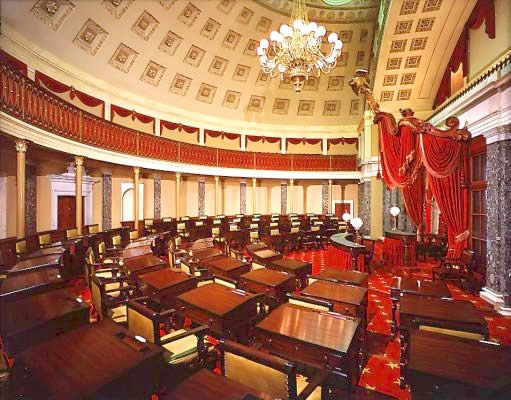
The restored Old Senate Chamber

The Old Senate Chamber is a room in the United States Capitol that was the legislative chamber of the United States Senate from 1810 to 1859 and served as the Supreme Court chamber from 1860 until 1935. It was designed in Neoclassical style and is elaborately decorated. In 1976 as part of the United States Bicentennial celebrations, it was restored to the appearance of when it served the Senate in the 1850s; it is preserved as a museum and for the Senate's use.

== Design and furnishings ==
Located north of the Capitol rotunda on the second floor of the north wing (the Senate side) of the Capitol, the semicircular two-story room is 50 feet (15 m) wide and 75 feet (23 m) long, with a half-domed ceiling.

The chamber is overlooked by two visitors' galleries. The gallery on the east is "supported by eight Ionic columns of variegated marble quarried along the Potomac River", inspired by the Erechtheum of the Acropolis of Athens. Directly above this gallery hangs an 1823 "porthole portrait" of George Washington by Rembrandt Peale, which was purchased for display in the chamber in 1832 upon the centennial of Washington's birth.

The second gallery is the Ladies' Gallery, which follows the curved western wall and is much larger. The Ladies' Gallery is supported by 12 steel columns "encased in cast-iron forms with Corinthian capitals, which were designed to simulate the cast-iron originals." The gallery has a "wrought-iron balcony railing [that] follows the contour of the gallery and is backed by crimson fabric that accentuates the decorative metalwork."

On the dais in the center of the room is a curved table with "richly turned and carved legs and a crimson modesty screen" which serves as the desk of the president of the Senate (the vice president of the United States). The crimson fabric is hung from a mahogany valence from a canopy overhead. The valence is below a carved gilt eagle and shield. Directly in front of the vice president's desk one tier down is "a larger desk of similar design," which was used by the secretary of the Senate and chief clerk.

A glass screen between the dais and a small lobby allowed senators to relax but remain within earshot of the floor. In addition, there are two fireplace mantels on the east wall behind the screen, which are among the original pieces of the chamber that remain today. Two other mantels on the lobby's north and south ends are replicas, as the originals were replaced with stoves when the chamber was converted for the use of the Supreme Court of the United States.

Radiating off the dais are desks and chairs for 64 senators, which was the number of senators at the time the Senate moved to its current quarters. The desks and chairs are located on four semicircular graduated platforms. When the Senate moved to its current chamber in 1859, it took the original furniture with it. Many of the original desks remain in use today, including the Daniel Webster and Jefferson Davis desks. The desks and chairs that are in the chamber today are replicas reproduced from a circa 1819 design by the New York City cabinetmaker Thomas Constantine. Like the originals, the furniture is mahogany.

Behind the last row of desks is a low paneled wall separating the center of the chamber from a visitors' area (the third visitor area in the chamber, along with the two visitors' galleries). The area has red-upholstered sofas and was originally "reserved for privileged visitors who gained admittance to the Chamber through the special invitation of a senator." On either side of the main doorway are niches for coal- or wood-burning stoves; the current stoves are reproductions.

The color scheme of crimson and gold, seen in the dais' decorations, can be seen elsewhere in the chamber as well, as in the "crimson drapery swags secured with gilt stars" in the visitors' galleries, crimson window treatments, and the carpet on the chamber floor, which is woven from long-staple virgin wool and has a "gold star pattern on a red background".

The domed ceiling of the chamber is painted white. The Architect of the Capitol describes it as "elaborately coffered and enriched by decorative moldings." In the center of the ceiling is a semicircular skylight, and around it are five smaller circular skylights. The skylight originally allowed natural light in the chamber, but today they are artificially lit. A large brass chandelier made by Philadelphia's Cornelius and Company also provided light; a reproduction now hangs above the vice president's desk.

== Use by the Senate and Supreme Court ==
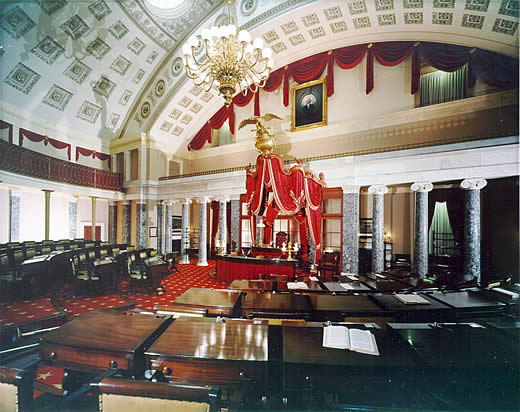
View of Chamber from southwest

The chamber was completed in 1810, after Architect of the Capitol Benjamin Henry Latrobe divided the original Senate chamber in the North wing into two rooms, one on the first floor and the other on the second. The bottom-floor chamber—known as the Old Supreme Court Chamber—was put into use as a chamber for the Supreme Court in 1810.

In 1810—the same year the Supreme Court moved into the lower floor—the Senate moved into the second-story chamber. For the next 49 years, the Senate used the chamber until the completion of the north wing extension in 1859, when they moved to their present-day chamber. At its height, 64 senators met in the chamber. In 1860, after the Senate moved to its current quarters, the Supreme Court moved upstairs into Old Senate Chamber, where it sat until the completion of the United States Supreme Court building in 1935.

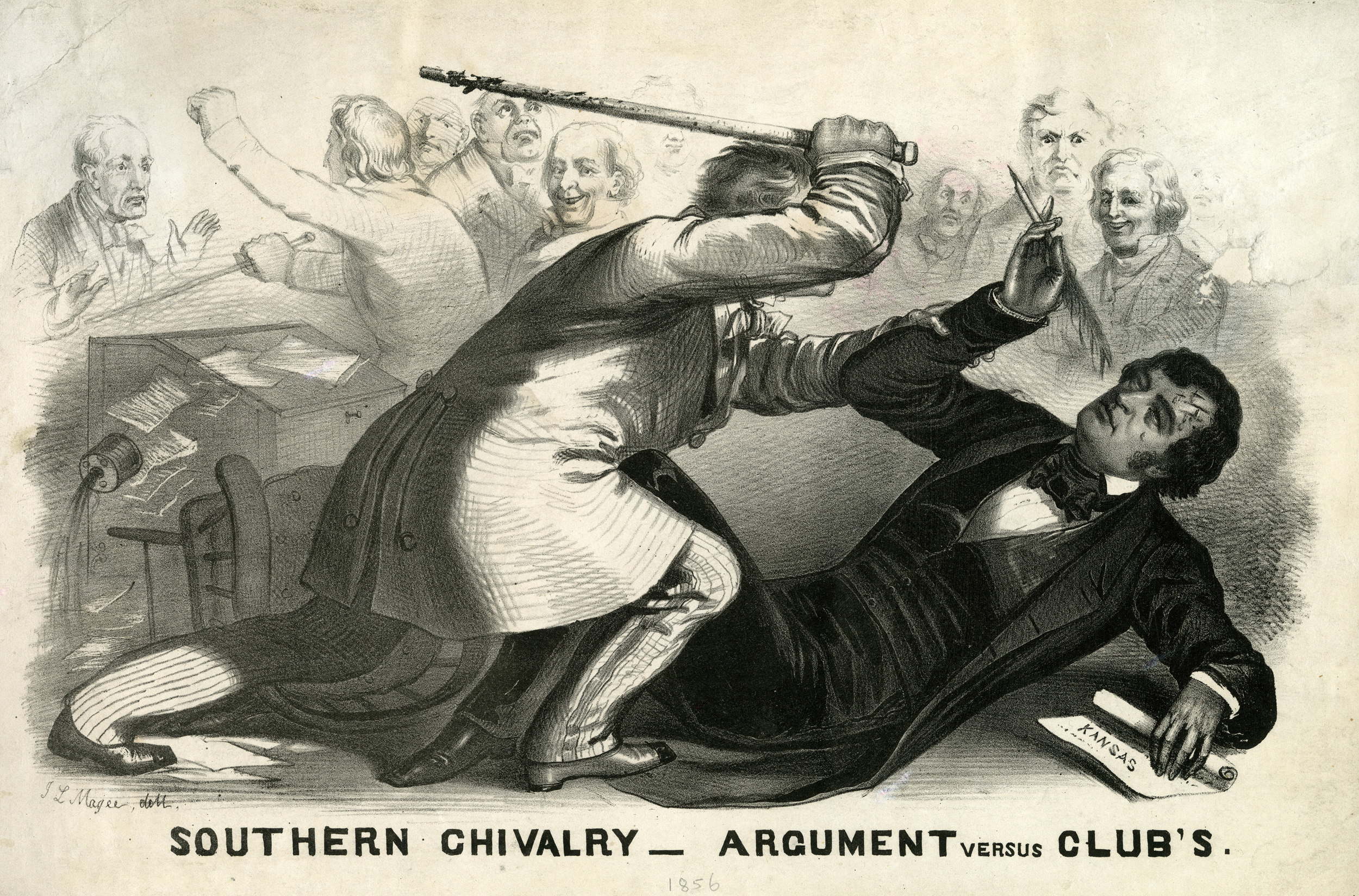
Famous political cartoon of Brooks' attack on Sumner by J.L. Magee

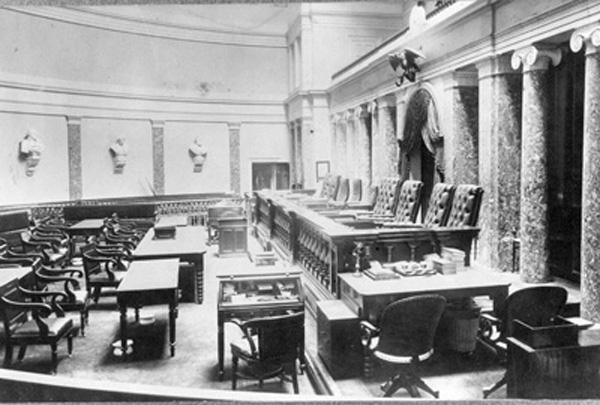
The Old Senate Chamber was reconfigured for use by the Supreme Court between 1860 and 1935.

Many noted events occurred in the chamber. Among them are the passage of the 1820 Missouri Compromise, the 1830 Webster–Hayne debate, and the Webster-Clay-Calhoun debates over the Compromise of 1850. In 1856, Representative Preston Brooks beat Senator Charles Sumner nearly to death with a cane in the chamber. The attack occurred three days after Sumner, a strident abolitionist, attacked pro-slavery politicians, including Brooks' relative Senator Andrew Butler, in a speech. Brooks attacked Sumner as a matter of honor, beating him with a cane and injuring him so badly that he was absent from the Senate for nearly three years as he recovered.

In a famous exchange in 1858, Senator James Henry Hammond of South Carolina gave a speech advancing the Mudsill theory, arguing that slavery was justified because civilization required a permanent underclass to serve as a foundation. In reply, Senator David C. Broderick, a Free Soil Democrat, pointed out that he himself had risen to the Senate from this "mudsill" class, and that his father, an Irish immigrant, had worked as a stonecutter in the construction of that very room:

If I were inclined to forget my connection with them, or to deny that I sprang from them, this chamber would not be the place in which I could do either. While I hold a seat I have but to look at the beautiful capitals adorning the pilasters that support this roof, to be reminded of my father's talent and to see his handiwork.

Until 1976, the room was used for meetings, irregular congressional committee hearings, and as temporary quarters while the modern Senate chamber was being repaired in 1940, 1949, and 1950.

== Restoration ==
The United States Bicentennial brought about the decision to restore the room to its antebellum appearance. At present, much of the room is furnished with reproductions with the exceptions of the gilded eagle ornament located above the chair of the president of the Senate (the vice president of the United States), which is original, and above the eagle ornament on a third-story gallery resides an original portrait of George Washington by Rembrandt Peale.

After the September 11 attacks in 2001, the chamber was closed to tourists for almost two years due to security concerns; tour groups would have to pass close to the current Senate chamber and the office of then-Senate Majority Leader Bill Frist. It was later reopened after tightened security measures were put into place, with visitors being observed by two Capitol Police officers posted outside the room and allowed to "quickly file through the room" only when the Senate is not in session (usually Monday mornings and Friday afternoons).

== Modern use ==
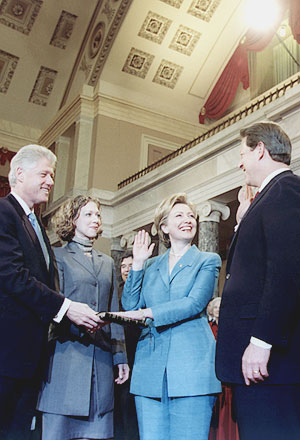
A mock Senate swearing-in ceremony for Hillary Clinton is held in the Old Senate Chamber in January 2001

The chamber is today used occasionally for ceremonial functions. Special meetings between senators or dignitaries as well as speeches have been given there. Examples of such events include a speech by Walter Mondale in the Old Senate Chamber in September 2002, a meeting between Jesse Helms and visiting members of the United Nations Security Council in March 2000, and a speech by former Senate Majority Leader Mike Mansfield to senators and guests in March 1998.

The room has been used by the press to take photos of senators taking a mock oath of office. Senators are normally sworn in in the current Senate chamber, where no photos are allowed. However, Byron Dorgan, who was elected in a special election, was sworn in as a senator in 1992 in a ceremony in the Old Senate Chamber.

The chamber is rarely used for official purposes. One exception is special circumstances calling for a more collegial atmosphere. The Senate met in the chamber on the morning of January 8, 1999 to deliberate rules for the impeachment trial of President Clinton; the procedures for the trial, brokered by Phil Gramm and Ted Kennedy, passed 100–0. In 2007, newly elected Senate Majority Leader Harry Reid called a bipartisan session in the Chamber in what was called a "private moment of bonding." In 2013, the Senate met in the Old Chamber to discuss changes to the rules of Senate filibusters. In September 2023, in the context of the Russian invasion of Ukraine, senators met with Ukrainian President Volodymyr Zelenskyy in the Old Chamber.

== See also ==
- National Statuary Hall (Old House Chamber)
