= Preston Brooks =

American politician (1819–1857)

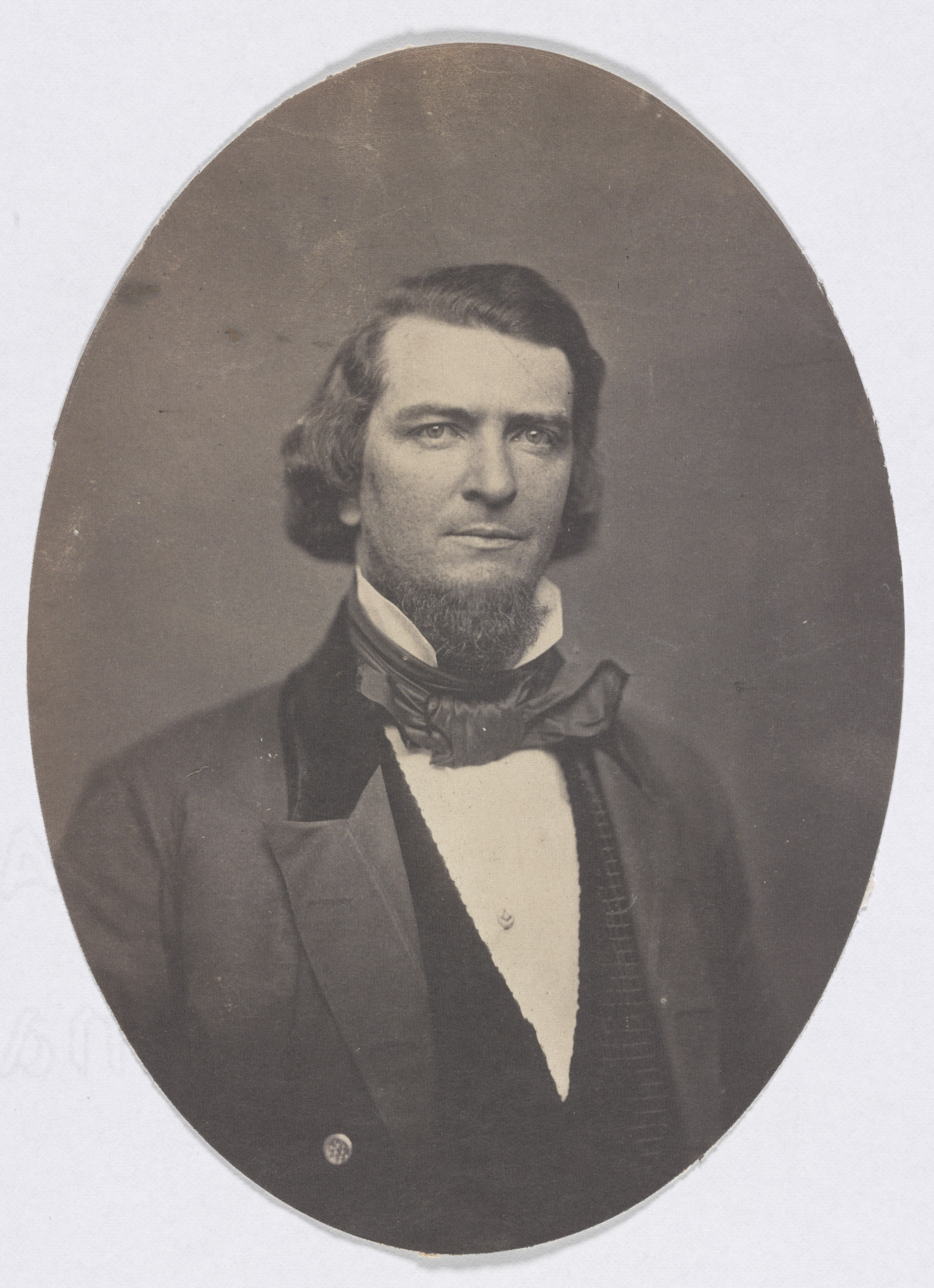
- Brooks in 1856

Member of the U.S. House of Representatives from South Carolina's 4th district
- In office August 1, 1856 – January 27, 1857
- Preceded by: Himself
- Succeeded by: Milledge Bonham
- In office March 4, 1853 – July 15, 1856
- Preceded by: John McQueen
- Succeeded by: Himself

Member of the South Carolina House of Representatives from the Edgefield County district
- In office November 25, 1844 – December 15, 1845

Personal details
- Born: Preston Smith Brooks; August 5, 1819 Edgefield County, South Carolina, U.S.
- Died: January 27, 1857 (aged 37) Washington, D.C., U.S.
- Party: Democratic
- Education: University of South Carolina

Military service
- Allegiance: United States
- Branch/service: United States Army
- Years of service: 1846–1848
- Rank: Colonel
- Commands: Palmetto Regiment
- Battles/wars: Mexican–American War; Battle of Chapultepec

Preston Smith Brooks (August 5, 1819 – January 27, 1857) was an American slaveholder, politician, and member of the U.S. House of Representatives from South Carolina, serving as a member of the Democratic Party from 1853 until his resignation in July 1856 and again from August 1856 until his death.

He is most remembered for his May 22, 1856, attack upon abolitionist and Republican Senator Charles Sumner, whom he beat nearly to death with a cane on the floor of the United States Senate in retaliation for an anti-slavery speech in which Sumner verbally insulted Brooks's first cousin once removed, South Carolina Senator Andrew Butler.

Brooks' beating seriously injured Sumner, who was unable to return to the Senate for three years. The Massachusetts Legislature reelected Sumner in 1856 "and let his seat sit vacant during his absence as a reminder of Southern brutality".

An attempt to oust Brooks from the House of Representatives failed, and he received only token punishment in his criminal trial. He resigned his seat in July 1856 to allow his constituents to express their view on his conduct; they reelected him in the August special election to fill the vacancy created by his resignation. He was reelected to a full term in November 1856, but died in January 1857, five weeks before the new term began in March.

As described by historian Stephen Puleo, "The caning had an enormous impact on the events that followed over the next four years. ... As a result of the caning, the country was pushed, inexorably and unstoppably, to civil war."

== Early life ==
Brooks was born in Edgefield County, South Carolina, on August 5, 1819, the son of Whitfield Brooks and Mary Parsons Carroll Brooks. Of English descent, his great-great-grandfather John Brooks was the first in the Brooks family present in the Americas, settling in the Province of North Carolina from England around the early 18th century.

He attended South Carolina College (now known as the University of South Carolina) but was expelled just before graduation for threatening local police officers with firearms. After leaving college, he studied law, attained admission to the bar, and practiced in Edgefield.

In addition to practicing law, Brooks owned a plantation located in Cambridge, between Edgefield and Ninety-Six. In 1840, Brooks fought a duel with future Texas Senator Louis T. Wigfall and was shot in the hip, forcing him to use a walking cane for the rest of his life. He was admitted to the Bar in 1845. Brooks served in the Mexican–American War as Captain of Company D of the Palmetto Regiment. South Carolina in the Mexican War notes the service of both Brooks and 4th Corporal Carey Wentworth Styles (who later founded The Atlanta Constitution) in Co. D, the "Old 96 Boys" of the Edgefield District.

== Family ==
Brooks' first wife was Caroline Harper Means (1820–1843). They had one child, Whitfield D. Brooks, who was born in 1843 and died that same year. Brooks was widowed upon Caroline's death.

His second wife was Martha Caroline Means (1826–1901), his first wife's cousin. They had three children, Caroline Harper Brooks (1849–1924), Rosa Brooks (1849–1933), and Preston Smith Brooks (1854–1928). Martha outlived her husband.

== Political career ==
Brooks was a member of the South Carolina House of Representatives in 1844. Brooks was elected to the 33rd United States Congress in 1853 as a Democrat. Like his fellow South Carolina Representatives and Senators, Brooks took an extreme pro-slavery position, asserting that the enslavement of Black people by whites was right and proper, that any attack or restriction on slavery was an attack on the rights and the social structure of the South.

During Brooks' service as representative, there was great controversy over slavery in the Kansas Territory and whether Kansas would be admitted as a free or slavery state. He supported actions by pro-slavery men from Missouri to make Kansas a slave territory. In March 1856, Brooks wrote: "The fate of the South is to be decided with the Kansas issue. If Kansas becomes a hireling [i.e., free] state, slave property will decline to half its present value in Missouri ... [and] abolitionism will become the prevailing sentiment. So with Arkansas; so with upper Texas."

== Sumner assault ==
On May 20, 1856, Senator Charles Sumner made a speech denouncing "The Crime Against Kansas" and the Southern leaders whom he regarded as complicit, including Brooks's first cousin once removed, Senator Andrew Butler. Sumner compared Butler with Don Quixote for embracing a prostitute (slavery) as his mistress, saying Butler "believes himself a chivalrous knight".

Of course he has chosen a mistress to whom he has made his vows, and who, though ugly to others, is always lovely to him; though polluted in the sight of the world, is chaste in his sight. I mean the harlot Slavery.

Senator Stephen Douglas of Illinois, who was also a subject of criticism during the speech, suggested to a colleague while Sumner was orating that "this damn fool [Sumner] is going to get himself shot by some other damn fool."

Sumner's language was intentionally inflammatory; Southerners often claimed that abolition would lead to intermarriage, arguing that abolitionists opposed slavery because they wanted to have sex with and marry black women. Abolitionists reversed the argument by accusing Southerners of supporting slavery so they could make sexual use of slave women. As Hoffer (2010) says, "It is also important to note the sexual imagery that recurred throughout the oration, which was neither accidental nor without precedent. Abolitionists routinely accused slaveholders of maintaining slavery so that they could engage in forcible sexual relations with their slaves."

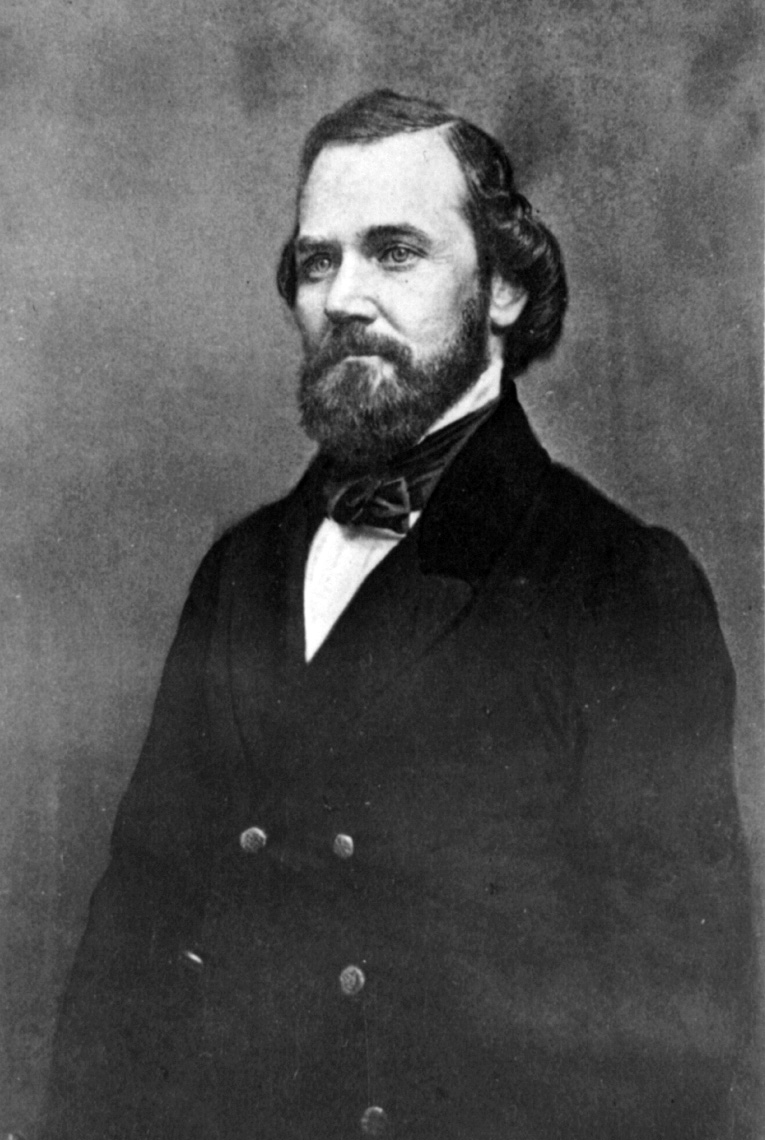
Laurence M. Keitt

Brooks thought of challenging Sumner to a duel. He consulted with Representative Laurence M. Keitt (also a South Carolina Democrat) on dueling etiquette. Keitt said that dueling was for gentlemen of equal social standing. In his view, Sumner was no gentleman, no better than a drunkard due to his supposedly coarse and insulting language toward Butler. Brooks then decided to "punish" Sumner with a public beating.

On May 22, two days after Sumner's speech, Brooks entered the Senate chamber in company with Keitt. Also with him was Representative Henry A. Edmundson (Democrat-Virginia), a personal friend with his own history of legislative violence. In May 1854, Edmundson had been arrested by the House Sergeant at Arms after attempting to attack Representative Lewis D. Campbell of Ohio during a tense debate on the House floor.

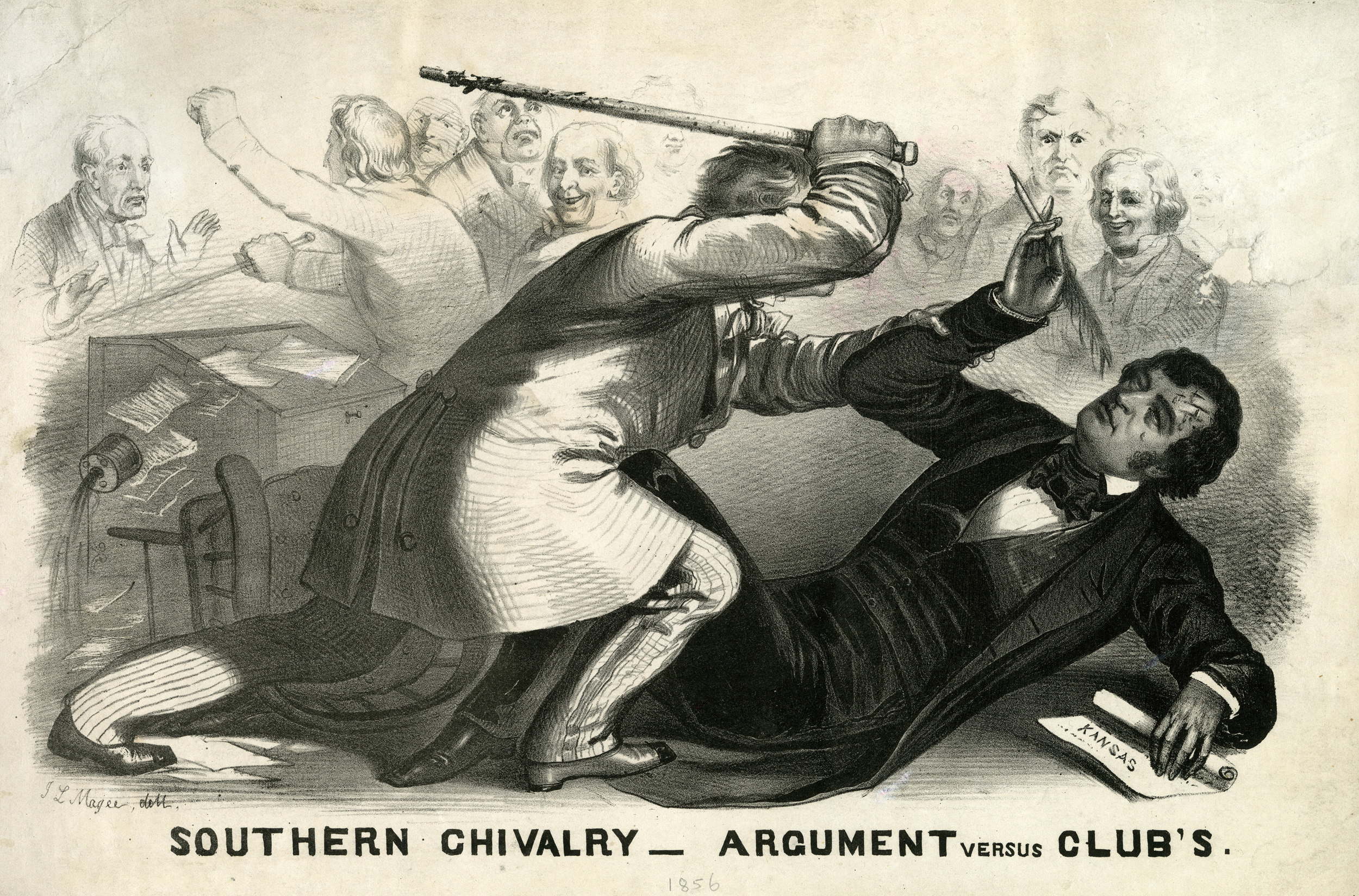
J.L. Magee's famous political cartoon of the attack on Sumner

Brooks confronted Sumner, who was seated at his desk, writing letters. He said, "Mr. Sumner, I have read your speech twice over carefully. It is a libel on South Carolina, and Mr. Butler, who is a relative of mine." As Sumner began to stand up, Brooks hit Sumner over the head several times with his cane, made of thick gutta-percha with a gold head. Sumner was trapped under the heavy desk (which was bolted to the floor), but Brooks continued to strike Sumner until Sumner wrenched the desk from the floor in an attempt to escape. By this time, Sumner was blinded by his own blood. He staggered up the aisle and collapsed unconscious. Senator John J. Crittenden, Representative Ambrose Murray (R-NY), and others attempted to restrain Brooks before he killed Sumner but were blocked by Keitt, who brandished a pistol and shouted at the onlookers to leave Brooks and Sumner alone. Brooks continued beating Sumner until the cane broke, then quietly left the chamber with Keitt and Edmundson. Brooks required medical attention before leaving the Capitol, because he had hit himself above his right eye with one of his backswings.

Sumner suffered head trauma that would cause him chronic pain and symptoms consistent with what would now be called traumatic brain injury and post-traumatic stress disorder, and spent three years convalescing before returning to his Senate seat. He suffered chronic pain and debilitation for the rest of his life.

== After the attack ==
The national reaction to Brooks' attack was sharply divided along regional lines. In Congress, members in both houses armed themselves when they ventured onto the floor. Brooks never apologized for the attack. In his speech to the House of Representatives announcing his resignation on July 14, 1856, Brooks insisted that he had behaved honorably and condemned any efforts to censure or punish him for his behavior. Brooks was widely cheered across the South, where his attack on Sumner was considered legitimate and socially justifiable. South Carolinians sent Brooks dozens of new canes, with one bearing the phrase, "Good job"; another cane was inscribed "Hit him again." The Richmond Enquirer wrote: "We consider the act good in conception, better in execution, and best of all in consequences. These vulgar abolitionists in the Senate must be lashed into submission." The University of Virginia's Jefferson Literary and Debating Society sent a new gold-headed cane to replace Brooks' broken one. Southern lawmakers made rings out of the original cane's remains, which they wore on neck chains to show their solidarity with Brooks.

In contrast, Northerners, even those previously opposed to Sumner's extreme abolitionist invective, were universally shocked by Brooks' violence. Anti-slavery men cited it as evidence that the South had lost interest in national debate, and now relied on violence to express themselves. John L. Magee's political cartoon famously expressed the general Northern sentiment that the South's vaunted chivalry had degenerated into "Argument versus Clubs".

American Party Congressman Anson Burlingame publicly humiliated Brooks in retaliation by goading Brooks into challenging him to a duel, accepting, and then watching Brooks back out. After Burlingame made provocative remarks, Brooks challenged Burlingame, stating he would gladly face him in any "Yankee mudsill" of his choosing. Burlingame, a well-known marksman, eagerly accepted, choosing rifles as the weapons and the Navy Yards in the border town of Niagara Falls, Canada, as the location to circumvent the U.S. ban on dueling. Brooks, reportedly dismayed by both Burlingame's enthusiastic acceptance and reputation as a crack shot, backed out by citing unspecified risks to his safety if he was to cross "hostile country" (the Northern states) to reach Canada.

Brooks claimed that he "meant no disrespect to the Senate of the United States" by attacking Sumner, and also that he had not intended to kill Sumner, or else he would have used a different weapon. Brooks was tried in a District of Columbia court for the attack. He was convicted of assault and was fined $300, though he was not incarcerated.

A motion to expel Brooks from the House failed, but he resigned on July 15 to allow his constituents to ratify or condemn his conduct. They approved, returning him to office in the special election held on August 1 and then electing him to a new term in November 1856.

== Death ==
Brooks died unexpectedly from a violent attack of croup on January 27, 1857, a few weeks before the March 4 start of the new congressional term to which he had been elected. He was buried in Edgefield, South Carolina. The official telegram announcing his death stated "He died a horrid death, and suffered intensely. He endeavored to tear his own throat open to get breath." Despite terrible weather, thousands went to the Capitol to attend memorial services. After his body was transported back to Edgefield, another large crowd took part in funeral ceremonies before he was buried.

== Legacy ==
The city of Brooksville, Florida (created from the merger of the towns of Melendez and Pierceville), and Brooks County, Georgia, are named after Brooks, as was present-day Big Bend, West Virginia, which was previously known as Brooksville, Virginia. All were named shortly after his caning of Sumner.

== In popular culture ==
Preston Brooks was portrayed by Johnny Knoxville in the 2014 "Charleston" episode of the TV series Drunk History. Patton Oswalt played Charles Sumner, and Seth Weitberg told the story.

== See also ==
- List of federal political scandals in the United States
- List of members of the United States Congress who died in office (1790–1899)

== Notes ==
U.S. House of Representatives
Preceded by John McQueen	Member of the U.S. House of Representatives from South Carolina's 4th congressional district 1853–1856	Succeeded by Himself
Preceded by Himself	Member of the U.S. House of Representatives from South Carolina's 4th congressional district 1856–1857	Succeeded by Milledge Bonham
