= Caning of Charles Sumner =

Attack of US Senator by a Representative in 1856

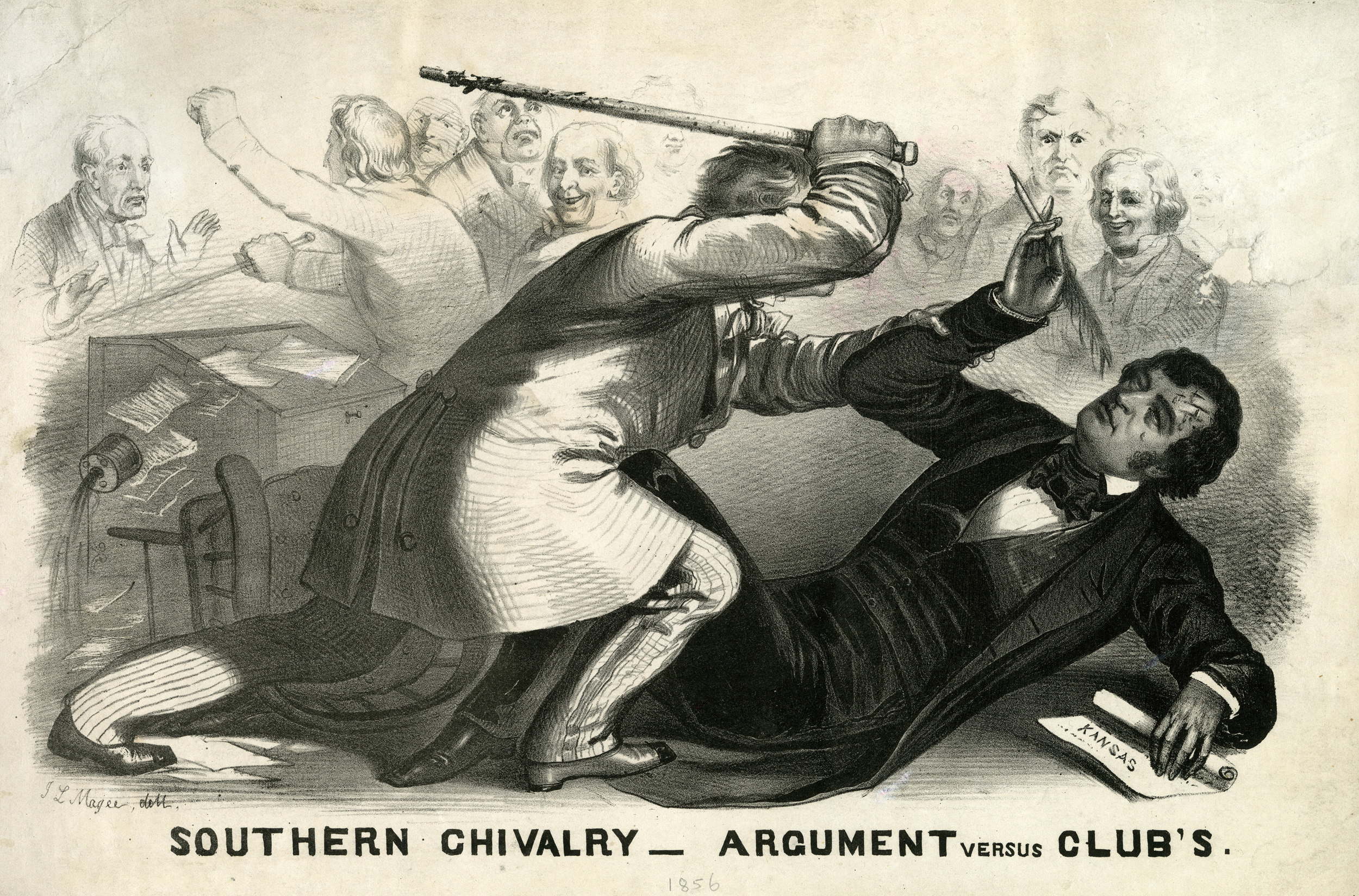
- Political caricature of the caning, depicting Sumner on the floor holding a pen and his "Crime against Kansas" speech as Brooks lunges at him
- Location: Old Senate Chamber, United States Capitol, Washington, D.C.
- Date: May 22, 1856; 170 years ago
- Target: Charles Sumner
- Attack type: Assault by caning
- Perpetrator: Preston Smith Brooks
- Motive: Retaliation to an anti-slavery speech by Sumner
- Verdict: Guilty
- Convictions: Assault
- Sentence: Brooks fined $300 ($10,750 in today's dollars)

The caning of Charles Sumner, or the Brooks–Sumner Affair, occurred on May 22, 1856, in the United States Senate chamber, when Representative Preston Brooks, a pro-slavery Democrat from South Carolina, used a walking cane to beat Senator Charles Sumner, an abolitionist Republican from Massachusetts, nearly to death. Although Sumner was unable to return to the Senate until December 1859, the Massachusetts legislature refused to replace him, leaving his empty desk in the Senate as a public reminder of the attack.

Brooks' violence was in retaliation for an invective-laden speech given by Sumner two days earlier in which he fiercely criticized slaveholders, including pro-slavery South Carolina Senator Andrew Butler, a relative of Brooks. The event contributed significantly to the country's polarization over the issue of slavery. It is considered symbolic of the "breakdown of reasoned discourse" and willingness to resort to violence that led to the American Civil War.

== Background ==
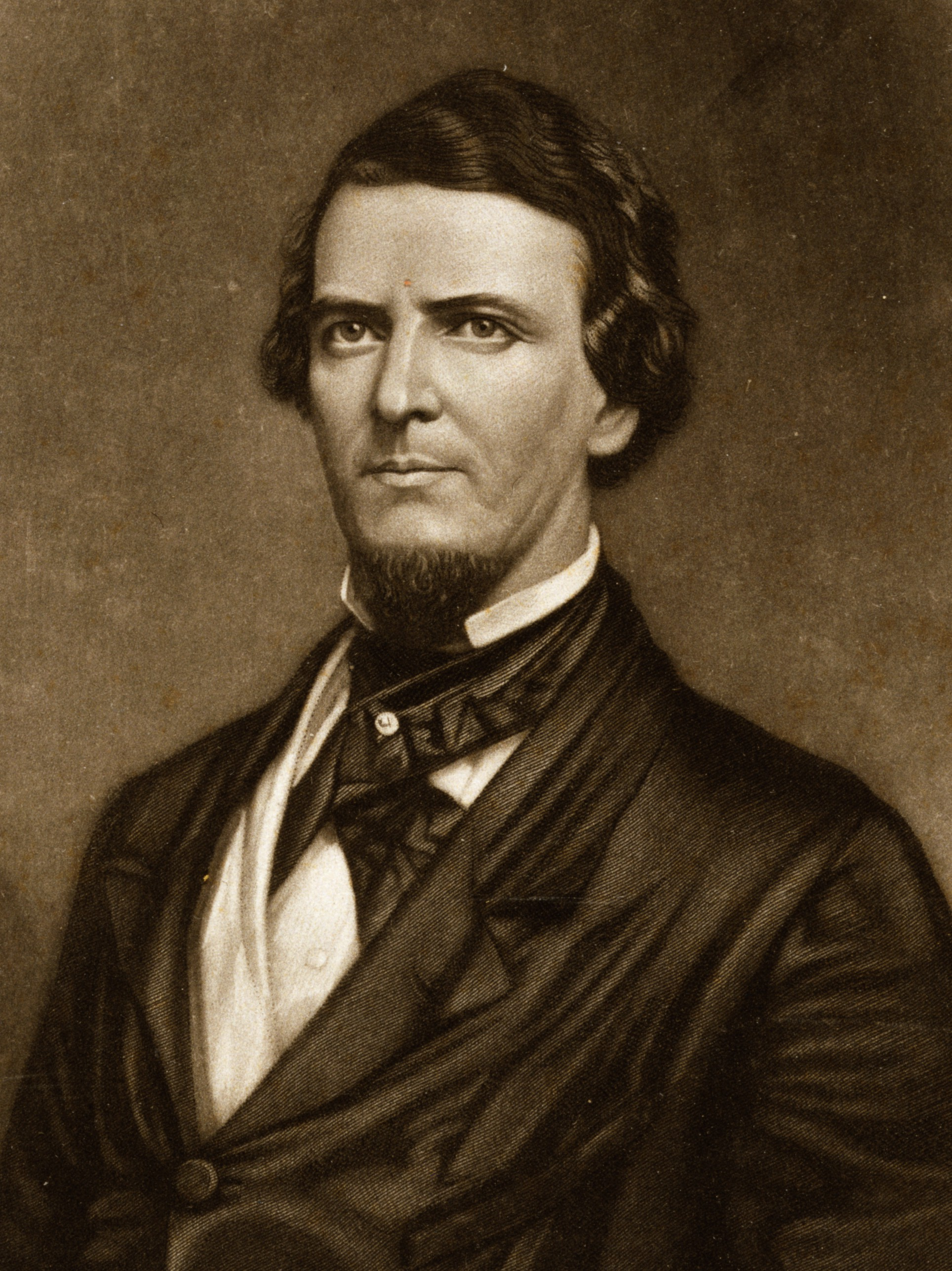
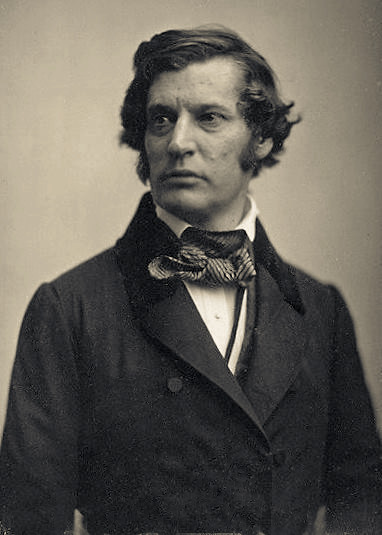
Representative Preston Brooks (left) and Senator Charles Sumner (right)

In 1856, during the "Bleeding Kansas" crisis, Senator Charles Sumner denounced the Kansas–Nebraska Act in his "Crime against Kansas" speech, delivered on May 19 and May 20. The long speech argued for the immediate admission of Kansas as a free state and went on to denounce the "Slave Power"—the slave owners and their political power:

Not in any common lust for power did this uncommon tragedy have its origin. It is the rape of a virgin Territory, compelling it to the hateful embrace of slavery; and it may be clearly traced to a depraved desire for a new Slave State, hideous offspring of such a crime, in the hope of adding to the power of slavery in the National Government.

Sumner's rhetoric was largely directed at the authors of the Act, Senators Stephen A. Douglas of Illinois and Andrew Butler of South Carolina. Regarding Butler, Sumner said:

The senator from South Carolina has read many books of chivalry, and believes himself a chivalrous knight with sentiments of honor and courage. Of course he has chosen a mistress to whom he has made his vows, and who, though ugly to others, is always lovely to him; though polluted in the sight of the world, is chaste in his sight—I mean the harlot, Slavery. For her, his tongue is always profuse in words. Let her be impeached in character, or any proposition made to shut her out from the extension of her wantonness, and no extravagance of manner or hardihood of assertion is then too great for this senator. The frenzy of Don Quixote, in behalf of his wench, Dulcinea del Toboso, is all surpassed.

Sumner also mocked Butler's speaking ability, which had been impeded by a recent stroke:

[He] touches nothing which he does not disfigure with error, sometimes of principle, sometimes of fact. He cannot open his mouth, but out there flies a blunder.

Sumner had been ridiculed and insulted by both Douglas and Butler for his opposition to the Fugitive Slave Law and the Kansas-Nebraska Act, with Butler crudely race-baiting Sumner by making sexual allusions to black women, like many slaveholders who accused abolitionists of promoting interracial marriage.

Sumner's reference to slavery as Butler's "mistress" sought to highlight the sexual depravity of the institution — and possibly of Butler himself. An interview with a man who had been enslaved by Butler, uncovered decades later by the historian Zaakir Tameez, suggests Butler fathered two children with a mistress, likely a slave.

Sexually charged accusations had often been part of the abolitionist lexicon. Williamjames Hoffer states that "It is also important to note the sexual imagery that recurred throughout [Sumner's] oration, which was neither accidental nor without precedent. Abolitionists routinely accused slaveholders of maintaining slavery so that they could engage in forcible sexual relations with their slaves." Douglas said during the speech "[T]his damn fool is going to get himself killed by some other damn fool".

Beyond criticizing Douglas and Butler, Sumner denounced his former Senate colleague David Atchison, who had violently seized polling locations to manipulate the territorial elections in Kansas, comparing him to Catiline, the soldier and politician who famously led a failed coup attempt against the Roman state. Maintaining the analogy, Sumner presented himself as a modern Cicero, saving the American republic from anti-democratic conspirators.

Representative Preston Brooks, Butler's first cousin once removed, was infuriated. He later said that he intended to challenge Sumner to a duel, and consulted fellow South Carolina Representative Laurence M. Keitt on dueling etiquette. Keitt told him that dueling was for gentlemen of equal social standing, and that Sumner was no better than a drunkard, because of the supposedly coarse language he had used during his speech. Brooks said that he concluded that, since Sumner was no gentleman, he did not merit honorable treatment; to Keitt and Brooks, it was more appropriate to humiliate Sumner by beating him with a cane in a public setting.

== Day of the attack ==
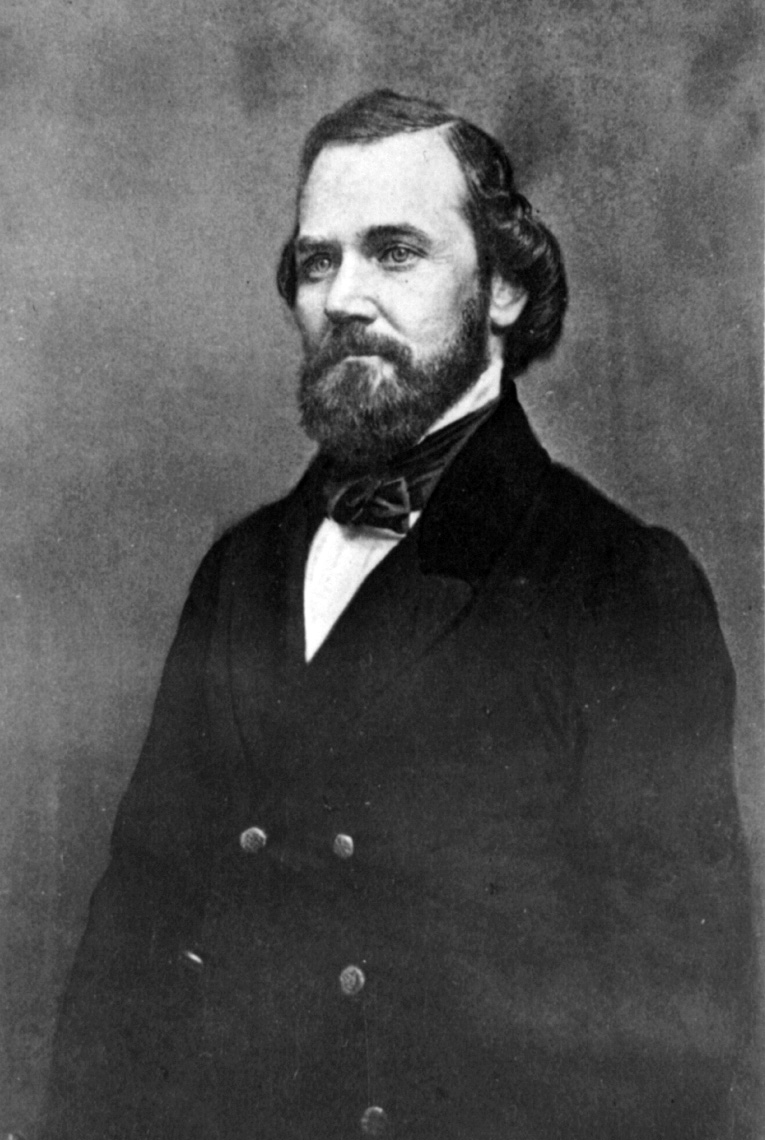
Representative Laurence M. Keitt advised Brooks and was with him when he assaulted Sumner

Two days later, on the afternoon of May 22, 1856, Brooks entered the Senate chamber with Keitt and another ally, Representative Henry A. Edmundson of Virginia. They waited for the galleries to clear, being particularly concerned that there be no ladies present to witness what Brooks intended to do. He confronted Sumner as he sat writing at his desk in the almost empty chamber. "Mr. Sumner, I have read your speech twice over carefully. It is a libel on South Carolina, and Mr. Butler, who is a relative of mine", Brooks calmly announced in a low voice. As Sumner began to stand up, Brooks beat Sumner severely on the head before he could reach his feet, using a thick gutta-percha cane with a gold head. The force of the blows so shocked Sumner that he lost his sight immediately. "I no longer saw my assailant, nor any other person or object in the room. What I did afterwards was done almost unconsciously, acting under the instincts of self-defense", he recalled later.

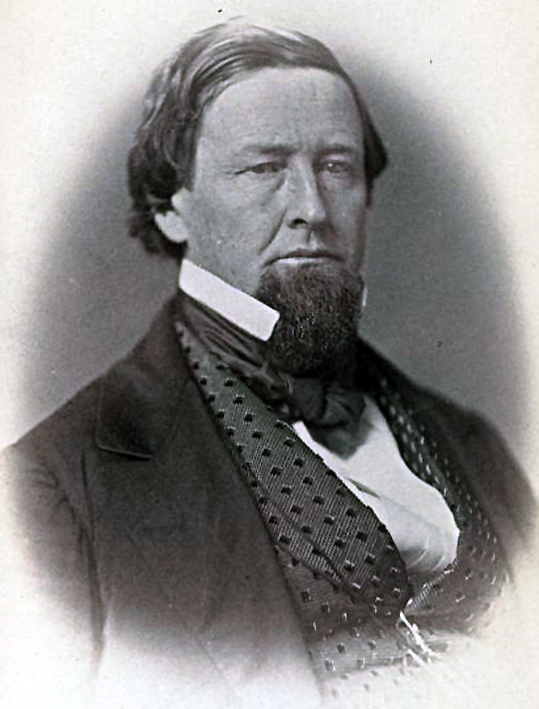
Representative Henry A. Edmundson also advised Brooks and was with him during the assault on Sumner

Sumner was knocked down and trapped under the heavy desk that was bolted to the floor. His chair, which was pulled up to his desk, moved back and forth on a track; Sumner either could not or did not think to slide his chair back to escape, so it pinned him under his desk. Brooks continued to strike Sumner until Sumner rose to his feet and ripped the desk from the floor in an effort to get away from Brooks. By this time, Sumner was blinded by his own blood. He staggered up the aisle and, arms outstretched, vainly attempted to defend himself, but that made him an even larger and easier target for Brooks, who continued to beat him across the head, face, and shoulders "to the full extent of [my] power". Brooks did not stop when his cane snapped; he continued thrashing Sumner with the piece that held the gold head. Sumner stumbled and reeled convulsively, "Oh Lord," he gasped, "Oh! Oh!" Near the end of the attack, Sumner collapsed unconscious, although shortly before he succumbed, he "bellowed like a calf" according to Brooks. Brooks grabbed the falling Sumner, held him up by the lapel with one hand, and continued to lash out at him with the cane in the other. Several other Senators and Representatives attempted to help Sumner, but were blocked by Edmundson, who yelled at the spectators to leave Brooks and Sumner alone, and Keitt, who brandished his own cane and a pistol, and shouted, "Let them be!" and "Let them alone, God damn you, let them alone!"

Senator John J. Crittenden attempted to intervene, and pleaded with Brooks not to kill Sumner. Senator Robert Toombs then interceded for Crittenden, telling Keitt not to attack someone who was not a party to the dispute, though Toombs also indicated later that he had no issue with Brooks beating Sumner, and in fact approved of it.

Representatives Ambrose S. Murray and Edwin B. Morgan were finally able to intervene and restrain Brooks, at which point he quietly left the chamber. Murray obtained the aid of a Senate page and the Sergeant at Arms, Dunning R. McNair. As Sumner regained consciousness they were able to assist him to walk to a cloakroom. Sumner received first aid and medical attention, including several stitches. With the aid of Nathaniel P. Banks—the Speaker of the House—and Senator Henry Wilson, Sumner was able to travel by carriage to his lodgings, where he received further medical treatment. Brooks also required medical attention before leaving the Capitol; he had hit himself above his right eye with one of his backswings.

The cane Brooks used was broken into several pieces, which he left on the blood-soaked floor of the Senate chamber. Some, including the cane's gold head, were recovered by Edmundson, who gave the portion with the head to Adam John Glossbrenner, the House Sergeant at Arms. This portion of the cane eventually ended up at the Old State House Museum in Boston; it was worked to smooth the edges and finish, and then put on display. Southern lawmakers made rings out of the other pieces Edmundson recovered from the Senate floor, which they wore on neck chains to show their solidarity with Brooks, who boasted "[The pieces of my cane] are begged for as sacred relics."

== Aftermath ==
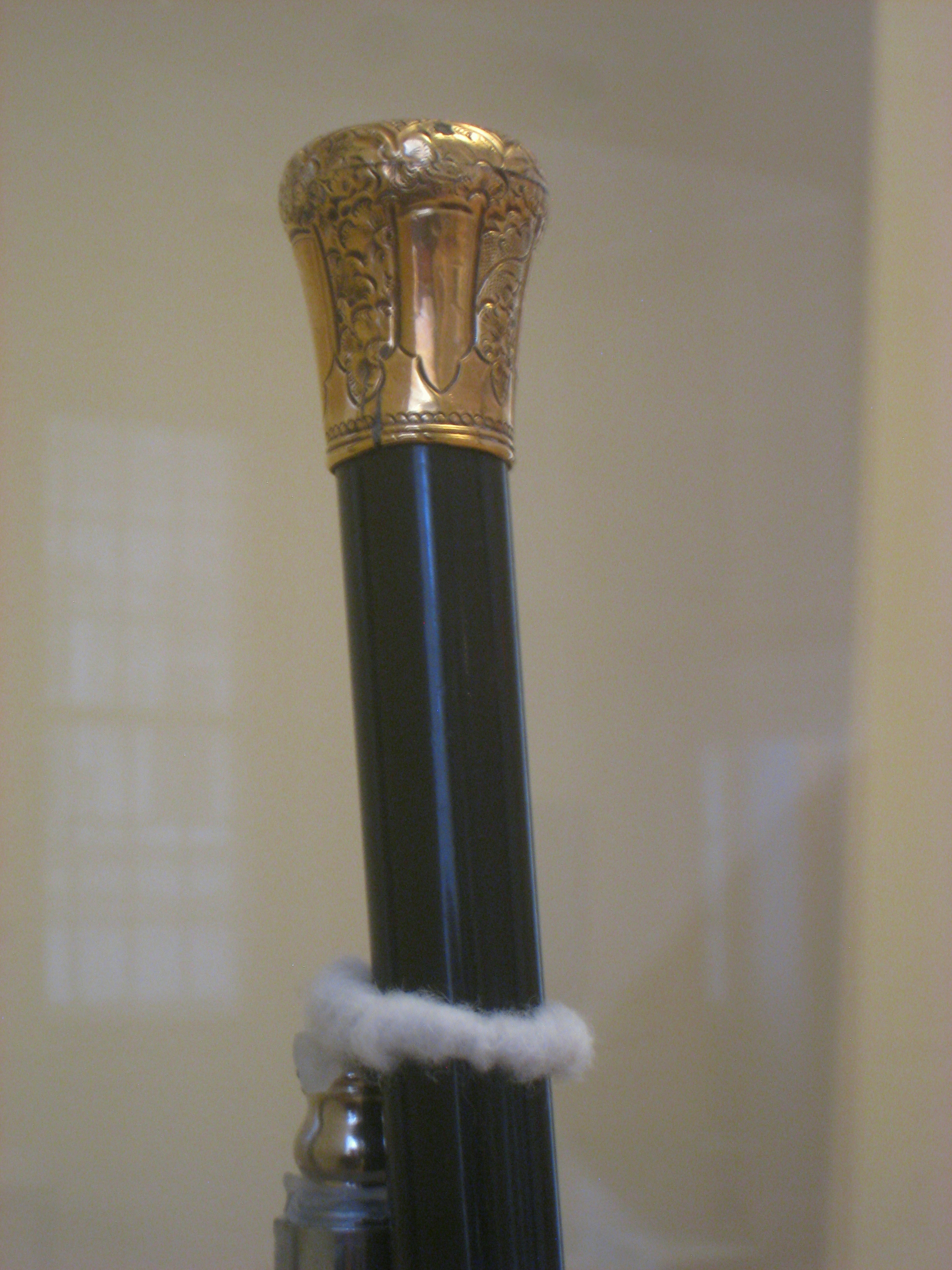
Remaining portion of Brooks' walking cane he used to attack Charles Sumner on exhibit at the Old State House in Boston

The episode revealed the polarization in the United States, which had now reached the floor of the Senate. Sumner became a martyr in the North and Brooks a hero in the South. Northerners were outraged. The Cincinnati Gazette said, "The South cannot tolerate free speech anywhere, and would stifle it in Washington with the bludgeon and the bowie-knife, as they are now trying to stifle it in Kansas by massacre, rapine, and murder." William Cullen Bryant of the New York Evening Post, asked, "Has it come to this, that we must speak with bated breath in the presence of our Southern masters? ... Are we to be chastised as they chastise their slaves? Are we too, slaves, slaves for life, a target for their brutal blows, when we do not comport ourselves to please them?" Thousands attended rallies in support of Sumner in Boston, Albany, Cleveland, Detroit, New Haven, New York, and Providence.

More than a million copies of Sumner's speech were distributed. Two weeks after the caning, Ralph Waldo Emerson described the divide the incident represented: "I do not see how a barbarous community and a civilized community can constitute one state. I think we must get rid of slavery, or we must get rid of freedom."

Numerous African-Americans wrote to Sumner after the caning, some of whom not only sympathized but also identified with him. Brooks had described his attack on Sumner as a "flogging," as if to debase Sumner and imply he was no better than a slave. As a result, some Black Americans felt he too now bore the scars of slavery.

Conversely, Brooks was praised by Southern newspapers. The Richmond Enquirer editorialized that Sumner should be caned "every morning", praising the attack as "good in conception, better in execution, and best of all in consequences" and denounced "these vulgar abolitionists in the Senate" who "have been suffered to run too long without collars. They must be lashed into submission." Southerners sent Brooks hundreds of new canes in endorsement of his assault. One was inscribed "Hit him again." Brooks was also praised for defending the honor of South Carolina, which Southerners claimed that Sumner disgraced in his speech. The Yorkville Enquirer discusses how "South Carolina may well feel proud of her son." It also goes on to say that "he has shown his willingness to avenge her insulted honor." Overall, the Southern newspapers believed that Sumner's speech was so rude that it warranted the response from Brooks.

Massachusetts Representative Anson Burlingame publicly humiliated Brooks by goading him into challenging Burlingame to a duel, only to set conditions designed to intimidate Brooks into backing down: As the challenged party, Burlingame, who was a crack shot, had the choice of weapons and dueling ground. He selected rifles on the Canada side of Niagara Falls, where U.S. anti-dueling laws would not apply. Brooks withdrew his challenge, claiming that he did not want to expose himself to the risk of violence by traveling through Northern states to get to Niagara Falls.

Senator Henry Wilson, Sumner's colleague from Massachusetts, called the beating by Brooks "brutal, murderous, and cowardly", and in response Brooks challenged Wilson to a duel. Wilson declined, saying that he could not legally or by personal conviction participate, and calling dueling "the lingering relic of a barbarous civilization". In reference to a rumor that Brooks might attack him in the Senate, Wilson told the press, "I have sought no controversy, and I seek none, but I shall go where duty requires, uninfluenced by threats of any kind." Wilson continued to perform his Senate duties, and Brooks did not make good on his threat.

Southerners mocked Sumner, claiming he was faking his injuries. They argued that the cane Brooks used was not heavy enough to inflict severe injuries. They also claimed that Brooks had not hit Sumner more than a few times, and had not hit him hard enough to cause serious health concerns. In fact, Sumner suffered head trauma that caused him chronic, debilitating pain for the rest of his life and symptoms consistent with what is now called traumatic brain injury and post-traumatic stress disorder; he spent three years convalescing before returning to his Senate seat. Massachusetts pointedly did not replace him, and left his empty desk in the Senate as a visible reminder of the incident. The state legislature reelected him in 1857, even though he was unable to take his seat until 1859.

Brooks claimed that he had not intended to kill Sumner, or else he would have used a different weapon. In a speech to the House defending his actions, Brooks stated that he "meant no disrespect to the Senate of the United States" or the House by his attack on Sumner. Brooks was arrested for the assault. He was tried in a District of Columbia court, convicted, and fined $300 (equivalent to $10,750 in 2025), but he received no prison sentence. A motion for Brooks' expulsion from the House failed, but he resigned on July 15 in order to permit his constituents to ratify or condemn his conduct via a special election. They approved; Brooks was quickly returned to office after the August 1 vote, and then re-elected to a new term of office later in 1856, but he died of croup before the new term began.

Keitt was censured by the House. He resigned in protest, and his constituents ratified his conduct by overwhelmingly reelecting him to his seat within a month. In 1858, he attempted to choke Representative Galusha A. Grow of Pennsylvania (Republican) for calling him a "negro driver" during an argument on the House floor. An effort to censure Edmundson failed to obtain a majority of votes in the House.

Historian William Gienapp has concluded that Brooks' "assault was of critical importance in transforming the struggling Republican party into a major political force". In the 1856 elections, the new Republican Party made gains by use of the twin messages of "Bleeding Kansas" and "Bleeding Sumner", because both events served to paint pro-slavery Democrats as extremists. Though the Democrats won the presidential election and increased their majority in the House because the Three-fifths Compromise gave Democrats an advantage, Republicans made major gains in elections for the state legislatures, which enabled them to make gains in the U.S. Senate elections, because senators were chosen by the state legislatures. The violence in Kansas and the beating of Sumner helped the Republicans coalesce and cohere as a party, which set the stage for their victory in the 1860 presidential election.

During the 1856 lame-duck session of Congress, Brooks made a speech calling for the admission of Kansas "even with a constitution rejecting slavery". His conciliatory tone impressed Northerners and disappointed slavery's supporters.

The caning was a motivating factor in the abduction and murder of five pro-slavery Kansas settlers by abolitionist leader John Brown in the Pottawatomie massacre.

== See also ==
- 1858 Congressional brawl
- List of incidents of political violence in Washington, D.C.
- Timeline of events leading to the American Civil War
