= John L. Magee (artist) =

American cartoonist

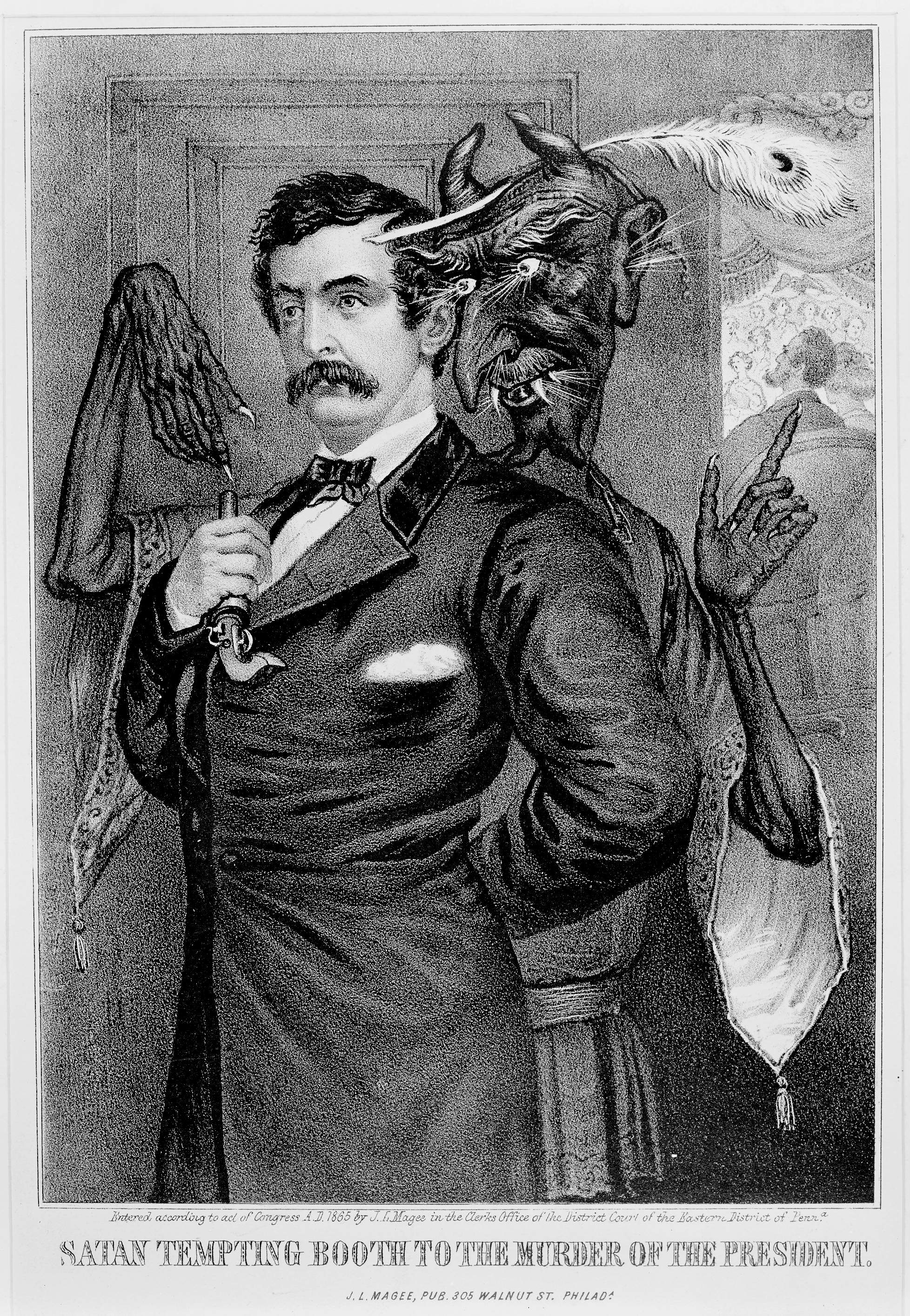
Satan tempting Booth to the murder of the President by Magee, c. 1865

John L. Magee (c. 1820–1870s?) was an American artist, lithographer, and engraver.

Magee was born in New York. He created lithographs for New York publishing companies, including for Nathaniel Currier, and exhibited three paintings at the National Academy of Design, including The Mischievous Boy, in 1844. He began his own business in 1850, and moved to Philadelphia, Pennsylvania in ~1852, where he would publish prints based on news and sports events. He would become well known for his political art. His last publications would be published in 1866-1867.

Magee was an opponent of Slavery, and later the Confederacy and Andrew Johnson. His political cartoons positively depicted Winfield Scott, John C. Fremont, and other figures of the Whig Party and Republican Party.

== Gallery ==
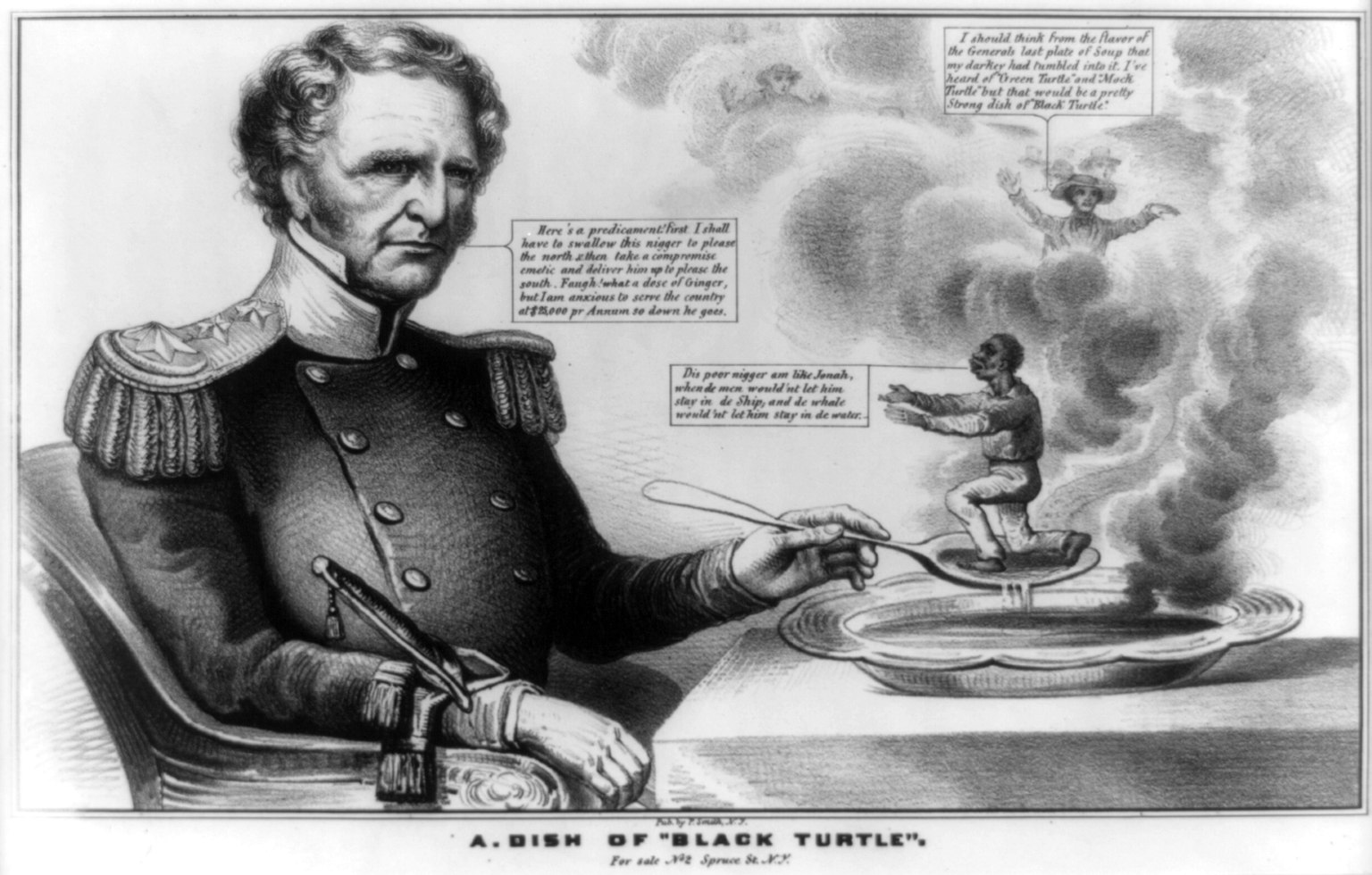
A dish of "black turtle"

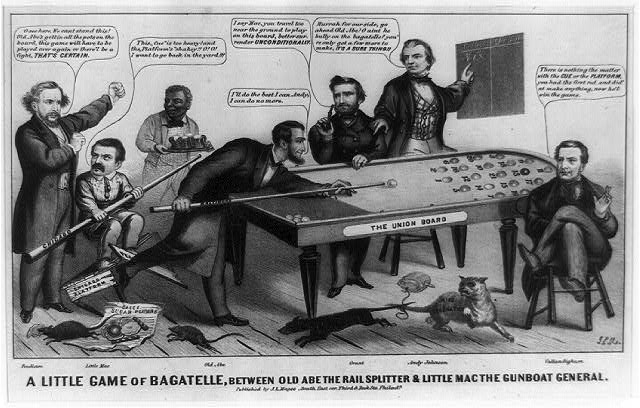
A little game of bagatelle, between Old Abe the rail splitter & Little Mac the gunboat general

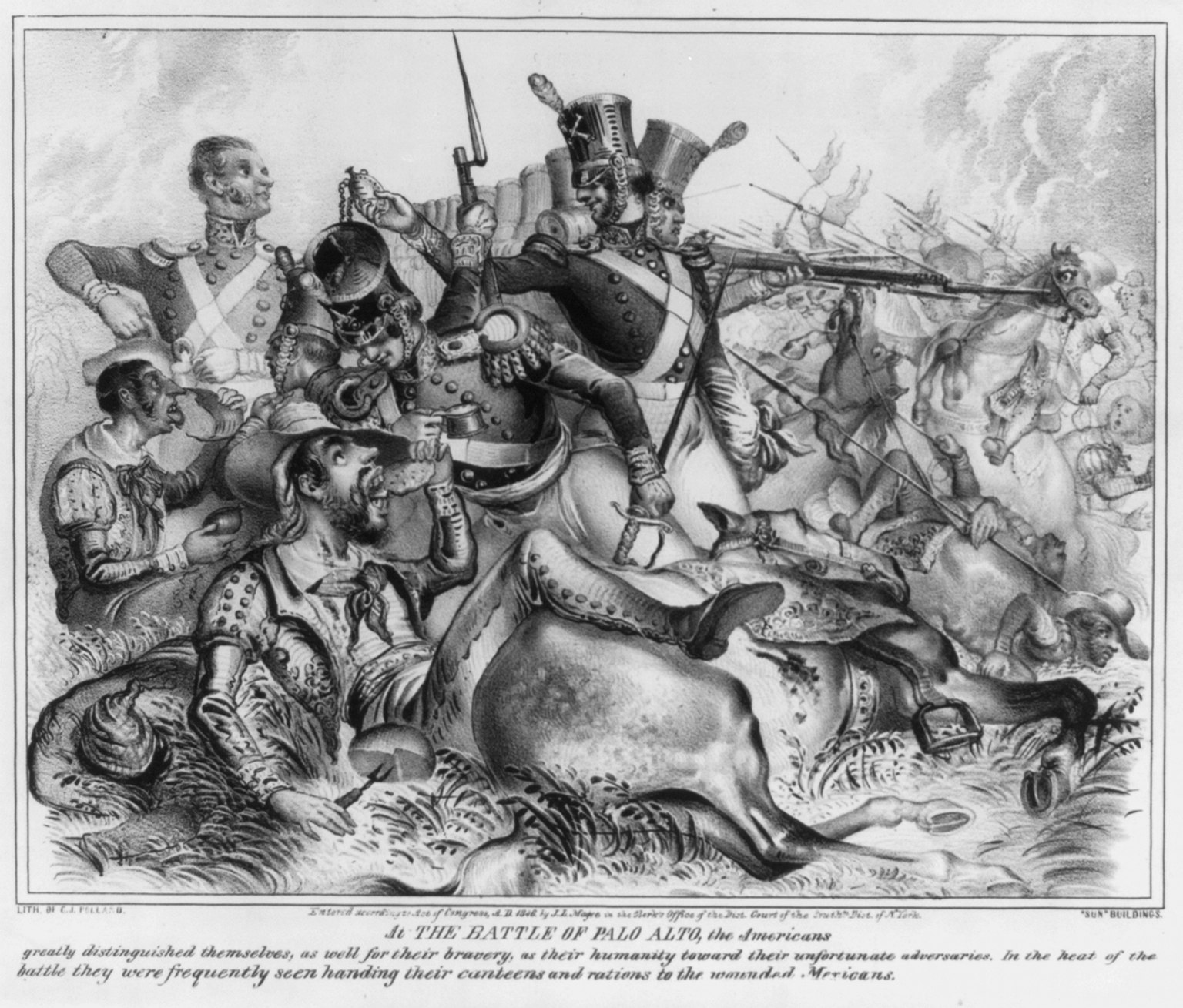
At the Battle of Palo Alto, the Americans greatly distinguished themselves

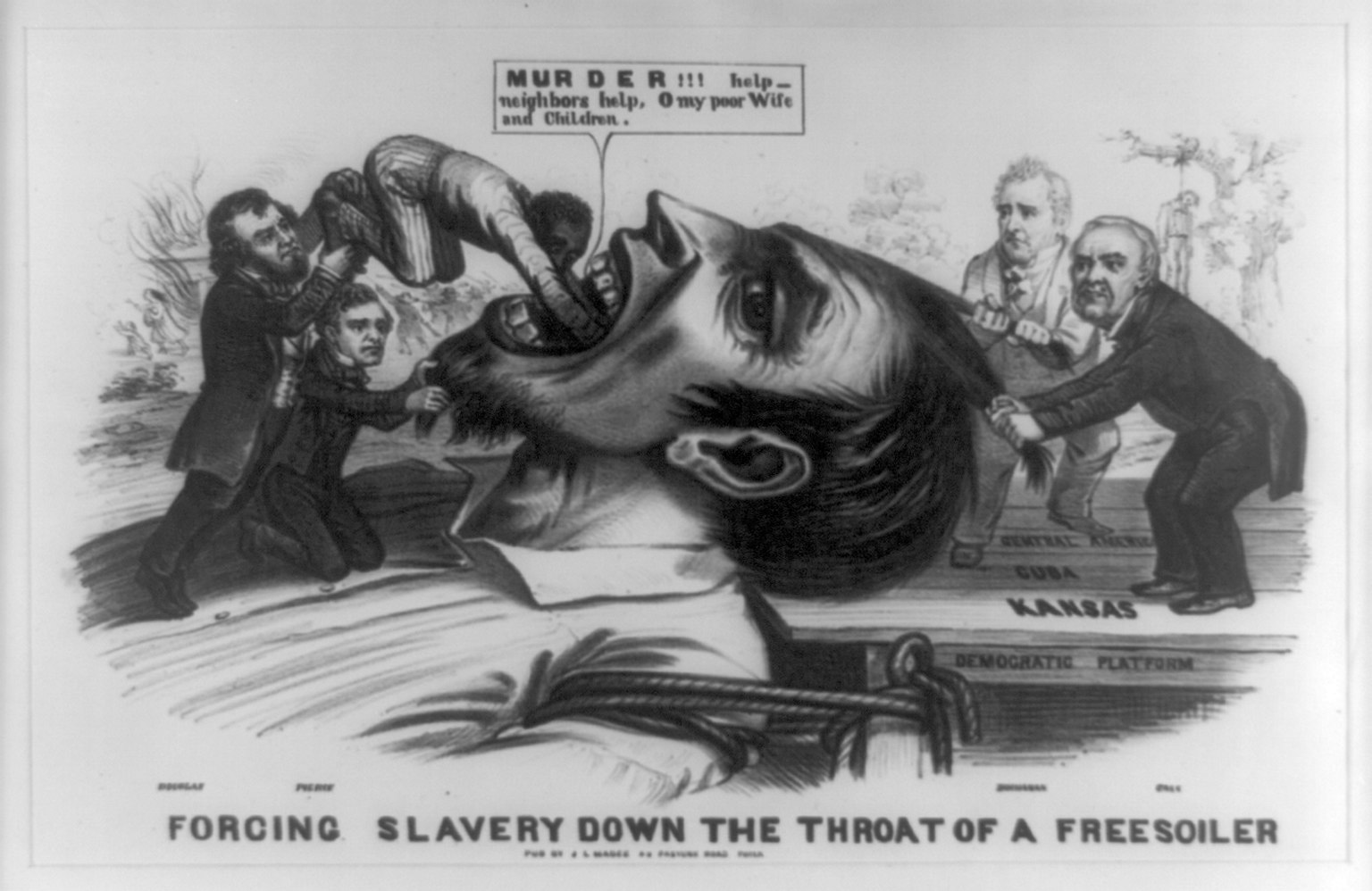
Forcing slavery down the throat of a freesoiler

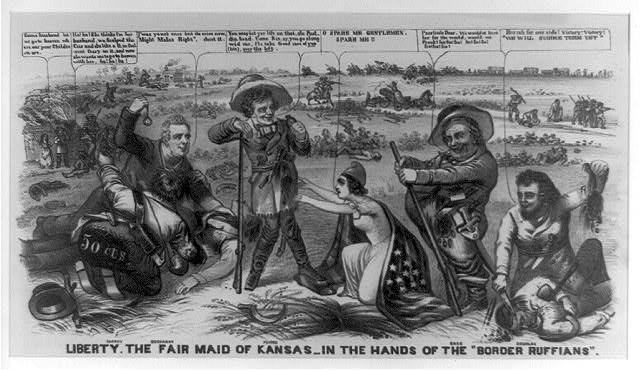
Liberty, the fair maid of Kansas-in the hands of the "border ruffians"

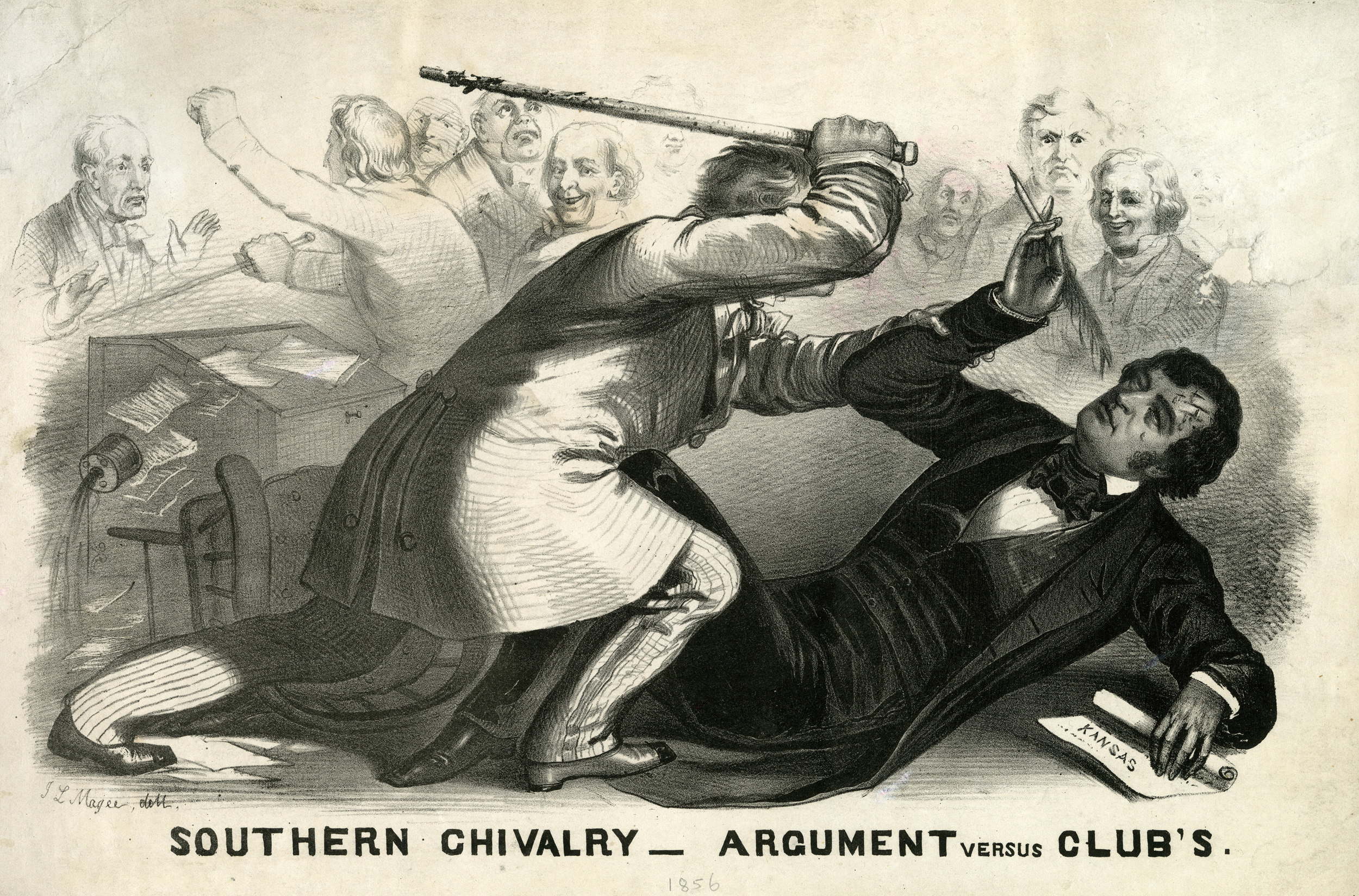
Southern Chivalry

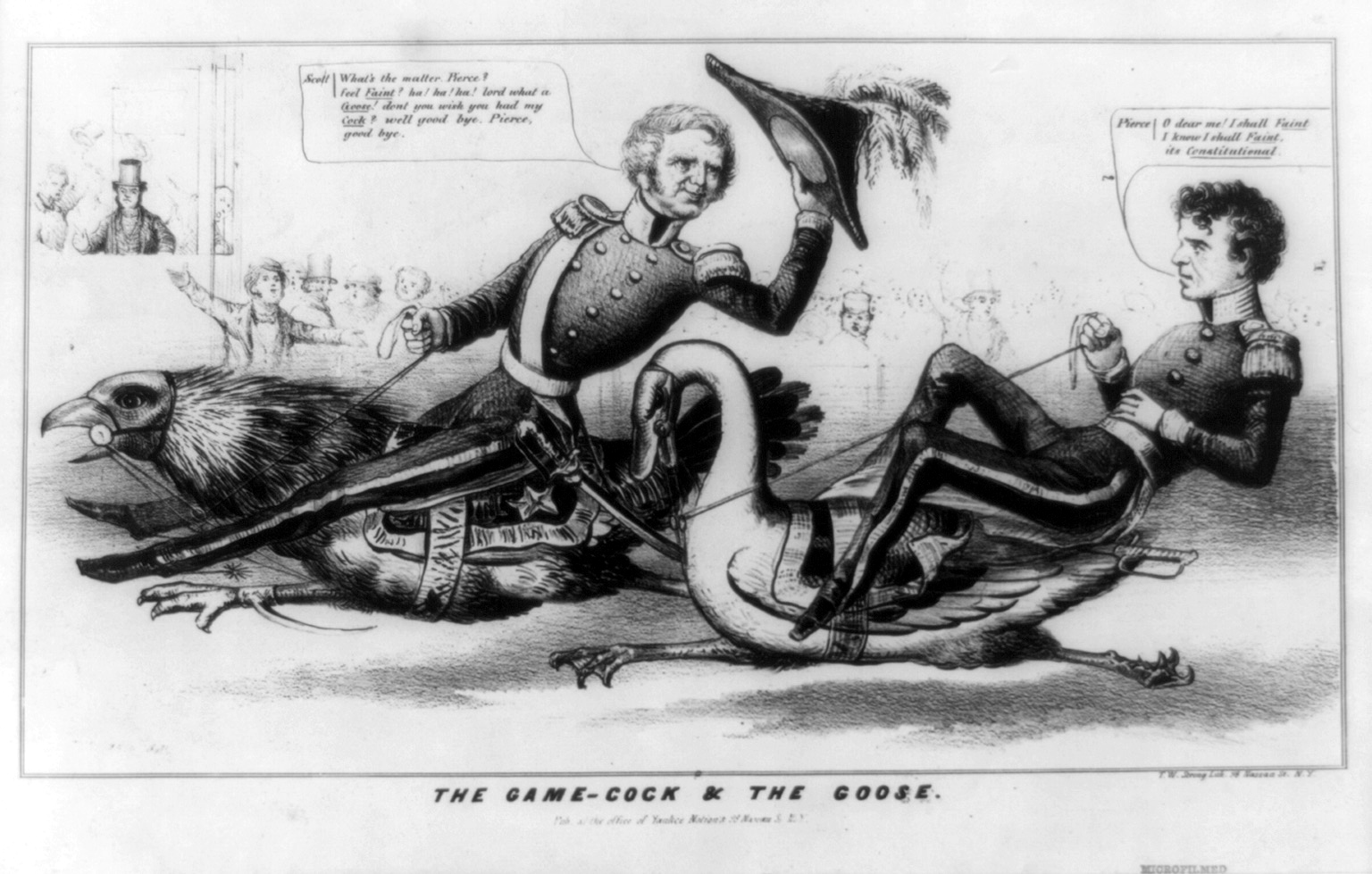
The game-cock & the goose

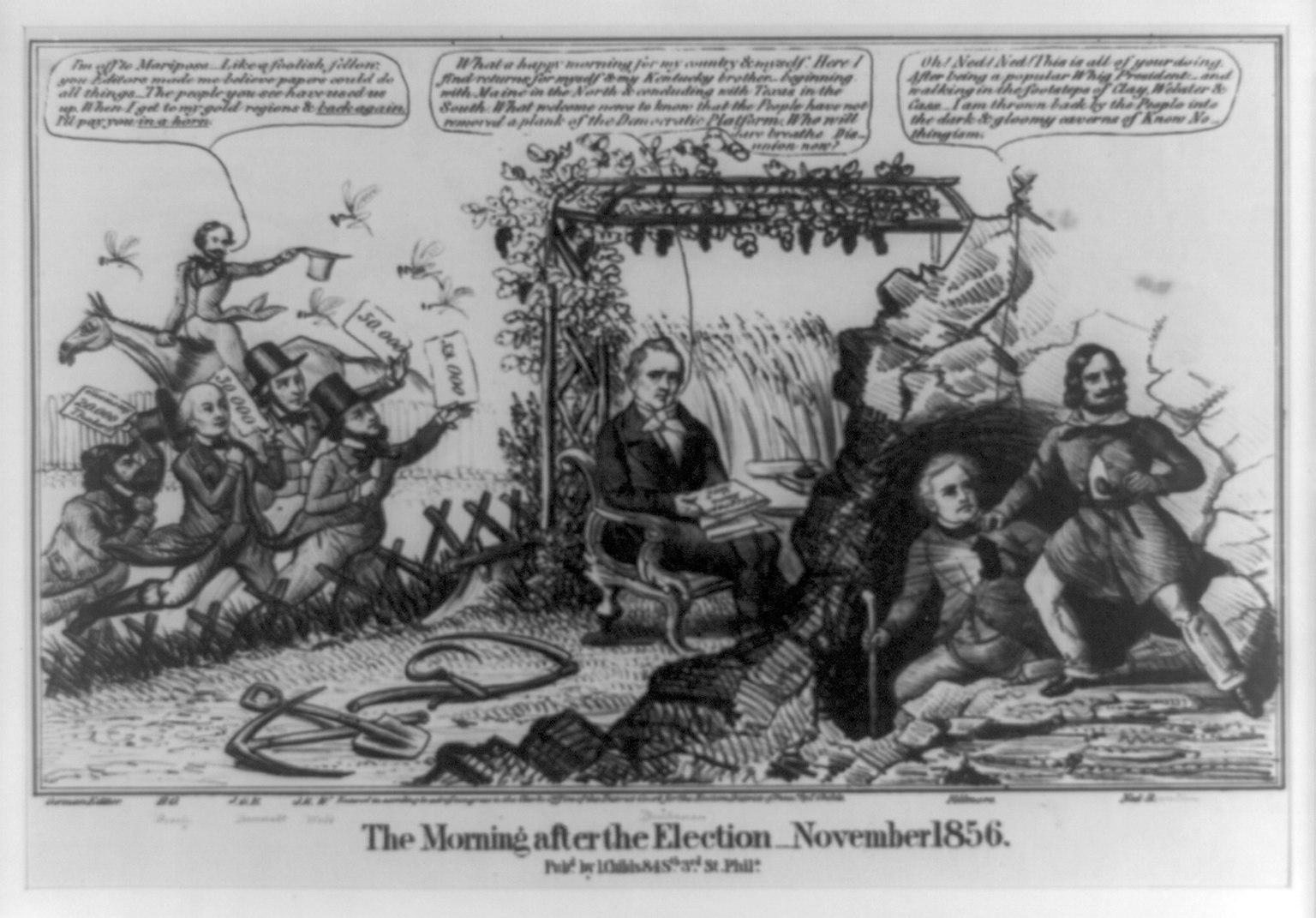
The morning after the election
