= National Register of Historic Places listings in Davie County, North Carolina =

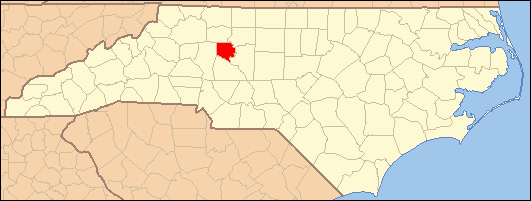

This list includes properties and districts listed on the National Register of Historic Places in Davie County, North Carolina. Click the "Map of all coordinates" link to the right to view a Google map of all properties and districts with latitude and longitude coordinates in the table below.

== Current listings ==
This National Park Service list is complete through NPS recent listings posted March 14, 2025.

	Name on the Register	Image	Date listed	Location	City or town	Description
1	George E. Barnhardt House		May 4, 2009 (#09000289)	291 Hartley Rd. 35°49′19″N 80°29′02″W	Mocksville	
2	Boxwood Lodge		June 2, 1995 (#95000673)	132 Becktown Rd. 35°48′46″N 80°30′45″W	Mocksville	
3	Cana Store and Post Office		October 5, 2001 (#01001073)	NC 1411, 0.2 miles N of NC 1406; 35°58′24″N 80°34′38″W	Mocksville	
4	Center Arbor	Center Arbor	September 3, 1991 (#91001168)	Jct. of US 64 and NC 1150, NW corner 35°54′42″N 80°37′14″W	Center	
5	Jesse Clement House	Jesse Clement House	April 17, 1980 (#80002823)	Maple Ave. 35°53′17″N 80°33′33″W	Mocksville	
6	Cooleemee	Cooleemee	March 20, 1973 (#73001334)	Terminus of SR 1812; 35°51′12″N 80°24′36″W	Mocksville	
7	Cooleemee Mill Town Historic District		September 24, 2014 (#14000704)	Roughly bounded by Marginal, Hickory, Center & Holt Sts., Neely & Pine Ridge Rds., S. Yadkin R. 35°48′26″N 80°33′22″W	Cooleemee	
8	Davie County Courthouse	Davie County Courthouse	May 10, 1979 (#79001702)	Courthouse Sq. 35°53′37″N 80°33′41″W	Mocksville	
9	Davie County Jail	Davie County Jail	April 24, 1973 (#73001335)	20 S. Main St. 35°53′35″N 80°33′39″W	Mocksville	
10	Downtown Mocksville Historic District	Downtown Mocksville Historic District	June 1, 1990 (#90000821)	Roughly Main St. from Water to Gaither Sts., including Town Square; 35°53′39″N 80°33′43″W	Mocksville	
11	Farmington Historic District	Farmington Historic District	December 27, 2010 (#10001059)	Farmington Rd., NC 801 North, Cemetery Rd., Roland Rd., and Hartman Lane; 36°00′57″N 80°31′57″W	Farmington	
12	Foard-Tatum House		May 26, 1994 (#94000530)	At end of NC 1101; 35°47′35″N 80°31′21″W	Cooleemee	
13	Fulton United Methodist Church		November 15, 1979 (#79001701)	S of Advance off NC 801; 35°53′09″N 80°25′08″W	Advance	
14	Hinton Rowan Helper House	Hinton Rowan Helper House	November 7, 1973 (#73001336)	U.S. 64 off I-40; 35°54′25″N 80°36′17″W	Mocksville	
15	Hodges Business College		August 16, 2000 (#00000990)	NC 1819, 0.15 miles SE of jct. with NC 801; 35°50′20″N 80°30′14″W	Mocksville	
16	McGuire-Setzer House		September 4, 1992 (#92001152)	NC 1139 0.2 miles S of Mocksville town limits 35°52′49″N 80°34′15″W	Mocksville	
17	North Main Street Historic District	North Main Street Historic District	June 1, 1990 (#90000822)	Roughly Main St. from Church St. to Mocksville city limits 35°54′04″N 80°33′17″W	Mocksville	
18	Salisbury Street Historic District	Salisbury Street Historic District	June 1, 1990 (#90000819)	Roughly Salisbury St. from Kelly St. to Lexington Rd. 35°53′23″N 80°33′54″W	Mocksville	
19	John Edward Belle Shutt House and Outbuildings		May 16, 1996 (#96000567)	2177 NC 801, S 35°56′09″N 80°24′33″W	Advance	
20	Win-Mock Farm Dairy	Win-Mock Farm Dairy	December 27, 2010 (#10001057)	168 E. Kinderton Way; 36°00′45″N 80°25′25″W	Bermuda Run	

== See also ==
- National Register of Historic Places listings in North Carolina
- List of National Historic Landmarks in North Carolina
