= Clement House =

Clement House or Clements House may refer to:

United Kingdom

- LSE Clement House

United States

- Wilson-Clements House, Northport, Alabama, listed on the NRHP in Tuscaloosa County, Alabama
- Clements Rowhouse, Denver, Colorado, listed on the NRHP in downtown Denver, Colorado
- House at 7144 Madrid Avenue, Jacksonville, Florida, also known as the Clements House, NRHP-listed
- Le Vega Clements House, Owensboro, Kentucky, listed on the NRHP in Daviess County, Kentucky
- Clements House (Springfield, Kentucky), listed on the NRHP in Washington County, Kentucky
- Henry Clements House, Lansing, Michigan, Michigan historic site in Eaton County, Michigan
- C.C. Clement House, Fergus Falls, Minnesota, listed on the NRHP in Otter Tail County, Minnesota
- Clement House (Buffalo, New York), contributing property to the NRHP listed Delaware Avenue Historic District
- Jesse Clement House, Mocksville, North Carolina, listed on the NRHP in Davie County, North Carolina
- George S. Clement House, Wauseon, Ohio, NRHP-listed
- Clement-Nagel House, Cuero, Texas, listed on the NRHP in DeWitt County, Texas
- Clementwood, Rutland, Vermont, listed on the NRHP in Rutland County, Vermont
- Proctor-Clement House, Rutland, Vermont, listed on the NRHP in Rutland County, Vermont

== See also ==
- Clements Café, Dublin, Ireland
- Clements Hall, Dallas, Texas, listed on the NRHP in Dallas County, Texas
- Clements State Bank Building, Clements, Minnesota, listed on the NRHP in Redwood County, Minnesota
- James Clements Airport Administration Building, Bay City, Michigan, NRHP-listed
