= North Carolina Highway 801 =

State highway in North Carolina, US

North Carolina Highway 801

Route information
- Maintained by NCDOT
- Length: 53.9 mi (86.7 km)
- Existed: 1927–1928–present

Major junctions
- South end: NC 152 in Mooresville
- US 70 near Cleveland; I-40 in Bermuda Run
- North end: US 601 near Farmington

Location
- Country: United States
- State: North Carolina
- Counties: Iredell, Rowan, Davie

Highway system
- North Carolina Highway System; Interstate; US; State; Scenic
← I-795	→ I-840

North Carolina Highway 801 (NC 801) is a primary state highway in the U.S. state of North Carolina. The highway runs north–south, traversing the central Piedmont region of the state.

== Route description ==
A two-lane rural highway, it traverses 53.9 miles (86.7 km) from Mooresville to U.S. Route 601 (US 601) near Farmington. It links several small towns and communities including Cooleemee, Advance, Farmington, and Bermuda Run.

== History ==
NC 801 was first commissioned in 1927–28 as a short route traveling east–west from to NC 65 (now US 158) at the now-defunct town of Hillsdale. The route was extended south from its eastern terminus to connect with NC 90 (now US 64) by 1930, becoming a north–south route. In 1933, the route was extended again, from NC 90 southwest to Mooresville, replacing all of NC 803, which ran from US 601 south of Mocksville to NC 26 (now US 29) in Mooresville. Between 1934 and 1936, NC 801 was rerouted in the Hillsdale area, eliminating a concurrency with US 158. In the early 1950s, another short concurrency, with US 64, was replaced with a continuous alignment. When US 70 was shifted onto a new alignment, so did the NC 801 concurrency between 1956 and 1958.

=== North Carolina Highway 803 ===
North Carolina Highway 803 (NC 803) was established as a new primary routing in 1931 as a spur of NC 80 (now US 601) to Cooleemee. In 1932 it was extended southwest through Barber to NC 150 (now NC 152) in Mooresville. In 1933, it was replaced by an extension of NC 801.

== Junction list ==
County	Location	mi	km	Destinations	Notes
Iredell	Mooresville	0.0	0.0	NC 152 (North Main Street) / East Park Avenue – China Grove	
Iredell	Mooresville	1.5	2.4	NC 150 (Oakridge Farm Highway) to I-77 – Lincolnton, Salisbury	
Rowan	Barber	14.4	23.2	US 70 west / Barber Junction Road – Statesville	Southern end of US 70 concurrency
Rowan		15.8	25.4	US 70 east / Celanese Drive – Salisbury	Northern end of US 70 concurrency
Davie	Davie Crossroads	25.0	40.2	US 601 – Mocksville, Salisbury	
Davie	Fork Church	32.2	51.8	US 64 – Mocksville, Lexington	
Davie	Bermuda Run	42.6	68.6	US 158	
Davie	Bermuda Run	42.8– 43.0	68.9– 69.2	I-40 – Winston-Salem, Statesville	Exit 180 (I-40)
Davie		53.9	86.7	US 601 – Mocksville, Yadkinville	
1.000 mi = 1.609 km; 1.000 km = 0.621 mi: Concurrency terminus
