= Advance, North Carolina =

- Census-designated place
- Location in North Carolina
- Coordinates: 35°56′49″N 80°24′16″W
- Country: United States
- State: North Carolina
- County: Davie

Area
  - Total: 7.22 sq mi (18.69 km^{2})
  - Land: 7.16 sq mi (18.55 km^{2})
  - Water: 0.058 sq mi (0.15 km^{2})
- Elevation: 755 ft (230 m)

Population (2020)
  - Total: 1,499
  - Density: 209.3/sq mi (80.82/km^{2})
- Time zone: UTC-5 (Eastern (EST))
  - Summer (DST): UTC-4 (EDT)
- ZIP code: 27006
- Area code: 336
- FIPS code: 37-00440
- GNIS feature ID: 2584307

Advance (pronounced AD-vance) is an unincorporated community and census-designated place (CDP) in Davie County, North Carolina, United States. It is 75 miles northeast of Charlotte, with the northern outskirts of Advance in proximity to Winston-Salem. The population was 1,499 at the 2020 census. It is located along North Carolina Highway 801, south of Bermuda Run. Advance is part of the Piedmont Triad region of North Carolina.

== Geography ==
Advance is located in eastern Davie County. The Yadkin River forms the eastern edge of the CDP and forms the western border of Davidson County. According to the U.S. Census Bureau, the CDP has a total area of 7.2 square miles (18.7 km^{2}), of which 7.1 square miles (18.5 km^{2}) is land and 0.1 square miles (0.2 km^{2}), or 0.95%, is water. Neighboring communities and municipalities include Bermuda Run, 4 miles (6 km) to the north, and Mocksville, the Davie County seat, 11 miles (18 km) to the west. The largest nearby city is Winston-Salem.

== Demographics ==
Historical population
Census	Pop.	Note	%±
2020	1,499		—
U.S. Decennial Census

=== 2020 census ===
Advance racial composition
Race	Number	Percentage
White (non-Hispanic)	1,339	89.33%
Black or African American (non-Hispanic)	39	2.6%
Native American	2	0.13%
Asian	7	0.47%
Other/Mixed	55	3.67%
Hispanic or Latino	57	3.8%

As of the 2020 United States census, there were 1,499 people, 469 households, and 320 families residing in the CDP.

== Etymology ==
Various accounts exist for the origin of the town's name. Some suggest the name was derived from the name of a popular resident and freed slave, Samuel Vance Allen. Other accounts suggest the community was named by residents who hoped that with the addition of a post office, the community would advance.

== Encompassing communities ==
While Advance remains unincorporated, it is recognized by the United States Postal Service under ZIP Code 27006. The common area of Advance includes several smaller unincorporated communities that are not recognized by the Postal Service:

- Bixby
- Cornatzer
- Farmington (south of Spillman Road)
- Fork Church
- Fulton
- Hillsdale
- Redland
- Shady Grove
- Smith Grove

== Education ==
Public schools in Advance are operated by Davie County Schools. Schools within advance are:

- Shady Grove Elementary School
- William Ellis Middle School

Macedonia Moravian Preschool is a local private school.

== Landmarks ==
One significant landmark in the Advance area is the Vestal Potts Gymnasium. The basketball gymnasium is named after legendary coach Vestal Potts who coached Shady Grove's basketball teams to numerous championships.

Fulton United Methodist Church and John Edward Belle Shutt House and Outbuildings are listed on the National Register of Historic Places.

== Notable people ==
- Ted Budd, United States Senator; former U.S. Congressman
- Virginia Newell, politician, educator and author, born in Advance
