= Lynn Wells Rumley =

American civil rights activist

Lynn Wells Rumley is a historian and politician associated with Cooleemee, North Carolina known for her efforts to preserve the textile history of Cooleemee.

Prior to moving to Cooleemee, she was a civil rights activist in Atlanta, Georgia during the 1960s and was a member of the Student Nonviolent Coordinating Committee (SNCC), the Southern Student Organizing Committee (SSOC), and then a national leader of Students for a Democratic Society and the Revolutionary Youth Movement in the late 1960s.

Rumley served as director of the Cooleemee Historical Association / Textile Heritage Center for several decades from 1989 until 2017, and as the mayor of Cooleemee from 1998 until 2021. The previous mayor of Cooleemee and black residents of the town criticized her for advocating racist policies and glorifying the Confederacy under the guise of traditional values.
