= List of National Historic Landmarks in North Carolina =

This is a List of National Historic Landmarks in North Carolina.

North Carolina has 40 National Historic Landmarks, and one former landmark.

== Key ==
	National Historic Landmark
^{†}	National Historic Landmark District
^{#}	National Historic Site, National Historical Park, National Memorial, or National Monument
^{*}	Delisted Landmark

== List ==
	Landmark name	Image	Date designated	Location	County	Description
1^{†}	Bentonville Battlefield	Bentonville Battlefield	June 19, 1996 (#70000460)	Bentonville and Newton Grove; 35°18′23″N 78°19′26″W	Johnston	Site of Battle of Bentonville
2^{†}	Bethabara	Bethabara	January 20, 1999 (#78001948)	Winston-Salem; 36°09′16″N 80°17′55″W	Forsyth	Area of 1753 Moravian settlement
3^{†}	Bethania Historic District	Bethania Historic District	August 7, 2001 (#76001321)	Bethania; 36°11′02″N 80°20′13″W	Forsyth	
4^{†}	Biltmore Estate	Biltmore Estate	May 23, 1963 (#66000586)	Asheville; 35.53965°N 82.55095°W; 35°32′23″N 82°33′03″W	Buncombe	Largest private residence in the united states.
5	W. T. Blackwell and Company Tobacco Factory	W. T. Blackwell and Company Tobacco Factory	December 22, 1977 (#74001346)	Durham; 35°59′44″N 78°54′14″W	Durham	Also known as Bull Durham Tobacco Factory.
6	Blandwood	Blandwood	June 7, 1988 (#70000455)	Greensboro; 36°04′13″N 79°47′44″W	Guilford	Former home of progressive North Carolina Governor John Motley Morehead, designed by New York architect Alexander Jackson Davis in the Italian Tuscan style.
7	Blue Ridge Parkway	Blue Ridge Parkway	December 13, 2024 (#100011353)	Blue Ridge Parkway through Virginia and North Carolina; 36°26′03″N 81°03′48″W	Alleghany, Ashe, Watauga, Avery, Mitchell, Yancey, Buncombe, Henderson, Haywood, Transylvania, Jackson, Swain	
8^{†}	Cape Hatteras Light Station	Cape Hatteras Light Station	August 5, 1998 (#78000266)	Buxton; 35°15′02″N 75°31′44″W	Dare	At 208 feet (63 m) tall, tallest lighthouse in the United States.
9	Capitol (North Carolina)	Capitol (North Carolina)	November 6, 1973 (#70000476)	Raleigh; 35°46′52″N 78°38′20″W	Wake	Capitol building, part of Capitol Area Historic District.
10	Chowan County Courthouse	Chowan County Courthouse	April 15, 1970 (#70000447)	Edenton; 36°03′28″N 76°36′29″W	Chowan	
11	Christ Episcopal Church	Christ Episcopal Church	December 23, 1987 (#87002597)	Raleigh; 35°46′52″N 78°38′16″W	Wake	Perhaps earliest Gothic architecture church in the South, designed in 1846 by Richard Upjohn
12^{#}	Connemara, The Carl Sandburg Farm	Connemara, The Carl Sandburg Farm	May 23, 1968 (#68000013)	Flat Rock; 35°16′04″N 82°27′06″W	Henderson	
13	Cooleemee	Cooleemee	June 2, 1978 (#73001334)	Mocksville; 35°51′12″N 80°24′36″W	Davie	Innovative Piedmont plantation house influenced by designs of architect William H. Ranlett.
14	Coolmore	Coolmore	June 2, 1978 (#71000581)	Tarboro; 35°55′29″N 77°35′46″W	Edgecombe	Plantation
15	Cupola House	Cupola House	April 15, 1970 (#70000889)	Edenton; 36°03′28″N 76°36′33″W	Chowan	A house with a cupola
16	Duke Homestead and Tobacco Factory	Duke Homestead and Tobacco Factory	November 13, 1966 (#66000590)	Durham; 36°02′06″N 78°55′16″W	Durham	Homestead and factory of Washington Duke
17	Fort Fisher	Fort Fisher	November 5, 1961 (#66000595)	Wilmington; 33°58′18″N 77°55′10″W	New Hanover	A fort
18	Guilford Court House Battlefield	Guilford Court House Battlefield	January 3, 2001 (#66000069)	Greensboro; 36°07′53″N 79°50′47″W	Guilford	Partially preserved site of American Revolutionary War's Battle of Guilford Court House
19	Hardaway Site	Hardaway Site	June 21, 1990 (#84002529)	Badin; 35°24′38″N 80°06′53″W	Stanly	An archaeological site
20	Hayes Plantation	Hayes Plantation	November 7, 1973 (#74001341)	Edenton; 36°02′53″N 76°36′08″W	Chowan	A plantation
21	Hinton Rowan Helper House	Hinton Rowan Helper House	November 7, 1973 (#73001336)	Mocksville; 35°54′18″N 80°36′17″W	Davie	Former home of abolitionist and author of nationally influential publication "The Impending Crisis of the South".
22	Market House	Market House	November 7, 1973 (#70000451)	Fayetteville; 35°03′09″N 78°52′42″W	Cumberland	Market below, town hall above
23	MONITOR	MONITOR	June 23, 1986 (#74002299)	Cape Hatteras; 35°00′06″N 75°24′23″W	Dare	USS Monitor shipwreck (ironclad).
24	Pauli Murray Family Home	Pauli Murray Family Home	December 23, 2016 (#100000866)	Durham; 35°59′34″N 78°54′59″W	Durham	Now the Pauli Murray Center.
25	Nash-Hooper House	Nash-Hooper House	November 11, 1971 (#71000610)	Hillsborough; 36°04′37″N 79°06′01″W	Orange	NRHP 71000610
26	North Carolina Mutual Life Insurance Company Building	North Carolina Mutual Life Insurance Company Building	May 15, 1975 (#75001258)	Durham; 35°59′45″N 78°54′03″W	Durham	1921 commercial building; second headquarters of a major black-owned insurance company.
27	NORTH CAROLINA	NORTH CAROLINA	January 14, 1986 (#82004893)	Wilmington; 34°14′06″N 77°56′34″W	New Hanover	NRHP 82004893. USS North Carolina (battleship).
28	Old East	Old East	December 21, 1965 (#66000596)	Chapel Hill; 35°54′38″N 79°03′03″W	Orange	First building of first state university in the United States, built in 1795
29^{†}	Old Salem Historic District	Old Salem Historic District	November 13, 1966 (#66000591)	Winston-Salem; 36°05′12″N 80°14′31″W	Forsyth	Early Moravian settlement, now a museum
30	Palmer-Marsh House	Palmer-Marsh House	April 15, 1970 (#70000439)	Bath; 35°28′30″N 76°48′51″W	Beaufort	
31^{†}	Pinehurst Historic District	Pinehurst Historic District	June 19, 1996 (#73001361)	Pinehurst; 35°11′42″N 79°28′23″W	Moore	Resort community designed by Frederick Law Olmsted; also includes Pinehurst Resort
32	Playmakers Theatre	Playmakers Theatre	November 7, 1973 (#71000605)	Chapel Hill; 35°54′17″N 79°03′02″W	Orange	Academic building in the Greek Revival style by New York architect Alexander Jackson Davis.
33^{†}	Reed Gold Mine	Reed Gold Mine	May 23, 1966 (#66000587)	Concord; 35°17′08″N 80°28′12″W	Cabarrus	Site of first gold discovery in United States
34	Salem Tavern	Salem Tavern	January 29, 1964 (#66000592)	Winston-Salem; 36°05′07″N 80°14′30″W	Forsyth	Vernacular structure erected in the eighteenth century that served as a social center of the North Carolina Piedmont.
35	Single Brothers' House	Single Brothers' House	April 15, 1970 (#70000454)	Winston-Salem; 36°05′15″N 80°14′32″W	Forsyth	Early vernacular structure that exemplifies the central European architectural traditions of the Moravians.
36	Town Creek Indian Mound	Town Creek Indian Mound	July 19, 1964 (#66000594)	Mount Gilead; 35°10′58″N 79°55′46″W	Montgomery	Archaeological site
37	Union Tavern	Union Tavern	May 15, 1975 (#75001245)	Milton; 36°32′12″N 79°12′24″W	Caswell	Early nineteenth century vernacular structure with strong associations with influential freedman cabinetmaker Thomas Day.
38	Thomas Wolfe House	Thomas Wolfe House	November 11, 1971 (#71000572)	Asheville; 35°35′45″N 82°32′43″W	Buncombe	
39	F. W. Woolworth Company Building	F. W. Woolworth Company Building	December 13, 2024 (#100011389)	134 S. Elm Street; 36°04′18″N 79°47′25″W	Guilford	Site of the Greensboro sit-ins; now a museum.
40^{#}	Wright Brothers National Memorial Visitor Center	Wright Brothers National Memorial Visitor Center	January 3, 2001 (#66000071)	Kill Devil Hills; 36°01′14″N 75°40′03″W	Dare	

== Former NHLs in North Carolina ==
	Landmark name	Image	Date designated	Date moved or withdrawn	Locality	County	Description
1	Josephus Daniels House		December 8, 1976	September 2, 2024	Raleigh	Wake	Home of Josephus Daniels, destroyed 2021

== See also ==
- National Register of Historic Places listings in North Carolina
- List of National Historic Landmarks by state
- List of National Natural Landmarks in North Carolina
