= Hinton Rowan Helper House =

Historic house in North Carolina, United States

- U.S. National Register of Historic Places
- U.S. National Historic Landmark
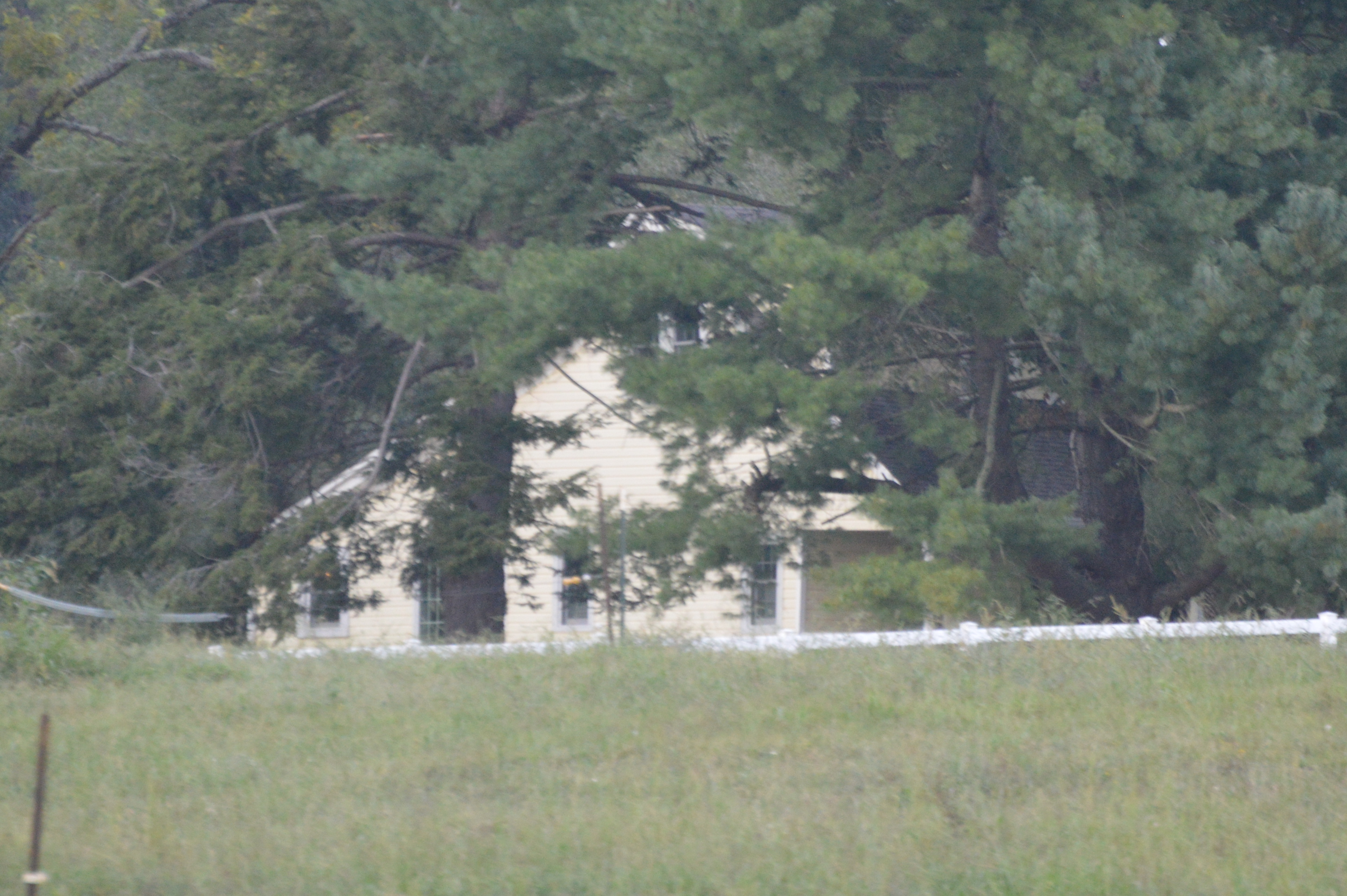
- Distant view from U.S. Route 64

- Location within North Carolina Location within the United States
- Location: U.S. Route 64 east of Interstate 40, Mocksville, North Carolina
- Coordinates: 35°54′25″N 80°36′6.7″W
- Area: 1.5 acres (0.61 ha)
- Built: 1829
- NRHP reference No.: 73001336

Significant dates
- Added to NRHP: November 7, 1973
- Designated NHL: November 7, 1973

The Hinton Rowan Helper House is a historic house on United States Route 64 outside Mocksville, Davie County, North Carolina. Built on land that once belonged to Daniel Boone, it was the childhood and early adult home of Hinton Rowan Helper (1829-1909) whose The Impending Crisis of the South (published 1857) was an influential antislavery work that inflamed tensions in 1860. The house was added to the National Register of Historic Places and declared a National Historic Landmark in 1973.

== Description and history ==
The Hinton Rowan Helper House is located west of Mocksville, set back from the north side of United States Route 64, a short way east of Bear Creek, on a 1.5-acre (0.61 ha) parcel of land that was once part of the Boone Tract, granted to Squire Boone and later owned by Daniel Boone. The location is marked by a state historic marker. It is a 1 1/2-story structure, with a central log structure at the core, and later frame additions to the side and rear. Its exterior is finished in clapboard siding. The gabled roof extends over the front porch, which is supported by posts, and there is a historic shed roof extension to the rear, with a modern kitchen ell added. The front parlor of the house shows exposed log construction, and some doorway thresholds are original split logs.

It was here that author Hinton Rowan Helper (1829-1909) spent the first twenty years of his life, living in an area where he experienced directly the impact of slavery, not just on the slaves, but also on the white lower classes. In 1857 he published The Impending Crisis of the South, a reasoned polemic arguing that slavery was economically bad for most Southern whites, because it concentrated power and money in the slaveowning plantation elites and suppressed wages and drives to industrialize the region. The work was met with fury in the South, where it was banned, and was used by the Republican Party as campaign material in the 1860 United States election.

== See also ==
- List of National Historic Landmarks in North Carolina
- National Register of Historic Places listings in Davie County, North Carolina
