= Cooleemee Mill Town Historic District =

Historic district in North Carolina, United States

- U.S. National Register of Historic Places
- U.S. Historic district
- Location within North Carolina Location within the United States
- Location: Roughly bounded by Marginal, Hickory, Center & Holt Sts., Neely & Pine Ridge Rds., S. Yadkin R., Cooleemee, North Carolina
- Coordinates: 35°48′26″N 80°33′22″W
- Area: 487 acres (197 ha)
- Built: c. 1898
- Architect: Multiple
- Architectural style: Gothic Revival, Colonial Revival, Bungalow/Craftsman
- NRHP reference No.: 14000704
- Added to NRHP: September 24, 2014

Cooleemee Mill Town Historic District is a national historic district located at Cooleemee, Davie County, North Carolina. The district encompasses 433 contributing buildings, 1 contributing site, and 6 contributing structures on the original Cooleemee Cotton Mill Company property at Cooleemee. It was developed between 1898 and 1967, and includes notable examples of Gothic Revival, American Craftsman, and Colonial Revival style architecture. Notable contributing resources include the mill houses of 12 house types, Cooleemee Cotton Mill complex, Pest House and the company farm, Friendship Baptist Church (c. 1905), North Cooleemee Elementary School (1952), Church of the Good Shepherd (1925), Cooleemee United Methodist Church (1932), First Baptist Church of Cooleemee (1949), Cooleemee Recreation Center Bathhouse (1949), “The Holler,” and “Riverside Park,” also known as “Park Hill.”

It was added to the National Register of Historic Places in 2014.
