= Salisbury Street Historic District =

Historic district in North Carolina, United States

- U.S. National Register of Historic Places
- U.S. Historic district
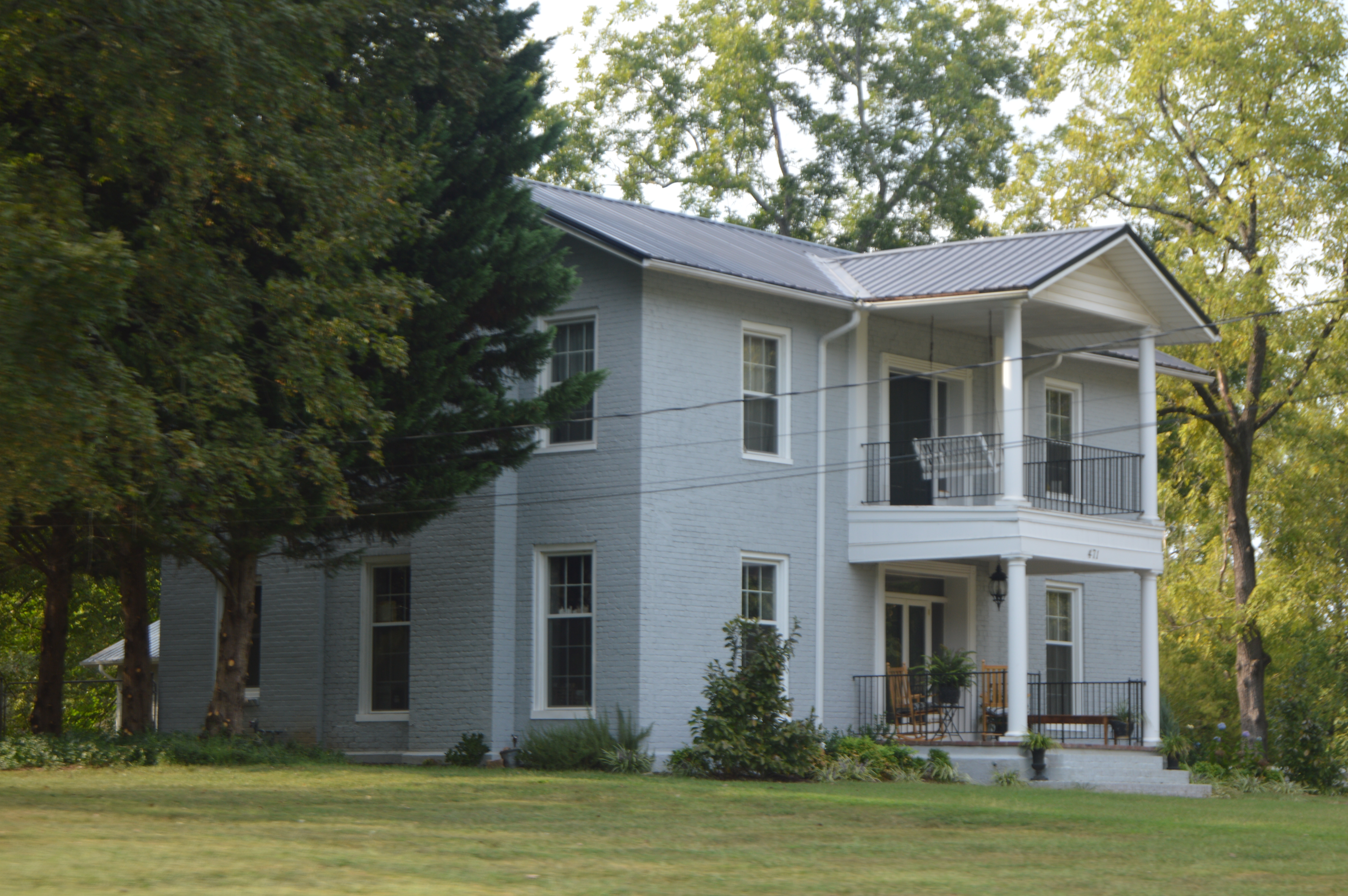
- The Harbin-Long House, 471 S. Salisbury

- Location within North Carolina Location within the United States
- Location: Roughly Salisbury St. from Kelly St. to Lexington Rd., Mocksville, North Carolina
- Coordinates: 35°53′23″N 80°33′54″W
- Area: 17 acres (6.9 ha)
- Built: c. 1836
- Architect: James and Samuel Call
- Architectural style: Greek Revival, Queen Anne, Italianate, Craftsman
- NRHP reference No.: 90000819
- Added to NRHP: June 1, 1990

Salisbury Street Historic District is a national historic district located at Mocksville, Davie County, North Carolina. The district encompasses 40 contributing buildings in a predominantly residential section of Mocksville. It was developed between the 1820s and World War II and includes notable examples of Greek Revival, Italianate, Queen Anne, and American Craftsman style residential architecture. The dwellings are predominantly one- and two-story log and frame houses. Also in the district is the (former) Mocksville Academy (c. 1828).

It was added to the National Register of Historic Places in 1990.
