= Cooleemee =

Historic house in North Carolina, United States

- U.S. National Register of Historic Places
- U.S. National Historic Landmark
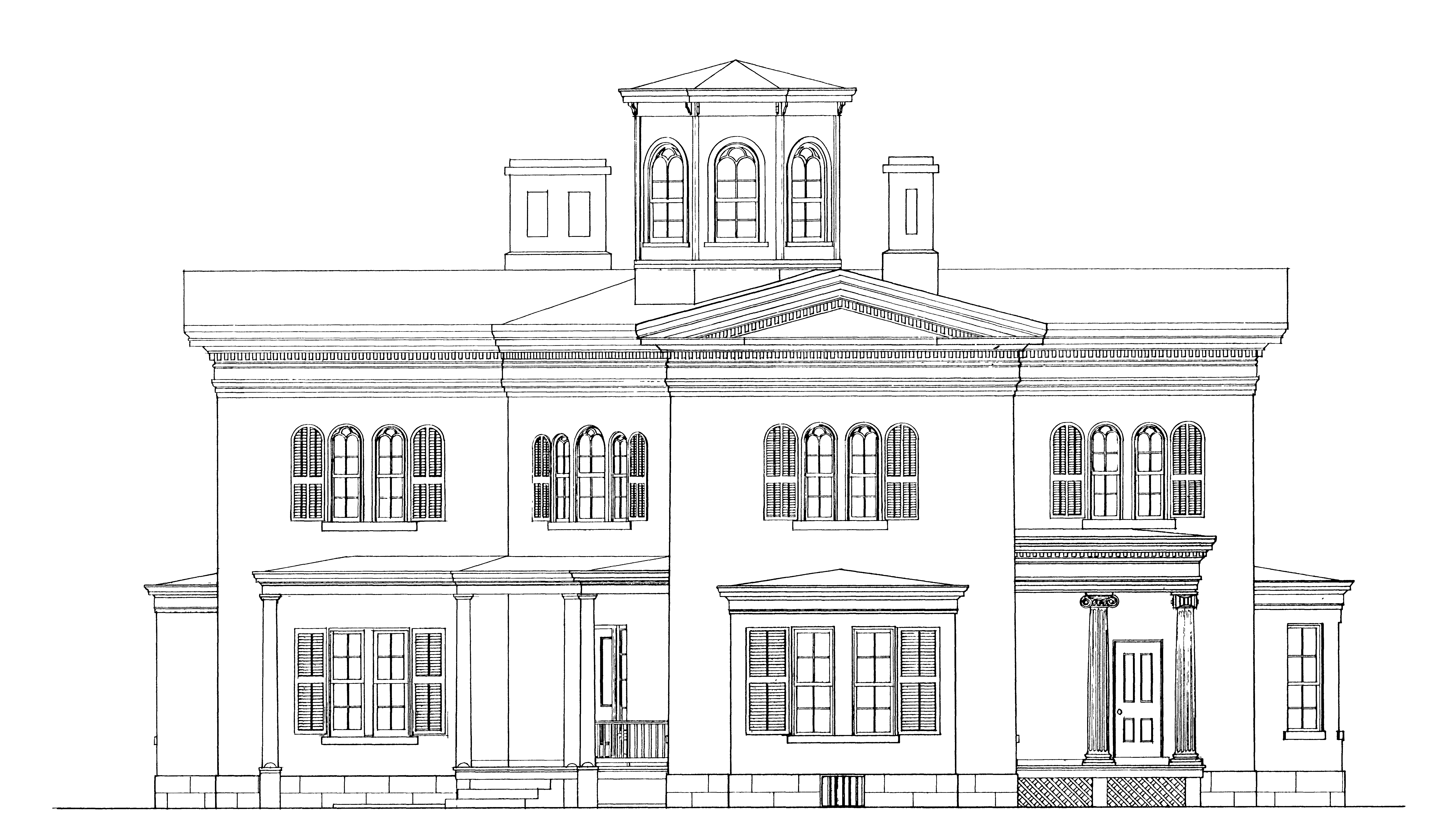
- Cooleemee drawing from 1963

- Location within North Carolina Location within the United States
- Location: Terminus of SR 1812, Mocksville, North Carolina
- Coordinates: 35.8534°N 80.4100°W
- Built: 1853–1855
- Architect: William H. Ranlett
- Architectural style: Anglo-Grecian villa
- NRHP reference No.: 73001334

Significant dates
- Added to NRHP: March 20, 1973
- Designated NHL: June 2, 1978

Cooleemee (/ˈkuːlɪmiː/), also known as the Cooleemee Plantation House, is a house located between Mocksville and Lexington, North Carolina, at the terminus of SR 1812 (Peter Hairston Rd.) on the Yadkin River in Davie County, North Carolina. It is a U.S. National Historic Landmark, designated in 1978 for its architecture.

== History ==
The house's floor plan in the shape of a Greek cross, with four equal wings extending from an octagonal core, is based on a published design by William H. Ranlett, The Architect (New York) 1847, Vol. I, Plate 32, published again in Godey's Lady's Book, January 1850; the Godey's Lady's Book engravings were framed and kept in the house. The house is an "Anglo-Grecian Villa", built in the shape of a Greek cross between 1853 and 1855 by Peter and Columbia Stuart Hairston. The builder Peter Wilson Hairston a white Superior Court judge in North Carolina, who had inherited Cooleemee from his grandfather, was a central figure in Henry Wiencek's telling of the family's story.

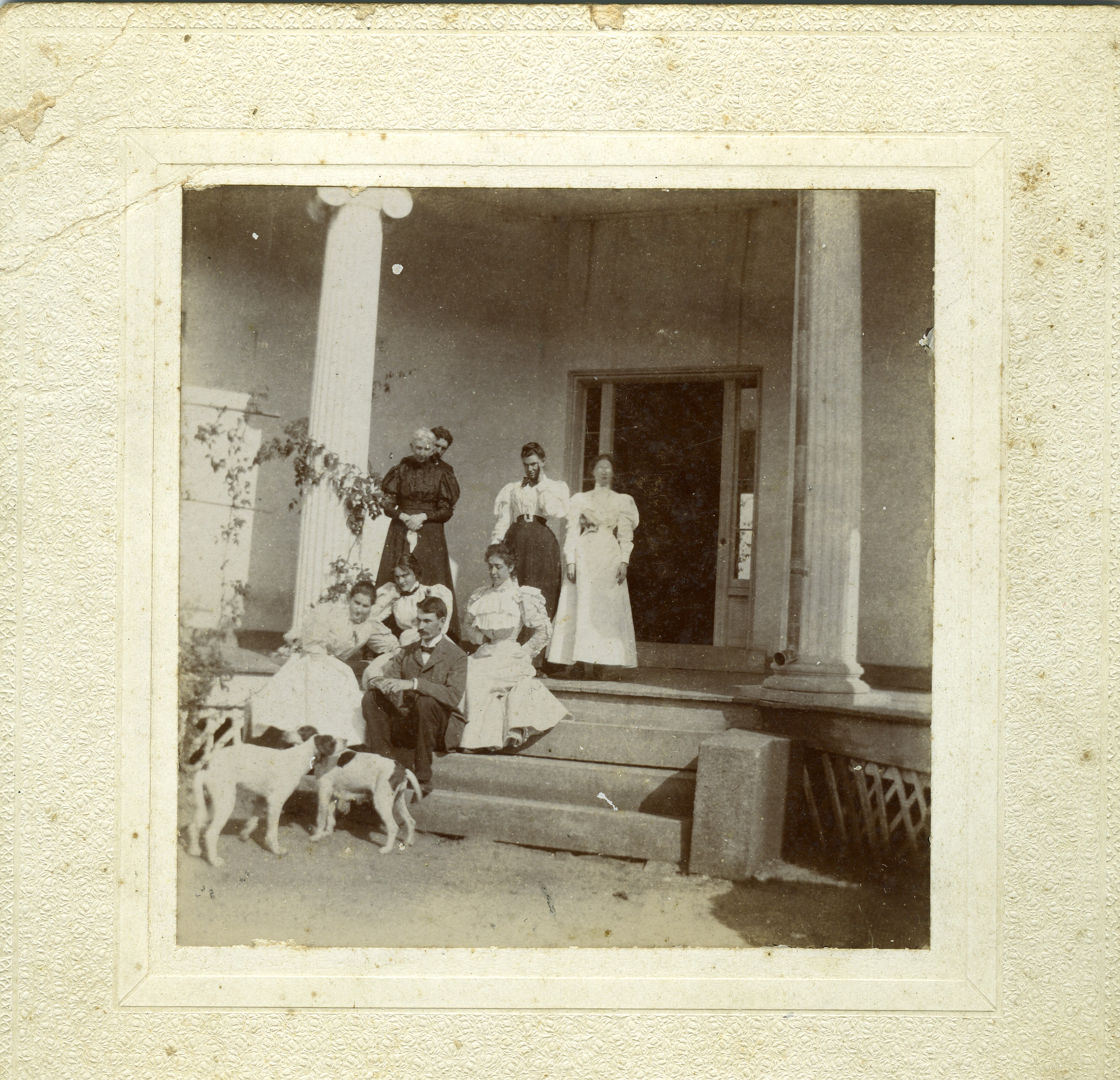
Members of the Hairston family and friends seated in front of the house in 1893

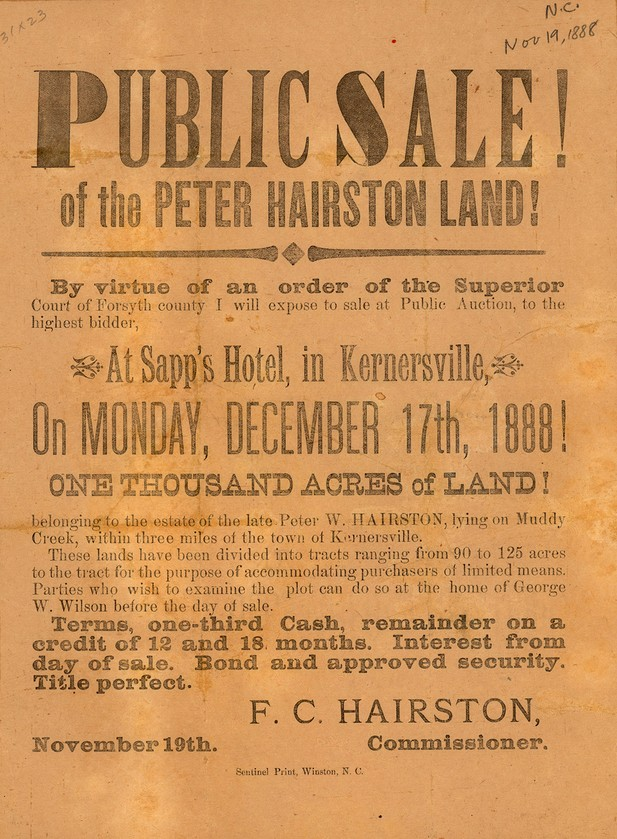
Public sale of Hairston lands, Forsyth County, North Carolina, 1888

The house is built from approximately 300,000 bricks made on site. Cooleemee Plantation was founded by Colonel Jesse A. Pearson who took part in the capture of approximately 600 tribal Creek Indians during the War of 1812. The Indians known as "Kulimi", a tribe of the Creek nation, were from the village of "Cooleeme" near the junction of the Coosa and Tallapoosa Rivers. The Creek word means "the place where the white oaks grow". Upon his return in 1814, he named his existing plantation "Cooleemee Hill". In 1817, a veteran of the American Revolutionary War and four-time state legislator, Peter Hairston, purchased the 2,500-acre (10 km^{2}) Cooleemee Hill Plantation for $8 per acre – $20,000 total. In addition to the plantation house, in 1860 there were twenty-three slave dwellings at Cooleemee. The principal crop at Cooleemee was tobacco.

In 1997, the Hairston family, who still owned the house, donated a conservation easement to The LandTrust for Central North Carolina, which helped preserve the house and property against development. At that time, the plantation included 1,900 acres (7.7 km^{2}) of farmland (down from 4,200 acres (17 km^{2}) at its peak), surrounded by a two-mile (3 km) stretch of the Yadkin River supporting more than 200 species of bird.

Cooleemee Plantation was declared a National Historic Landmark in 1978.

== Family ==
In 1999, Henry Wiencek published The Hairstons: An American Family In Black And White, which told the story of the Hairston family, which continues to own Cooleemee, and of the plantation and its history over the past 150 years. This family, with black and white branches due to slavery, have continued to hold reunions at Cooleemee that honor their family's history and roots in the region. Wiencek, in the course of his preparation for this book, witnessed what he considered to be extraordinary interactions between members of the Hairston Family. In the course of his research, Wiencek learned that the Hairstons were not only the largest slaveholding family in the South, but also slave traders.

Peter Wilson Hairston, the latest Hairston to own the property at the end of the 20th century, published a book in 1986 recounting the history of the family's enslaved people, which helped other research into the family and the property. Hairston died in February 2007 in the same bed in which he was born.

== Archaeology ==
About 175 arrowheads that were found on the western side of the Yadkin River at Cooleemee Plantation were classified by Dr. Joffre L. Coe of the University of North Carolina, and Dr. James Bingham, former President of the North Carolina Archaeological Society. The arrowheads, which were from different peoples and of different times, were dated from approximately 7000 BCE to the 18th century. Several specimens exist which date from 8000 to 8500 years old with the oldest, a Hardaway Point, being dated at 9000 years old.

== See also ==
- Beaver Creek Plantation
- List of National Historic Landmarks in North Carolina
- National Register of Historic Places listings in Davie County, North Carolina
