= George E. Barnhardt House =

Historic house in North Carolina, United States

- U.S. National Register of Historic Places
- Location within North Carolina Location within the United States
- Location: 291 Hartley Road, near Mocksville, North Carolina
- Coordinates: 35°49′19″N 80°29′02″W
- Area: 21 acres (8.5 ha)
- Built: c. 1880
- Architectural style: I-house
- NRHP reference No.: 09000289
- Added to NRHP: May 4, 2009

George E. Barnhardt House is a historic house located near Mocksville, Davie County, North Carolina. It is locally significant as a rare surviving example of a post-American Civil War brick farmhouse in Davie County.

== Description and history ==
It was built about 1880, and is a two-story, three-bay, brick I-house with a two-story rear ell. It features a center-bay, two-tier, pedimented, front-gable porch supported by thin square posts. The rear ell and attached shed porch retain a 5-V metal roof. A small, frame one-story, gabled addition with weatherboard siding has recently been added to the west side of the rear ell.

It was added to the National Register of Historic Places on May 4, 2009.
