= Cana Store and Post Office =

- U.S. National Register of Historic Places
- Location within North Carolina Location within the United States
- Location: NC 1411, 0.2 mi. N of NC 1406, near Mocksville, North Carolina
- Coordinates: 35°58′24″N 80°34′38″W
- Area: less than one acre
- Built: c. 1875, 1930s
- Built by: Cain, James Harrison
- NRHP reference No.: 01001073
- Added to NRHP: October 5, 2001

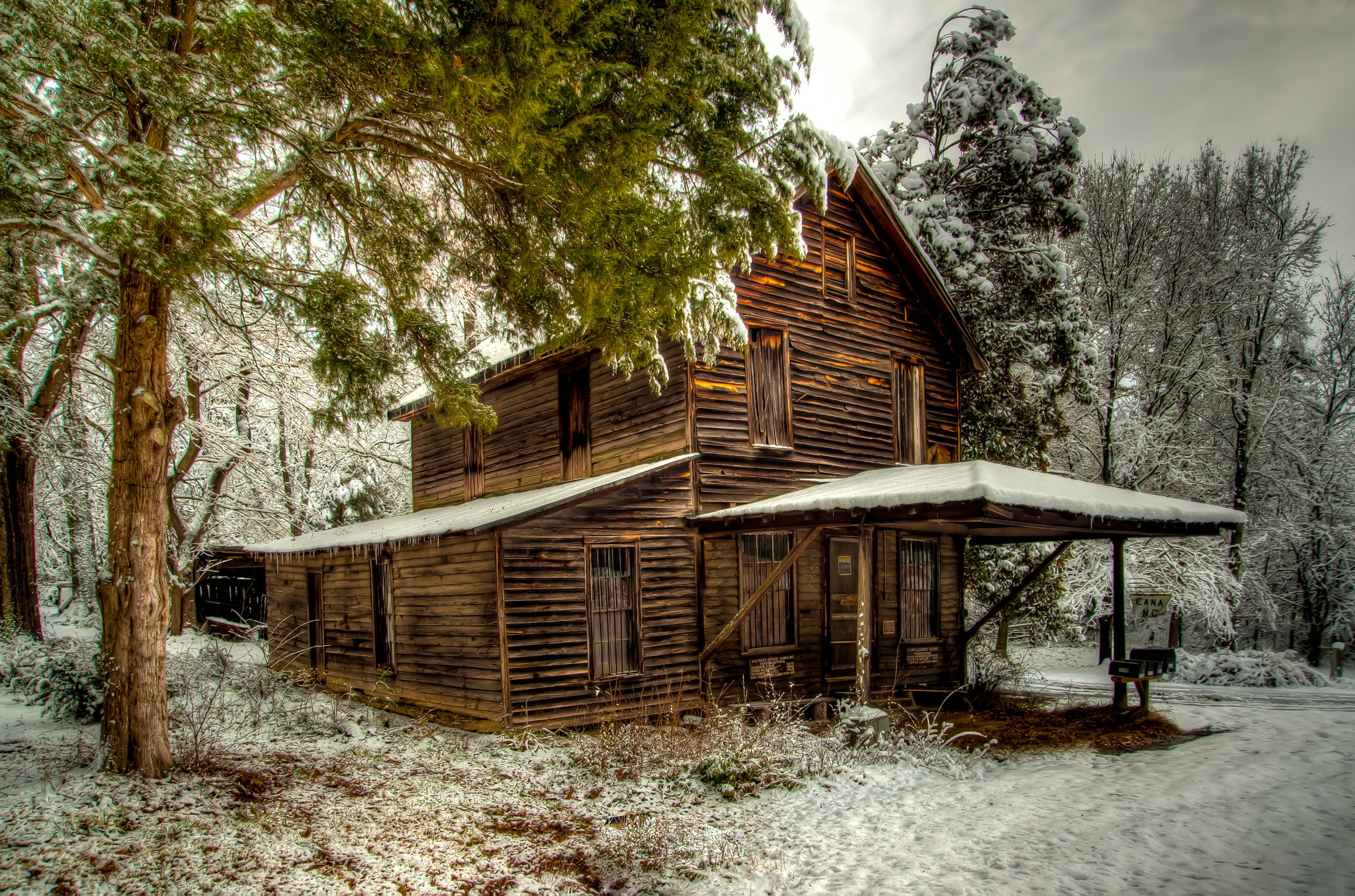

Cana Store and Post Office is a historic general store and post office building located near Mocksville, Davie County, North Carolina. It was built about 1875, and is a two-story, three-bay, frame building with a gable roof. The front facade features a broad hip-roofed frame canopy added in the 1930s that serves as a porte-cochere. Also on the property is a contributing one-story woodshed built in the 1930s. The building housed a post office until 1954 and a general store until 1965.

It was added to the National Register of Historic Places in 2001.
