= Cooleemee, North Carolina =

Town in the United States

- Town
- Seal

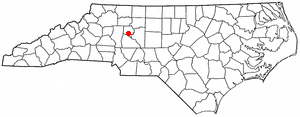
- Location of Cooleemee, North Carolina
- Coordinates: 35°48′45″N 80°33′23″W
- Country: United States
- State: North Carolina
- County: Davie

Government
  - Mayor: Jeff Smith

Area
  - Total: 0.77 sq mi (2.00 km^{2})
  - Land: 0.75 sq mi (1.95 km^{2})
  - Water: 0.019 sq mi (0.05 km^{2})
- Elevation: 725 ft (221 m)

Population (2020)
  - Total: 940
  - Density: 1,249.5/sq mi (482.42/km^{2})
- Time zone: UTC-5 (Eastern (EST))
  - Summer (DST): UTC-4 (EDT)
- ZIP code: 27014
- Area code: 336
- FIPS code: 37-14460
- GNIS feature ID: 2406308
- Website: Town of Cooleemee Official website

Cooleemee (/ˈkuːləmi/ KOO-lə-mee) is a town in Davie County, North Carolina, United States. The population was 940 at the 2020 census.

== History ==
Cooleemee Mill Town Historic District and the Foard-Tatum House are listed on the National Register of Historic Places.

== Geography ==
According to the United States Census Bureau, the town has a total area of 0.8 square miles (2.1 km^{2}), all land.

== Demographics ==
Historical population
Census	Pop.	Note	%±
1990	971		—
2000	905		−6.8%
2010	960		6.1%
2020	940		−2.1%
U.S. Decennial Census

=== 2020 census ===
Cooleemee racial composition
Race	Number	Percentage
White (non-Hispanic)	687	73.09%
Black or African American (non-Hispanic)	84	8.94%
Native American	1	0.11%
Asian	2	0.21%
Other/Mixed	86	9.15%
Hispanic or Latino	80	8.51%

As of the 2020 United States census, there were 940 people, 379 households, and 270 families residing in the town.

=== 2000 census ===
As of the census of 2000, there were 905 people, 400 households, and 254 families residing in the town. The population density was 1,166.6 inhabitants per square mile (450.4/km^{2}). There were 456 housing units at an average density of 587.8 per square mile (227.0/km^{2}). The racial makeup of the town was 91.71% White, 5.41% African American, 0.33% Native American, 1.10% from other races, and 1.44% from two or more races. Hispanic or Latino of any race were 4.09% of the population.

There were 400 households, out of which 25.5% had children under the age of 18 living with them, 49.3% were married couples living together, 8.5% had a female householder with no husband present, and 36.5% were non-families. 32.8% of all households were made up of individuals, and 18.3% had someone living alone who was 65 years of age or older. The average household size was 2.26 and the average family size was 2.85.

In the town, the population was spread out, with 22.0% under the age of 18, 7.4% from 18 to 24, 26.7% from 25 to 44, 22.7% from 45 to 64, and 21.2% who were 65 years of age or older. The median age was 40 years. For every 100 females, there were 103.8 males. For every 100 females age 18 and over, there were 97.2 males.

The median income for a household in the town was $29,833, and the median income for a family was $37,875. Males had a median income of $26,705 versus $20,813 for females. The per capita income for the town was $17,148. About 9.6% of families and 12.4% of the population were below the poverty line, including 18.6% of those under age 18 and 8.2% of those age 65 or over.

== Notable people ==
- Jack Crouch, baseball player
- Zeb Eaton, baseball player
- Buck Jordan, baseball player
- Lynn Wells Rumley, former mayor and historian

== See also ==
- Cooleemee, an homonymous estate
