= Davie County Jail =

Historic former jail in North Carolina, US

- U.S. National Register of Historic Places
- Location within North Carolina Location within the United States
- Location: 284 S. Main St., Mocksville, North Carolina
- Coordinates: 35°53′35″N 80°33′39″W
- Area: 1 acre (0.40 ha)
- Built: 1839
- Built by: Austin, Henry R.
- NRHP reference No.: 73001335
- Added to NRHP: April 24, 1973

Davie County Jail is a historic county jail located at Mocksville, Davie County, North Carolina. It was built in 1839, and is a two-story, three-bay, brick building with a gable roof. It was used as a jail until 1909, then renovated for residential use.

It was added to the National Register of Historic Places in 1973.
