= Le Vega Clements House =

- U.S. National Register of Historic Places
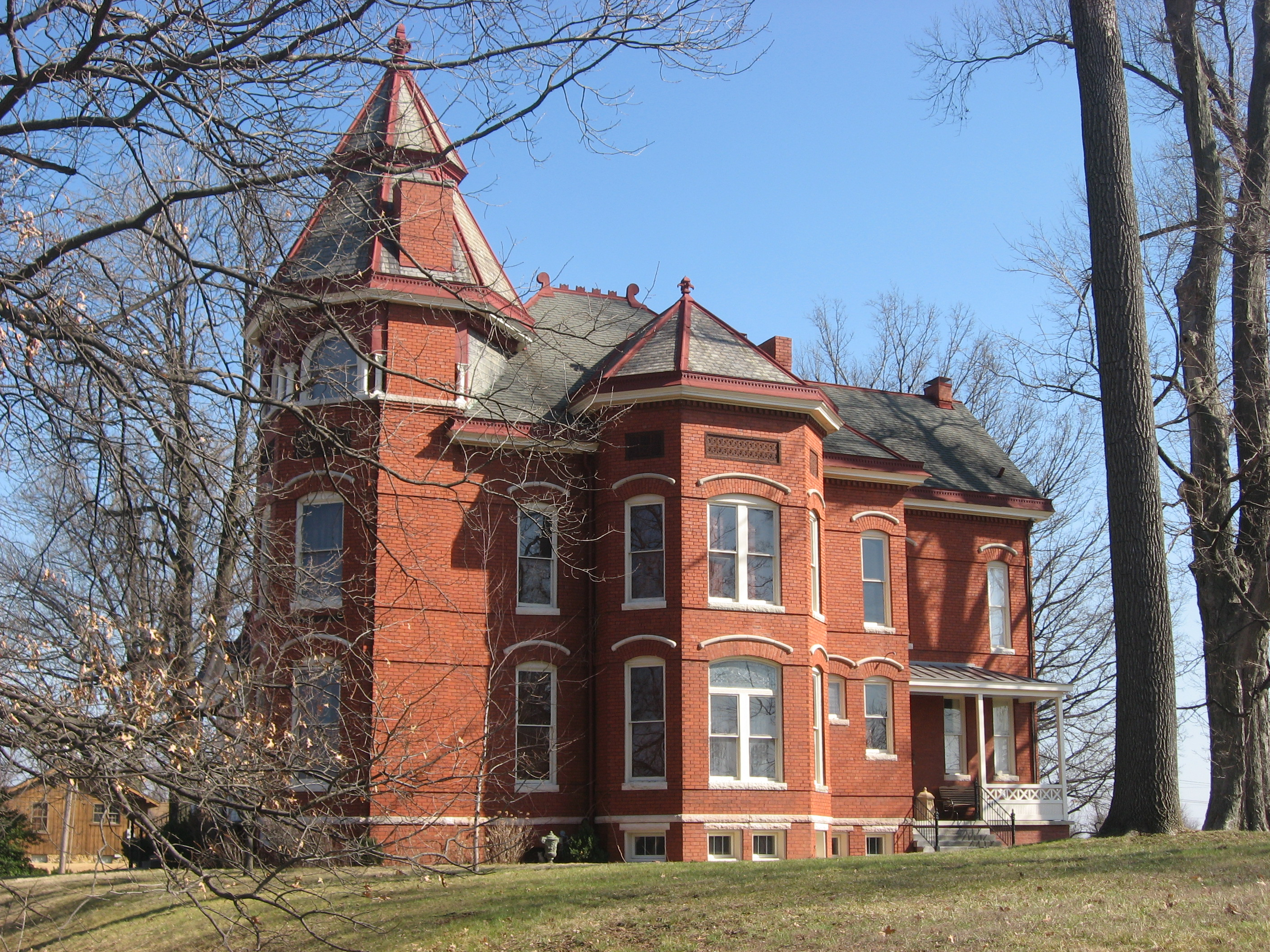

- Location within Kentucky Location within the United States
- Location: 1500 N. Highland Ave., Owensboro, Kentucky
- Coordinates: 37°46′27″N 87°05′31″W
- Area: 0.6 acres (0.24 ha)
- Built: 1894
- Architectural style: Queen Anne
- MPS: Owensboro MRA
- NRHP reference No.: 86000663
- Added to NRHP: March 28, 1986

Le Vega Clements House, at 1500 N. Highland Ave. in Owensboro, Kentucky, was built in 1894. It was listed on the National Register of Historic Places in 1986.

It is a two-story, double-pile brick house, with a projecting three-story hexagonal tower. It is Queen Anne in style.

It was deemed notable as "the finest examples of Queen Anne domestic architecture in Owensboro. The house, called Highlands by its builder, Sylvester Monarch, is appropriately named because of its commanding position on a hill overlooking the Ohio River. The house and yard cover an entire block."
