= Downtown Mocksville Historic District =

Historic district in North Carolina, United States

- U.S. National Register of Historic Places
- U.S. Historic district
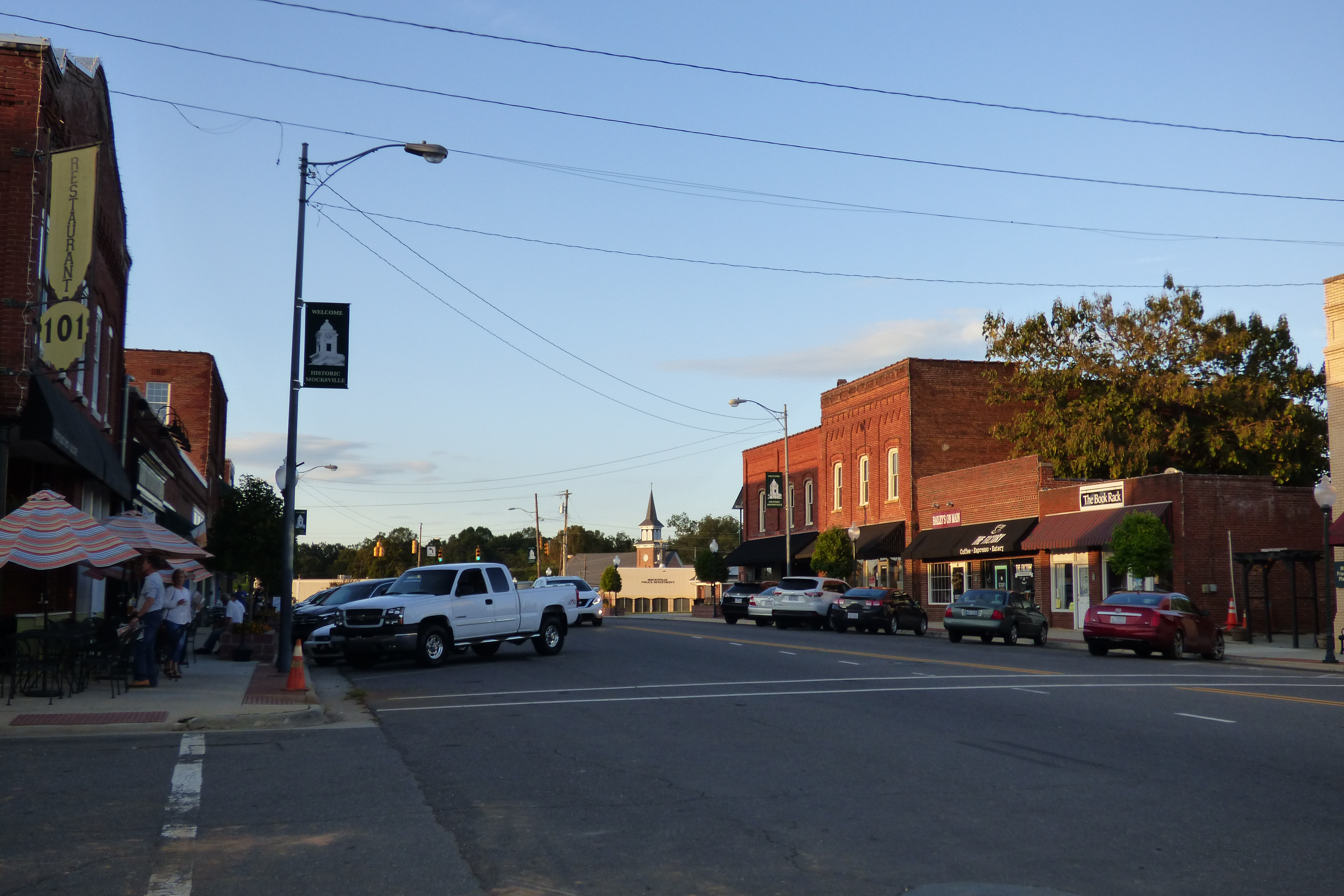

- Location within North Carolina Location within the United States
- Location: Roughly Main St. from Water to Gaither Sts., including Town Square, Mocksville, North Carolina
- Coordinates: 35°53′39″N 80°33′43″W
- Area: 6 acres (2.4 ha)
- Built: c. 1909
- Architect: Multiple
- Architectural style: Classical Revival, Beaux Arts, Vernacular Commercial
- NRHP reference No.: 90000821
- Added to NRHP: June 1, 1990

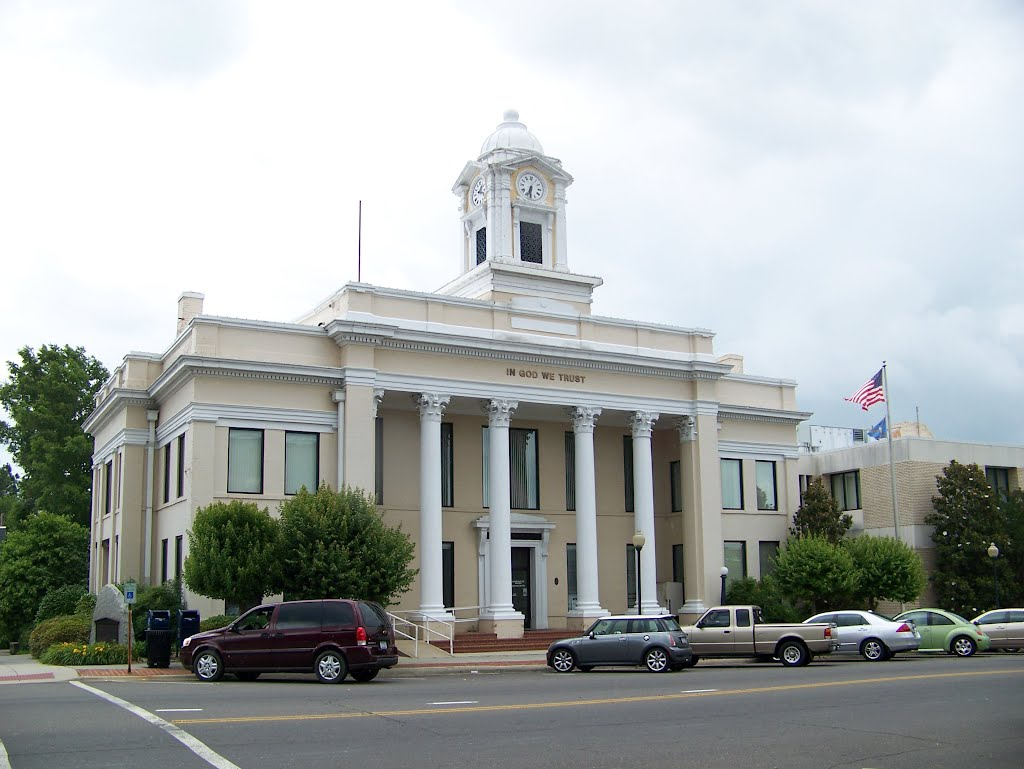
Davie County Courthouse, 2012

Downtown Mocksville Historic District is a national historic district located at Mocksville, Davie County, North Carolina. The district encompasses 21 contributing buildings and 1 contributing object in the central business district of Mocksville. It primarily includes residential and commercial buildings with notable examples of Classical Revival and Beaux-Arts style architecture. The district includes the previously listed Davie County Courthouse. Other notable buildings include the Davie County Jail (1916), (former) C. C. Sanford Sons Store (1937), (former) J. T. Baity/Anderson Store (1906, 1915), (former) Meroney Hardware Company Building (1922-1924), Sanford Brothers Building (1927), (former) Southern Bank &. Trust Company Building (1923), (former) Princess Theatre, J. T. Angell Building (1910), Horn Service Station, (former) Kurfees and Ward Pure Oil Station, (former) Meroney Filling Station, and Johnstone Office Building (1939).

It was added to the National Register of Historic Places in 1990.
