= McGuire-Setzer House =

Historic house in North Carolina, United States

- U.S. National Register of Historic Places
- Location within North Carolina Location within the United States
- Nearest city: NC 1139 0.2 miles S of Mocksville town limits, near Mocksville, North Carolina
- Coordinates: 35°52′49″N 80°34′15″W
- Area: 1.8 acres (0.73 ha)
- Built: c. 1825, c. 1835
- Architectural style: Federal, Vernacular late Federal
- NRHP reference No.: 92001152
- Added to NRHP: September 4, 1992

McGuire-Setzer House is a historic home located near Mocksville, Davie County, North Carolina. The original section of the double-pen log building was built about 1825, with a frame section added about 1835. The dwelling is sheathed in weatherboard and is in a vernacular Federal style. It features gable end brick chimneys and rests on a stone foundation. Also on the property is a contributing kitchen building.

It was added to the National Register of Historic Places in 1992.
