= Hodges Business College =

Historic school building in North Carolina, United States

- U.S. National Register of Historic Places
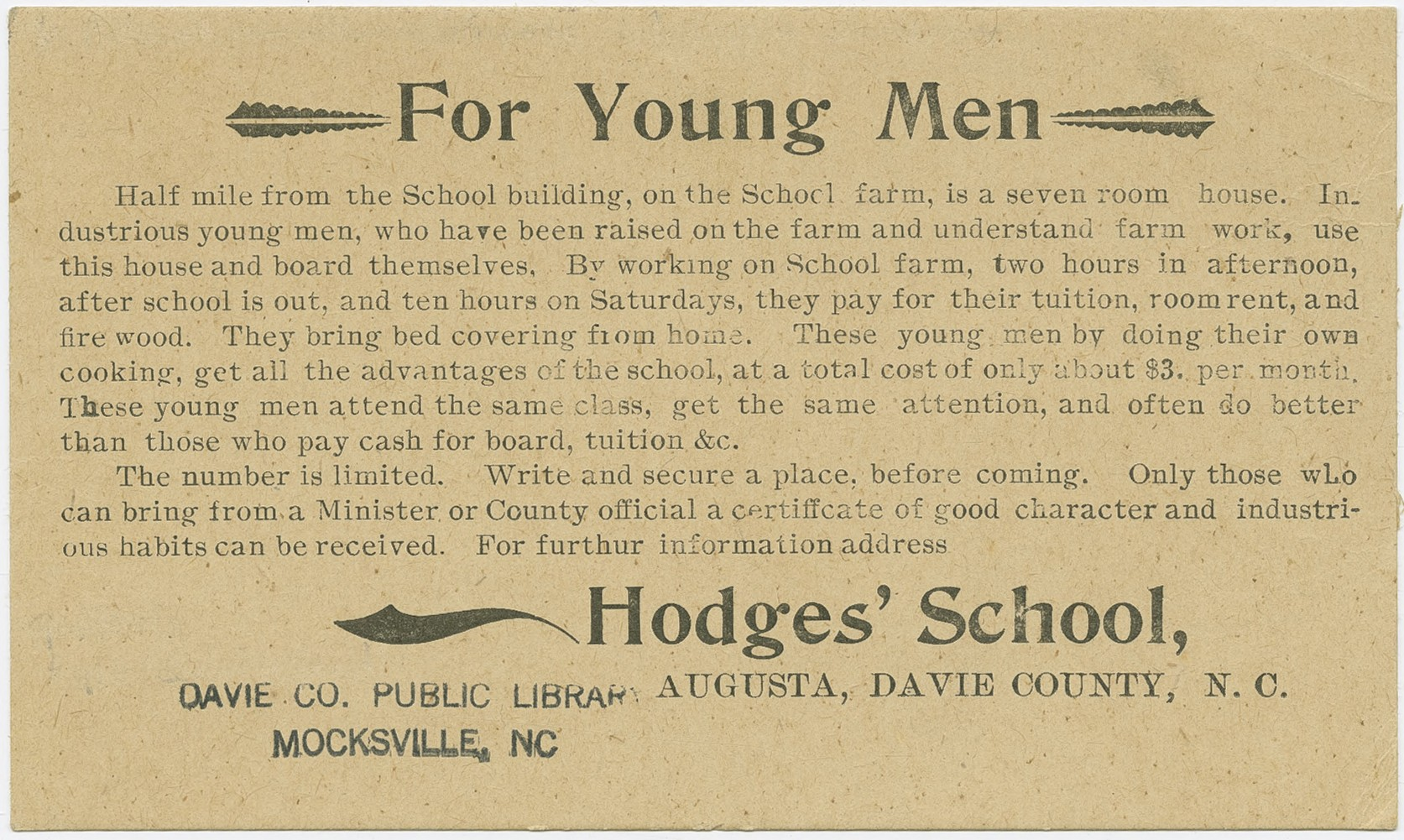
- An advertisement for the Hodges School's boarding program.

- Location within North Carolina
- Location: NC 1819, 0.15 mi. SE of jct. with NC 801, near Mocksville, North Carolina
- Coordinates: 35°50′20″N 80°30′14″W
- Area: less than one acre
- Built: 1894
- Architectural style: Gothic Revival
- NRHP reference No.: 00000990
- Added to NRHP: August 16, 2000

Hodges Business College, also known as Hodges School, is a historic school building located near Mocksville, Davie County, North Carolina. It was built in 1894, and is a two-story, rectangular, Gothic Revival-style brick building. It features multiple Gothic-arched window openings and front entrance. The building housed a school into the 1910s, then was converted to tenant house, and after 1936 used for storage. The building was converted to a residence in the 1990s.

It was added to the National Register of Historic Places in 2000.
