= Farmington, North Carolina =

- Census-designated place
- Location within the state of North Carolina
- Coordinates: 36°00′46″N 80°31′58″W
- Country: United States
- State: North Carolina
- County: Davie County

Area
  - Total: 1.66 sq mi (4.29 km^{2})
  - Land: 1.63 sq mi (4.21 km^{2})
  - Water: 0.035 sq mi (0.09 km^{2})
- Elevation: 791 ft (241 m)

Population (2020)
  - Total: 291
  - Density: 179/sq mi (69.2/km^{2})
- Time zone: UTC-5 (Eastern (EST))
  - Summer (DST): UTC-4 (EDT)
- ZIP code: 27028
- Area code: 336
- GNIS feature ID: 2812790

Farmington is an unincorporated community and census-designated place (CDP) in Davie County, North Carolina, United States, located at the intersection of NC 801 and Farmington Road (SR 1410). It was first listed as a CDP in the 2020 census with a population of 291. Located nearby is the Farmington Dragway.

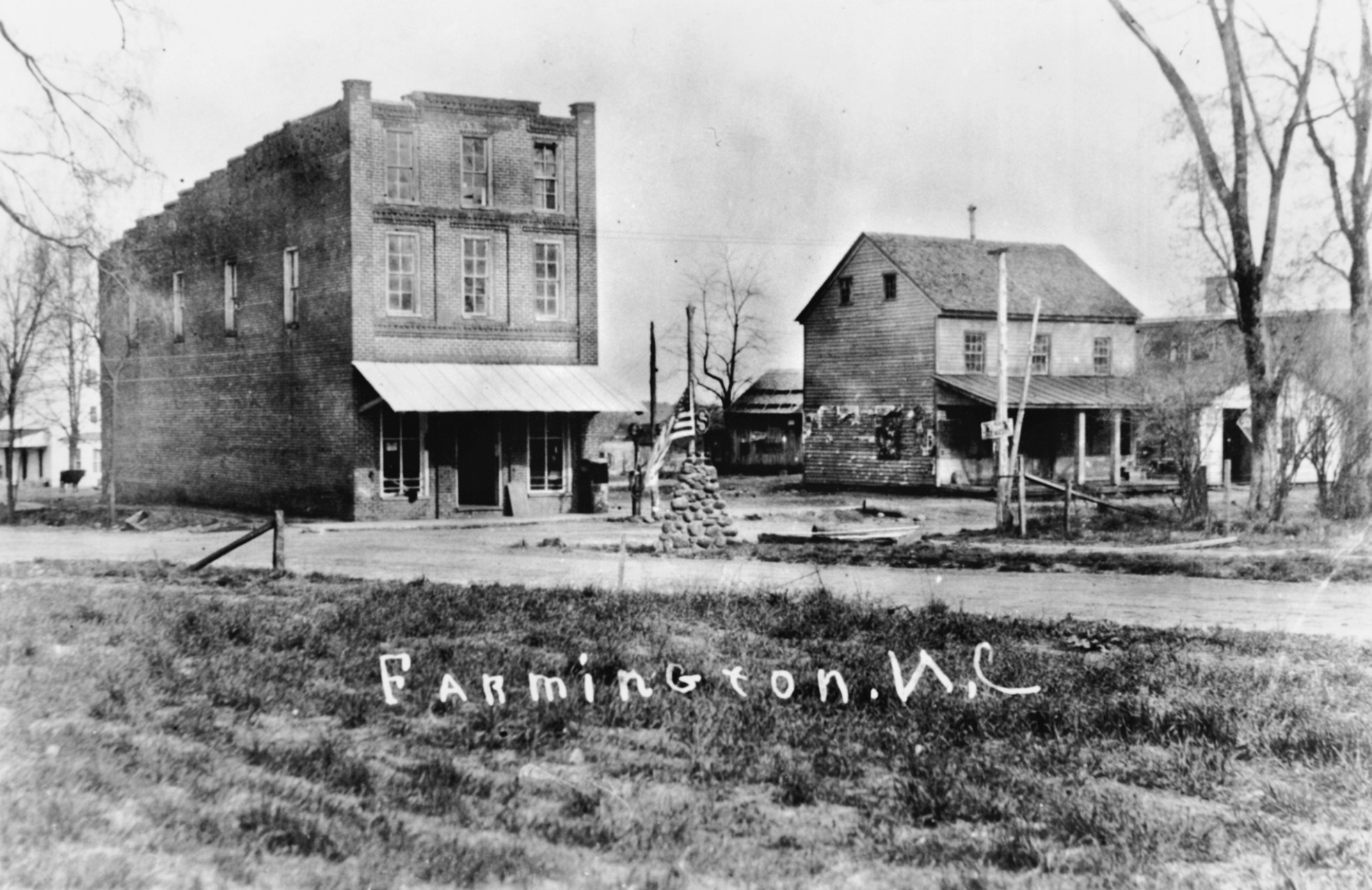
An image of Farmington in the 1880s

== Demographics ==
Historical population
Census	Pop.	Note	%±
2020	291		—
U.S. Decennial Census; 2020

=== 2020 census ===
Farmington CDP, North Carolina - Demographic Profile (NH = Non-Hispanic)
Race / Ethnicity	Pop 2020	% 2020
White alone (NH)	280	96.22%
Black or African American alone (NH)	0	0.00%
Native American or Alaska Native alone (NH)	0	0.00%
Asian alone (NH)	0	0.00%
Pacific Islander alone (NH)	0	0.00%
Some Other Race alone (NH)	1	0.34%
Mixed Race/Multi-Racial (NH)	5	1.72%
Hispanic or Latino (any race)	5	1.72%
Total	291	100.00%

Note: the US Census treats Hispanic/Latino as an ethnic category. This table excludes Latinos from the racial categories and assigns them to a separate category. Hispanics/Latinos can be of any race.
