= Foard-Tatum House =

Historic house in North Carolina, United States

- U.S. National Register of Historic Places
- Location within North Carolina Location within the United States
- Location: At end of NC 1101, near Cooleemee, North Carolina
- Coordinates: 35°47′35″N 80°31′21″W
- Area: 6 acres (2.4 ha)
- Built: c. 1845
- Architectural style: Federal, Greek Revival, Log
- NRHP reference No.: 94000530
- Added to NRHP: May 26, 1994

Foard-Tatum House is a historic plantation house located near Cooleemee, Davie County, North Carolina. It was built about 1845, and is a two-story, three-bay, timber frame dwelling in a transitional Federal /Greek Revival style. The interior is in the style of Asher Benjamin and a rear ell was added in the 1860s or 1870s. Also on the property are the contributing log smokehouse and corn crib.

It was added to the National Register of Historic Places in 1994.
