= Win-Mock Farm Dairy =

- U.S. National Register of Historic Places
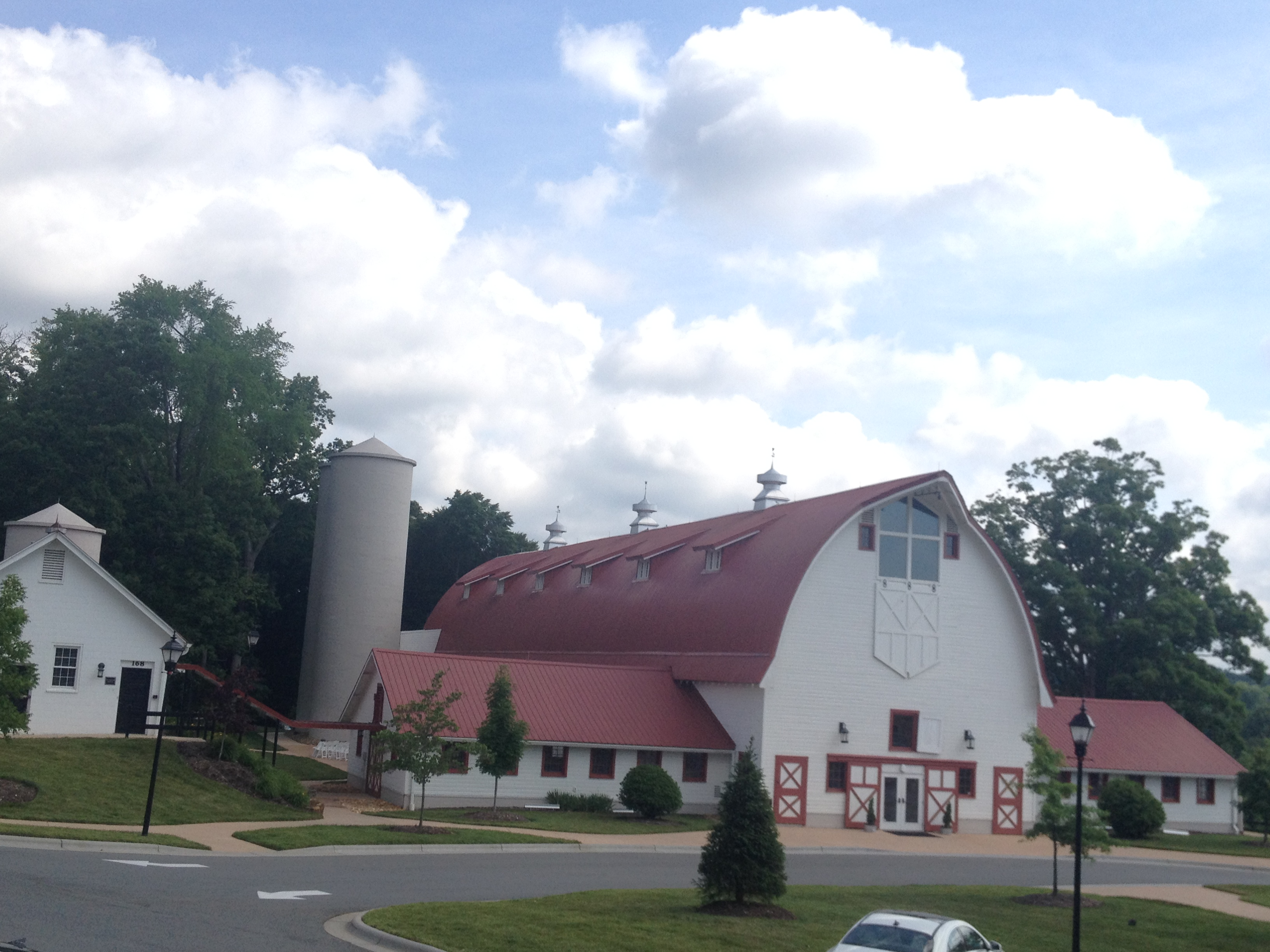

- Location within North Carolina Location within the United States
- Location: 168 E. Kinderton Way, Bermuda Run, North Carolina
- Coordinates: 36°00′45″N 80°25′25″W
- Area: 4.6 acres (1.9 ha)
- Built: c. 1930
- Architect: Multiple
- Website: Winmock
- NRHP reference No.: 10001057
- Added to NRHP: December 27, 2010

Win-Mock Farm Dairy is a historic dairy complex located at Bermuda Run, Davie County, North Carolina, USA. The complex was built about 1930 and includes a dairy barn, bottling plant, granary, cistern and water trough. The barn is a two-story frame building that measures 38 feet, 3 inches, in width by 180 feet in length. It has a concrete foundation, wood German-siding and a Gothic arch roof.

It was added to the National Register of Historic Places in 2010. In 2010, Sterling Events Group took ownership of the vacant property and set forth on an extensive restoration plan to breathe new life into it. In the following year, WinMock opened its freshly painted doors as a new place to hold events. It retains the authentic craftsmanship of the original building, now fitted with the convenience and impact of modern technology. The property's name came from its central location between Winston-Salem and Mocksville, North Carolina. The barn has a cavernous loft originally designed to hold over 7,000 bales of hay.
