= George S. Clement House =

Historic house in Ohio, United States

- U.S. National Register of Historic Places
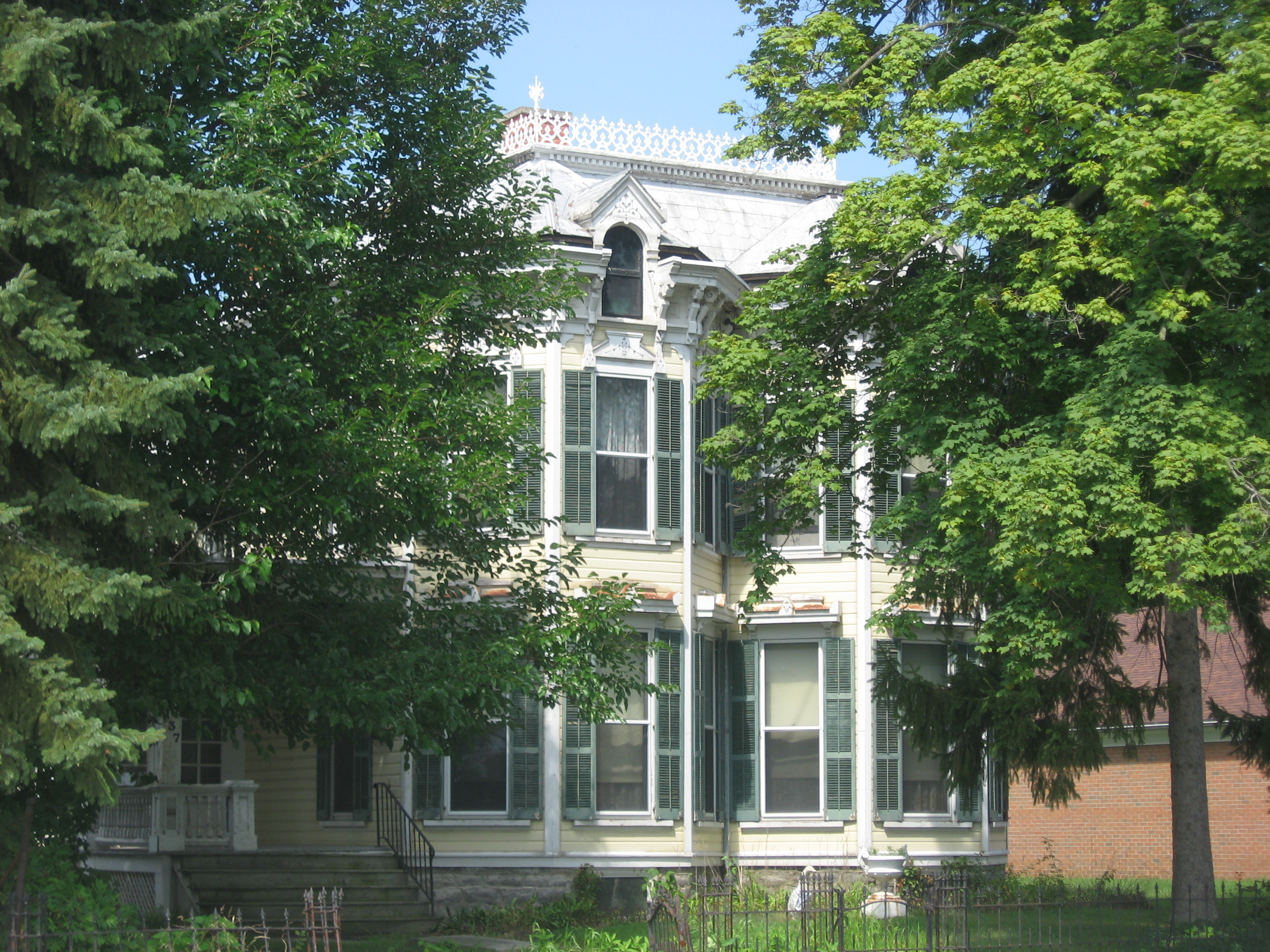
- Front of the house

- Location within Ohio Location within the United States
- Location: 137 Clinton St., Wauseon, Ohio
- Coordinates: 41°32′57″N 84°8′35″W
- Area: less than one acre
- Built: 1872
- Architectural style: Italianate
- NRHP reference No.: 83001973
- Added to NRHP: April 21, 1983

The George S. Clement House (also known as the "Davies House") is a historic building in Wauseon, Ohio, United States. Built in 1872, it has been named a fine example of the High Victorian form of the Italianate style of architecture.

George S. Clement moved to Wauseon in 1864, only one decade after the community was established. His hard manner of conducting business relations caused him soon to become one of the city's leading businessmen, and less than a decade after moving to Wauseon, he built a glorious house north of the city's downtown. Its walls are primarily weatherboard, although decorated with stone elements; the roof is made of slates; and details around the house include elements of wood and of iron. The two-story house is primarily frame, and its slate roof is a mansard. His house on Clinton Street completed, Clement remained deeply involved in the business affairs of Wauseon. In 1889, Clement participated in the founding of the Wauseon State Bank, and on its board of directors he sat until the end of his life.

In 1983, Clement's house was listed on the National Register of Historic Places, qualifying for the Register for two different reasons — its high-quality Italianate architecture and its connection to George S. Clement during his time as a leading member of the community. Included in the landmarked area was a second building, a carriage house on the property's southwestern corner.
