= Fulton United Methodist Church =

Historic church in North Carolina, United States

- Fulton Methodist Church
- U.S. National Register of Historic Places
- Location within North Carolina Location within the United States
- Location: S of Advance off NC 801, near Advance, North Carolina
- Coordinates: 35°53′9″N 80°25′8″W
- Area: 1 acre (0.40 ha)
- Built: 1888
- Architectural style: Gothic, Italianate
- NRHP reference No.: 79001701
- Added to NRHP: November 15, 1979

Fulton Methodist Church is a historic Methodist church located near Advance, Davie County, North Carolina. It was built in 1888, and is a one-story, brick building with vernacular Gothic Revival and Italianate design elements. It features a steeply pitched gable roof, bracket cornices, a large pointed arch window, and engaged five-stage tower.

It was added to the National Register of Historic Places in 1979.
