= Boxwood Lodge =

Historic house in North Carolina, United States

- Boxwood Estate
- U.S. National Register of Historic Places
- U.S. Historic district
- Location within North Carolina Location within the United States
- Location: 132 Becktown Rd., near Mocksville, North Carolina
- Coordinates: 35°48′46″N 80°30′45″W
- Area: 51 acres (21 ha)
- Built: 1913
- Architect: Delano & Aldrich
- Architectural style: Colonial Revival, Bungalow/craftsman
- NRHP reference No.: 95000673
- Added to NRHP: June 2, 1995

Boxwood Estate is a historic hunting retreat and national historic district located near Mocksville, Davie County, North Carolina. The district encompasses 8 contributing buildings, 1 contributing site, and 4 contributing structures on a rural estate including a manor house. It was developed between 1911 and 1931 by William Rabb Craig (1870-1931), a wealthy cotton and sugar broker. The manor house was built between 1933 and 1934, and is a two-story, "H"-plan, brick Colonial Revival dwelling designed by the architectural firm Delano & Aldrich. Other notable resources include the grounds of Boxwood Lodge, greenhouse (c. 1940), log cabin (1932-1933, 1940s), great barn (1910s), feed / grain house (c. 1940), and entrance piers (1934).

It was added to the National Register of Historic Places in 1995.
