= North Main Street Historic District (Mocksville, North Carolina) =

Historic district in North Carolina, United States

- U.S. National Register of Historic Places
- U.S. Historic district
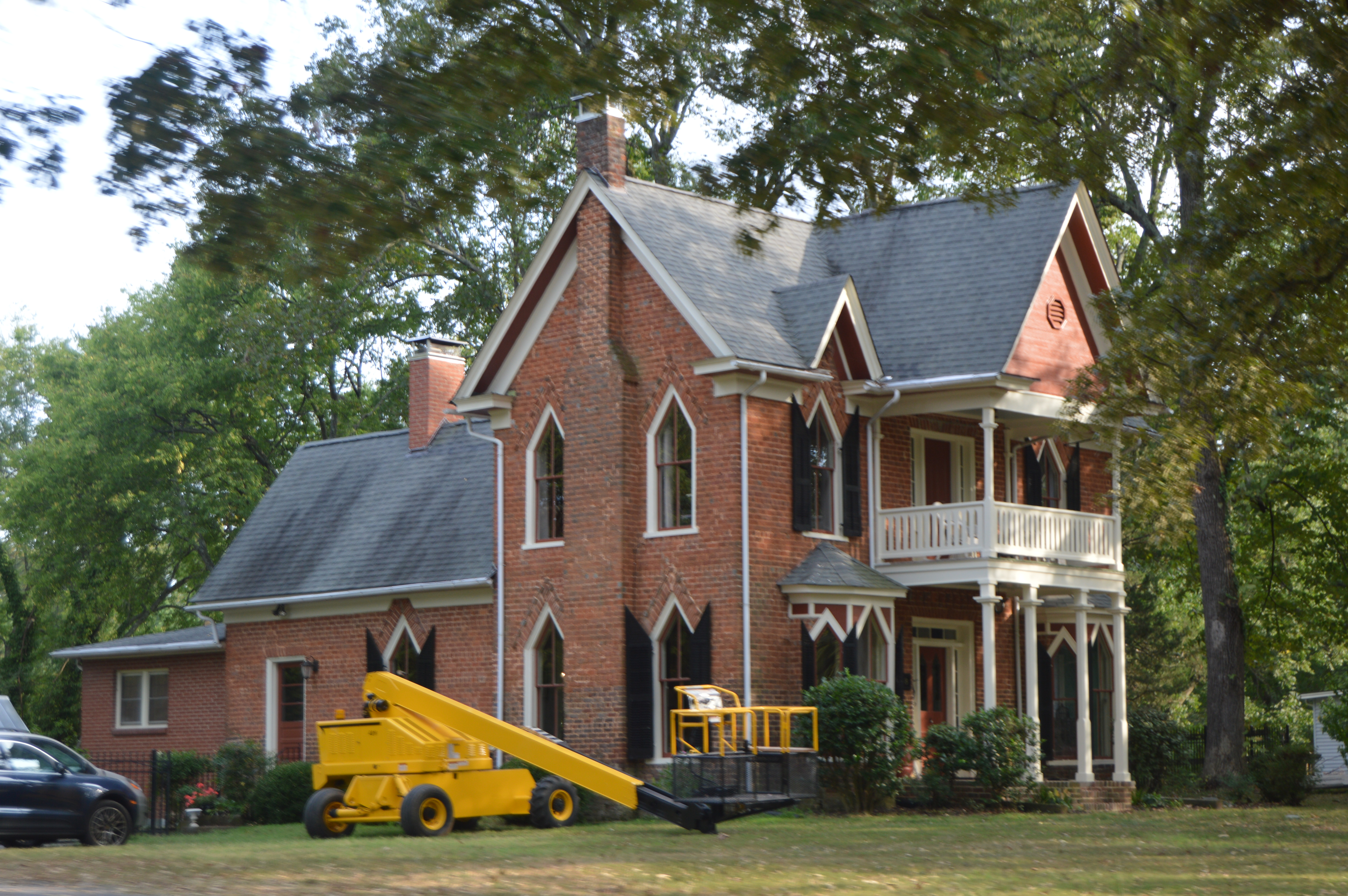
- The Abraham Nail House, 768 N. Main

- Location within North Carolina Location within the United States
- Location: Roughly Main St. from Church St. to Mocksville city limits, Mocksville, North Carolina
- Coordinates: 35°54′04″N 80°33′17″W
- Area: 73 acres (30 ha)
- Built: c. 1890
- Architect: Barber & Klutz, James Call
- Architectural style: Late 19th And Early 20th Century American Movements, Late 19th And 20th Century Revivals, Late Victorian
- NRHP reference No.: 90000822
- Added to NRHP: June 1, 1990

North Main Street Historic District is a national historic district located at Mocksville, Davie County, North Carolina. The district encompasses 115 contributing buildings and 2 contributing sites in a linear residential section of Mocksville. It was developed between the 1840s and World War II and includes notable examples of Greek Revival, Italianate, Gothic Revival, Queen Anne, Classical Revival, Shingle Style, American Craftsman, Tudor Revival, and Colonial Revival style residential architecture. Also in the district are the First Methodist Church (1896), the Mocksville Graded School (1911), and the Masonic Picnic Grounds, established in 1883.

Few of its buildings were designed by architects, but the Dr. R.P. Anderson House (1903), at 665 N. Main St., was built from mail order plans of architects Barber & Klutz of Nashville, Tennessee.

It was added to the National Register of Historic Places in 1990.
