= John Edward Belle Shutt House and Outbuildings =

Historic house in North Carolina, United States

- U.S. National Register of Historic Places
- Location within North Carolina Location within the United States
- Location: 2177 NC 801, S, Advance, North Carolina
- Coordinates: 35°56′9″N 80°24′33″W
- Area: 2 acres (0.81 ha)
- Built: 1885, c. 1905
- Built by: Shutt, John Edward Belle (J.E.B.)
- NRHP reference No.: 96000567
- Added to NRHP: May 16, 1996

John Edward Belle Shutt House and Outbuildings is a historic home and outbuilding complex located near Advance, Davie County, North Carolina. The house was built in 1885 and is a 1 1/2-story frame farmhouse with a hall and parlor plan. It was expanded in 1905. Also on the property are the contributing log woodshed (c. 1890), granary (c. 1900), wellhouse / smokehouse (c. 1885), garage (c. 1922), and privy (c. 1885).

It was added to the National Register of Historic Places in 1996.

== Buildings ==
The property contains a main house and five outbuildings.

Farmhouse

A 1 1/2-story frame farmhouse with a hall and parlor plan, built in 1885 and later expanded in 1905.

Woodshed

Small frame rectangular shed northeast of the farmhouse.

Granary

Granary located on the southeast side of the house.

Wellhouse / smokehouse

Wellhouse with two wells at the southeast corner of the house. The wells were capped off in 1974.

Garage

Timber-frame single-car garage on the southeast side of the house.

Privy

Outhouse located southwest of the garage.
