= Davie County Courthouse =

Historic courthouse in North Carolina, US

- U.S. National Register of Historic Places
- U.S. Historic district – Contributing property
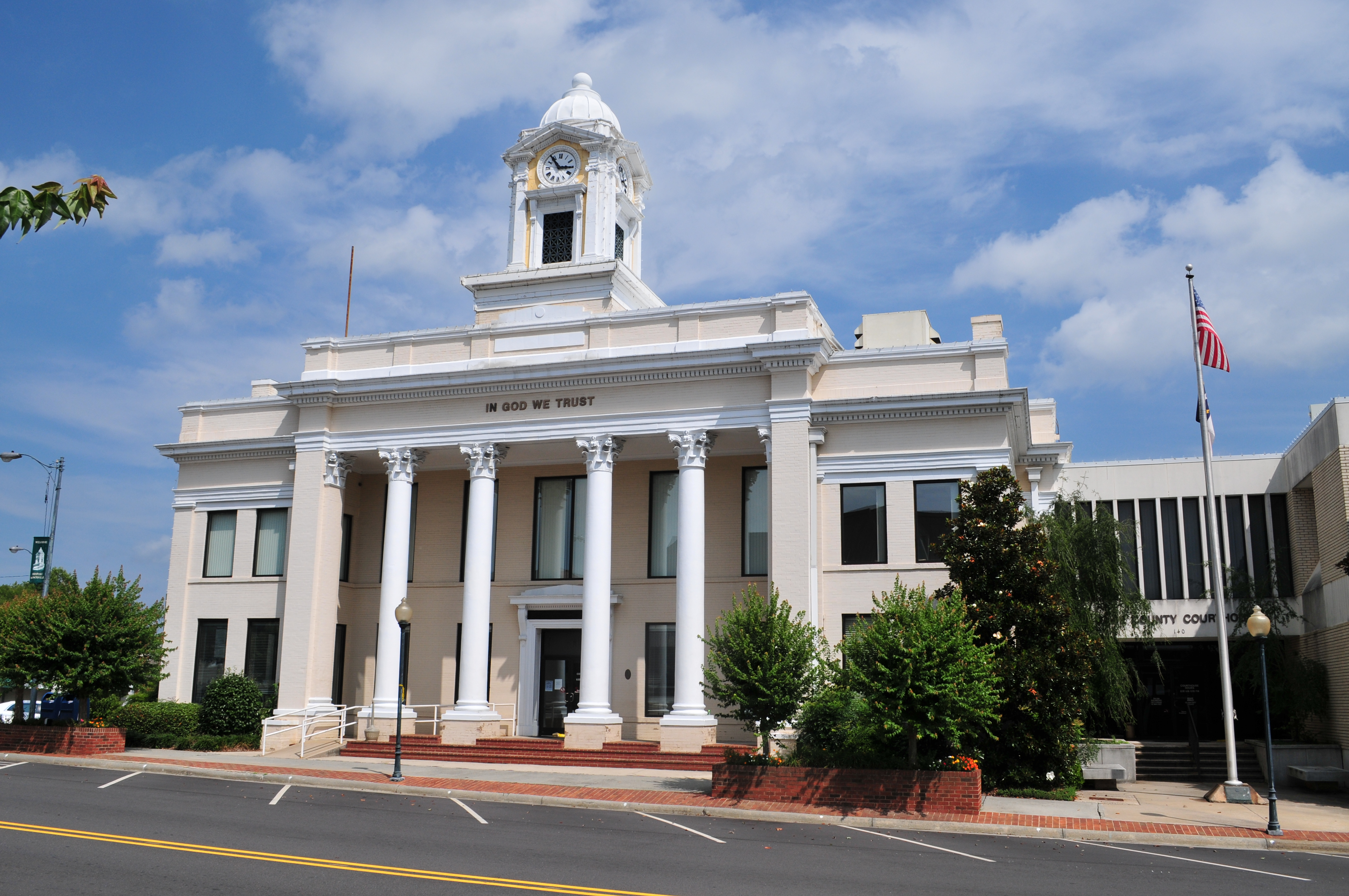
- Davie County Courthouse, September 2013

- Location within North Carolina Location within the United States
- Location: Courthouse Sq., Mocksville, North Carolina
- Coordinates: 35°53′37″N 80°33′41″W
- Area: less than one acre
- Built: 1909
- Built by: Fall City Construction Co.
- Architectural style: Classical Revival
- MPS: North Carolina County Courthouses TR
- NRHP reference No.: 79001702
- Added to NRHP: May 10, 1979

Davie County Courthouse is a historic courthouse located at Mocksville, Davie County, North Carolina. It was built in 1909, and is a two-story reinforced concrete and tan brick structure in the Classical Revival style. It features a tetrastyle Corinthian order in antis portico which shelters the center front entrance, with an ornate square clock cupola. The building was restored and renovated following a fire in 1916. The interior was renovated in 1971.

It was added to the National Register of Historic Places in 1979. It is located in the Downtown Mocksville Historic District.
