= Jesse Clement House =

Historic house in North Carolina, United States

- U.S. National Register of Historic Places
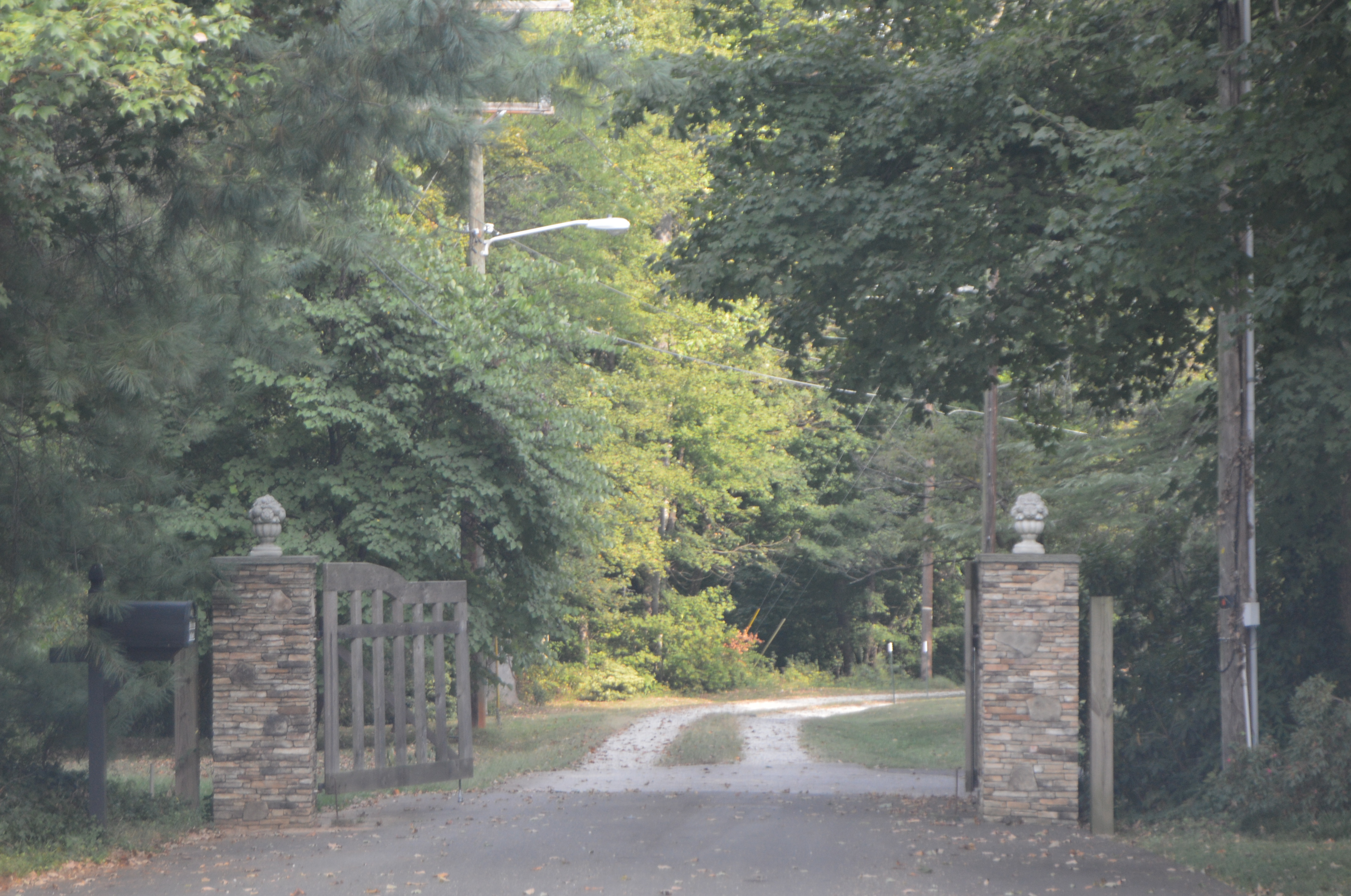
- Property entrance

- Location within North Carolina Location within the United States
- Location: Maple Ave., Mocksville, North Carolina
- Coordinates: 35°53′17″N 80°33′33″W
- Area: 13.7 acres (5.5 ha)
- Built: c. 1828
- Architectural style: Federal
- NRHP reference No.: 80002823
- Added to NRHP: April 17, 1980

Jesse Clement House is a historic home located at Mocksville, Davie County, North Carolina. It was built about 1828, and is a two-story, three-bay, vernacular Federal-style brick dwelling. It has a center hall plan.

It was added to the National Register of Historic Places in 1980.
