= Bermuda Run, North Carolina =

- Town
- Location within the state of North Carolina Bermuda Run (the United States)
- Coordinates: 36°00′15″N 80°25′50″W
- Country: United States
- State: North Carolina
- County: Davie

Area
  - Total: 2.56 sq mi (6.64 km^{2})
  - Land: 2.49 sq mi (6.46 km^{2})
  - Water: 0.069 sq mi (0.18 km^{2})
- Elevation: 748 ft (228 m)

Population (2020)
  - Total: 3,120
  - Density: 1,250.4/sq mi (482.77/km^{2})
- Time zone: UTC-5 (Eastern (EST))
  - Summer (DST): UTC-4 (EDT)
- ZIP code: 27006
- Area code: 336
- FIPS code: 37-05135
- GNIS feature ID: 2405248
- Website: www.bermudarun.gov

Bermuda Run is a town in Davie County, North Carolina, located adjacent to southwestern Forsyth County, North Carolina. As of the 2020 census, the population of the town was 3,120. The town is located on parts of the western bank of the Yadkin River, linking Davie and Forsyth Counties. It was incorporated in 1999 as a gated residential community near country clubs and golf courses, including the Bermuda Run Country Club, Oak Valley Golf Club, and Tanglewood Park. In 2000, the town annexed into neighboring Hillsdale, which coincided with a "developed" commercial district. In 2012, Kinderton Village was voluntarily annexed by the town of Bermuda Run. Bermuda Run is considered by the locals to be a mid-high class community and the second-most influential, behind nearby Oak Valley.

== History ==
Win-Mock Farm Dairy was listed on the National Register of Historic Places in 2010.

== Geography ==
Bermuda Run is located in northeastern Davie County. It is bordered to the northeast, across the Yadkin River, by the village of Clemmons in Forsyth County. Interstate 40 accesses the town from Exit 180 and leads northeast 13 miles (21 km) to Winston-Salem and southwest 31 miles (50 km) to Statesville. Mocksville, the Davie County seat, is 11 miles (18 km) to the southwest via US 158. The northern area of the town is included in the Urban Hanes Mall district.

According to the United States Census Bureau, the town of Bermuda Run has a total area of 1.7 square miles (4.4 km^{2}), of which 1.7 square miles (4.3 km^{2}) is land and 0.04 square miles (0.1 km^{2}), or 3.05%, is water.

== Demographics ==
Historical population
Census	Pop.	Note	%±
2000	1,431		—
2010	1,725		20.5%
2020	3,120		80.9%
U.S. Decennial Census

=== 2020 census ===
As of the 2020 census, Bermuda Run had a population of 3,120. The median age was 59.9 years. 15.2% of residents were under the age of 18 and 43.2% of residents were 65 years of age or older. For every 100 females there were 77.9 males, and for every 100 females age 18 and over there were 75.6 males age 18 and over.

100.0% of residents lived in urban areas, while 0.0% lived in rural areas.

There were 1,477 households in Bermuda Run, of which 19.7% had children under the age of 18 living in them. Of all households, 54.7% were married-couple households, 9.6% were households with a male householder and no spouse or partner present, and 33.0% were households with a female householder and no spouse or partner present. About 33.3% of all households were made up of individuals and 24.9% had someone living alone who was 65 years of age or older.

There were 1,593 housing units, of which 7.3% were vacant. The homeowner vacancy rate was 3.6% and the rental vacancy rate was 10.5%.

Bermuda Run racial composition
Race	Number	Percentage
White (non-Hispanic)	2,728	87.44%
Black or African American (non-Hispanic)	118	3.78%
Native American	7	0.22%
Asian	69	2.21%
Other/Mixed	90	2.88%
Hispanic or Latino	108	3.46%

=== 2000 census ===
As of the census of 2000, there were 1,431 people, 734 households, and 497 families residing in the town. The population density was 1,087.6 inhabitants per square mile (419.9/km^{2}). There were 828 housing units at an average density of 629.3 per square mile (243.0/km^{2}). The racial makeup of the town was 98.95% White, 0.49% African American, 0.07% Native American, 0.07% Pacific Islander, and 0.42% from two or more races. Hispanic or Latino of any race were 1.82% of the population.

There were 734 households, out of which 10.5% had children under the age of 18 living with them, 64.4% were married couples living together, 2.7% had a female householder with no husband present, and 32.2% were non-families. 30.1% of all households were made up of individuals, and 20.0% had someone living alone who was 65 years of age or older. The average household size was 1.93 and the average family size was 2.32.

In the town, the population was spread out, with 9.6% under the age of 18, 1.9% from 18 to 24, 11.9% from 25 to 44, 35.5% from 45 to 64, and 41.0% who were 65 years of age or older. The median age was 60 years. For every 100 females, there were 86.3 males. For every 100 females age 18 and over, there were 84.5 males.

The median income for a household in the town was $84,187, and the median income for a family was $100,727. Males had a median income of $100,000 versus $27,350 for females. The per capita income for the town was $47,765. None of the families and 1.4% of the population were living below the poverty line, including no under eighteens and 1.2% of those over 64.

== Notable person ==
Addison McDowell, U.S. representative
