= Mocksville, North Carolina =

- Town
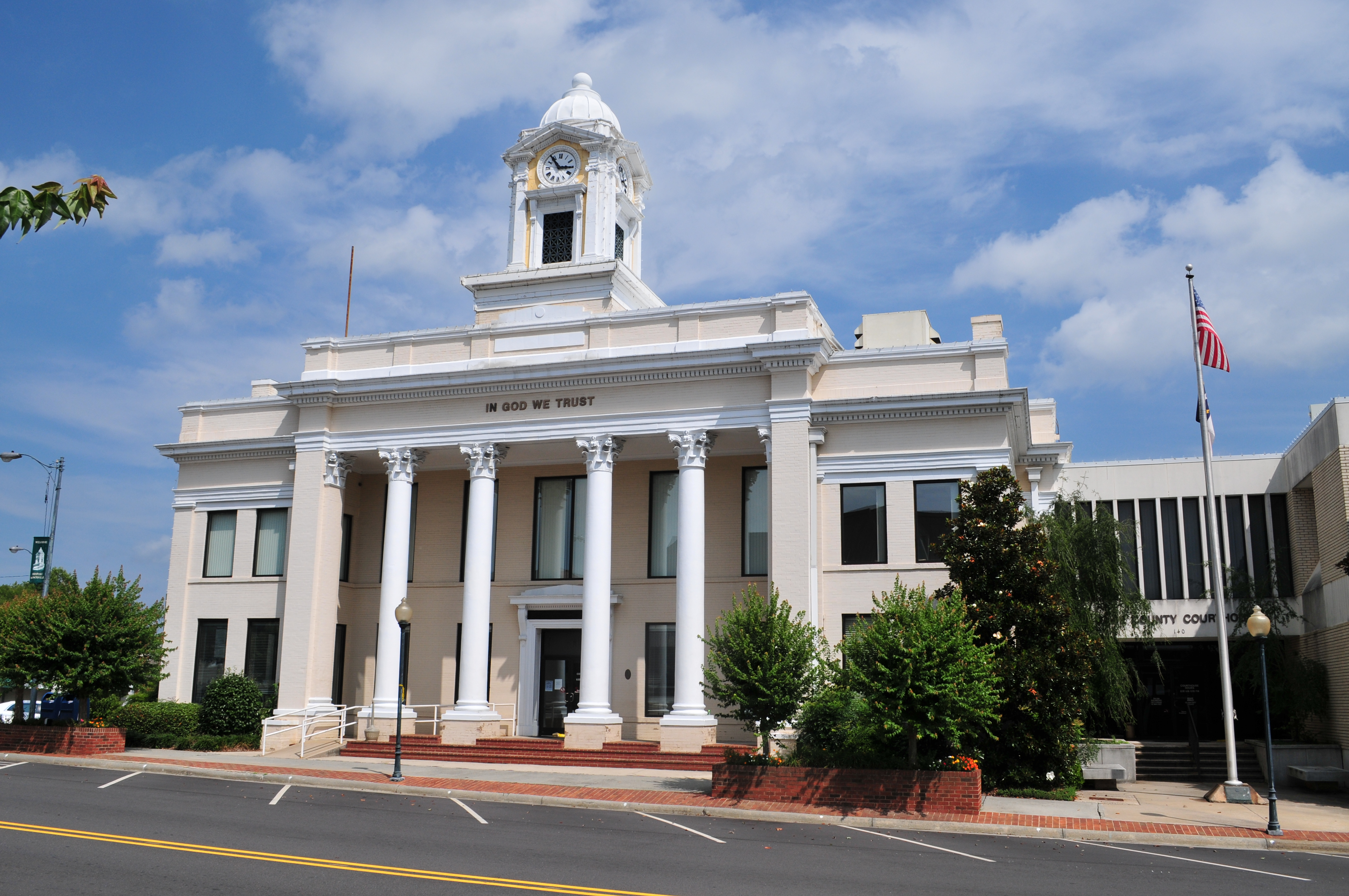
- Davie County Courthouse, Courthouse Square, September 2013

- Seal
- Motto: "Time Well Spent"
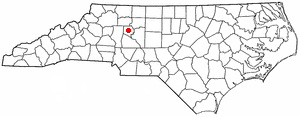
- Location of Mocksville, North Carolina
- Coordinates: 35°54′02″N 80°33′48″W
- Country: United States
- State: North Carolina
- County: Davie

Government
  - Mayor: William J. Marklin III

Area
  - Total: 7.79 sq mi (20.17 km^{2})
  - Land: 7.77 sq mi (20.12 km^{2})
  - Water: 0.019 sq mi (0.05 km^{2})
- Elevation: 810 ft (250 m)

Population (2020)
  - Total: 5,900
  - Estimate (2025): 6,147
  - Density: 759.5/sq mi (293.25/km^{2})
- Time zone: UTC-5 (Eastern (EST))
  - Summer (DST): UTC-4 (EDT)
- ZIP code: 27028
- Area code: 336
- FIPS code: 37-43720
- GNIS feature ID: 1021506
- Website: mocksvillenc.org

Mocksville is a town in Davie County, North Carolina, United States. The population was 5,927 at the 2020 census. I-40 leads west to Statesville and Hickory, and east to Winston-Salem and Greensboro. Route 64 heads east to Lexington, and west towards Statesville and Taylorsville. It is the county seat of Davie County.

== History ==
Mocksville was incorporated as a town in 1839. The town was named for the original owner of the town site, previously referred to as "Mocks Old Field".

George E. Barnhardt House, Boxwood Lodge, Cana Store and Post Office, Jesse Clement House, Cooleemee, Davie County Courthouse, Davie County Jail, Downtown Mocksville Historic District, Hinton Rowan Helper House, Hodges Business College, McGuire-Setzer House, North Main Street Historic District, and Salisbury Street Historic District are listed on the National Register of Historic Places.

== Geography and geology ==
Mocksville is located south of the center of Davie County. U.S. Routes 64 and 601 pass through the town, while U.S. Route 158 has its western terminus in the town center. US 64 leads east 19 miles (31 km) to Lexington and west 24 miles (39 km) to Statesville, while US 601 leads north 19 miles (31 km) to Yadkinville and south 17 miles (27 km) to Salisbury. US 158 leads northeast 26 miles (42 km) to Winston-Salem. Interstate 40 passes 3 miles (5 km) northwest of the center of town, with access from Exit 168 (US 64) and Exit 170 (US 601).

According to the United States Census Bureau, the town has a total area of 7.6 square miles (19.6 km^{2}), of which 0.01 square miles (0.03 km^{2}), or 0.17%, is water.

Located in Mocksville is the Mocksville complex that is made up of metamorphosed and unmetamorphosed gabbros including Farmington Gabbro

=== Climate ===
According to the Köppen Climate Classification system, Mocksville has a humid subtropical climate, abbreviated "Cfa" on climate maps. The hottest temperature recorded in Mocksville was 103 °F (39.4 °C) on August 20–21, 1983 and August 10, 2007, while the coldest temperature recorded was −7 °F (−21.7 °C) on February 5, 1996.

Climate data for Mocksville, North Carolina, 1991–2020 normals, extremes 1893–present
Month	Jan	Feb	Mar	Apr	May	Jun	Jul	Aug	Sep	Oct	Nov	Dec	Year
Record high °F (°C)	77 (25)	81 (27)	89 (32)	97 (36)	98 (37)	99 (37)	101 (38)	103 (39)	97 (36)	96 (36)	83 (28)	80 (27)	103 (39)
Mean maximum °F (°C)	69.7 (20.9)	72.8 (22.7)	80.3 (26.8)	85.7 (29.8)	89.6 (32.0)	93.7 (34.3)	95.7 (35.4)	94.9 (34.9)	91.1 (32.8)	85.6 (29.8)	77.8 (25.4)	70.9 (21.6)	96.8 (36.0)
Mean daily maximum °F (°C)	49.3 (9.6)	53.1 (11.7)	61.0 (16.1)	70.5 (21.4)	77.2 (25.1)	84.2 (29.0)	87.7 (30.9)	86.2 (30.1)	80.4 (26.9)	71.2 (21.8)	61.3 (16.3)	52.6 (11.4)	69.6 (20.9)
Daily mean °F (°C)	37.1 (2.8)	40.1 (4.5)	47.1 (8.4)	56.3 (13.5)	64.8 (18.2)	72.8 (22.7)	76.7 (24.8)	75.5 (24.2)	69.1 (20.6)	57.7 (14.3)	47.3 (8.5)	40.4 (4.7)	57.1 (13.9)
Mean daily minimum °F (°C)	24.8 (−4.0)	27.0 (−2.8)	33.2 (0.7)	42.2 (5.7)	52.5 (11.4)	61.3 (16.3)	65.7 (18.7)	64.8 (18.2)	57.8 (14.3)	44.2 (6.8)	33.3 (0.7)	28.1 (−2.2)	44.6 (7.0)
Mean minimum °F (°C)	8.5 (−13.1)	12.5 (−10.8)	17.7 (−7.9)	26.8 (−2.9)	36.8 (2.7)	49.4 (9.7)	56.8 (13.8)	54.9 (12.7)	44.2 (6.8)	28.6 (−1.9)	19.1 (−7.2)	14.9 (−9.5)	6.7 (−14.1)
Record low °F (°C)	−6 (−21)	−7 (−22)	4 (−16)	12 (−11)	29 (−2)	40 (4)	50 (10)	42 (6)	35 (2)	21 (−6)	11 (−12)	1 (−17)	−7 (−22)
Average precipitation inches (mm)	3.75 (95)	3.27 (83)	4.20 (107)	4.11 (104)	3.61 (92)	4.10 (104)	4.27 (108)	4.63 (118)	4.07 (103)	3.31 (84)	3.58 (91)	3.98 (101)	46.88 (1,190)
Average snowfall inches (cm)	1.9 (4.8)	0.5 (1.3)	0.4 (1.0)	0.0 (0.0)	0.0 (0.0)	0.0 (0.0)	0.0 (0.0)	0.0 (0.0)	0.0 (0.0)	0.0 (0.0)	0.1 (0.25)	1.6 (4.1)	4.5 (11.45)
Average precipitation days (≥ 0.01 in)	8.7	8.5	10.1	9.6	10.5	10.6	9.8	10.4	8.6	7.0	7.8	9.1	110.7
Average snowy days (≥ 0.1 in)	0.8	0.6	0.3	0.0	0.0	0.0	0.0	0.0	0.0	0.0	0.0	0.4	2.1
Source 1: NOAA
Source 2: National Weather Service

== Demographics ==
Historical population
Census	Pop.	Note	%±
1860	710		—
1870	300		−57.7%
1880	562		87.3%
1900	745		—
1910	1,063		42.7%
1920	1,146		7.8%
1930	1,503		31.2%
1940	1,607		6.9%
1950	1,909		18.8%
1960	2,379		24.6%
1970	2,529		6.3%
1980	2,637		4.3%
1990	3,399		28.9%
2000	4,178		22.9%
2010	5,051		20.9%
2020	5,900		16.8%
U.S. Decennial Census

=== 2020 census ===
As of the 2020 census, Mocksville had a population of 5,900. The median age was 40.2 years. 24.4% of residents were under the age of 18 and 21.1% of residents were 65 years of age or older. For every 100 females there were 83.8 males, and for every 100 females age 18 and over there were 77.8 males age 18 and over.

95.7% of residents lived in urban areas, while 4.3% lived in rural areas.

There were 2,344 households in Mocksville, of which 33.6% had children under the age of 18 living in them. Of all households, 40.6% were married-couple households, 17.1% were households with a male householder and no spouse or partner present, and 36.0% were households with a female householder and no spouse or partner present. About 32.3% of all households were made up of individuals and 15.8% had someone living alone who was 65 years of age or older.

There were 2,529 housing units, of which 7.3% were vacant. The homeowner vacancy rate was 2.1% and the rental vacancy rate was 6.2%.

Mocksville racial composition
Race	Number	Percentage
White (non-Hispanic)	3,790	64.24%
Black or African American (non-Hispanic)	834	14.14%
Native American	16	0.27%
Asian	58	1.15%
Pacific Islander	1	0.02%
Other/Mixed	305	5.17%
Hispanic or Latino	886	15.02%

=== 2000 census ===
As of the census of 2000, there were 4,178 people, 1,627 households, and 1,067 families residing in the town. The population density was 607.2 inhabitants per square mile (234.4/km^{2}). There were 1,781 housing units at an average density of 258.8 per square mile (99.9/km^{2}). The racial makeup of the town was 76.14% White, 17.76% African American, 0.19% Native American, 0.67% Asian, 0.05% Pacific Islander, 3.83% from other races, and 1.36% from two or more races. Hispanic or Latino of any race were 8.07% of the population.

There were 1,627 households, out of which 30.4% had children under the age of 18 living with them, 46.7% were married couples living together, 14.6% had a female householder with no husband present, and 34.4% were non-families. 30.7% of all households were made up of individuals, and 14.8% had someone living alone who was 65 years of age or older. The average household size was 2.42 and the average family size was 2.97.

In the town, the population was well distributed by age, with 23.5% under the age of 18, 8.9% from 18 to 24, 27.7% from 25 to 44, 21.4% from 45 to 64, and 18.6% who were 65 years of age or older. The median age was 37 years. For every 100 females, there were 90.3 males. For every 100 females age 18 and over, there were 83.3 males.

The median income for a household in the town was $35,407, and the median income for a family was $42,357. Males had a median income of $31,540 versus $23,375 for females. The per capita income for the town was $18,703. About 9.3% of families and 12.6% of the population were below the poverty line, including 12.8% of those under age 18 and 14.3% of those age 65 or over.

== Notable people ==
- Daniel Boone, lived near Mocksville 1750–66. His father, Squire Boone Sr., was the Justice of the Peace for Mocksville. Squire Boone and his wife Sarah are buried in Mocksville's Joppa Cemetery.
- Clint Bowyer, NASCAR Driver, currently residing in Mocksville, originally from Emporia, Kansas
- Andrew Brock, former State Senator
- Thomas Ferebee, bombardier on the Enola Gay during the bombing of Hiroshima
- Joe Gibbs, NFL coach and NASCAR team owner, member of Pro Football Hall of Fame and NASCAR Hall of Fame
- Hinton Rowan Helper, abolitionist and author of The Impending Crisis of the South. His residence in Mocksville, Hinton Rowan Helper House, is now a U.S. Historic Landmark.
- Julia C. Howard, member of the North Carolina General Assembly
- Caleb Martin, NBA player
- Cody Martin, NBA player
- Whit Merrifield, MLB utility player, 3x All-Star selection
