= Turkeyfoot, North Carolina =

Unincorporated community in North Carolina, US

Turkeyfoot is an unincorporated community in North Carolina, United States. It is located on the Davie County and Iredell County line.

== Geography ==
Turkeyfoot is located at 36.001063°N 80.702648°W.

Nearby communities include Sheffield, Harmony, Lone Hickory, Houstonville, and Cana.

One prominent local topographical feature is Bear Creek. It is of such local prominence that after Sandy Springs Road crosses from Iredell County to Davie County, the road name changes to Bear Creek Church Road. While not directly named after the creek, this road is named after a local church so named after the creek. While not a navigable waterway, Daniel Boone often hunted along properties he and his father owned along Bear Creek while he lived in Davie County during the 1750s and 1760s. Bear Creek is a tributary of the Yadkin River.

== Economy ==
Historically Davie County has had less liberal laws with regard to alcohol sales than Iredell County. As these laws change in Davie County, it has adversely affect businesses that have traditionally prospered from alcohol sales across the county lines including those in the Turkeyfoot community.

Other local businesses include automotive repair garages, a farrier, a machine shop, a plant nursery, logging interests, dairy farms, family farms, digital film production services, and accounting services. Local churches include Rock Springs Baptist Church and Sandy Springs Baptist Church.

From the mid-1970, family farming has followed the national trend of decline in Turkeyfoot. Regulations, such as acreage allotment, on tobacco farming has severely impacted acreage cultivated in tobacco once common in the mid-1970s. Starting in the 1980s some larger farms have been sold and subdivided into residential lots.
