= North Carolina's 77th House district =

American legislative district

North Carolina's 77th State House of Representatives district
Representative
Julia Craven Howard; R–Mocksville
- Demographics: 81% White; 4% Black; 10% Hispanic; 4% Multiracial
- Population (2024): 92,443

North Carolina's 77th House district is one of 120 districts in the North Carolina House of Representatives. It has been represented by Republican Julia Craven Howard since 2019.

== Geography ==
Since 2023, the district has included all of Yadkin and Davie counties, as well as part of Rowan County. The district overlaps with the 30th and 33rd, and 36th Senate districts.

== District officeholders ==
Representative	Party	Dates	Notes	Counties
District created January 1, 1993.
Carolyn Russell (Goldsboro)	Republican	January 1, 1993 – January 1, 2003	Redistricted from the 11th district. Redistricted to the 26th district and retired.	1993–2003; Parts of Wayne, Greene, and Lenoir counties.
Lorene Coates (Salisbury)	Democratic	January 1, 2003 – January 1, 2011	Redistricted from the 35th district. Lost re-election.	2003–2019; Part of Rowan County.
Harry Warren (Salisbury)	Republican	January 1, 2011 – January 1, 2019	Redistricted to the 76th district.	2003–2019; Part of Rowan County.
Julia Craven Howard (Mocksville)	Republican	January 1, 2019 – Present	Redistricted from the 79th district.	2019–2023; All of Davie County. Part of Rowan County.
Julia Craven Howard (Mocksville)	Republican	January 1, 2019 – Present	Redistricted from the 79th district.	2023–Present; All of Yadkin and Davie counties. Part of Rowan County.

== Election results ==
=== 2024 ===
North Carolina House of Representatives 77th district general election, 2024
Party	Candidate	Votes	%
Republican	Julia Craven Howard (incumbent)	41,240	79.08%
Democratic	Kashmir Sibby	10,907	20.92%
Total votes		52,147	100%
Republican hold			

=== 2022 ===
North Carolina House of Representatives 77th district general election, 2022
Party	Candidate	Votes	%
Republican	Julia Craven Howard (incumbent)	30,953	100%
Total votes		30,953	100%
Republican hold			

=== 2020 ===
North Carolina House of Representatives 77th district general election, 2020
Party	Candidate	Votes	%
Republican	Juila Craven Howard (incumbent)	35,222	74.65%
Democratic	Keith Townsend	11,963	25.35%
Total votes		47,185	100%
Republican hold			

=== 2018 ===
North Carolina House of Representatives 77th district general election, 2018
Party	Candidate	Votes	%
Republican	Juila Craven Howard (incumbent)	23,654	73.37%
Democratic	Bonnie Dawn Clark	8,584	26.63%
Total votes		32,238	100%
Republican hold			

=== 2016 ===
North Carolina House of Representatives 77th district Republican primary election, 2016
Party	Candidate	Votes	%
Republican	Harry Warren (incumbent)	7,350	71.44%
Republican	Andrew H. Poston	2,939	28.56%
Total votes		10,289	100%

North Carolina House of Representatives 77th district general election, 2016
Party	Candidate	Votes	%
Republican	Harry Warren (incumbent)	27,699	100%
Total votes		27,699	100%
Republican hold			

=== 2014 ===
North Carolina House of Representatives 77th district Republican primary election, 2014
Party	Candidate	Votes	%
Republican	Harry Warren (incumbent)	4,746	63.91%
Republican	Chad Mitchell	2,680	36.09%
Total votes		7,426	100%

North Carolina House of Representatives 77th district general election, 2014
Party	Candidate	Votes	%
Republican	Harry Warren (incumbent)	16,888	100%
Total votes		16,888	100%
Republican hold			

=== 2012 ===
North Carolina House of Representatives 77th district general election, 2012
Party	Candidate	Votes	%
Republican	Harry Warren (incumbent)	21,463	61.87%
Democratic	William H. Battermann	13,226	38.13%
Total votes		34,689	100%
Republican hold			

=== 2010 ===
North Carolina House of Representatives 77th district Republican primary election, 2010
Party	Candidate	Votes	%
Republican	Harry Warren	2,305	65.88%
Republican	Lauren Raper	1,194	34.12%
Total votes		3,499	100%

North Carolina House of Representatives 77th district general election, 2010
Party	Candidate	Votes	%
Republican	Harry Warren	9,117	50.46%
Democratic	Lorene Coates (incumbent)	8,951	49.54%
Total votes		18,068	100%
Republican gain from Democratic			

=== 2008 ===
North Carolina House of Representatives 77th district general election, 2008
Party	Candidate	Votes	%
Democratic	Lorene Coates (incumbent)	20,050	66.85%
Republican	Ada M. Fisher	9,942	33.15%
Total votes		29,992	100%
Democratic hold			

=== 2006 ===
North Carolina House of Representatives 77th district general election, 2006
Party	Candidate	Votes	%
Democratic	Lorene Coates (incumbent)	8,279	61.68%
Republican	Susan Morris	5,144	38.32%
Total votes		13,423	100%
Democratic hold			

=== 2004 ===
North Carolina House of Representatives 77th district general election, 2004
Party	Candidate	Votes	%
Democratic	Lorene Coates (incumbent)	15,026	60.64%
Republican	Mac Butner	9,751	39.36%
Total votes		24,777	100%
Democratic hold			

=== 2002 ===
North Carolina House of Representatives 77th district general election, 2002
Party	Candidate	Votes	%
Republican	Charlotte A. Gardner	2,938	59.59%
Republican	Lynn Dula	1,992	40.41%
Total votes		4,930	100%

North Carolina House of Representatives 77th district general election, 2002
Party	Candidate	Votes	%
Democratic	Lorene Coates (incumbent)	9,886	55.02%
Republican	Charlotte A. Gardner	8,081	44.98%
Total votes		7,967	100%
Democratic hold			

=== 2000 ===
North Carolina House of Representatives 77th district general election, 2000
Party	Candidate	Votes	%
Republican	Carolyn Russell (incumbent)	17,538	100%
Total votes		17,538	100%
Republican hold			
