= Flue-cured tobacco =

Variety of cigarette tobacco

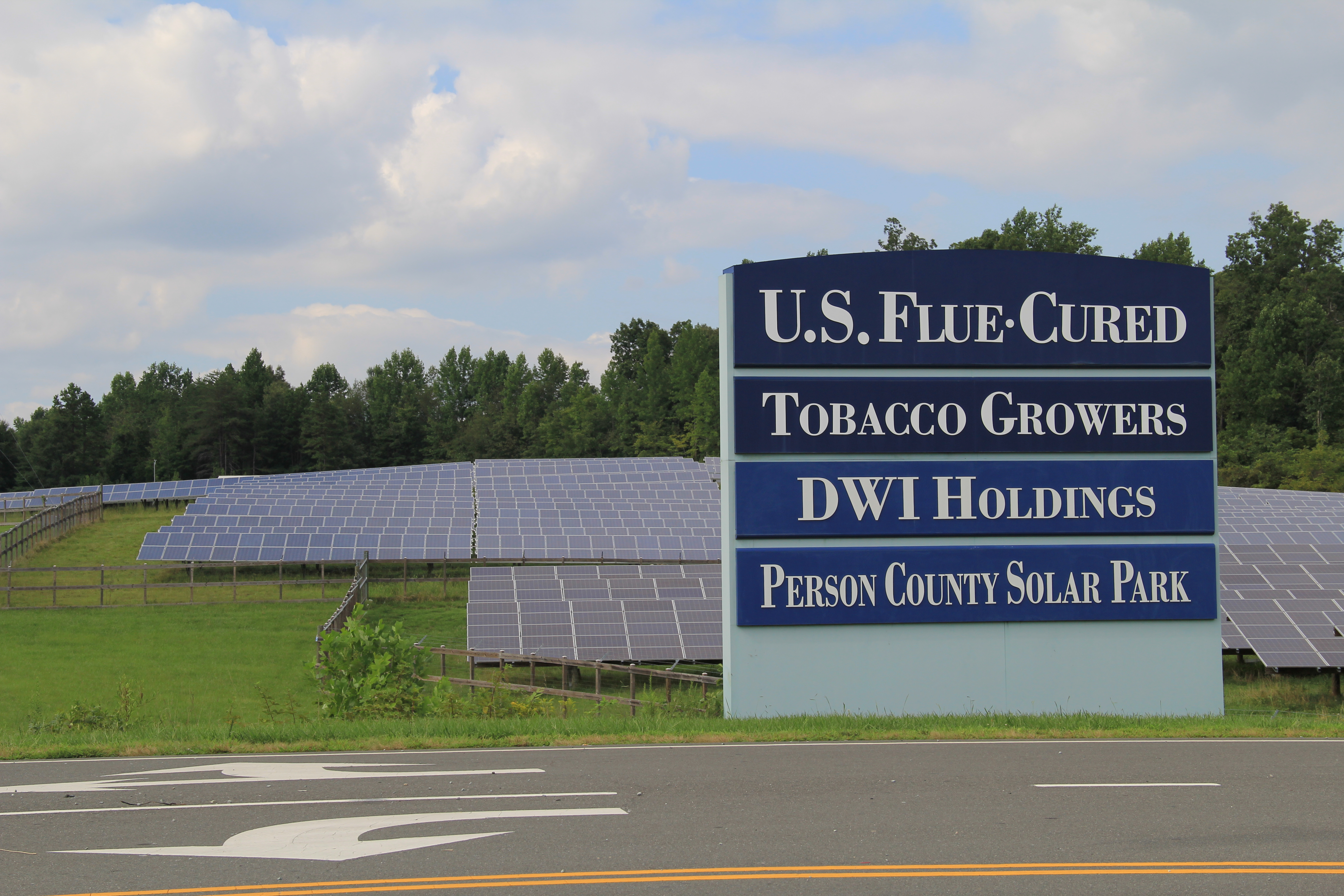
U.S. Flue-Cured Tobacco Growers, Person County, North Carolina

Flue-cured tobacco is a type of cigarette tobacco. Along with burley tobacco, it accounts for more than 90% of US tobacco production. Flue-cured farming is centered in North Carolina. Production was limited by national marketing quotas and acreage allotments. The crop was eligible for non-recourse price support loans until 2005, when the quota buyout program ended these programs (PL 108-357, Title VI).

== See also ==
- Tobacco § Curing
- Types of tobacco
