= Maine, North Carolina =

- Unincorporated community
- Location within the state of North Carolina
- Coordinates: 35°55′52″N 80°32′44″W
- Country: United States
- State: North Carolina
- County: Davie County
- Elevation: 797 ft (243 m)
- Time zone: UTC-5 (Eastern (EST))
  - Summer (DST): UTC-4 (EDT)
- ZIP code: 27028
- Area code: 336
- GNIS feature ID: 989248

Maine is an unincorporated community in Davie County, North Carolina, United States, located at the intersection US 158 and Sain Road (SR 1643), north of Mocksville. The community is sometimes referred to by the variant name "Oak Grove."
