= North Carolina's 76th House district =

American legislative district

North Carolina's 76th State House of Representatives district
Representative
Harry Warren; R–Salisbury
- Demographics: 65% White; 20% Black; 11% Hispanic; 1% Asian; 3% Multiracial
- Population (2024): 93,296

North Carolina's 76th House district is one of 120 districts in the North Carolina House of Representatives. It has been represented by Republican Harry Warren since 2019.

== Geography ==
Since 2019, the district has included part of Rowan County. The district overlaps with the 33rd Senate district.

== District officeholders ==
Representative	Party	Dates	Notes	Counties
District created January 1, 1993.
W. W. Dickson (Gastonia)	Republican	January 1, 1993 – January 1, 1999	Retired.	1993–2003; Parts of Gaston and Mecklenburg counties.
John Bridgeman (Gastonia)	Democratic	January 1, 1999 – January 1, 2001	Lost re-election.	1993–2003; Parts of Gaston and Mecklenburg counties.
Michael Harrington (Gastonia)	Republican	January 1, 2001 – January 1, 2003	Redistricted to the 108th district and retired.	1993–2003; Parts of Gaston and Mecklenburg counties.
Gene McCombs (Faith)	Republican	January 1, 2003 – January 20, 2004	Redistricted from the 83rd district. Died.	2003–2013; Part of Rowan County.
Vacant		January 20, 2004 – February 16, 2004		2003–2013; Part of Rowan County.
Fred Steen II (Landis)	Republican	February 16, 2004 – January 1, 2013	Appointed to finish McComb's term. Retired to run for Congress.	2003–2013; Part of Rowan County.
Carl Ford (China Grove)	Republican	January 1, 2013 – January 1, 2019	Retired to run for State Senate.	2013–2019; Parts of Rowan and Cabarrus counties.
Harry Warren (Salisbury)	Republican	January 1, 2019 – Present	Redistricted from the 77th district. Retiring to run for Rowan County Clerk of Superior Court.	2019–Present; Part of Rowan County.

== Election results ==
=== 2024 ===
North Carolina House of Representatives 76th district general election, 2024
Party	Candidate	Votes	%
Republican	Harry Warren (incumbent)	27,060	62.37%
Democratic	Alisha Byrd-Clark	16,329	37.63%
Total votes		43,389	100%
Republican hold			

=== 2022 ===
North Carolina House of Representatives 76th district general election, 2022
Party	Candidate	Votes	%
Republican	Harry Warren (incumbent)	21,050	100%
Total votes		21,050	100%
Republican hold			

=== 2020 ===
North Carolina House of Representatives 76th district general election, 2020
Party	Candidate	Votes	%
Republican	Harry Warren (incumbent)	25,479	61.06%
Democratic	Al Heggins	16,250	38.94%
Total votes		41,729	100%
Republican hold			

=== 2018 ===
North Carolina House of Representatives 76th district general election, 2018
Party	Candidate	Votes	%
Republican	Harry Warren (incumbent)	16,718	61.25%
Democratic	Joe Fowler	10,578	38.75%
Total votes		27,296	100%
Republican hold			

=== 2016 ===
North Carolina House of Representatives 76th district general election, 2016
Party	Candidate	Votes	%
Republican	Carl Ford (incumbent)	29,590	100%
Total votes		29,590	100%
Republican hold			

=== 2014 ===
North Carolina House of Representatives 76th district general election, 2014
Party	Candidate	Votes	%
Republican	Carl Ford (incumbent)	16,947	100%
Total votes		16,947	100%
Republican hold			

=== 2012 ===
North Carolina House of Representatives 76th district Republican primary election, 2012
Party	Candidate	Votes	%
Republican	Carl Ford	7,482	73.61%
Republican	Eric Troyer	2,683	26.39%
Total votes		10,165	100%

North Carolina House of Representatives 76th district general election, 2012
Party	Candidate	Votes	%
Republican	Carl Ford	25,486	100%
Total votes		25,486	100%
Republican hold			

=== 2010 ===
North Carolina House of Representatives 76th district general election, 2010
Party	Candidate	Votes	%
Republican	Fred Steen II (incumbent)	15,093	100%
Total votes		15,093	100%
Republican hold			

=== 2008 ===
North Carolina House of Representatives 76th district Republican primary election, 2008
Party	Candidate	Votes	%
Republican	Fred Steen II (incumbent)	3,530	70.49%
Republican	Robert W. Campbell	1,478	29.51%
Total votes		5,008	100%

North Carolina House of Representatives 76th district general election, 2008
Party	Candidate	Votes	%
Republican	Fred Steen II (incumbent)	24,059	100%
Total votes		24,059	100%
Republican hold			

=== 2006 ===
North Carolina House of Representatives 76th district general election, 2006
Party	Candidate	Votes	%
Republican	Fred Steen II (incumbent)	9,457	100%
Total votes		9,457	100%
Republican hold			

=== 2004 ===
North Carolina House of Representatives 76th district Republican primary election, 2004
Party	Candidate	Votes	%
Republican	Fred Steen II (incumbent)	1,809	53.27%
Republican	Chad Mitchell	927	27.30%
Republican	Thomas L. "Tom" Smith	660	19.43%
Total votes		3,396	100%

North Carolina House of Representatives 76th district general election, 2004
Party	Candidate	Votes	%
Republican	Fred Steen II (incumbent)	21,610	100%
Total votes		21,610	100%
Republican hold			

=== 2002 ===
North Carolina House of Representatives 76th district general election, 2002
Party	Candidate	Votes	%
Republican	Gene McCombs (incumbent)	14,703	100%
Total votes		14,703	100%
Republican hold			

=== 2000 ===
North Carolina House of Representatives 76th district Republican primary election, 2000
Party	Candidate	Votes	%
Republican	Michael Harrington	1,532	57.46%
Republican	C. David Ward Jr.	1,134	42.54%
Total votes		2,666	100%

North Carolina House of Representatives 76th district general election, 2000
Party	Candidate	Votes	%
Republican	Michael Harrington	15,430	55.79%
Democratic	John Bridgeman (incumbent)	12,230	44.22%
Total votes		27,660	100%
Republican gain from Democratic			

=== 1998 ===
North Carolina House of Representatives 76th district general election, 1998
Party	Candidate	Votes	%
Democratic	John Bridgeman	9,117	52.67%
Republican	Patrick McHenry	8,192	47.33%
Total votes		17,309	100%
Democratic gain from Republican			

=== 1996 ===
North Carolina House of Representatives 76th district general election, 1996
Party	Candidate	Votes	%
Republican	W. W. Dickson (incumbent)	17,705	100%
Total votes		17,705	100%
Republican hold			
