= Carl Ford (politician) =

American politician from North Carolina

Senator Carl Ford
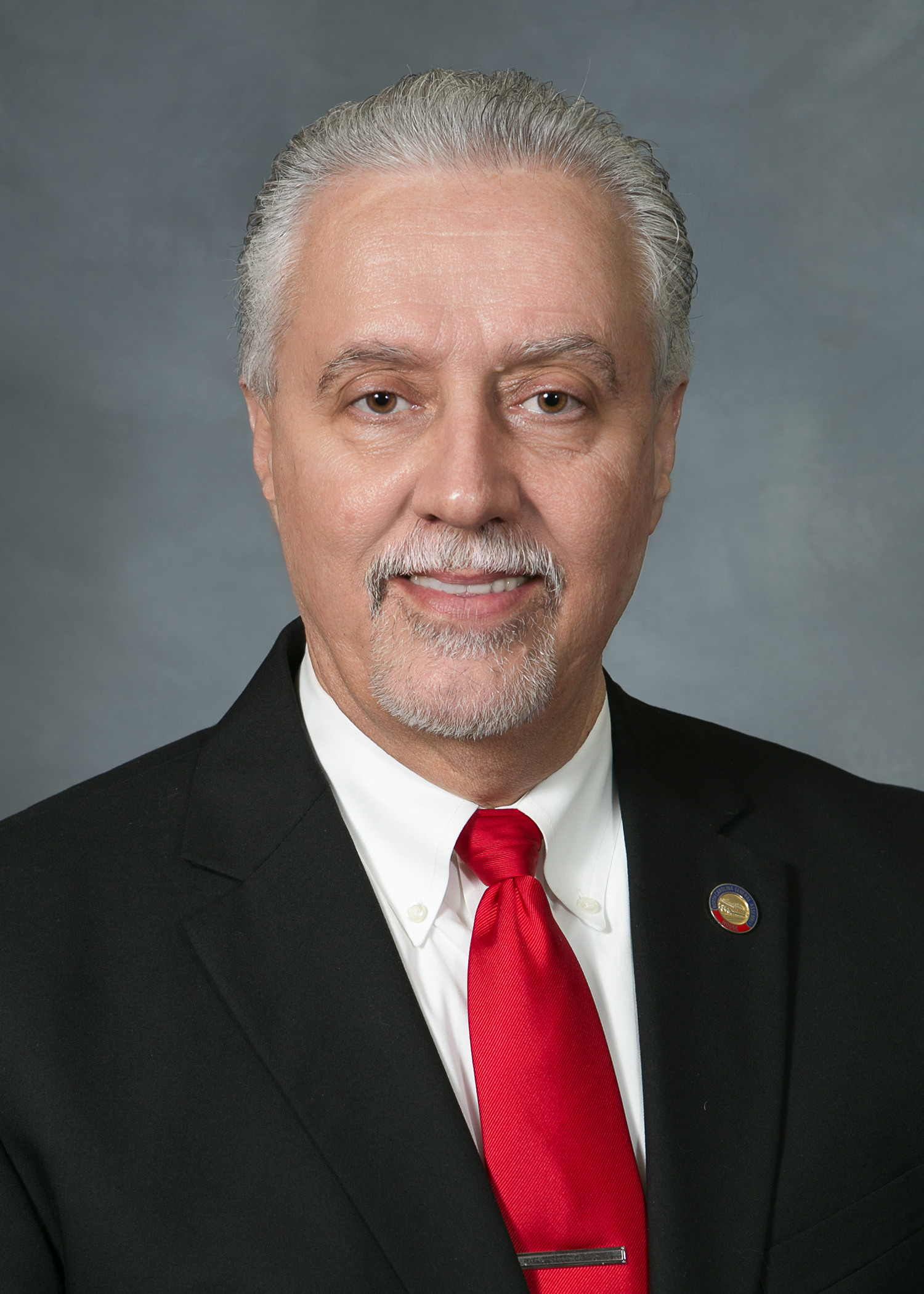

Member of the North Carolina Senate from the 33rd district
- Incumbent
- Assumed office January 1, 2019
- Preceded by: Constituency established

Member of the North Carolina House of Representatives from the 76th district
- In office January 1, 2013 – January 1, 2019
- Preceded by: Fred Steen II
- Succeeded by: Harry Warren

Personal details
- Born: July 11, 1957 (age 69) Kannapolis, North Carolina, U.S.
- Party: Republican
- Occupation: businessman

Carl L. Ford (born July 11, 1957) is a Republican member of the North Carolina Senate representing the 33rd district. He previously represented the 76th district in the North Carolina House of Representatives.

In 2013, Ford proposed a bill that would have seen North Carolina establish an official state religion.

== Electoral history ==
=== 2020 ===
North Carolina Senate 33rd district general election, 2020
Party	Candidate	Votes	%
Republican	Carl Ford incumbent)	73,453	70.54%
Democratic	Tarsha Ellis	30,679	29.46%
Total votes		104,132	100%
Republican hold			

=== 2018 ===
North Carolina Senate 33rd district Republican primary election, 2018
Party	Candidate	Votes	%
Republican	Carl Ford	8,418	60.04%
Republican	Bill Sorenson	5,602	39.96%
Total votes		14,020	100%

North Carolina Senate 33rd district general election, 2018
Party	Candidate	Votes	%
Republican	Carl Ford	47,473	68.18%
Democratic	Arin Wilhelm	22,154	31.82%
Total votes		69,627	100%
Republican win (new seat)			

=== 2016 ===
North Carolina House of Representatives 76th district general election, 2016
Party	Candidate	Votes	%
Republican	Carl Ford (incumbent)	29,590	100%
Total votes		29,590	100%
Republican hold			

=== 2014 ===
North Carolina House of Representatives 76th district general election, 2014
Party	Candidate	Votes	%
Republican	Carl Ford (incumbent)	16,947	100%
Total votes		16,947	100%
Republican hold			

=== 2012 ===
North Carolina House of Representatives 76th district Republican primary election, 2012
Party	Candidate	Votes	%
Republican	Carl Ford	7,482	73.61%
Republican	Eric Troyer	2,683	26.39%
Total votes		10,165	100%

North Carolina House of Representatives 76th district general election, 2012
Party	Candidate	Votes	%
Republican	Carl Ford	25,486	100%
Total votes		25,486	100%
Republican hold			

North Carolina House of Representatives
Preceded by Fred Steen II	Member of the North Carolina House of Representatives from the 76th district 2013-2019	Succeeded by Harry Warren
North Carolina Senate
Preceded by Cathy Dunn	Member of the North Carolina Senate from the 33rd district 2019-Present	Incumbent
