= Fred F. Steen II =

American politician from North Carolina

Representative Fred F. Steen II
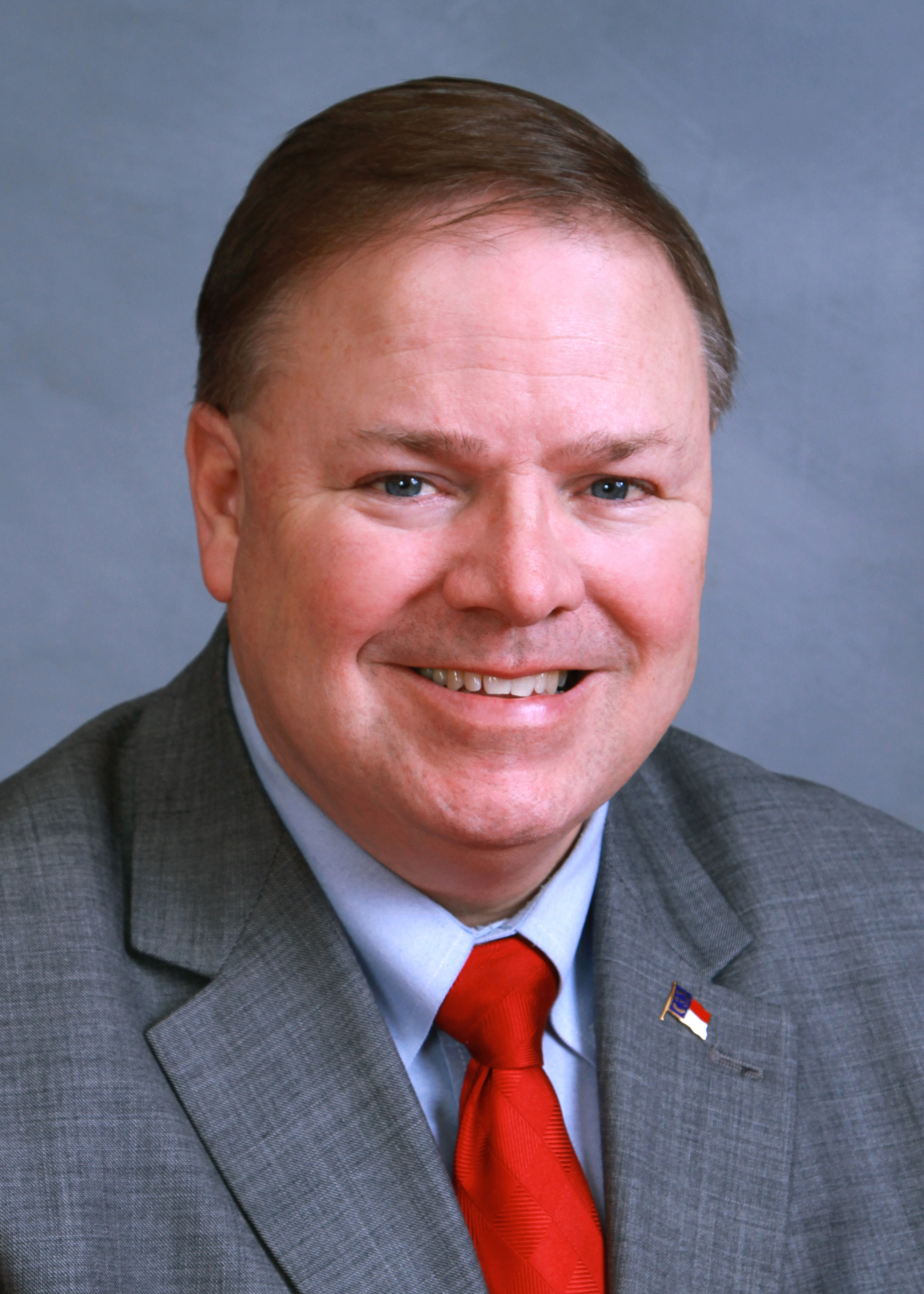

Member of the North Carolina House of Representatives from the 76th district
- In office February 16, 2004 – January 1, 2013
- Preceded by: Gene McCombs
- Succeeded by: Carl Ford

Personal details
- Born: June 16, 1960 (age 66) Landis, North Carolina
- Party: Republican
- Spouse: Tena
- Occupation: Cost Analyst, Engineer

Fred F. Steen II served as the chief lobbyist/legislative liaison for North Carolina Governor Pat McCrory until 2016 when McCrory appointed him to the Board of Review. From 2004 through 2012, Steen served as a Republican member of the North Carolina General Assembly representing the state's 76th House District, including constituents in Rowan County. A cost analyst from Landis, North Carolina, he served as the town's mayor for eight years until he was appointed on 16 February 2004 to fill the seat of W. Eugene McCombs, who died in office.

In 2011, Steen was ranked 4th in the North Carolina House for pro-business legislation by the North Carolina Free Enterprise Foundation.

On December 8, 2011, Steen announced he would not run for re-election to the NC House, but would instead run for the Republican nomination for North Carolina's 8th congressional district, then represented by Democrat Larry Kissell. He lost in the Republican primary.

While a legislator, he served on the board of directors of the American Legislative Exchange Council (ALEC), a national association of legislators.

== Electoral history ==
=== Mayoral ===
Mayor of Landis Municipal Election 1999
| Candidate | Votes | % |
|---|---|---|
| Fred F. Steen II (unopposed) | 100 | 100.00 |
| Majority | 100 | 100.00 |
| Total votes | 100 | 100.00 |

Mayor of Landis Municipal Election 2001
| Candidate | Votes | % |
|---|---|---|
| Fred F. Steen II | 544 | 71.67 |
| C. J. Nickelson Jr. | 211 | 27.80 |
| Write-in votes | 4 | 0.53 |
| Majority | 333 | 43.87 |
| Total votes | 759 | 100.00 |

Mayor of Landis Municipal Election 2003
| Candidate | Votes | % |
|---|---|---|
| Fred F. Steen II | 421 | 53.36 |
| C. J. Nickelson Jr. (write-in) | 368 | 46.64 |
| Majority | 53 | 6.71 |
| Total votes | 789 | 100.00 |

=== State representative ===
North Carolina House District 76 Primary Election 2004
| Party | Candidate | Votes | % |
|---|---|---|---|
| Republican | Fred F. Steen II | 1,809 | 53.27 |
| Republican | Chad Mitchell | 927 | 27.30 |
| Republican | Thomas L. (Tom) Smith | 660 | 19.43 |
| Majority | | 882 | 25.97 |
| Total votes | | 3,396 | 100.00 |

North Carolina House District 76 General Election 2004
| Party | Candidate | Votes | % |
|---|---|---|---|
| Republican | Fred F. Steen II (unopposed) | 21,610 | 100.00 |
| Majority | | 21610 | 100.00 |
| Total votes | | 21,610 | 100.00 |

North Carolina House District 76 General Election 2006
| Party | Candidate | Votes | % |
|---|---|---|---|
| Republican | Fred F. Steen II (unopposed) | 9,457 | 100.00 |
| Majority | | 9457 | 100.00 |
| Total votes | | 9,457 | 100.00 |

North Carolina House District 76 Primary Election 2008
| Party | Candidate | Votes | % |
|---|---|---|---|
| Republican | Fred F. Steen II | 3,530 | 70.49 |
| Republican | Robert W. Campbell | 1,478 | 29.51 |
| Majority | | 2052 | 40.97 |
| Total votes | | 5,008 | 100.00 |

North Carolina House District 76 General Election 2008
| Party | Candidate | Votes | % |
|---|---|---|---|
| Republican | Fred F. Steen II (unopposed) | 24,059 | 100.00 |
| Majority | | 24059 | 100.00 |
| Total votes | | 24,059 | 100.00 |

North Carolina House District 76 General Election 2010
| Party | Candidate | Votes | % |
|---|---|---|---|
| Republican | Fred F. Steen II (unopposed) | 15,093 | 100.00 |
| Majority | | 15093 | 100.00 |
| Total votes | | 15,093 | 100.00 |

=== Congressional ===
US House of Representatives 8th District Republican primary election 2012
| Party | Candidate | Votes | % |
|---|---|---|---|
| Republican | Richard Hudson | 21,451 | 32.07 |
| Republican | Scott Keadle | 14,687 | 21.96 |
| Republican | Vernon Robinson | 12,181 | 18.21 |
| Republican | Fred F. Steen II | 9,670 | 14.46 |
| Republican | John M. Whitley | 8,894 | 13.30 |
| Total votes | | 66,883 | 100.00 |

North Carolina House of Representatives
| Preceded by Gene McCombs | Member of the North Carolina House of Representatives from the 76th district 2004-2013 | Succeeded by Carl Ford |
