= Harry J. Warren =

American politician

Harry Warren
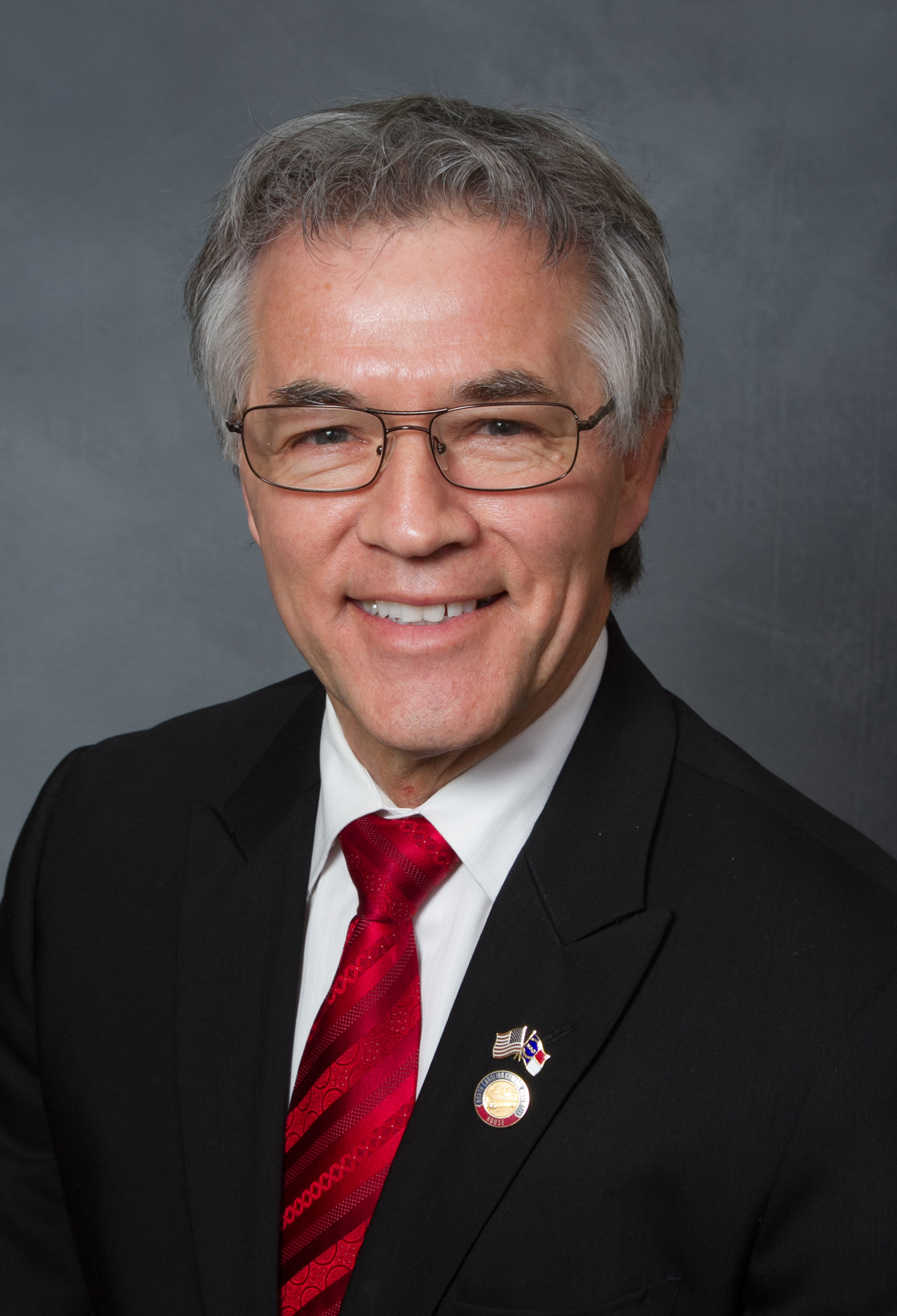

Member of the North Carolina House of Representatives
- Incumbent
- Assumed office January 1, 2011
- Preceded by: Lorene Coates (77th); Carl Ford (76th)
- Constituency: 77th District (2011-2019); 76th District (2019-Present)

Personal details
- Born: Harry Joseph Warren; May 31, 1950 (age 76) East Liverpool, Ohio, U.S.
- Party: Republican
- Spouse(s): Beverly Rizer; Catherine Warren
- Children: 6
- Education: Kent State University (BA)
- Occupation: Human resource specialist
- Website: www.harrywarrennc77.com

Harry Joseph Warren (born May 31, 1950, in East Liverpool, Ohio) is a Human Resource Specialist and Republican member of the North Carolina House of Representatives. He has represented the 76th district (and the preceding 77th district) (including constituents in Rowan County) since 2011.

== Biography ==
Warren graduated from Kent State University in 1972 with a bachelor's degree in Political Science. In 1969, he married the former Beverly Rizer. They were married for 20 years and had 4 children together. He is currently married to Catherine Warren. He has six children total.

Before election to the NC House of Representatives, Warren worked as a Human Resources Specialist for Tar Heel Capital Corp., one of the largest Wendy's restaurant franchises. He is a member of First United Methodist Church in Salisbury, North Carolina.

== North Carolina House of Representatives ==
Warren was Chairman of the House Select Committee on the State's Role in Immigration Policy and Vice-Chairman of the Government committee.

In 2013 Warren and Carl Ford proposed a bill that could have seen North Carolina Establish an Official Religion for the State.

== Committee assignments ==
=== 2021-2022 session ===
- State Personnel (Chair)
- Election Law and Campaign Finance Reform (Vice Chair)
- Finance (Vice Chair)
- Local Government - Land Use, Planning and Development (Vice Chair)
- Families, Children, and Aging Policy
- Insurance
- Redistricting
- State Government
- Transportation

=== 2019-2020 session ===
- Finance (Chair)
- State and Local Government Committee (Chair)
- Election Law and Campaign Finance Reform (Vice Chair)
- Commerce and Job Development
- Insurance
- Transportation

=== 2017-2018 session ===
- State Personnel (Chair)
- Elections and Ethics Law (Vice Chair)
- Finance (Vice Chair)
- State and Local Government I
- Judiciary IV

=== 2015-2016 session ===
- Public Utilities (Chair)
- Elections (Vice Chair)
- Finance (Vice Chair)
- Insurance
- Local Government
- Judiciary IV
- Aging

=== 2013-2014 session ===
- State and Local Government (Chair)
- Public Utilities (Vice Chair)
- Finance
- Insurance
- Commerce and Job Development
- Education

=== 2011-2012 session ===
- Government (Vice Chair)
- Public Utilities
- Finance
- Insurance
- Commerce and Job Development
- Education

== Electoral history ==
=== 2020 ===
North Carolina House of Representatives 76th district general election, 2020
Party	Candidate	Votes	%
Republican	Harry Warren (incumbent)	25,479	61.06%
Democratic	Al Heggins	16,250	38.94%
Total votes		41,729	100%
Republican hold			

=== 2018 ===
North Carolina House of Representatives 76th district general election, 2018
Party	Candidate	Votes	%
Republican	Harry Warren (incumbent)	16,718	61.25%
Democratic	Joe Fowler	10,578	38.75%
Total votes		27,296	100%
Republican hold			

=== 2016 ===
United States House of Representatives North Carolina's 13th congressional district Republican primary election, 2016
Party	Candidate	Votes	%
Republican	Ted Budd	6,340	20.00%
Republican	John Blust	3,308	10.43%
Republican	Hank Henning	3,289	10.37%
Republican	Julia Craven Howard	3,254	10.26%
Republican	Matthew J. McCall	2,872	9.06%
Republican	Andrew Brock	2,803	8.84%
Republican	Jason A. Walser	2,319	7.31%
Republican	Dan Barrett	2,296	7.24%
Republican	Harry Warren	1,266	3.99%
Republican	Vernon Robinson	970	3.06%
Republican	Kay Daly	889	2.80%
Republican	George Rouco	773	2.44%
Republican	Jim Snyder	436	1.38%
Republican	Farren K. Shoaf	404	1.27%
Republican	Chad A. Gant	198	0.62%
Republican	David W. Thompson	147	0.46%
Republican	Kathy Feather	142	0.45%
Total votes		31,706	100%

North Carolina House of Representatives 77th district Republican primary election, 2016
Party	Candidate	Votes	%
Republican	Harry Warren (incumbent)	7,350	71.44%
Republican	Andrew H. Poston	2,939	28.56%
Total votes		10,289	100%

North Carolina House of Representatives 77th district general election, 2016
Party	Candidate	Votes	%
Republican	Harry Warren (incumbent)	27,699	100%
Total votes		27,699	100%
Republican hold			

=== 2014 ===
North Carolina House of Representatives 77th district Republican primary election, 2014
Party	Candidate	Votes	%
Republican	Harry Warren (incumbent)	4,746	63.91%
Republican	Chad Mitchell	2,680	36.09%
Total votes		7,426	100%

North Carolina House of Representatives 77th district general election, 2014
Party	Candidate	Votes	%
Republican	Harry Warren (incumbent)	16,888	100%
Total votes		16,888	100%
Republican hold			

=== 2012 ===
Warren faced no primary challenge. He went on to meet retired minister Bill Battermann (who also was unopposed in Democratic primary) in the general election. Warren defeated Battermann 61% to 38%.

North Carolina House of Representatives 77th district general election, 2012
Party	Candidate	Votes	%
Republican	Harry Warren	21,463	61.87%
Democratic	William H. Battermann	13,226	38.13%
Total votes		34,689	100%
Republican hold			

=== 2010 ===
In 2010, Harry Warren defeated school teacher Lauren Raper in the Republican primary. He then faced incumbent Democratic incumbent Lorene Coates in the general election. Less than 200 votes separated the candidates on election day. Because of this, losing candidate Lorene Coates asked for a recount. After the recount, Harry Warren was confirmed the victor.

North Carolina House of Representatives 77th district Republican primary election, 2010
Party	Candidate	Votes	%
Republican	Harry Warren	2,305	65.88%
Republican	Lauren Raper	1,194	34.12%
Total votes		3,499	100%

North Carolina House of Representatives 77th district general election, 2010
Party	Candidate	Votes	%
Republican	Harry Warren	9,117	50.46%
Democratic	Lorene Coates (incumbent)	8,951	49.54%
Total votes		18,068	100%
Republican gain from Democratic			

North Carolina House of Representatives
Preceded by Lorene Coates	Member of the North Carolina House of Representatives from the 77th district 2011–2019	Succeeded by Julia Craven Howard
Preceded by Carl Ford	Member of the North Carolina House of Representatives from the 76th district 2019–Present	Incumbent
