= Keith Kidwell =

American politician

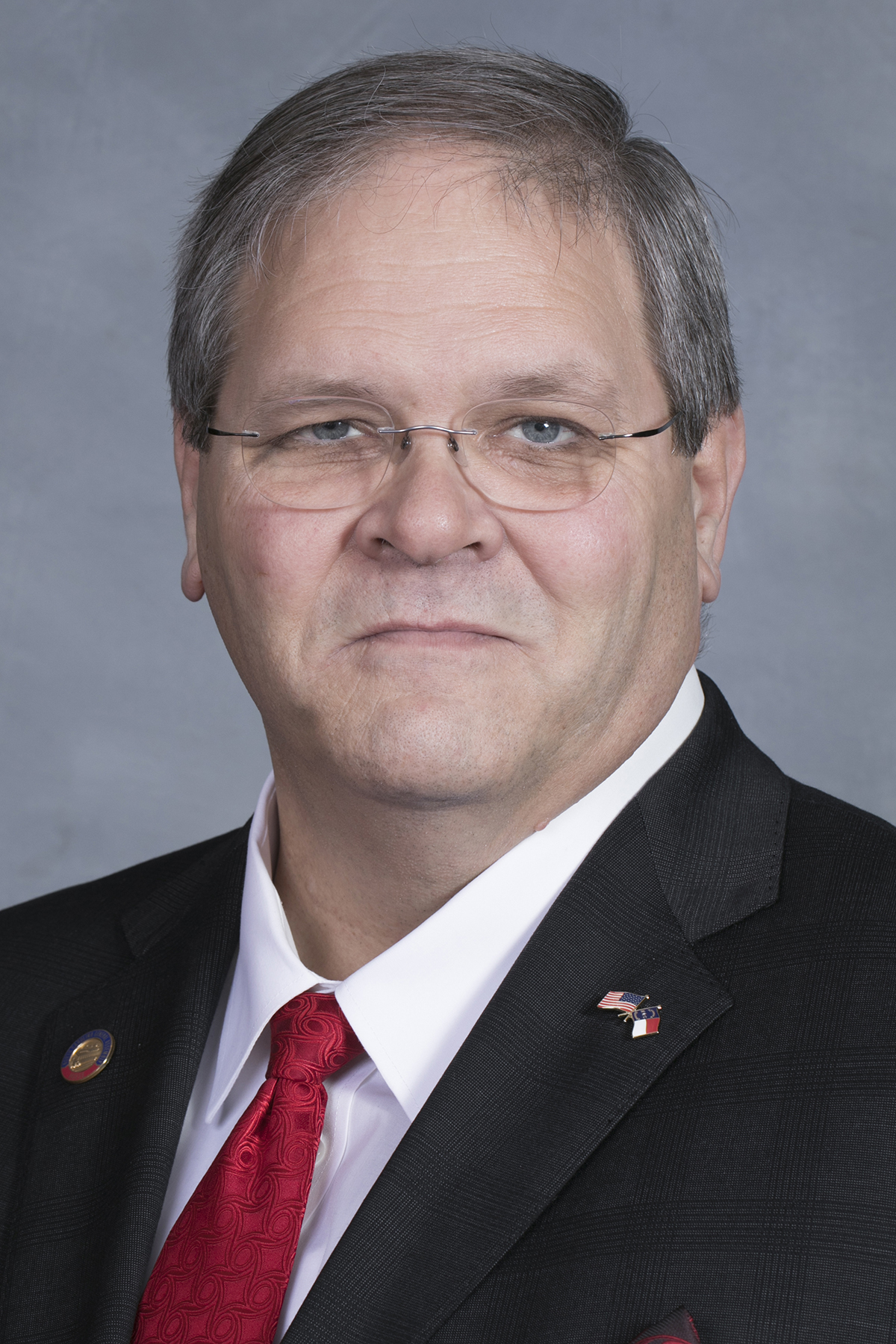
- Official portrait, 2019

Member of the North Carolina House of Representatives from the 79th district
- Incumbent
- Assumed office January 1, 2019
- Preceded by: Constituency established

Personal details
- Born: Keith D. Kidwell; June 21, 1961 (age 65) Passaic, New Jersey, U.S.
- Party: Republican
- Spouse: Victoria
- Children: 2
- Education: William Paterson College (BA)
- Occupation: Businessman Enrolled Agent, Tax Accountant, Health & Life Insurance Agent

Keith D. Kidwell (born June 21, 1961) is a Republican member of the North Carolina House of Representatives. He has represented the 79th district (including constituents in Beaufort and Craven counties) since its creation in a mid-cycle redistricting in 2019.

== Career ==
In May 2026, Kidwell introduced a bill to state that legal human life begins at fertilization.

Kidwell has been an advocate for the shrimping industry. He has referenced bills that seek regulation of guns and shrimping as Freddy Kruger bills and stated, “Just about the time you think it's dead, it's going to come back to life and try and kill you again. So I stand ready with my spike to drive through its heart.”

=== Committee assignments ===
Source:

=== 2021-2022 session ===
- Banking (Chair)
- Finance (Chair)
- Agriculture
- Commerce
- Environment
- Regulatory Reform
- Judiciary IV
- Marine Resources and Aqua Culture

=== 2019-2020 session ===
- Finance
- Commerce
- Environment
- Regulatory Reform
- Pensions and Retirement

== Involvement with the Oath Keepers ==
In late September 2021, it was revealed that Rep. Kidwell's name was among the some 38,000 people whose names appear on a membership roster of the Oath Keepers; a far-right anti-government militia, following a hack of the group's internal data. Rep. Kidwell did not comment on whether he is a member of the group or not. However, records show that Kidwell has been on the Oath Keepers' roster since at least 2012.

== Electoral history ==
=== 2022 ===
North Carolina House of Representatives 79th district Republican primary election, 2022
Party	Candidate	Votes	%
Republican	Keith Kidwell (incumbent)	8,721	83.30%
Republican	Ed Hege	1,749	16.70%
Total votes		10,470	100%

=== 2020 ===
North Carolina House of Representatives 79th district general election, 2020
Party	Candidate	Votes	%
Republican	Keith Kidwell (incumbent)	25,290	63.83%
Democratic	Nick Blount	14,330	36.17%
Total votes		39,620	100%
Republican hold			

=== 2018 ===
North Carolina House of Representatives 79th district Republican primary election, 2018
Party	Candidate	Votes	%
Republican	Keith Kidwell	4,176	78.06%
Republican	Jim Chesnutt	1,174	21.94%
Total votes		5,350	100%

North Carolina House of Representatives 79th district general election, 2018
Party	Candidate	Votes	%
Republican	Keith Kidwell	17,247	60.59%
Democratic	Jerry E. Langley	11,220	39.41%
Total votes		28,647	100%
Republican win (new seat)			

North Carolina House of Representatives
Preceded by Julia Craven Howard	Member of the North Carolina House of Representatives from the 79th district 2019–Present	Incumbent
