= W. Eugene McCombs =

American politician

Willard Eugene McCombs (16 June 1925 – 20 January 2004) was a Republican member of the North Carolina General Assembly representing the state's seventy-sixth House district (83rd and 84th) from Faith, North Carolina, including constituents in Rowan County and as Co-Chair of General Government. After first working at his father's grocery store, he enlisted in the U. S. Army at age 18 and, two years later, started serving on the Faith Board of Aldermen and eventually Rowan County Commission. A retired merchant from Faith, North Carolina, McCombs was serving in his sixth term in the state House when he died in office and one of the county's most well known public servants.

In 2015, a section of Faith Road in Faith was renamed W. Eugene McCombs Highway.

North Carolina House of Representatives
Preceded by Constituency established	Member of the North Carolina House of Representatives from the 83rd district 1993–2003	Succeeded by Tracy Walker
Preceded by Michael Harrington	Member of the North Carolina House of Representatives from the 76th district 2003–2004	Succeeded by Fred Steen II
