= Calahaln Township, Davie County, North Carolina =

Calahaln Township
- Township
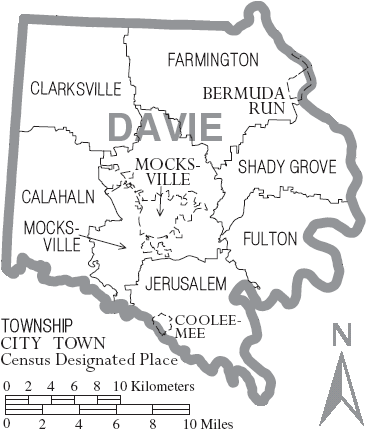
- Calahaln Township in Davie County
- Country: United States
- State: North Carolina
- County: Davie
- Established: 1868

Government
  - Type: non-functioning administrative division

Area
  - Total: 39.0 sq mi (101 km^{2})

Population (2020)U.S. Census Bureau
  - Total: 2,562
- Zip code: 27028

Calahaln Township is a non-functioning administrative division of Davie County, North Carolina, United States. By the requirements of the North Carolina Constitution of 1868, the counties were divided into townships, which included Calahaln township as one of sixteen townships in Davie County. Calahaln township is in western Davie County. The western border is the Iredell County line. The southern border is the South Yadkin River and Rowan County line. The northern and eastern borders are irregular and include portions of the Hunting Creek in on the southern end and Bear Creek on the northern end. The township was named for the Calahaln community, which was named for William Calahan or his descendants. William Calahan was in the area as early as 1778. Calahaln Mountain at 845 feet (258 m) is the highest point in Calahaln Township (35°55′32″N 80°40′10″W.

== History ==
Historical population
Census	Pop.	Note	%±
1870	1,249		—
1880	1,366		9.4%
1890	1,329		−2.7%
1900	1,262		−5.0%
1910	1,165		−7.7%
1920	1,289		10.6%
1930	1,289		0.0%
1940	1,793		39.1%
2020	2,562		—

There were very few residents in the area of this township from US Revolutionary times until before the Civil War. A road was established from Statesville to Mocksville that passed through the township in 1829 when the area of Calahaln Township was part of Rowan County until 1836. This road followed what is now U.S. Highway 64.

The following sites of interest are or have been located in Calahaln Township:

- Churches
  - Byerlys Chapel (also referred to as Hardison Chapel), organized in 1887 (35°51′32″N 80°37′45″W
  - Cavalry Baptist Church, on Davie Academy Road (35°53′30″N 80°40′42″W
  - Center Methodist-Episcopal Church, organized in 1830, near village of Center (35°54′47.9″N 80°37′12.5″W)
  - Clement Grove Church of God (35°55′29″N 80°37′56″W)
  - Hickory Grove Methodist Episcopal Church (currently known as Zion Chapel United Methodist Church), near Cleary's crossroads
  - Ijames Crossroad Baptist Church, organized in September 1897, near Ijames crossroads north of Calahaln
  - Mount Tabor Holiness Church
  - Salem United Methodist Church (35°53′11″N 80°39′57″W
  - St. Matthew's Lutheran Church, organized in 1839 (35°52′58″N 80°39′49″W
  - Turner's Grove AME Zion Church, on Davie Academy Road (35°53′30.1″N 80°40′43.8″W)
- Post offices
  - Calahaln, started on December 8, 1858, first postmaster was Charles Anderson, discontinued on August 15, 1932 (35°55′37″N 80°39′48″W
  - County Line, started March 11, 1837, first postmaster John Lunn, discontinued May 31, 1906
- Schools
  - Cherry Grove School (historical), on old State Road 64
  - Davie Academy (historical) (35°52′00″N 80°38′25″W)
  - Stroud School (historical) (35°52′28″N 80°41′04″W)
- Stores
  - A. A. Anderson Store (historical)
  - J. G. Dwiggins & Co. (historical)
  - Smoots Store (historical), on Davie Academy Road (approximately 35°52′23″N 80°38′58″W
  - Tutterow Store (historical), near village of Center, (approximately 35°54′42″N 80°37′08″W

When public schools were consolidated in the mid 1900s, there were no longer any public schools in Calahaln Township. School age children began going to public schools in Mocksville.

Boyd's Hawks Creek Private Airport is located in Calahaln Township (35°53′56.5800″N 80°37′03.5600″W).
