= Cornatzer, North Carolina =

- Unincorporated community
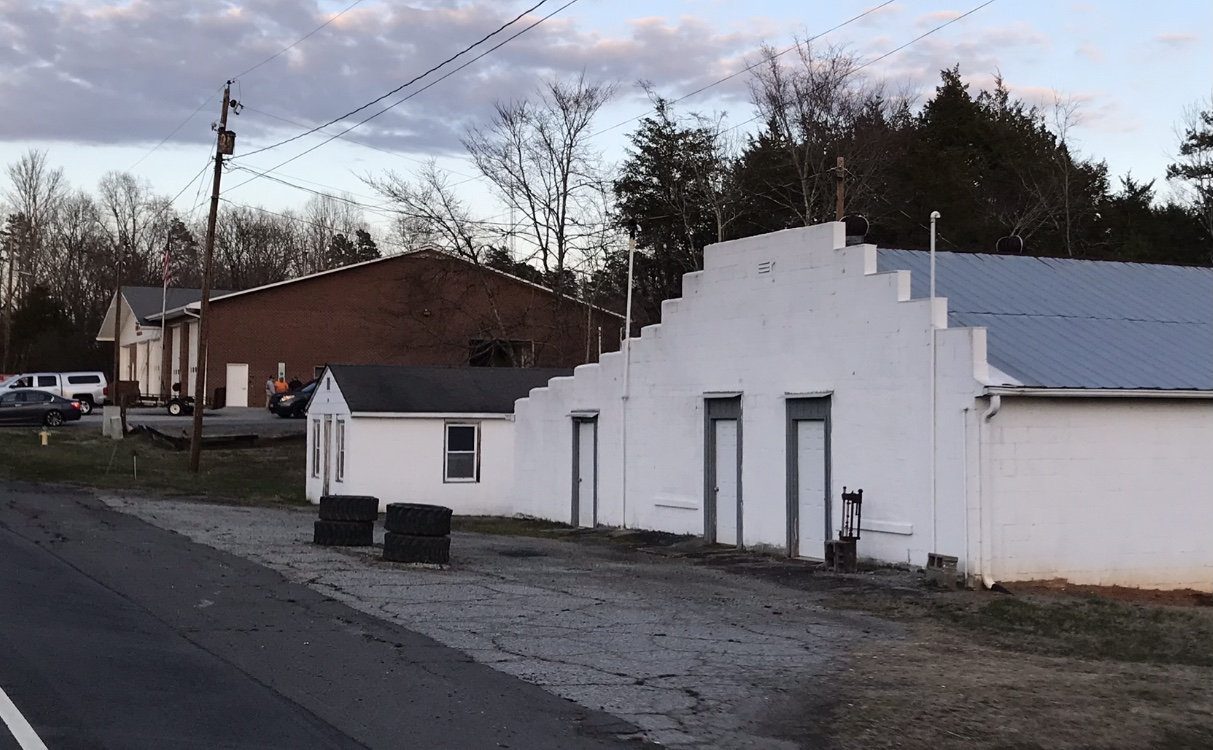

- Location within the state of North Carolina
- Coordinates: 35°55′25″N 80°28′47″W
- Country: United States
- State: North Carolina
- County: Davie County
- Elevation: 797 ft (243 m)
- Time zone: UTC-5 (Eastern (EST))
  - Summer (DST): UTC-4 (EDT)
- ZIP code: 27028
- Area code: 336
- GNIS feature ID: 983571

Cornatzer is an unincorporated community in Davie County, North Carolina, United States. It is located at the intersection Cornatzer Road (SR 1606/SR 1616) and Milling Road (SR 1600). The community is named after the Cornatzer family who resided in Advance, NC and sold their farm to R.J. Reynolds Tobacco Company.
