= Lorene T. Coates =

American politician

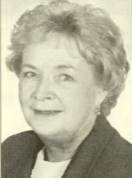
- Coates in the 2001 legislative manual

Member of the North Carolina House of Representatives
- In office January 1, 2001 – January 1, 2011
- Preceded by: Charlotte Ancher Gardner
- Succeeded by: Harry Warren
- Constituency: 35th District (2001-2003); 77th District (2003-2011)

Personal details
- Born: January 13, 1936 (age 90) Rowan County, North Carolina, U.S.
- Party: Democratic

Lorene Thomason Coates (born January 13, 1936) is an American former politician who served as a Democratic member of the North Carolina General Assembly representing the seventy-seventh House district, including constituents in Rowan county from 2001 to 2011.

A retiree from Salisbury, North Carolina, she worked for the U.S. Department of Agriculture. She has hosted a weekly radio show and for twenty years wrote a newspaper column in the Salisbury Post.

On March 30, 2006, she gained distinction by being the first Democratic member of the House to publicly call for House Speaker Jim Black, a fellow Democrat, to step down from his post as Speaker following investigations of his misconduct. Black later resigned from the House and pleaded guilty to a felony charge of public corruption.

In 2007 she announced her support for John Edwards' presidential campaign.

== Electoral history ==
North Carolina House District 35 General Election 2000
Party	Candidate	Votes	%
Democratic	Lorene T. Coates	11,026	52.04
Republican	Charlotte A. Gardner	10,163	47.96
Majority		863	4.07
Total votes		21,189	100.00

- After redistricting, Coates' House District changed from 35 to 77.

North Carolina House District 77 General Election 2002
Party	Candidate	Votes	%
Democratic	Lorene T. Coates	9,886	55.02
Republican	Charlotte A. Gardner	8,081	44.98
Majority		1804	10.05
Total votes		17,967	100.00

North Carolina House District 77 General Election 2004
Party	Candidate	Votes	%
Democratic	Lorene T. Coates	15,026	60.64
Republican	Mac Butner	9,751	39.36
Majority		5275	21.29
Total votes		24,777	100.00

North Carolina House District 77 General Election 2006
Party	Candidate	Votes	%
Democratic	Lorene T. Coates	8,279	61.68
Republican	Susan Morris	5,144	38.32
Majority		3135	23.36
Total votes		13,423	100.00

North Carolina House District 77 General Election 2008
Party	Candidate	Votes	%
Democratic	Lorene T. Coates	20,050	66.85
Republican	Ada M. Fisher	9,942	33.15
Majority		10108	33.70
Total votes		29,992	100.00

North Carolina House District 77 General Election 2010
Party	Candidate	Votes	%
Republican	Harry Warren	9,117	50.46
Democratic	Lorene T. Coates	8,951	49.54
Majority		166	0.92
Total votes		18,068	100.00

North Carolina House of Representatives
Preceded by Charlotte Ancher Gardner	Member of the North Carolina House of Representatives from the 35th district 2001–2003	Succeeded by Jennifer Weiss
Preceded by Carolyn Barnes Russell	Member of the North Carolina House of Representatives from the 77th district 2003–2011	Succeeded by Harry Warren
