= 1964 United States presidential election in North Carolina =

- November 3, 1964
- Turnout: 74% ▼

| Nominee | Lyndon B. Johnson | Barry Goldwater |
| Party | Democratic | Republican |
| Home state | Texas | Arizona |
| Running mate | Hubert Humphrey | William E. Miller |
| Electoral vote | 13 | 0 |
| Popular vote | 800,139 | 624,844 |
| Percentage | 56.15% | 43.85% |

Johnson
50–60%
60–70%
70–80%
80–90%
Goldwater
50–60%
60–70%
President before election
Lyndon B. Johnson
Democratic
Elected President
Lyndon B. Johnson
Democratic

The 1964 United States presidential election in North Carolina took place on November 3, 1964, and was part of the 1964 United States presidential election. Voters chose 13 representatives, or electors, to the Electoral College, who voted for president and vice president.

Polling initially showed Goldwater leading in North Carolina, but his farm policies, particularly his opposition to federal tobacco price support, hurt his campaign. As of the 2024 presidential election, this is the last election when Wayne, Moore, and Lenoir counties voted for a Democratic presidential candidate, while Wake and Watauga counties would not vote Democratic again until Bill Clinton won them in 1992.

== Results ==
1964 United States presidential election in North Carolina
| Party | Candidate | Votes | Percentage | Electoral votes |
|---|---|---|---|---|
| Democratic | Lyndon B. Johnson (incumbent) | 800,139 | 56.15% | 13 |
| Republican | Barry Goldwater | 624,844 | 43.85% | 0 |
| Totals | | 1,424,983 | 100.0% | 13 |
| Voter turnout | | | | — |

=== Results by county ===
| County | Lyndon B. Johnson Democratic | | Barry Goldwater Republican | | Margin | | Total |
| County | # | % | # | % | # | % | Total |
|---|---|---|---|---|---|---|---|
| Alamance | 15,397 | 50.36% | 15,177 | 49.64% | 220 | 0.72% | 30,574 |
| Alexander | 3,722 | 49.75% | 3,760 | 50.25% | −38 | −0.50% | 7,482 |
| Alleghany | 2,368 | 60.09% | 1,573 | 39.91% | 795 | 20.18% | 3,941 |
| Anson | 4,144 | 70.66% | 1,721 | 29.34% | 2,423 | 41.32% | 5,865 |
| Ashe | 4,965 | 54.23% | 4,191 | 45.77% | 774 | 8.45% | 9,156 |
| Avery | 1,523 | 36.44% | 2,656 | 63.56% | −1,133 | −27.12% | 4,179 |
| Beaufort | 6,090 | 62.88% | 3,595 | 37.12% | 2,495 | 25.76% | 9,685 |
| Bertie | 3,332 | 78.16% | 931 | 21.84% | 2,401 | 56.32% | 4,263 |
| Bladen | 4,516 | 67.55% | 2,169 | 32.45% | 2,347 | 35.10% | 6,685 |
| Brunswick | 4,240 | 53.26% | 3,721 | 46.74% | 519 | 6.52% | 7,961 |
| Buncombe | 31,623 | 62.01% | 19,372 | 37.99% | 12,251 | 24.02% | 50,995 |
| Burke | 12,815 | 55.97% | 10,081 | 44.03% | 2,734 | 11.94% | 22,896 |
| Cabarrus | 11,921 | 47.50% | 13,178 | 52.50% | −1,257 | −5.00% | 25,099 |
| Caldwell | 10,846 | 55.40% | 8,733 | 44.60% | 2,113 | 10.80% | 19,579 |
| Camden | 870 | 61.97% | 534 | 38.03% | 336 | 23.94% | 1,404 |
| Carteret | 6,231 | 59.23% | 4,289 | 40.77% | 1,942 | 18.46% | 10,520 |
| Caswell | 2,513 | 58.36% | 1,793 | 41.64% | 720 | 16.72% | 4,306 |
| Catawba | 15,814 | 48.02% | 17,116 | 51.98% | −1,302 | −3.96% | 32,930 |
| Chatham | 5,295 | 56.29% | 4,111 | 43.71% | 1,184 | 12.58% | 9,406 |
| Cherokee | 3,823 | 55.17% | 3,106 | 44.83% | 717 | 10.35% | 6,929 |
| Chowan | 1,696 | 68.30% | 787 | 31.70% | 909 | 36.60% | 2,483 |
| Clay | 1,457 | 53.12% | 1,286 | 46.88% | 171 | 6.24% | 2,743 |
| Cleveland | 10,836 | 57.92% | 7,874 | 42.08% | 2,962 | 15.84% | 18,710 |
| Columbus | 9,004 | 66.82% | 4,471 | 33.18% | 4,533 | 33.64% | 13,475 |
| Craven | 7,422 | 61.27% | 4,691 | 38.73% | 2,731 | 22.54% | 12,113 |
| Cumberland | 13,864 | 60.39% | 9,093 | 39.61% | 4,771 | 20.78% | 22,957 |
| Currituck | 1,455 | 66.26% | 741 | 33.74% | 714 | 32.52% | 2,196 |
| Dare | 1,476 | 63.00% | 867 | 37.00% | 609 | 26.00% | 2,343 |
| Davidson | 13,735 | 44.27% | 17,292 | 55.73% | −3,557 | −11.46% | 31,027 |
| Davie | 3,086 | 40.90% | 4,460 | 59.10% | −1,374 | −18.20% | 7,546 |
| Duplin | 7,169 | 65.23% | 3,821 | 34.77% | 3,348 | 30.46% | 10,990 |
| Durham | 22,874 | 59.98% | 15,264 | 40.02% | 7,610 | 19.96% | 38,138 |
| Edgecombe | 7,834 | 66.58% | 3,932 | 33.42% | 3,902 | 33.16% | 11,766 |
| Forsyth | 31,615 | 51.08% | 30,276 | 48.92% | 1,339 | 2.16% | 61,891 |
| Franklin | 4,554 | 68.47% | 2,097 | 31.53% | 2,457 | 36.94% | 6,651 |
| Gaston | 20,197 | 54.11% | 17,129 | 45.89% | 3,068 | 8.22% | 37,326 |
| Gates | 1,702 | 75.38% | 556 | 24.62% | 1,146 | 50.76% | 2,258 |
| Graham | 1,737 | 55.41% | 1,398 | 44.59% | 339 | 10.82% | 3,135 |
| Granville | 4,596 | 63.66% | 2,624 | 36.34% | 1,972 | 27.32% | 7,220 |
| Greene | 2,712 | 75.06% | 901 | 24.94% | 1,811 | 50.12% | 3,613 |
| Guilford | 39,969 | 52.87% | 35,635 | 47.13% | 4,334 | 5.74% | 75,604 |
| Halifax | 8,952 | 65.30% | 4,757 | 34.70% | 4,195 | 30.60% | 13,709 |
| Harnett | 7,477 | 55.97% | 5,883 | 44.03% | 1,594 | 11.94% | 13,360 |
| Haywood | 10,664 | 65.67% | 5,575 | 34.33% | 5,089 | 31.34% | 16,239 |
| Henderson | 6,066 | 40.86% | 8,780 | 59.14% | −2,714 | −18.28% | 14,846 |
| Hertford | 3,953 | 79.91% | 994 | 20.09% | 2,959 | 59.82% | 4,947 |
| Hoke | 2,254 | 74.32% | 779 | 25.68% | 1,475 | 48.64% | 3,033 |
| Hyde | 1,127 | 68.68% | 514 | 31.32% | 613 | 37.36% | 1,641 |
| Iredell | 11,231 | 46.56% | 12,892 | 53.44% | −1,661 | −6.88% | 24,123 |
| Jackson | 4,905 | 60.65% | 3,183 | 39.35% | 1,722 | 21.30% | 8,088 |
| Johnston | 10,326 | 57.85% | 7,523 | 42.15% | 2,803 | 15.70% | 17,849 |
| Jones | 2,129 | 73.29% | 776 | 26.71% | 1,353 | 46.58% | 2,905 |
| Lee | 4,730 | 63.21% | 2,753 | 36.79% | 1,977 | 26.42% | 7,483 |
| Lenoir | 7,617 | 57.56% | 5,617 | 42.44% | 2,000 | 15.12% | 13,234 |
| Lincoln | 7,304 | 55.45% | 5,869 | 44.55% | 1,435 | 10.90% | 13,173 |
| Macon | 3,774 | 56.55% | 2,900 | 43.45% | 874 | 13.10% | 6,674 |
| Madison | 3,829 | 53.44% | 3,336 | 46.56% | 493 | 6.88% | 7,165 |
| Martin | 4,821 | 76.14% | 1,511 | 23.86% | 3,310 | 52.28% | 6,332 |
| McDowell | 6,314 | 60.20% | 4,174 | 39.80% | 2,140 | 20.40% | 10,488 |
| Mecklenburg | 49,582 | 51.56% | 46,589 | 48.44% | 2,993 | 3.12% | 96,171 |
| Mitchell | 1,736 | 34.73% | 3,263 | 65.27% | −1,527 | −30.54% | 4,999 |
| Montgomery | 3,933 | 53.74% | 3,385 | 46.26% | 548 | 7.48% | 7,318 |
| Moore | 6,384 | 55.29% | 5,162 | 44.71% | 1,222 | 10.58% | 11,546 |
| Nash | 9,163 | 58.89% | 6,396 | 41.11% | 2,767 | 17.78% | 15,559 |
| New Hanover | 12,584 | 50.90% | 12,140 | 49.10% | 444 | 1.80% | 24,724 |
| Northampton | 5,046 | 80.96% | 1,187 | 19.04% | 3,859 | 61.92% | 6,233 |
| Onslow | 5,955 | 61.23% | 3,771 | 38.77% | 2,184 | 22.46% | 9,726 |
| Orange | 9,206 | 61.41% | 5,785 | 38.59% | 3,421 | 22.82% | 14,991 |
| Pamlico | 1,864 | 64.28% | 1,036 | 35.72% | 828 | 28.55% | 2,900 |
| Pasquotank | 4,269 | 64.21% | 2,380 | 35.79% | 1,889 | 28.42% | 6,649 |
| Pender | 3,205 | 62.04% | 1,961 | 37.96% | 1,244 | 24.08% | 5,166 |
| Perquimans | 1,458 | 60.78% | 941 | 39.22% | 517 | 21.56% | 2,399 |
| Person | 4,740 | 68.68% | 2,162 | 31.32% | 2,578 | 37.36% | 6,902 |
| Pitt | 11,317 | 68.73% | 5,149 | 31.27% | 6,168 | 37.46% | 16,466 |
| Polk | 3,017 | 52.18% | 2,765 | 47.82% | 252 | 4.36% | 5,782 |
| Randolph | 10,638 | 43.64% | 13,739 | 56.36% | −3,101 | −12.72% | 24,377 |
| Richmond | 8,516 | 73.17% | 3,123 | 26.83% | 5,393 | 46.34% | 11,639 |
| Robeson | 13,796 | 79.35% | 3,591 | 20.65% | 10,205 | 58.70% | 17,387 |
| Rockingham | 11,432 | 55.78% | 9,063 | 44.22% | 2,369 | 11.56% | 20,495 |
| Rowan | 14,934 | 50.22% | 14,804 | 49.78% | 130 | 0.44% | 29,738 |
| Rutherford | 9,541 | 57.28% | 7,115 | 42.72% | 2,426 | 14.56% | 16,656 |
| Sampson | 8,067 | 51.38% | 7,634 | 48.62% | 433 | 2.76% | 15,701 |
| Scotland | 3,844 | 75.77% | 1,229 | 24.23% | 2,615 | 51.54% | 5,073 |
| Stanly | 7,931 | 47.05% | 8,924 | 52.95% | −993 | −5.90% | 16,855 |
| Stokes | 4,898 | 51.22% | 4,664 | 48.78% | 234 | 2.44% | 9,562 |
| Surry | 9,810 | 55.17% | 7,970 | 44.83% | 1,840 | 10.34% | 17,780 |
| Swain | 2,294 | 59.93% | 1,534 | 40.07% | 760 | 19.86% | 3,828 |
| Transylvania | 4,483 | 55.83% | 3,547 | 44.17% | 936 | 11.66% | 8,030 |
| Tyrrell | 996 | 72.70% | 374 | 27.30% | 622 | 45.40% | 1,370 |
| Union | 7,208 | 63.02% | 4,229 | 36.98% | 2,979 | 26.04% | 11,437 |
| Vance | 5,186 | 60.04% | 3,452 | 39.96% | 1,734 | 20.08% | 8,638 |
| Wake | 31,653 | 58.41% | 22,542 | 41.59% | 9,111 | 16.82% | 54,195 |
| Warren | 2,849 | 59.88% | 1,909 | 40.12% | 940 | 19.76% | 4,758 |
| Washington | 2,505 | 68.65% | 1,144 | 31.35% | 1,361 | 37.30% | 3,649 |
| Watauga | 4,031 | 50.62% | 3,932 | 49.38% | 99 | 1.24% | 7,963 |
| Wayne | 9,791 | 56.45% | 7,555 | 43.55% | 2,236 | 12.90% | 17,346 |
| Wilkes | 9,176 | 45.45% | 11,014 | 54.55% | −1,838 | −9.10% | 20,190 |
| Wilson | 7,238 | 59.13% | 5,002 | 40.87% | 2,236 | 18.26% | 12,240 |
| Yadkin | 3,638 | 38.30% | 5,860 | 61.70% | −2,222 | −23.40% | 9,498 |
| Yancey | 3,714 | 64.95% | 2,004 | 35.05% | 1,710 | 29.90% | 5,718 |
| Totals | 800,139 | 56.15% | 624,844 | 43.85% | 175,295 | 12.30% | 1,424,983 |

=== Results by congressional district ===
Johnson carried 8 of the 9 congressional districts, including one that elected a Republican.

| District | Goldwater | Johnson |
|---|---|---|
| 1st | 30.9% | 69.1% |
| 2nd | 35.7% | 64.3% |
| 3rd | 41.1% | 58.9% |
| 4th | 47% | 53% |
| 5th | 46.9% | 53.1% |
| 6th | 45.1% | 54.9% |
| 7th | 36.7% | 63.3% |
| 8th | 44.2% | 55.8% |
| 9th | 51.1% | 48.9% |
| 10th | 47.4% | 52.6% |
| 11th | 41.8% | 58.2% |

== Works cited ==
- Black, Earl; Black, Merle (1992). The Vital South: How Presidents Are Elected. Harvard University Press. ISBN 0674941306.
