= Julia C. Howard =

American politician

Julia Howard
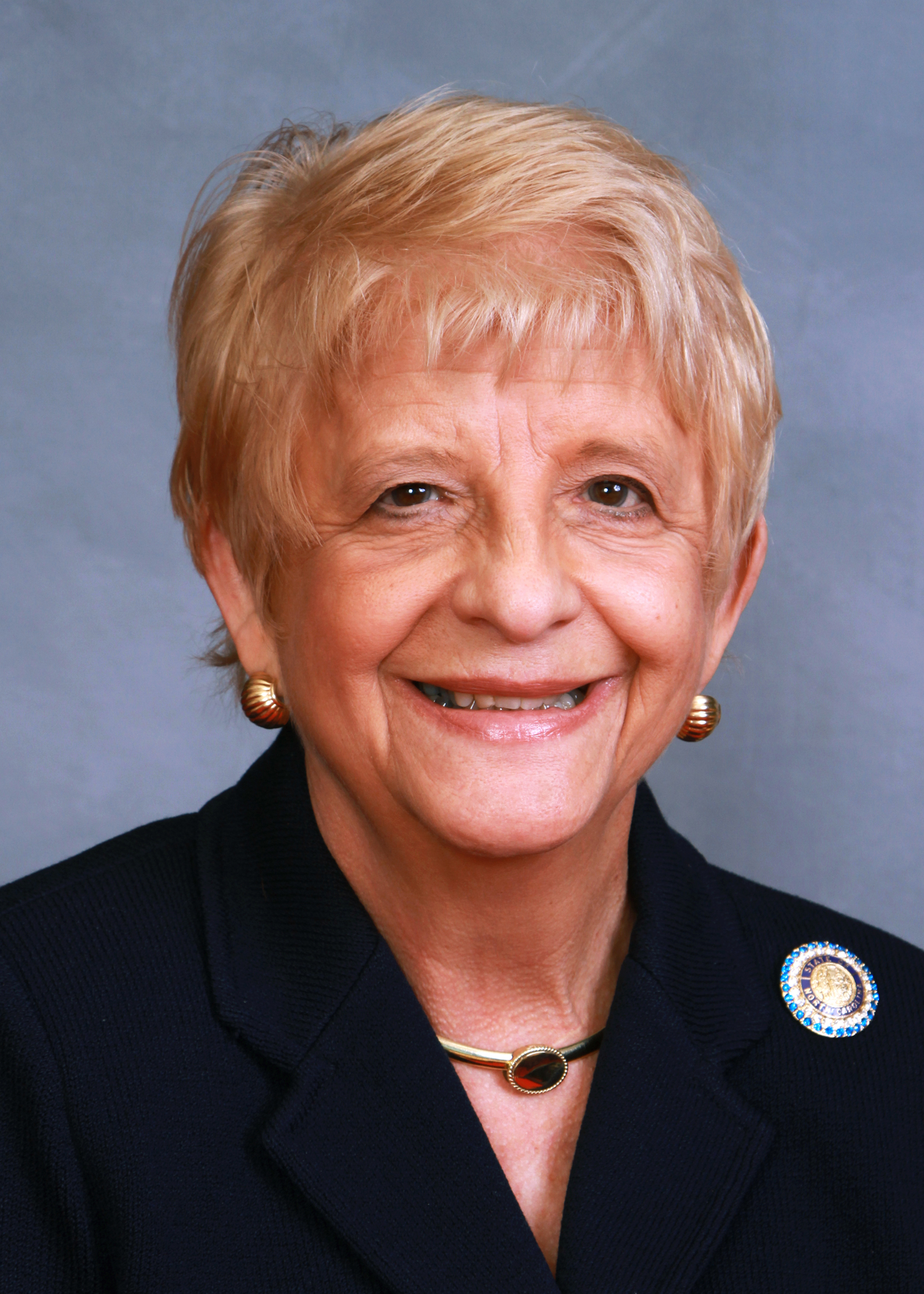

Member of the North Carolina House of Representatives
- Incumbent
- Assumed office January 1, 1989
- Preceded by: Betsy Lane Cochrane
- Constituency: 37th District (1989–1993); 74th District (1993–2003); 79th District (2003–2019); 77th District (2019–Present)

Personal details
- Born: August 20, 1944 (age 82) Rowan County, North Carolina, U.S.
- Party: Republican
- Education: Salem College
- Occupation: Appraiser, Realtor
- Website: http://www.rephoward.com/
- NC General AssemblyProject Vote Smart

Julia Craven Howard (born August 20, 1944) is a Republican member of the North Carolina General Assembly representing the state's seventy-seventh House district, including constituents in Forsyth and Davie counties. She is a realtor from Mocksville, North Carolina. She earned her degree from Salem College in two years.

== Electoral history ==
=== 2020 ===
North Carolina House of Representatives 77th district general election, 2020
Party	Candidate	Votes	%
Republican	Juila Craven Howard (incumbent)	35,222	74.65%
Democratic	Keith Townsend	11,963	25.35%
Total votes		47,185	100%
Republican hold			

=== 2018 ===
North Carolina House of Representatives 77th district general election, 2018
Party	Candidate	Votes	%
Republican	Juila Craven Howard (incumbent)	23,654	73.37%
Democratic	Bonnie Dawn Clark	8,584	26.63%
Total votes		32,238	100%
Republican hold			

=== 2016 ===
North Carolina House of Representatives th district general election, 2016
Party	Candidate	Votes	%
Republican	Julia Craven Howard (incumbent)	31,255	100%
Total votes		31,255	100%
Republican hold			

=== 2014 ===
North Carolina House of Representatives th district general election, 2014
Party	Candidate	Votes	%
Republican	Julia Craven Howard (incumbent)	18,448	70.25%
Democratic	Cristina Victoria Vazquez	7,811	29.75%
Total votes		26,259	100%
Republican hold			

=== 2012 ===
North Carolina House of Representatives 79th district Republican primary election, 2012
Party	Candidate	Votes	%
Republican	Julia Craven Howard (incumbent)	9,685	70.31%
Republican	Bill Whiteheart	4,089	29.69%
Total votes		13,774	100%

North Carolina House of Representatives 79th district general election, 2012
Party	Candidate	Votes	%
Republican	Julia Craven Howard (incumbent)	27,749	70.06%
Democratic	Cristina Victoria Vazquez	11,859	29.94%
Total votes		39,608	100%
Republican hold			

=== 2010 ===
North Carolina House of Representatives th district general election, 2010
Party	Candidate	Votes	%
Republican	Julia Craven Howard (incumbent)	17,006	100%
Total votes		17,006	100%
Republican hold			

=== 2008 ===
North Carolina House of Representatives th district general election, 2008
Party	Candidate	Votes	%
Republican	Julia Craven Howard (incumbent)	25,401	100%
Total votes		25,401	100%
Republican hold			

=== 2006 ===
North Carolina House of Representatives 79th district Republican primary election, 2006
Party	Candidate	Votes	%
Republican	Julia Craven Howard (incumbent)	4,101	100%
Republican	Frank Mitchell	0	0.00%
Total votes		4,101	100%

North Carolina House of Representatives 79th district general election, 2006
Party	Candidate	Votes	%
Republican	Julia Craven Howard (incumbent)	12,553	100%
Total votes		12,553	100%
Republican hold			

=== 2004 ===
North Carolina House of Representatives 79th district Republican primary election, 2004
Party	Candidate	Votes	%
Republican	Julia Craven Howard (incumbent)	3,929	53.07%
Republican	Frank Mitchell (incumbent)	3,474	46.93%
Total votes		7,403	100%

North Carolina House of Representatives 79th district general election, 2004
Party	Candidate	Votes	%
Republican	Julia Craven Howard (incumbent)	21,225	100%
Total votes		21,225	100%
Republican hold			

=== 2002 ===
North Carolina House of Representatives 79th district Republican primary election, 2002
Party	Candidate	Votes	%
Republican	Julia Craven Howard (incumbent)	5,387	73.33%
Republican	Mike Morris	1,959	26.67%
Total votes		7,346	100%

North Carolina House of Representatives 79th district general election, 2002
Party	Candidate	Votes	%
Republican	Julia Craven Howard (incumbent)	15,412	86.70%
Libertarian	Mike Holland	2,364	13.30%
Total votes		17,776	100%
Republican hold			

=== 2000 ===
North Carolina House of Representatives 74th district Republican primary election, 2000
Party	Candidate	Votes	%
Republican	Julia Craven Howard (incumbent)	5,111	79.04%
Republican	Mike Morris	1,355	20.96%
Total votes		6,466	100%

North Carolina House of Representatives 74th district general election, 2000
Party	Candidate	Votes	%
Republican	Julia Craven Howard (incumbent)	22,773	100%
Total votes		22,773	100%
Republican hold			

North Carolina House of Representatives
Preceded by Betsy Lane Cochrane	Member of the North Carolina House of Representatives from the 37th district 1989–1993; Served alongside: Charles Lemuel Cromer, Joe H. Hege Jr., Jerry Dockham	Succeeded by Paul Reeves McCrary
Preceded by Constituency established	Member of the North Carolina House of Representatives from the 74th district 1993–2003	Succeeded by Linda Johnson
Preceded by William Wainwright	Member of the North Carolina House of Representatives from the 79th district 2003–2019	Succeeded by Keith Kidwell
Preceded by Harry Warren	Member of the North Carolina House of Representatives from the 77th district 2019–Present	Incumbent
