= North Carolina's 79th House district =

American legislative district

North Carolina's 79th State House of Representatives district
Representative
Keith Kidwell; R–Chocowinity
- Demographics: 72% White; 17% Black; 8% Hispanic; 3% Multiracial
- Population (2024): 85,194

North Carolina's 79th House district is one of 120 districts in the North Carolina House of Representatives. It has been represented by Republican Keith Kidwell since 2019.

== Geography ==
Since 2023, the district has included all of Beaufort, Pamlico, and Hyde counties, as well as most of Dare County. The district overlaps with the 1st, 2nd, and 3rd Senate districts.

== District officeholders ==
Representative	Party	Dates	Notes	Counties
District created January 1, 1993.
William Wainwright (Havelock)	Democratic	January 1, 1993 – January 1, 2003	Redistricted from the 3rd district. Redistricted to the 12th district.	1993–2003; Parts of Pamlico, Craven, Jones, and Lenoir counties.
Julia Craven Howard (Mocksville)	Republican	January 1, 2003 – January 1, 2019	Redistricted from the 74th district. Redistricted to the 77th district.	2003–2005; All of Davie County. Part of Davidson and Iredell counties.
Julia Craven Howard (Mocksville)	Republican	January 1, 2003 – January 1, 2019	Redistricted from the 74th district. Redistricted to the 77th district.	2005–2013; All of Davie County. Part of Iredell County.
Julia Craven Howard (Mocksville)	Republican	January 1, 2003 – January 1, 2019	Redistricted from the 74th district. Redistricted to the 77th district.	2013–2019; All of Davie County. Part of Forsyth County.
Keith Kidwell (Chocowinity)	Republican	January 1, 2019 – Present	Lost re-nomination.	2019–2023; All of Beaufort County. Part of Craven County.
Keith Kidwell (Chocowinity)	Republican	January 1, 2019 – Present	Lost re-nomination.	2023–Present; All of Beaufort, Pamlico, and Hyde counties. Part of Dare County.

== Election results ==
=== 2026 ===
North Carolina House of Representatives 79th district Republican primary election, 2026
Party	Candidate	Votes	%
Republican	Darren Armstrong	7,447	52.27%
Republican	Keith Kidwell (incumbent)	6,799	47.73%
Total votes		14,246	100%

North Carolina House of Representatives 79th district general election, 2026
Party	Candidate	Votes	%
Republican	Darren Armstrong		100%
Total votes			100%
Republican hold			

=== 2024 ===
North Carolina House of Representatives 79th district general election, 2024
Party	Candidate	Votes	%
Republican	Keith Kidwell (incumbent)	32,111	63.24%
Democratic	Mary Beedle	18,667	36.76%
Total votes		50,778	100%
Republican hold			

=== 2022 ===
North Carolina House of Representatives 79th district Republican primary election, 2022
Party	Candidate	Votes	%
Republican	Keith Kidwell (incumbent)	8,721	83.30%
Republican	Ed Hege	1,749	16.70%
Total votes		10,470	100%

North Carolina House of Representatives 79th district general election, 2022
Party	Candidate	Votes	%
Republican	Keith Kidwell (incumbent)	26,309	100%
Total votes		26,309	100%
Republican hold			

=== 2020 ===
North Carolina House of Representatives th district general election, 2020
Party	Candidate	Votes	%
Republican	Keith Kidwell (incumbent)	25,290	63.83%
Democratic	Nick Blount	14,330	36.17%
Total votes		39,620	100%
Republican hold			

=== 2018 ===
North Carolina House of Representatives 79th district Republican primary election, 2018
Party	Candidate	Votes	%
Republican	Keith Kidwell	4,176	78.06%
Republican	Jim Chesnutt	1,174	21.94%
Total votes		5,350	100%

North Carolina House of Representatives 79th district general election, 2018
Party	Candidate	Votes	%
Republican	Keith Kidwell	17,247	60.59%
Democratic	Jerry E. Langley	11,220	39.41%
Total votes		28,647	100%
Republican win (new seat)			

=== 2016 ===
North Carolina House of Representatives 79th district general election, 2016
Party	Candidate	Votes	%
Republican	Julia Craven Howard (incumbent)	31,255	100%
Total votes		31,255	100%
Republican hold			

=== 2014 ===
North Carolina House of Representatives th district general election, 2014
Party	Candidate	Votes	%
Republican	Julia Craven Howard (incumbent)	18,448	70.25%
Democratic	Cristina Victoria Vazquez	7,811	29.75%
Total votes		26,259	100%
Republican hold			

=== 2012 ===
North Carolina House of Representatives 79th district Republican primary election, 2012
Party	Candidate	Votes	%
Republican	Julia Craven Howard (incumbent)	9,685	70.31%
Republican	Bill Whiteheart	4,089	29.69%
Total votes		13,774	100%

North Carolina House of Representatives 79th district general election, 2012
Party	Candidate	Votes	%
Republican	Julia Craven Howard (incumbent)	27,749	70.06%
Democratic	Cristina Victoria Vazquez	11,859	29.94%
Total votes		39,608	100%
Republican hold			

=== 2010 ===
North Carolina House of Representatives th district general election, 2010
Party	Candidate	Votes	%
Republican	Julia Craven Howard (incumbent)	17,006	100%
Total votes		17,006	100%
Republican hold			

=== 2008 ===
North Carolina House of Representatives th district general election, 2008
Party	Candidate	Votes	%
Republican	Julia Craven Howard (incumbent)	25,401	100%
Total votes		25,401	100%
Republican hold			

=== 2006 ===
North Carolina House of Representatives 79th district Republican primary election, 2006
Party	Candidate	Votes	%
Republican	Julia Craven Howard (incumbent)	4,101	100%
Republican	Frank Mitchell	0	0.00%
Total votes		4,101	100%

North Carolina House of Representatives 79th district general election, 2006
Party	Candidate	Votes	%
Republican	Julia Craven Howard (incumbent)	12,553	100%
Total votes		12,553	100%
Republican hold			

=== 2004 ===
North Carolina House of Representatives 79th district Republican primary election, 2004
Party	Candidate	Votes	%
Republican	Julia Craven Howard (incumbent)	3,929	53.07%
Republican	Frank Mitchell (incumbent)	3,474	46.93%
Total votes		7,403	100%

North Carolina House of Representatives 79th district general election, 2004
Party	Candidate	Votes	%
Republican	Julia Craven Howard (incumbent)	21,225	100%
Total votes		21,225	100%
Republican hold			

=== 2002 ===
North Carolina House of Representatives 79th district Republican primary election, 2002
Party	Candidate	Votes	%
Republican	Julia Craven Howard (incumbent)	5,387	73.33%
Republican	Mike Morris	1,959	26.67%
Total votes		7,346	100%

North Carolina House of Representatives 79th district general election, 2002
Party	Candidate	Votes	%
Republican	Julia Craven Howard (incumbent)	15,412	86.70%
Libertarian	Mike Holland	2,364	13.30%
Total votes		17,776	100%
Republican hold			

=== 2000 ===
North Carolina House of Representatives 79th district general election, 2000
Party	Candidate	Votes	%
Democratic	William Wainwright (incumbent)	14,665	100%
Total votes		14,665	100%
Democratic hold			
