= Sheffield, North Carolina =

Community in North Carolina, US

The community of Sheffield is located in western Davie County, North Carolina, United States. It is in Clarksville Township on the edge of Calahaln Township. Sheffield is located at 35°57′59″N 80°40′48″W.

== History ==
Thomas Madison Smith was the only postmaster for the Sheffield Post Office starting from February 1, 1893, until January 2, 1907, when the post office was discontinued. The post office was also a store supposedly built before 1894. Where the name came from has apparently been lost to history. A mercantile was opened in 1948 by Wade and JT Smith, along with a furniture and upholstery business.

== Sheffield today ==
Sheffield-Calahaln Volunteer Fire Department is the center of the community as in many rural parts of North Carolina. The Community Center is available for public use. Sheffield Pallet Company is the only active business today. What was once the Sheffield Music Hall, on the corner of Turkey Foot rd. and Sheffield rd., was owned and operated by John Henry and Ethel Reeves. It featured live bluegrass music and dancing. It was sold out of the family in 2023. The local weekly newspaper, The Davie County Enterprise-Record, features a Sheffield-Calahaln news column each week that highlights current events and other community information.
