= Davie County, North Carolina =

County in North Carolina, United States

- County
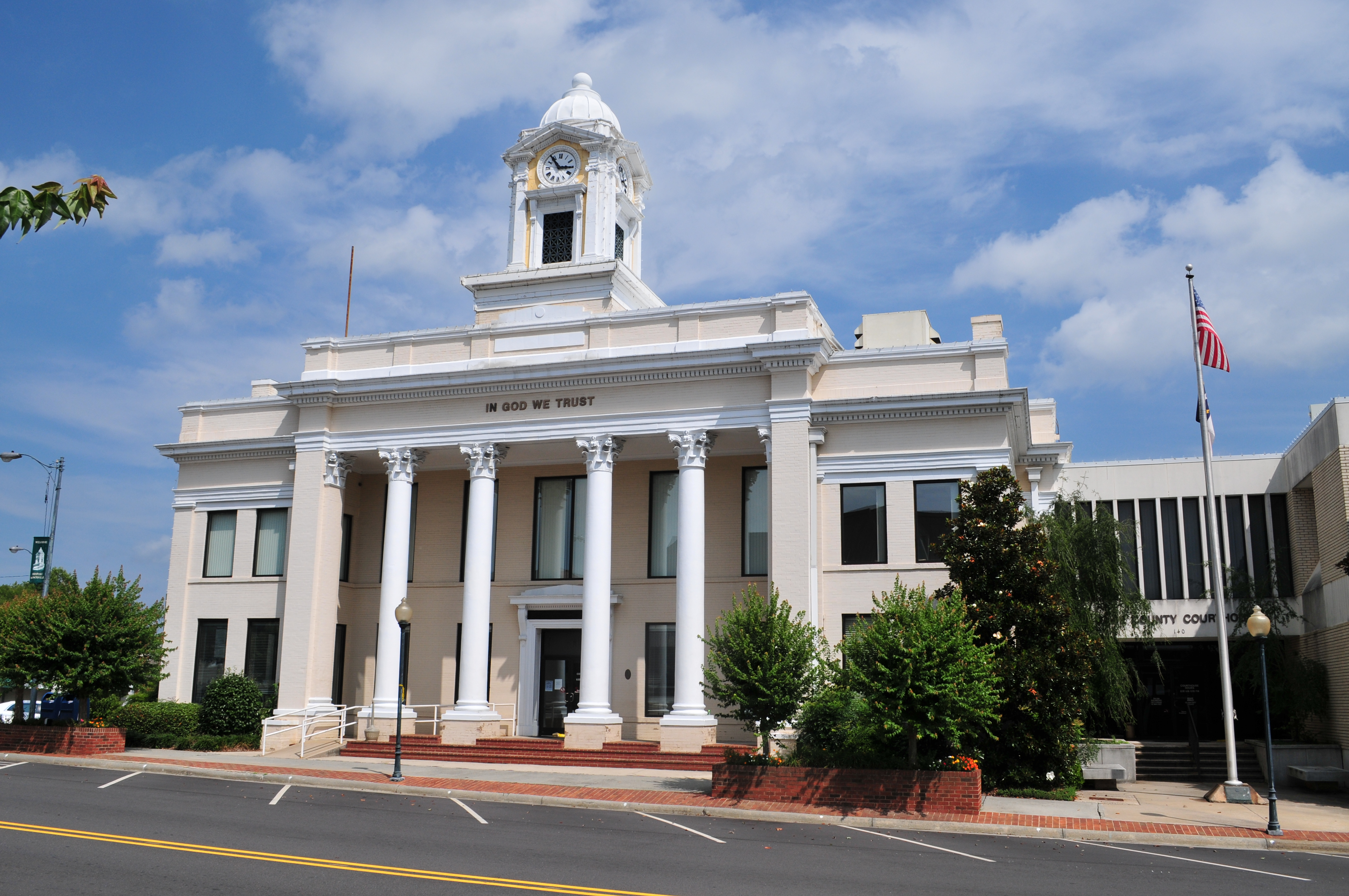
- Davie County Courthouse

- Flag Seal Logo
- Motto: "You Belong Here"
- Location within the U.S. state of North Carolina
- Interactive map of Davie County, North Carolina
- Coordinates: 35.93°N 80.54°W
- Country: United States
- State: North Carolina
- Founded: 1836
- Named for: William R. Davie
- Seat: Mocksville
- Largest community: Mocksville

Area
  - Total: 266.60 sq mi (690.5 km^{2})
  - Land: 263.70 sq mi (683.0 km^{2})
  - Water: 2.90 sq mi (7.5 km^{2}) 1.09%

Population (2020)
  - Total: 42,712
  - Estimate (2025): 45,855 ▲
  - Density: 161.97/sq mi (62.54/km^{2})
- Time zone: UTC−5 (Eastern)
  - Summer (DST): UTC−4 (EDT)
- Congressional district: 6th
- Website: www.daviecountync.gov

Davie County is a county located in the U.S. state of North Carolina. As of the 2020 census, the population was 42,712. Its county seat is Mocksville.

Davie County is included in the Winston-Salem, NC Metropolitan Statistical Area, which is also included in the Greensboro–Winston-Salem–High Point, NC Combined Statistical Area.

== History ==
Present day Davie County (then part of Anson and Rowan) was the area of early settlement circa 1760 when the Morgan and Martha Bryan large extended family, including granddaughter nine-year-old Rebecca, became the first permanent white pioneers and settlers in the Forks of the Yadkin River after coming down the Great Wagon Road and crossing the Shallow Ford on the Yadkin River. Other settlers quickly followed including Squire and Sarah Boone, whose son Daniel would marry Rebecca Bryan and together with their large family lead the migration across the Cumberland Gap into the western frontier, having been trained how to tame a wilderness by their parents in what is now Davie County.

The county was formed in 1836, carved out from Rowan County. It claimed the land that lay within the Forks of the Yadkin and was named for William R. Davie, Governor of North Carolina from 1798 to 1799. Mocksville, at the intersection of three major roads, was created on Mocks Old Field (first white man owned by pioneer Caspar Sain) to be the county seat. Two courthouses have served the county on its historic town square.

During the Civil War, 1,147 soldiers (nearly one fourth of the population) from Davie County fought in the American Civil War for the Confederate States of America.

In 2023, Davie County won the All-America City Award for the county's youth involvement and health and wellness programs. Some notable youth organizations included the SURF Board, Ignite Davie, the CTE programs, and the Davie Respect Initiative.

== Geography ==
According to the U.S. Census Bureau, the county has a total area of 266.60 square miles (690.5 km^{2}), of which 263.70 square miles (683.0 km^{2}) is land and 2.90 square miles (7.5 km^{2}) (1.1%) is water.

=== State and local protected areas ===
- Perkins Game Land
- Yadkin River Game Land (part)

=== Major water bodies ===
- Bear Creek
- Buffalo Creek
- Carter Creek
- Chinquapin Creek
- Dutchman Creek
- Fourth Creek
- Greasy Creek
- Hunting Creek
- Little Bear Creek
- Little Creek
- Second Creek
- South Yadkin River
- Sugar Creek
- Third Creek
- Yadkin River
- Withrow Creek

=== Adjacent counties ===
- Yadkin County - north
- Forsyth County - northeast
- Davidson County - east
- Rowan County - south
- Iredell County - west

=== Major highways ===
- I-40
- US 64
- US 158
- US 601
- NC 801
- NC 901

== Demographics ==
Historical population
Census	Pop.	Note	%±
1840	7,574		—
1850	7,866		3.9%
1860	8,494		8.0%
1870	9,620		13.3%
1880	11,096		15.3%
1890	11,621		4.7%
1900	12,115		4.3%
1910	13,394		10.6%
1920	13,578		1.4%
1930	14,386		6.0%
1940	14,909		3.6%
1950	15,420		3.4%
1960	16,728		8.5%
1970	18,855		12.7%
1980	24,599		30.5%
1990	27,859		13.3%
2000	34,835		25.0%
2010	41,240		18.4%
2020	42,712		3.6%
2025 (est.)	45,855	▲	7.4%
U.S. Decennial Census; 1790–1960 1900–1990; 1990–2000 2010 2020

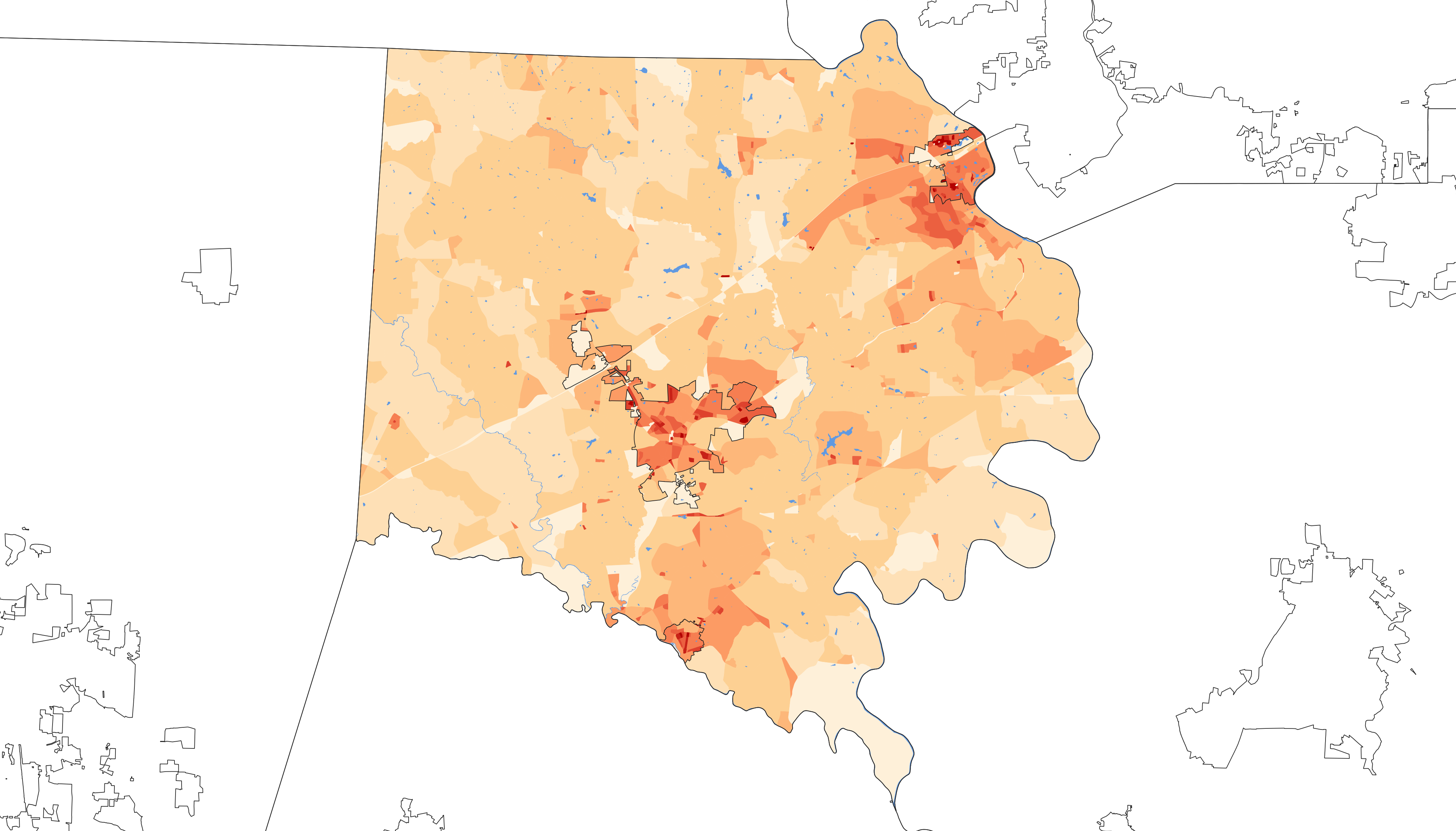
2020 population density of Davie County NC by census block

=== 2020 census ===
Davie County, North Carolina – Racial and ethnic composition Note: the US Census treats Hispanic/Latino as an ethnic category. This table excludes Latinos from the racial categories and assigns them to a separate category. Hispanics/Latinos may be of any race.
Race / Ethnicity (NH = Non-Hispanic)	Pop 1980	Pop 1990	Pop 2000	Pop 2010	Pop 2020	% 1980	% 1990	% 2000	% 2010	% 2020
White alone (NH)	21,870	25,115	30,832	35,257	34,809	88.91%	90.15%	88.51%	85.49%	81.50%
Black or African American alone (NH)	2,540	2,473	2,343	2,552	2,413	10.33%	8.88%	6.73%	6.19%	5.65%
Native American or Alaska Native alone (NH)	48	85	76	106	96	0.20%	0.31%	0.22%	0.26%	0.22%
Asian alone (NH)	14	52	108	228	277	0.06%	0.19%	0.31%	0.55%	0.65%
Native Hawaiian or Pacific Islander alone (NH)	x	x	6	6	5	x	x	0.02%	0.01%	0.01%
Other race alone (NH)	0	5	17	39	124	0.00%	0.02%	0.05%	0.09%	0.29%
Mixed race or Multiracial (NH)	x	x	244	556	1,613	x	x	0.70%	1.35%	3.78%
Hispanic or Latino (any race)	127	129	1,209	2,496	3,375	0.52%	0.46%	3.47%	6.05%	7.90%
Total	24,599	27,859	34,835	41,240	42,712	100.00%	100.00%	100.00%	100.00%	100.00%

As of the 2020 census, the county had a population of 42,712, 17,256 households, and 11,586 families residing there. The median age was 46.0 years, with 20.9% of residents under the age of 18 and 22.0% aged 65 or older. For every 100 females there were 95.5 males, and for every 100 females age 18 and over there were 92.6 males age 18 and over.

The racial makeup of the county was 82.7% White, 5.7% Black or African American, 0.5% American Indian and Alaska Native, 0.7% Asian, <0.1% Native Hawaiian and Pacific Islander, 4.5% from some other race, and 5.9% from two or more races. Hispanic or Latino residents of any race comprised 7.9% of the population.

29.6% of residents lived in urban areas, while 70.4% lived in rural areas.

Of those 17,256 households, 28.7% had children under the age of 18 living in them. Of all households, 55.1% were married-couple households, 15.4% were households with a male householder and no spouse or partner present, and 24.4% were households with a female householder and no spouse or partner present. About 25.3% of all households were made up of individuals and 13.0% had someone living alone who was 65 years of age or older.

There were 18,753 housing units, of which 8.0% were vacant. Among occupied housing units, 79.1% were owner-occupied and 20.9% were renter-occupied. The homeowner vacancy rate was 1.8% and the rental vacancy rate was 7.0%.

=== 2000 census ===
At the 2000 census, there were 34,835 people, 13,750 households, and 10,257 families residing in the county. The population density was 131 people per square mile (51 people/km^{2}). There were 14,953 housing units at an average density of 56 units per square mile (22 units/km^{2}). The racial makeup of the county was 90.44% White, 6.80% Black or African American, 0.23% Native American, 0.31% Asian, 0.02% Pacific Islander, 1.31% from other races, and 0.89% from two or more races. 3.47% of the population were Hispanic or Latino of any race.

There were 13,750 households, out of which 32.70% had children under the age of 18 living with them, 61.40% were married couples living together, 9.20% had a female householder with no husband present, and 25.40% were non-families. 22.20% of all households were made up of individuals, and 9.70% had someone living alone who was 65 years of age or older. The average household size was 2.51 and the average family size was 2.91.

In the county, the population was well distributed by age, with 24.30% under the age of 18, 7.10% from 18 to 24, 29.40% from 25 to 44, 25.50% from 45 to 64, and 13.80% who were 65 years of age or older. The median age was 38 years. For every 100 females there were 97.00 males. For every 100 females aged 18 and over, there were 94.00 males.

The median income for a household in the county was $40,174, and the median income for a family was $47,699. Males had a median income of $33,179 versus $24,632 for females. The per capita income for the county was $21,359. About 6.40% of families and 8.60% of the population were below the poverty line, including 10.20% of those under age 18 and 11.30% of those age 65 or over.

== Government and politics ==
United States presidential election results for Davie County, North Carolina
Year	Republican		Democratic		Third party(ies)	
Year	No.	%	No.	%	No.	%
1912	810	40.93%	823	41.59%	346	17.48%
1916	1,245	57.61%	910	42.11%	6	0.28%
1920	2,591	61.47%	1,624	38.53%	0	0.00%
1924	2,672	59.64%	1,795	40.07%	13	0.29%
1928	2,959	73.17%	1,085	26.83%	0	0.00%
1932	2,473	50.52%	2,381	48.64%	41	0.84%
1936	2,502	50.26%	2,476	49.74%	0	0.00%
1940	2,532	46.65%	2,896	53.35%	0	0.00%
1944	3,244	58.87%	2,266	41.13%	0	0.00%
1948	2,679	54.02%	1,917	38.66%	363	7.32%
1952	4,010	62.50%	2,406	37.50%	0	0.00%
1956	4,599	68.55%	2,110	31.45%	0	0.00%
1960	4,788	65.96%	2,471	34.04%	0	0.00%
1964	4,460	59.10%	3,086	40.90%	0	0.00%
1968	3,866	49.04%	1,502	19.05%	2,515	31.90%
1972	5,613	75.69%	1,578	21.28%	225	3.03%
1976	4,772	56.39%	3,635	42.96%	55	0.65%
1980	6,302	63.79%	3,289	33.29%	289	2.93%
1984	8,201	73.72%	2,911	26.17%	13	0.12%
1988	7,988	71.37%	3,166	28.29%	38	0.34%
1992	6,796	54.86%	3,675	29.67%	1,916	15.47%
1996	8,141	64.51%	3,525	27.93%	954	7.56%
2000	10,184	72.75%	3,651	26.08%	163	1.16%
2004	12,372	74.17%	4,233	25.38%	75	0.45%
2008	13,981	68.64%	6,178	30.33%	209	1.03%
2012	14,687	71.05%	5,735	27.75%	248	1.20%
2016	15,602	71.71%	5,270	24.22%	884	4.06%
2020	18,228	72.02%	6,713	26.52%	370	1.46%
2024	19,398	72.25%	6,988	26.03%	464	1.73%

Davie is an overwhelmingly Republican county, being one of seven North Carolina counties to be won by Alf Landon in 1936, and one of thirteen to be carried by Barry Goldwater in 1964. The only Democrat to win the county since World War I has been Franklin D. Roosevelt in 1940, when he was aided by support for Britain's World War II effort by the county's population – which was predominantly of British ancestry.

Davie County is a member of the Northwest Piedmont Council of Governments. In the North Carolina Senate, it is in the 31st Senate district, represented by Republican Joyce Krawiec. In the North Carolina House of Representatives, Davie County is in the 79th district represented by Republican Julia C. Howard.

== Yadkin Valley wine region ==
Portions of Davie County are located in the Yadkin Valley AVA, an American Viticultural Area. Wines made from grapes grown in the Yadkin Valley AVA may use the appellation Yadkin Valley on their labels.

== Education ==
Davie County Schools has twelve schools, including Davie County High School.

== Communities ==
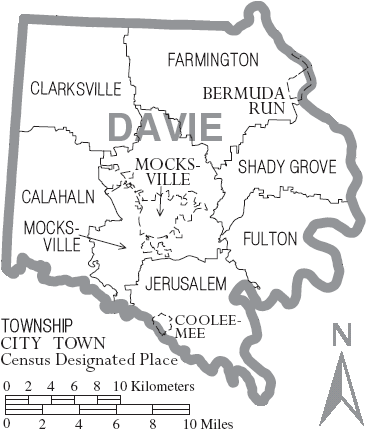
Map of Davie County with municipal and township labels

=== Towns ===
- Bermuda Run
- Cooleemee
- Mocksville (county seat and largest community)

=== Townships ===
The following townships were used in the 1860 U.S. Census for Davie County:

- Chinquapin
- Farmington
- Fulton
- Hunting Creek
- Liberty
- Mocksville
- Shady Grove
- Smith Grove

By the requirements of the North Carolina Constitution of 1868, all counties in North Carolina were divided into townships. The townships have been used in U.S. Census enumerations since 1870. The following townships were created in 1868:

- Calahaln Township
- Clarksville Township
- Farmington Township
- Fulton Township
- Jerusalem Township
- Mocksville Township
- Shady Grove Township

=== Unincorporated communities ===
- Cornatzer
- Hillsdale
- Maine
- Sheffield
- Turkeyfoot

=== Census-designated places ===
- Advance
- Farmington

=== Post offices ===
Through 1971, there were only three continuing U.S. post offices in Davie County:

- Advance (since February 16, 1877)
- Cooleemee (since February 9, 1900)
- Mocksville (since January 4, 1830; created in Rowan County until Davie County was formed)

== See also ==
- List of counties in North Carolina
- National Register of Historic Places listings in Davie County, North Carolina
