= Acreage allotment =

A farm's acreage allotment, under provisions of permanent commodity price support law, is its share, based on its previous production, of the national acreage needed to produce sufficient supplies of a particular crop. Under the 2002 farm bill (P.L. 101–171, Title I), acreage allotments are not applicable to the covered commodities, peanuts, or sugar. Subsequently, allotments and quotas and price support for tobacco were eliminated beginning in 2005 (P.L. 108–357, Title VI).
