= GMI =

GMI may refer to:

== Educational and research institutions ==
- General Motors Institute of Technology, in Flint, Michigan, United States
- Genomic Medicine Institute, at the Cleveland Clinic, Ohio, United States
- Georgia Medical Institute, in Georgia, United States
- Georgia Military Institute, in Marietta, Georgia, United States
- German-Malaysian Institute, in Malaysia
- Gorgas Memorial Institute for Health Studies, a medical research institution in Panama
- Greenwich Maritime Institute, of the University of Greenwich, England
- Gregor Mendel Institute, a biological research institute in Austria

== Enterprises and organizations ==
- General Mills Inc
- George C. Marshall Institute, an American think tank
- Global Methane Initiative, an environmental organization
- GMInsideNews, an internet forum focused on General Motors
- Grace Ministries International, a Christian organization
- Greater Ministries International, an American Christian ministry that ran a Ponzi scheme
- Groupement Mixte d'Intervention, a French Cold-War-era counter-intelligence service

== Transport ==
- Gasmata Airport, in Papua New Guinea
- Germania (airline), a German airline
- Gond Umri railway station, in Maharashtra, India

== Other uses ==
- GamesMaster International, a British magazine
- Giant magnetoimpedance
- Global microbial identifier
- Global Militarization Index
- GPM Microwave Imager (see Global Precipitation Measurement)
- Graded motor imagery, a therapy for Complex regional pain syndrome (CRPS)
- Guaranteed minimum income
- .gmi, a file extension used by Gemini (protocol)
