= David Kim =

David Kim may refer to:

- David Kim (violinist) (born 1963), American violinist
- David Kim (restaurateur), American businessman and CEO of Mexican fast food chain Baja Fresh
- David J. Kim (born 1979), CEO and founder of C2 Education Centers
- David S. Kim (born 1965), former California Secretary of Transportation
- David Kwangshin Kim (1935–2022), Korean Protestant Christian pastor
- David Kim (politician), former MacArthur Park neighborhood council board member and runner-up for California's 34th congressional district election district in 2020, 2022 and 2024
- David Kim, also known as Xombi, a character from DC Comics
