= 2018 United States House of Representatives elections in Georgia =

- November 6, 2018

All 14 Georgia seats to the United States House of Representatives
- Turnout: 59.14% ▼10.14 pp
	Majority party	Minority party
Party	Republican	Democratic
Last election	10	4
Seats before	10	4
Seats won	9	5
Seat change	▼1	▲1
Popular vote	1,987,191	1,814,469
Percentage	52.28%	47.72%
Swing	▼8%	▲8%

Republican hold
Democratic hold Democratic gain
Republican
50–60%
60–70%
70–80%
80–90%
>90%
Democratic
50–60%
60–70%
70–80%
80–90%
>90%

The 2018 United States House of Representatives elections in Georgia were held on November 6, 2018, to elect the fourteen U.S. representatives from the state of Georgia, one from each of the state's fourteen congressional districts. The elections coincided with a gubernatorial election, as well as other elections to the House of Representatives, elections to the United States Senate, and various state and local elections. The primary elections took place on May 22, 2018.

One seat flipped to the Democrats, changing the state congressional delegation from a 10–4 Republican majority to a 9–5 Republican majority.

== Results summary ==
=== Statewide ===
Party	Candi- dates	Votes		Seats		
Party	Candi- dates	No.	%	No.	+/–	%
Republican	13	1,987,191	52.27%	9	▼1	64.29%
Democratic	13	1,814,469	47.73%	5	▲1	35.71%
Total	26	3,801,660	100.00%	14	Steady	100.00%

Popular vote
Republican	52.27%
Democratic	47.73%

House seats
Republican	64.29%
Democratic	35.71%

=== District ===
Results of the 2018 United States House of Representatives elections in Georgia by district:

District	Republican		Democratic		Others		Total		Result
District	Votes	%	Votes	%	Votes	%	Votes	%	Result
District 1	144,741	57.74%	105,942	42.26%	0	0.00%	250,683	100.00%	Republican hold
District 2	92,472	40.35%	136,699	59.65%	0	0.00%	229,171	100.00%	Democratic hold
District 3	191,996	65.53%	101,010	34.47%	0	0.00%	293,006	100.00%	Republican hold
District 4	61,092	21.15%	227,717	78.85%	0	0.00%	288,809	100.00%	Democratic hold
District 5	0	0.00%	275,406	100.00%	0	0.00%	275,406	100.00%	Democratic hold
District 6	156,875	49.49%	160,139	50.51%	0	0.00%	317,014	100.00%	Democratic gain
District 7	140,430	50.07%	140,011	49.93%	0	0.00%	280,441	100.00%	Republican hold
District 8	198,152	100.00%	0	0.00%	0	0.00%	198,152	100.00%	Republican hold
District 9	224,661	79.51%	57,912	20.49%	0	0.00%	282,573	100.00%	Republican hold
District 10	190,396	62.89%	112,339	37.11%	0	0.00%	302,735	100.00%	Republican hold
District 11	191,887	61.79%	118,653	38.21%	0	0.00%	310,540	100.00%	Republican hold
District 12	148,986	59.48%	101,503	40.52%	0	0.00%	250,489	100.00%	Republican hold
District 13	69,760	23.82%	223,157	76.18%	0	0.00%	292,917	100.00%	Democratic hold
District 14	175,743	76.50%	53,981	23.50%	0	0.00%	229,724	100.00%	Republican hold
Total	1,987,191	52.27%	1,814,469	47.73%	0	0.00%	3,801,660	100.00%	

== District 1 ==
2018 Georgia's 1st congressional district election
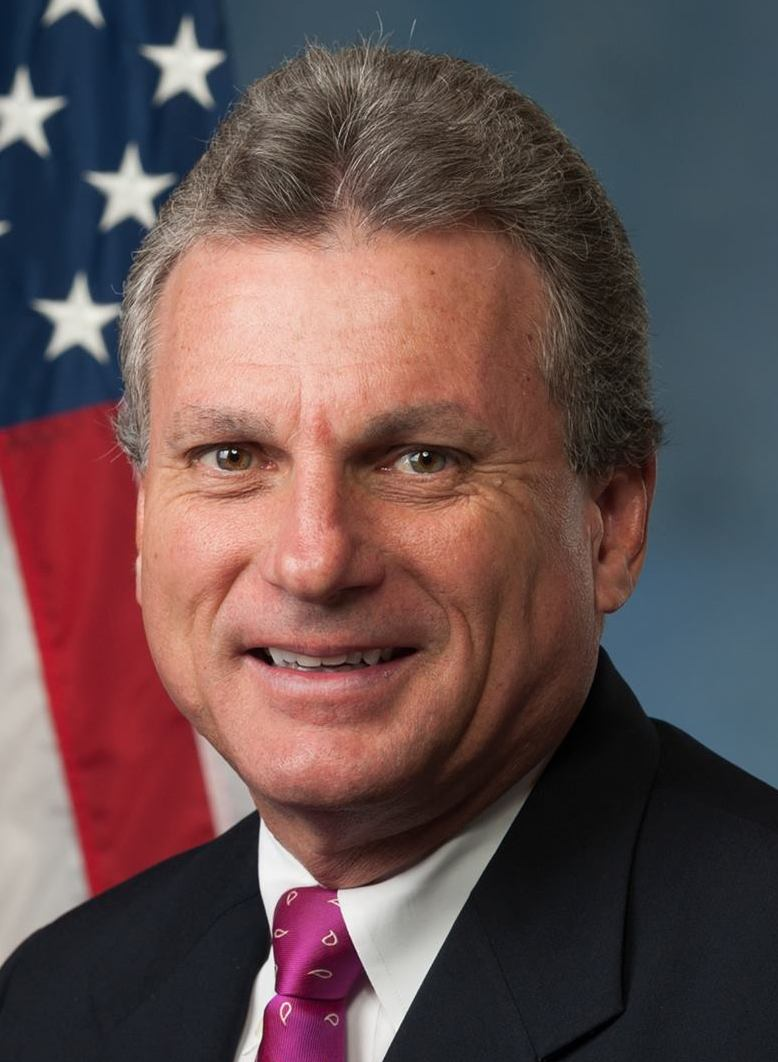

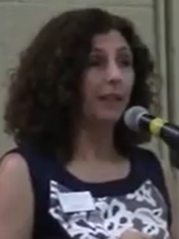
Nominee	Buddy Carter	Lisa Ring
Party	Republican	Democratic
Popular vote	144,741	105,942
Percentage	57.7%	42.3%
- County results Carter: 60–70% 70–80% 80–90% >90% Ring: 50–60% 60–70%
U.S. Representative before election
Buddy Carter
Republican
Elected U.S. Representative
Buddy Carter
Republican

The incumbent was Republican Buddy Carter, who had represented the district since 2015. He was re-elected unopposed in 2016. He ran for re-election.

=== Republican primary ===
==== Candidates ====
===== Nominee =====
- Earl L. "Buddy" Carter, incumbent U.S. representative

==== Primary results ====
Republican primary results
Party	Candidate	Votes	%
Republican	Earl L. "Buddy" Carter (incumbent)	35,552	100.0
Total votes		35,552	100.0

=== Democratic primary ===
==== Candidates ====
===== Nominee =====
- Lisa Ring, community organizer

===== Eliminated in primary =====
- Barbara Seidman, retired businesswoman

==== Primary results ====
Democratic primary results
Party	Candidate	Votes	%
Democratic	Lisa Ring	20,543	67.54
Democratic	Barbara Seidman	9,871	32.46
Total votes		30,414	100.0

=== General election ===
==== Predictions ====
Source	Ranking	As of
The Cook Political Report	Safe R	November 5, 2018
Inside Elections	Safe R	November 5, 2018
Sabato's Crystal Ball	Safe R	November 5, 2018
RCP	Safe R	November 5, 2018
Daily Kos	Safe R	November 5, 2018
538	Safe R	November 7, 2018
CNN	Safe R	October 31, 2018
Politico	Safe R	November 4, 2018

==== Endorsements ====
Lisa Ring (D)

Labor unions

- AFL-CIO
- International Brotherhood of Boilermakers

Organizations

- Indivisible
- Our Revolution
- Progressive Democrats of America

==== Results ====
Georgia's 1st congressional district, 2018
Party	Candidate	Votes	%
Republican	Buddy Carter (incumbent)	144,741	57.7
Democratic	Lisa Ring	105,942	42.3
Majority		38,799	15.4
Total votes		250,683	100.0
Republican hold			

== District 2 ==
2018 Georgia's 2nd congressional district election
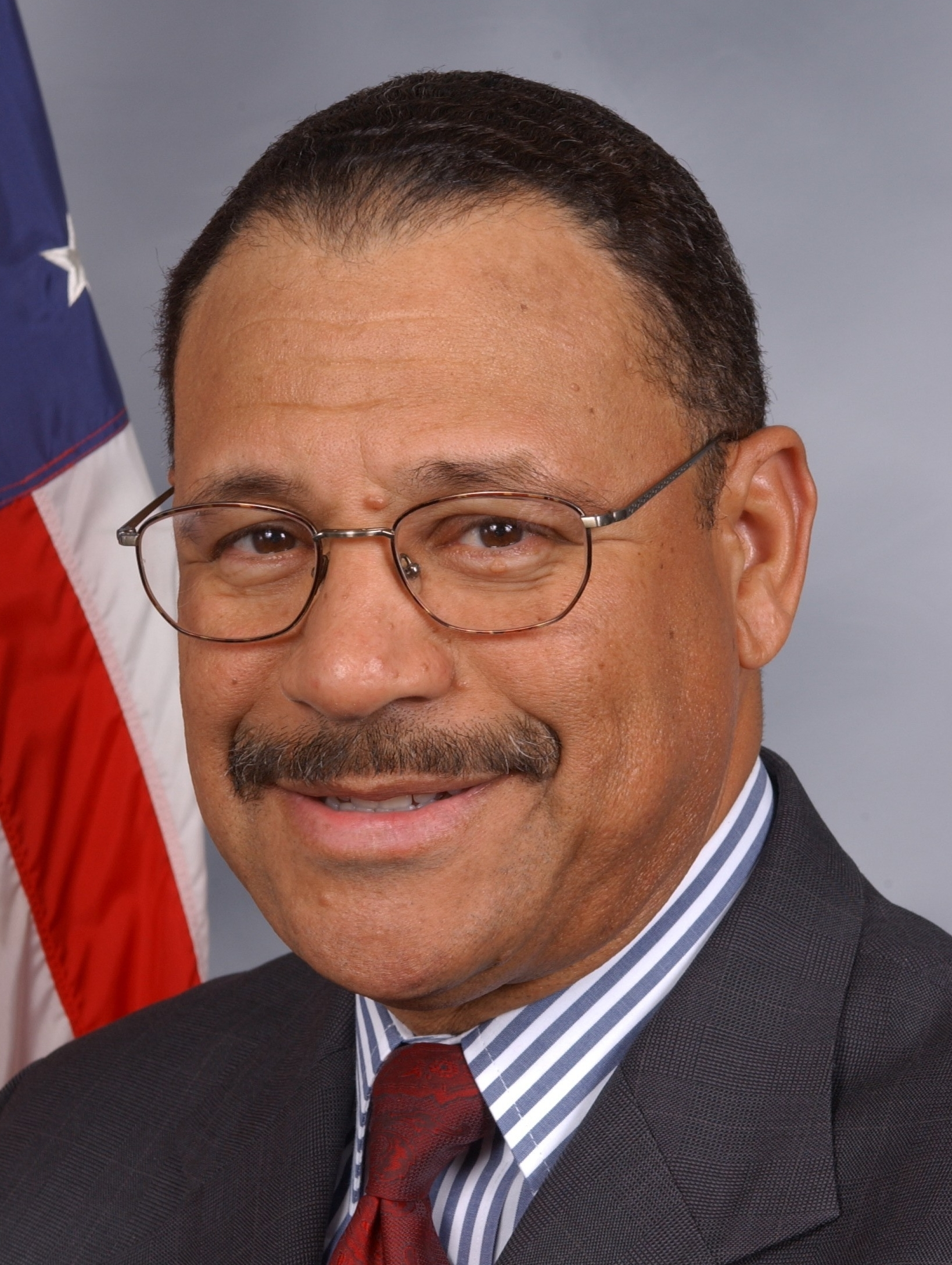

Nominee	Sanford Bishop	Herman West Jr.
Party	Democratic	Republican
Popular vote	135,709	92,132
Percentage	59.6%	40.4%
- County results Bishop: 50–60% 60–70% 70–80% West: 50–60% 60–70% 70–80%
U.S. Representative before election
Sanford Bishop
Democratic
Elected U.S. Representative
Sanford Bishop
Democratic

The incumbent was Democrat Sanford Bishop, who had represented the district since 1993. He was re-elected with 61% of the vote in 2016.

=== Democratic primary ===
==== Candidates ====
===== Nominee =====
- Sanford Bishop, incumbent U.S. representative

==== Primary results ====
Democratic primary results
Party	Candidate	Votes	%
Democratic	Sanford Bishop (incumbent)	42,855	100.0
Total votes		42,855	100.0

=== Republican primary ===
==== Candidates ====
===== Nominee =====
- Herman West, pastor

==== Primary results ====
Republican primary results
Party	Candidate	Votes	%
Republican	Herman West	23,147	100.0
Total votes		23,147	100.0

=== General election ===
==== Predictions ====
Source	Ranking	As of
The Cook Political Report	Safe D	November 5, 2018
Inside Elections	Safe D	November 5, 2018
Sabato's Crystal Ball	Safe D	November 5, 2018
RCP	Safe D	November 5, 2018
Daily Kos	Safe D	November 5, 2018
538	Safe D	November 7, 2018
CNN	Safe D	October 31, 2018
Politico	Safe D	November 4, 2018

==== Endorsements ====
Sanford Bishop (D)

Labor unions

- AFL-CIO
- Communications Workers of America
- International Brotherhood of Boilermakers

Organizations

- BIPAC

==== Results ====
Georgia's 2nd congressional district, 2018
Party	Candidate	Votes	%
Democratic	Sanford Bishop (incumbent)	136,699	59.7
Republican	Herman West	92,472	40.3
Total votes		229,171	100.0
Democratic hold			

== District 3 ==
2018 Georgia's 3rd congressional district election
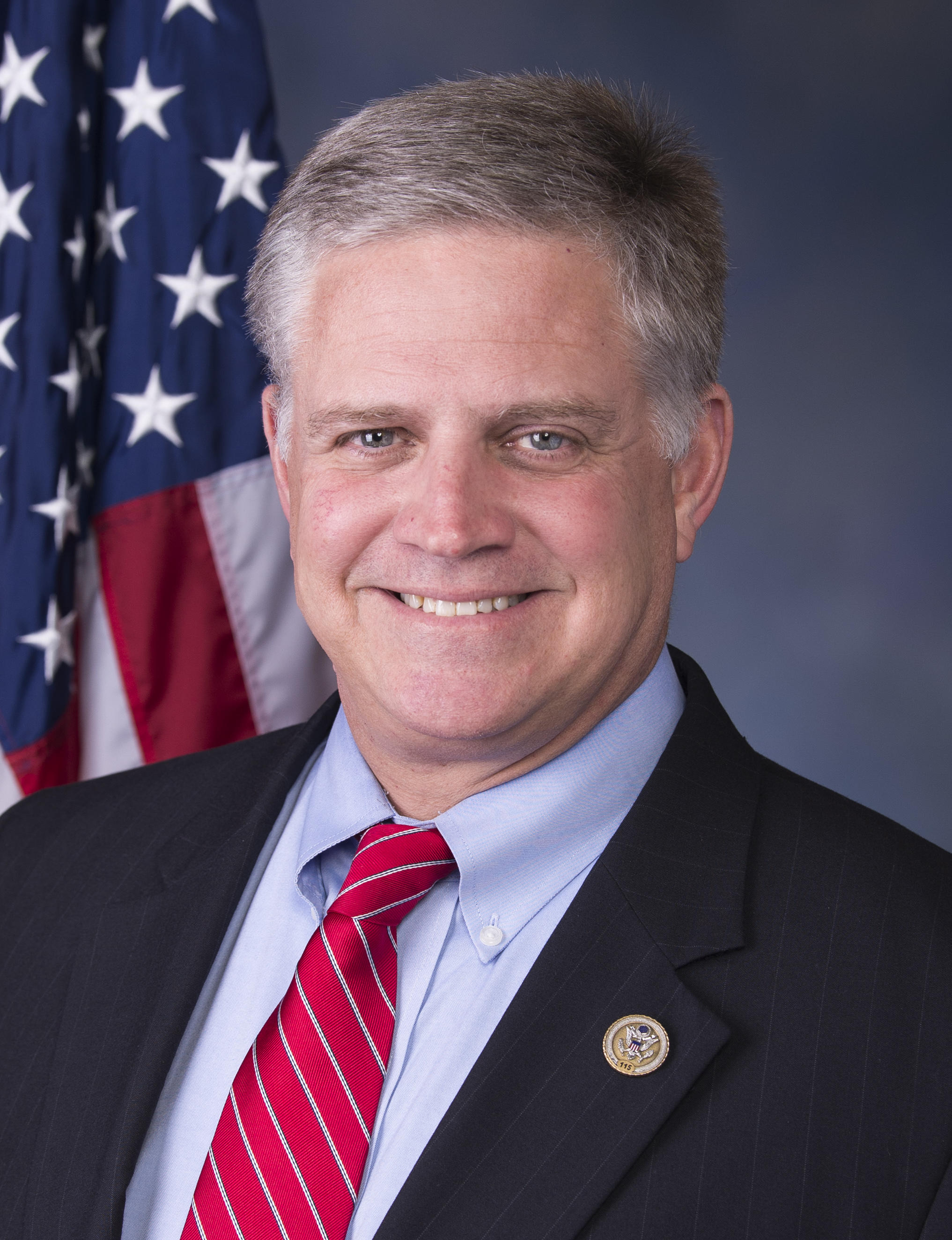

Nominee	Drew Ferguson	Chuck Enderlin
Party	Republican	Democratic
Popular vote	191,996	101,010
Percentage	65.5%	34.5%
- County results Ferguson: 50–60% 60–70% 70–80% 80–90% Enderlin: 50–60%
U.S. Representative before election
Drew Ferguson
Republican
Elected U.S. Representative
Drew Ferguson
Republican

The incumbent was Republican Drew Ferguson, who had represented the district since 2017. He was elected with 68% of the vote in 2016.

=== Republican primary ===
==== Candidates ====
===== Nominee =====
- Drew Ferguson, incumbent U.S. representative

===== Eliminated in primary =====
- Philip Singleton, pilot

==== Primary results ====
Republican primary results
Party	Candidate	Votes	%
Republican	Drew Ferguson (incumbent)	43,381	74.37
Republican	Philip Singleton	14,948	25.63
Total votes		58,329	100.0

=== Democratic primary ===
==== Candidates ====
===== Nominee =====
- Chuck Enderlin, pilot

===== Eliminated in primary =====
- Rusty Oliver, science teacher

==== Primary results ====
Democratic primary results
Party	Candidate	Votes	%
Democratic	Chuck Enderlin	13,614	59.87
Democratic	Rusty Oliver	9,126	40.13
Total votes		22,740	100.0

=== General election ===
==== Predictions ====
Source	Ranking	As of
The Cook Political Report	Safe R	November 5, 2018
Inside Elections	Safe R	November 5, 2018
Sabato's Crystal Ball	Safe R	November 5, 2018
RCP	Safe R	November 5, 2018
Daily Kos	Safe R	November 5, 2018
538	Safe R	November 7, 2018
CNN	Safe R	October 31, 2018
Politico	Safe R	November 4, 2018

==== Endorsements ====
Chuck Enderlin (D)

Labor unions

- AFL-CIO
- International Brotherhood of Boilermakers

==== Polling ====
Poll source	Date(s) administered	Sample size	Margin of error	Drew Ferguson (R)	Chuck Enderlin (D)	Undecided
Public Policy Polling	October 15–16, 2018	681	±?%	56%	26%	18%

==== Results ====
Georgia's 3rd congressional district, 2018
Party	Candidate	Votes	%
Republican	Drew Ferguson (incumbent)	191,996	65.5
Democratic	Chuck Enderlin	101,010	34.5
Total votes		293,006	100.0
Republican hold			

== District 4 ==
2018 Georgia's 4th congressional district election
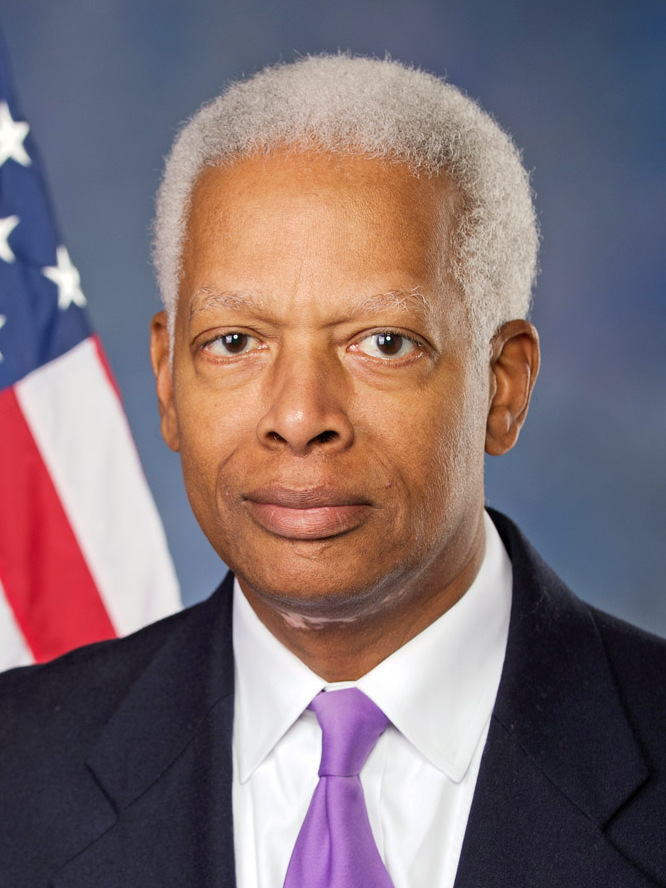

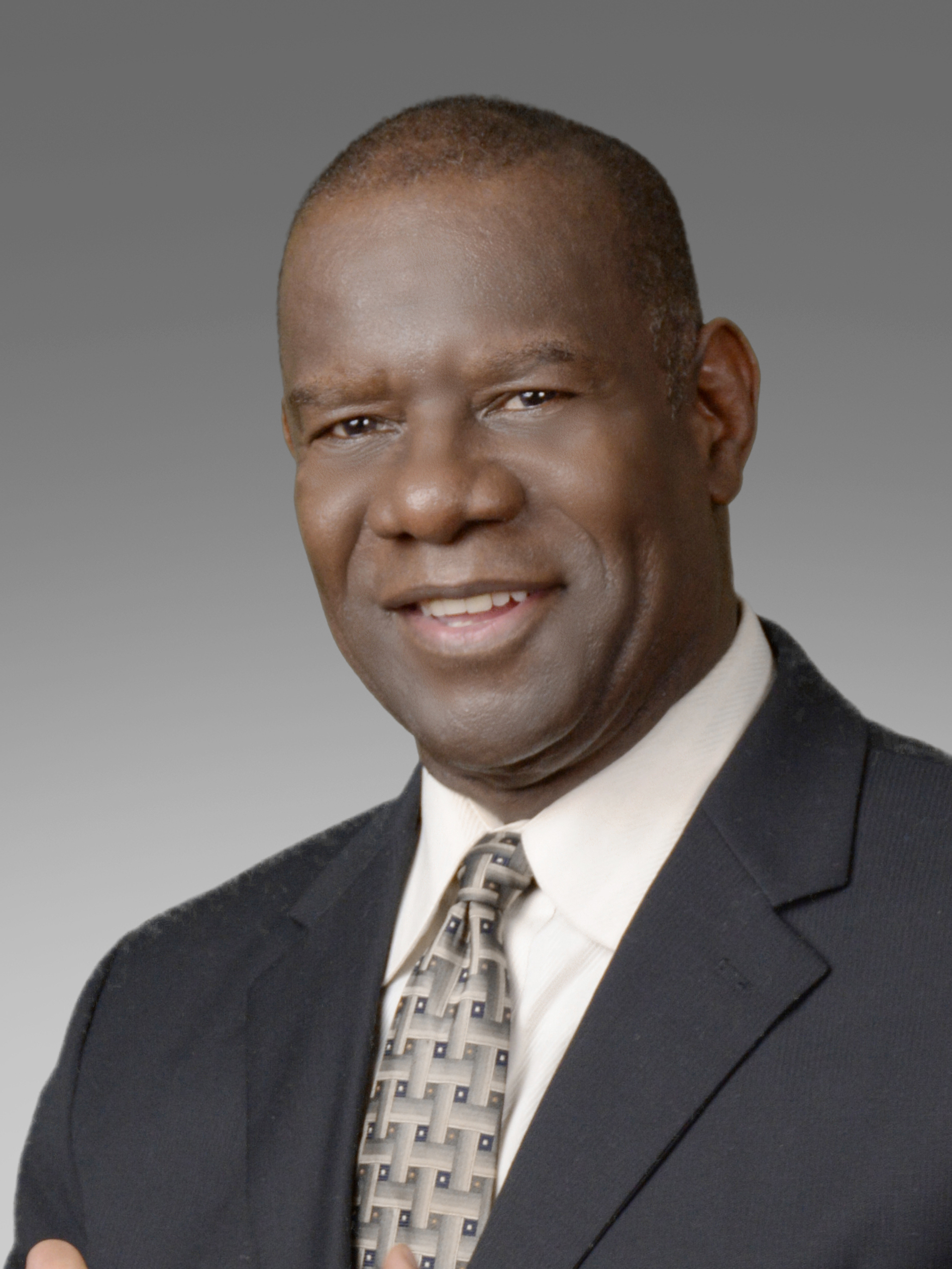
Nominee	Hank Johnson	Joe Profit
Party	Democratic	Republican
Popular vote	227,717	61,092
Percentage	78.9%	21.1%
- County results Johnson: 60–70% 80–90%
U.S. Representative before election
Hank Johnson
Democratic
Elected U.S. Representative
Hank Johnson
Democratic

The incumbent was Democratic Hank Johnson, who had represented the district since 2007. He was re-elected with 76% of the vote in 2016.

=== Democratic primary ===
==== Candidates ====
===== Nominee =====
- Hank Johnson, incumbent U.S. representative

===== Eliminated in primary =====
- Juan Parks, Marine Corps JROTC instructor

==== Primary results ====
Democratic primary results
Party	Candidate	Votes	%
Democratic	Hank Johnson (incumbent)	55,060	79.77
Democratic	Juan Parks	13,966	20.23
Total votes		69,026	100.0

=== Republican primary ===
==== Candidates ====
===== Nominee =====
- Joe Profit, businessman and former NFL player

==== Primary results ====
Republican primary results
Party	Candidate	Votes	%
Republican	Joe Profit	15,367	100.0
Total votes		15,367	100.0

=== General election ===
==== Predictions ====
Source	Ranking	As of
The Cook Political Report	Safe D	November 5, 2018
Inside Elections	Safe D	November 5, 2018
Sabato's Crystal Ball	Safe D	November 5, 2018
RCP	Safe D	November 5, 2018
Daily Kos	Safe D	November 5, 2018
538	Safe D	November 7, 2018
CNN	Safe D	October 31, 2018
Politico	Safe D	November 4, 2018

==== Endorsements ====
Hank Johnson (D)

Labor unions

- AFL-CIO
- Communications Workers of America
- International Brotherhood of Boilermakers

==== Results ====
Georgia's 4th congressional district, 2018
Party	Candidate	Votes	%
Democratic	Hank Johnson (incumbent)	227,717	78.9
Republican	Joe Profit	61,092	21.1
Total votes		288,809	100.0
Democratic hold			

== District 5 ==
2018 Georgia's 5th congressional district election
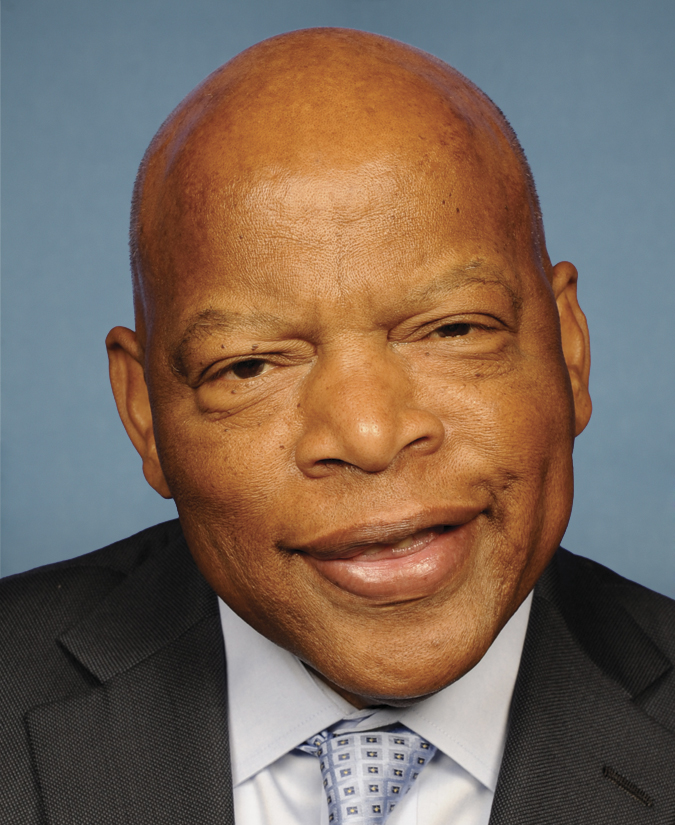
Nominee	John Lewis
Party	Democratic
Popular vote	275,406
Percentage	100%
- County results Lewis: >90%
U.S. Representative before election
John Lewis
Democratic
Elected U.S. Representative
John Lewis
Democratic

The incumbent was Democratic John Lewis, who had represented the district from 1987 until his death in 2020. Lewis was re-elected with 84% of the vote in 2016. With no primary challenger and no Republican opposition, Rep. Lewis won his 2018 midterm election for the 116th Congress of the United States by default.

=== Democratic primary ===
==== Candidates ====
===== Nominee =====
- John Lewis, incumbent U.S. representative

==== Primary results ====
Democratic primary results
Party	Candidate	Votes	%
Democratic	John Lewis (incumbent)	80,860	100.0
Total votes		80,860	100.0

=== General election ===
==== Predictions ====
Source	Ranking	As of
The Cook Political Report	Safe D	November 5, 2018
Inside Elections	Safe D	November 5, 2018
Sabato's Crystal Ball	Safe D	November 5, 2018
RCP	Safe D	November 5, 2018
Daily Kos	Safe D	November 5, 2018
538	Safe D	November 7, 2018
CNN	Safe D	October 31, 2018
Politico	Safe D	November 4, 2018

==== Endorsements ====
John Lewis (D)

Labor unions

- AFL-CIO
- International Brotherhood of Boilermakers

==== Results ====
Georgia's 5th congressional district, 2018
Party	Candidate	Votes	%
Democratic	John Lewis (incumbent)	275,406	100.0
Total votes		275,406	100.0
Democratic hold			

== District 6 ==
2018 Georgia's 6th congressional district election
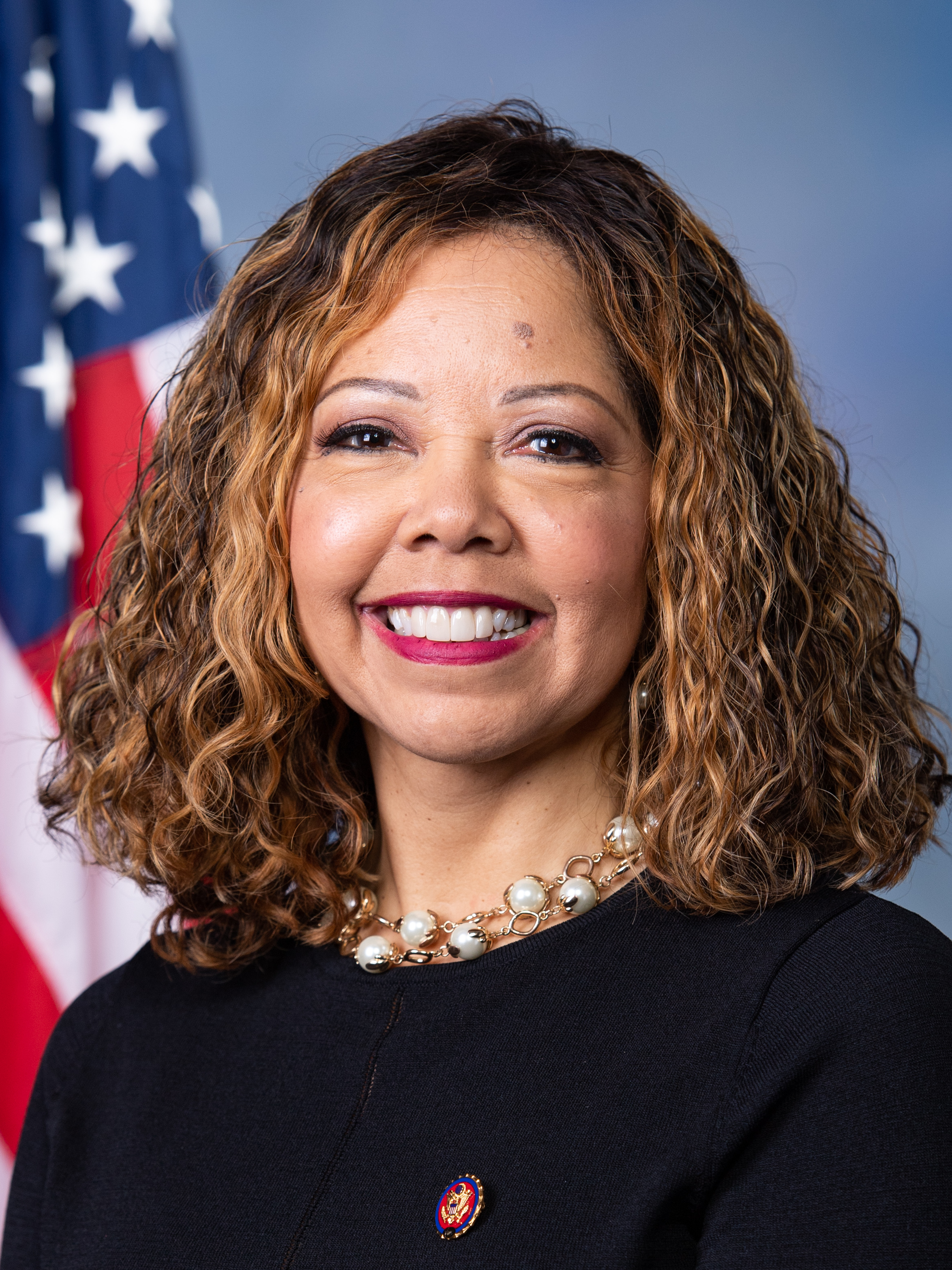

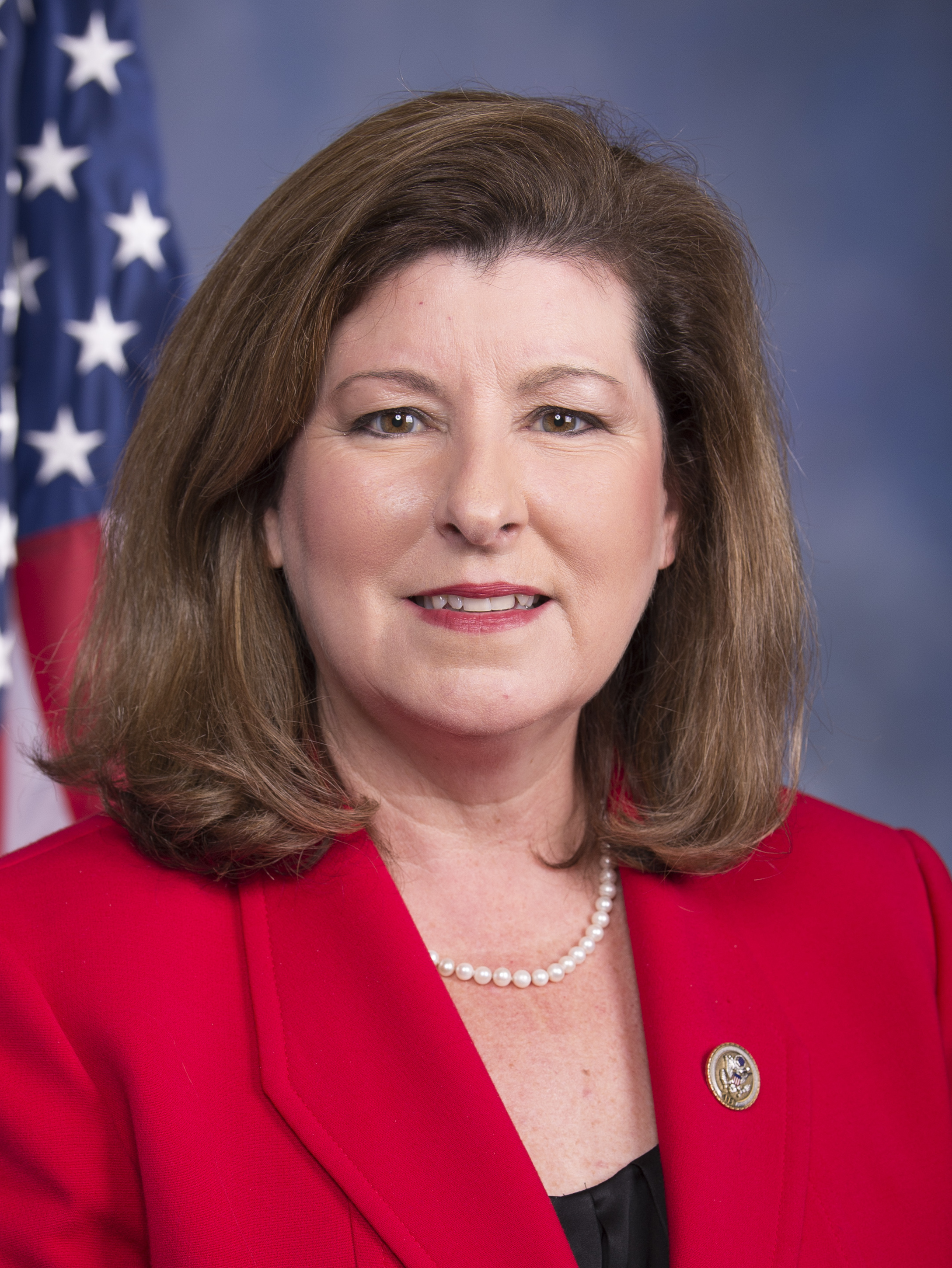
Nominee	Lucy McBath	Karen Handel
Party	Democratic	Republican
Popular vote	160,139	156,875
Percentage	50.5%	49.5%
- County results McBath: 50–60% Handel: 50–60%
U.S. Representative before election
Karen Handel
Republican
Elected U.S. Representative
Lucy McBath
Democratic

The incumbent was Republican Karen Handel, who won a hotly contested special election for the seat in 2017 with 51.8% of the vote.

This was one of 80 Republican-held House districts targeted by the Democratic Congressional Campaign Committee in 2018.

=== Republican primary ===
==== Candidates ====
===== Nominee =====
- Karen Handel, incumbent U.S. representative

==== Primary results ====
Republican primary results
Party	Candidate	Votes	%
Republican	Karen Handel (incumbent)	40,410	100.0
Total votes		40,410	100.0

=== Democratic primary ===
==== Candidates ====
===== Nominee =====
- Lucy McBath, Everytown for Gun Safety and Moms Demand Action national spokesperson

===== Eliminated in runoff =====
- Kevin Abel, businessman

===== Eliminated in primary =====
- Steven Knight Griffin, management consultant
- Bobby Kaple, TV news anchor

===== Declined =====
- Jon Ossoff, investigative journalist, media executive and nominee for Georgia's 6th congressional district in 2017

==== Primary results ====
Results by county: McBath: 30–40%

Democratic primary results
Party	Candidate	Votes	%
Democratic	Lucy McBath	15,138	36.27
Democratic	Kevin Abel	12,747	30.54
Democratic	Bobby Kaple	10,956	26.25
Democratic	Steven Griffin	2,901	6.95
Total votes		41,742	100.0

==== Runoff ====
===== Debate =====
2018 Georgia's 6th congressional district Democratic primary runoff debate
No.	Date	Host	Moderator	Link	Democratic	Democratic
Key: P Participant A Absent N Not invited I Invited W Withdrawn						
Key: P Participant A Absent N Not invited I Invited W Withdrawn					Kevin Abel	Lucy McBath
1	Jul. 16, 2018	Georgia Public Broadcasting	Cynne Simpson		P	P

===== Runoff results =====
Results by county: McBath: 50–60%; Abel: 50–60%

Democratic primary runoff results
Party	Candidate	Votes	%
Democratic	Lucy McBath	14,504	53.85
Democratic	Kevin Abel	12,431	46.15
Total votes		26,935	100.0

=== General election ===
==== Endorsements ====
Karen Handel (R)

Federal officials

- Condoleezza Rice, former United States Secretary of State
- Donald Trump, 45th & 47th president of the United States

Organizations

- Maggie's List
- NRA Political Victory Fund
Lucy McBath (D)

Federal officials

- Barack Obama, 44th president of the United States

U.S. representatives

- John Lewis, civil rights activist and U.S. representative from Georgia's 5th congressional district

Labor unions

- AFL-CIO
- International Brotherhood of Boilermakers

Organizations

- Congressional Black Caucus
- Democratic Congressional Campaign Committee "Red to Blue" Program
- EMILY's List
- End Citizens United
- Everytown for Gun Safety
- Giffords
- MoveOn
- NARAL Pro-Choice America

Individuals

- Tara Strong, voice actress and activist

==== Polling ====
Poll source	Date(s) administered	Sample size	Margin of error	Karen Handel (R)	Lucy McBath (D)	Undecided
Change Research (D)	November 2–4, 2018	395	–	45%	51%	4%
NYT Upshot/Siena College	October 28 – November 4, 2018	421	± 5.0%	44%	46%	9%
Thirty-Ninth Street Strategies (D-McBath)	October 20–22, 2018	400	± 4.9%	48%	47%	5%
JMC Analytics/Bold Blue Campaigns	October 13–18, 2018	500	± 4.5%	49%	45%	6%
Thirty-Ninth Street Strategies (D-McBath)	August 22–26, 2018	600	± 4.3%	49%	47%	4%

==== Debates ====
2018 Georgia's 6th congressional district debate
No.	Date	Host	Moderator	Link	Republican	Democratic
Key: P Participant A Absent N Not invited I Invited W Withdrawn						
Key: P Participant A Absent N Not invited I Invited W Withdrawn					Karen Handel	Lucy McBath
1	Oct. 23, 2018	Georgia Public Broadcasting			P	P

==== Predictions ====
Source	Ranking	As of
The Cook Political Report	Tossup	November 5, 2018
Inside Elections	Lean R	November 5, 2018
Sabato's Crystal Ball	Lean R	November 5, 2018
RCP	Tossup	November 5, 2018
Daily Kos	Lean R	November 5, 2018
538	Tossup	November 7, 2018
CNN	Lean R	October 31, 2018
Politico	Lean R	November 4, 2018

==== Results ====
Georgia's 6th congressional district, 2018
Party	Candidate	Votes	%
Democratic	Lucy McBath	160,139	50.51
Republican	Karen Handel (incumbent)	156,875	49.49
Independent	Jeremy "Carlton Heston" Stubbs	18	
Majority		3,264	1.0
Total votes		317,014	100.0
Democratic gain from Republican			

== District 7 ==
2018 Georgia's 7th congressional district election
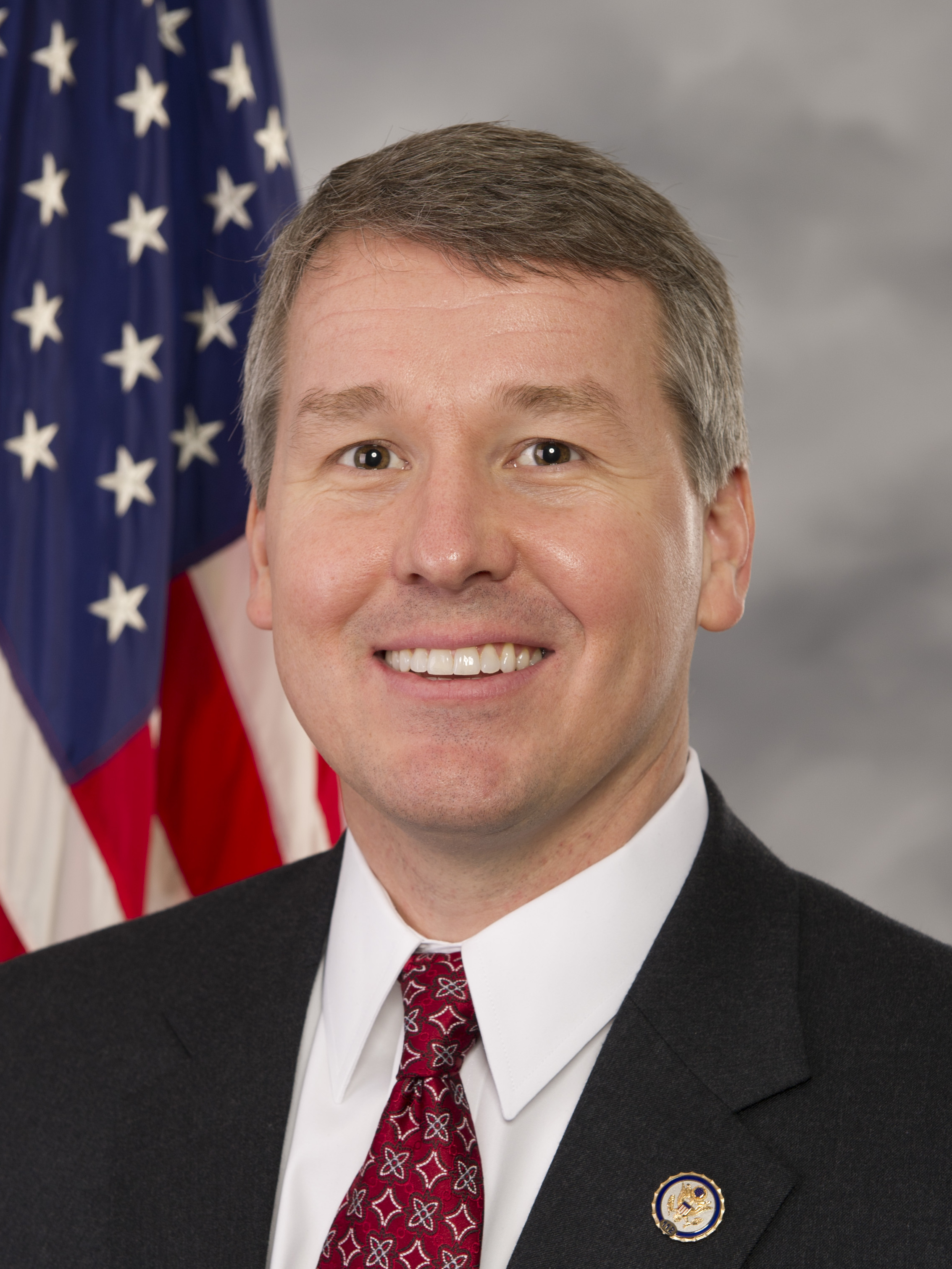

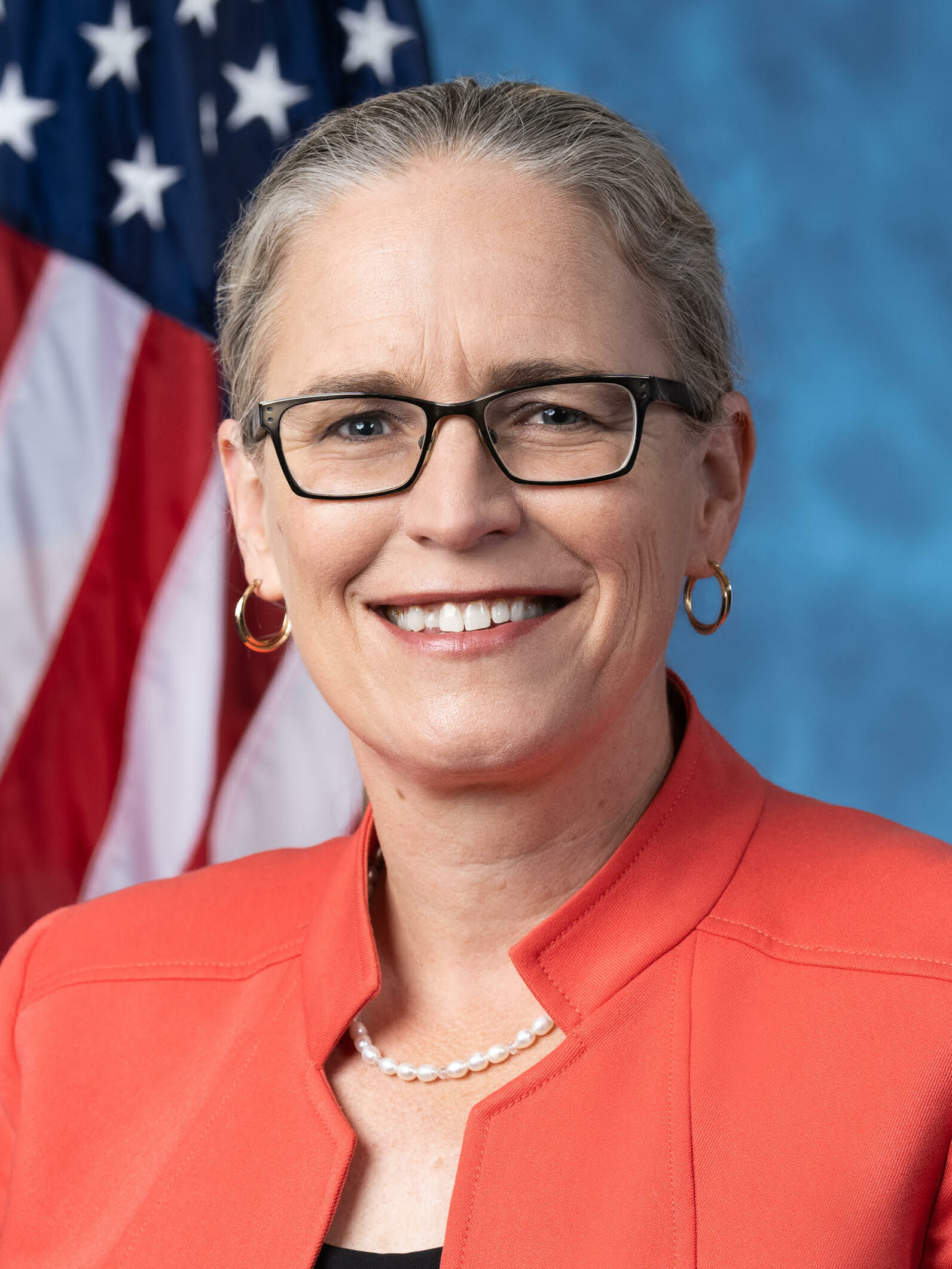
Nominee	Rob Woodall	Carolyn Bourdeaux
Party	Republican	Democratic
Popular vote	140,430	140,011
Percentage	50.1%	49.9%
- County results Woodall: 60–70% Bourdeaux: 50–60%
U.S. Representative before election
Rob Woodall
Republican
Elected U.S. Representative
Rob Woodall
Republican

The incumbent was Republican Rob Woodall, who had represented the district since 2011. He was re-elected with 60% of the vote in 2016. This was one of 80 Republican-held House districts targeted by the Democratic Congressional Campaign Committee in 2018.

=== Republican primary ===
==== Candidates ====
===== Nominee =====
- Rob Woodall, incumbent U.S. representative

===== Eliminated in primary =====
- Shane Hazel, business developer

==== Primary results ====
Republican primary results
Party	Candidate	Votes	%
Republican	Rob Woodall (incumbent)	30,450	71.93
Republican	Shane Hazel	11,883	28.07
Total votes		42,333	100.0

=== Democratic primary ===
==== Candidates ====
===== Nominee =====
- Carolyn Bourdeaux, policy professor at Georgia State University

===== Eliminated in primary =====
- Kathleen Allen, risk management consultant
- Mellisa Davis, financial manager
- David J. Kim, publisher
- Ethan Pham, small business owner
- Steve Reilly, attorney

==== Endorsements ====
Carolyn Bourdeaux (D)

U.S. senators

- Max Cleland, United States senator from Georgia (1997–2003)

U.S. representatives

- Hank Johnson, U.S. representative from Georgia's 4th congressional district (2007–present)
- Andrew Young, U.S. representative from Georgia's 5th congressional district (1973–1977)

Labor unions

- AFL-CIO

Organizations

- EMILY's List
- End Citizens United

==== Debate ====
2018 Georgia's 7th congressional district Democratic primary debate
No.	Date	Host	Moderator	Link	Democratic	Democratic	Democratic	Democratic	Democratic	Democratic
Key: P Participant A Absent N Not invited I Invited W Withdrawn										
Key: P Participant A Absent N Not invited I Invited W Withdrawn					Kathleen Allen	Carolyn Bourdeaux	Mellisa Davis	David J. Kim	Ethan Pham	Steve Reilly
1	May 7, 2018	Georgia Public Broadcasting	Karyn Greer		P	P	P	P	P	P

==== Primary results ====
Results by county: Bourdeaux: 30–40%; Kim: 20–30%

Democratic primary results
Party	Candidate	Votes	%
Democratic	Carolyn Bourdeaux	8,662	27.28
Democratic	David J. Kim	8,249	25.98
Democratic	Ethan Pham	5,666	17.84
Democratic	Melissa Davis	4,340	13.67
Democratic	Kathleen Allen	3,500	11.02
Democratic	Steve Reilly	1,335	4.20
Total votes		31,752	100.00

==== Runoff results ====
Runoff results by county: Bourdeaux: 60–70%; Kim: 50–60%

Democratic primary runoff results
Party	Candidate	Votes	%
Democratic	Carolyn Bourdeaux	8,114	51.82
Democratic	David J. Kim	7,545	48.18
Total votes		15,659	100.00

=== General election ===
==== Endorsements ====
Rob Woodall (R)

Organizations

- BIPAC
- Council for Citizens Against Government Waste
- Family Research Council
- NRA Political Victory Fund
Carolyn Bourdeaux (D)

Federal officials

- Barack Obama, 44th president of the United States

State legislators

- Stacey Abrams, former state representative and former Minority Leader of the Georgia House of Representatives

Labor unions

- AFL-CIO
- Georgia Association of Educators
- International Brotherhood of Boilermakers
- United Auto Workers

Organizations

- Democratic Congressional Campaign Committee "Red to Blue" Program
- EMILY's List
- End Citizens United
- MoveOn

Individuals

- Ethan Pham

==== Polling ====
Poll source	Date(s) administered	Sample size	Margin of error	Rob Woodall (R)	Carolyn Bourdeaux (D)	Undecided
JMC Analytics/Bold Blue Campaigns	October 13–18, 2018	500	± 4.5%	49%	43%	9%
McLaughlin & Associates (R-Woodall)	October 11–14, 2018	400	–	59%	32%	9%
Tulchin Research (D-Bourdeaux)	August 9–13, 2018	400	–	44%	46%	10%

==== Predictions ====
Source	Ranking	As of
The Cook Political Report	Lean R	November 5, 2018
Inside Elections	Lean R	November 5, 2018
Sabato's Crystal Ball	Lean R	November 5, 2018
RCP	Lean R	November 5, 2018
Daily Kos	Lean R	November 5, 2018
538	Likely R	November 7, 2018
CNN	Likely R	October 31, 2018
Politico	Lean R	November 4, 2018

==== Results ====
Georgia's 7th congressional district, 2018
Party	Candidate	Votes	%
Republican	Rob Woodall (incumbent)	140,443	50.1
Democratic	Carolyn Bourdeaux	140,010	49.9
Majority		433	0.2
Total votes		280,453	100.0
Republican hold			

After a recount, the 433-vote margin made this the closest race of the 2018 House elections. It was the closest that a Democrat has come to winning this district since its creation in 1993 (it was numbered as the 4th district from 1993 to 1997, the 11th from 1997 to 2003, and has been the 7th since 2003).

== District 8 ==
2018 Georgia's 8th congressional district election
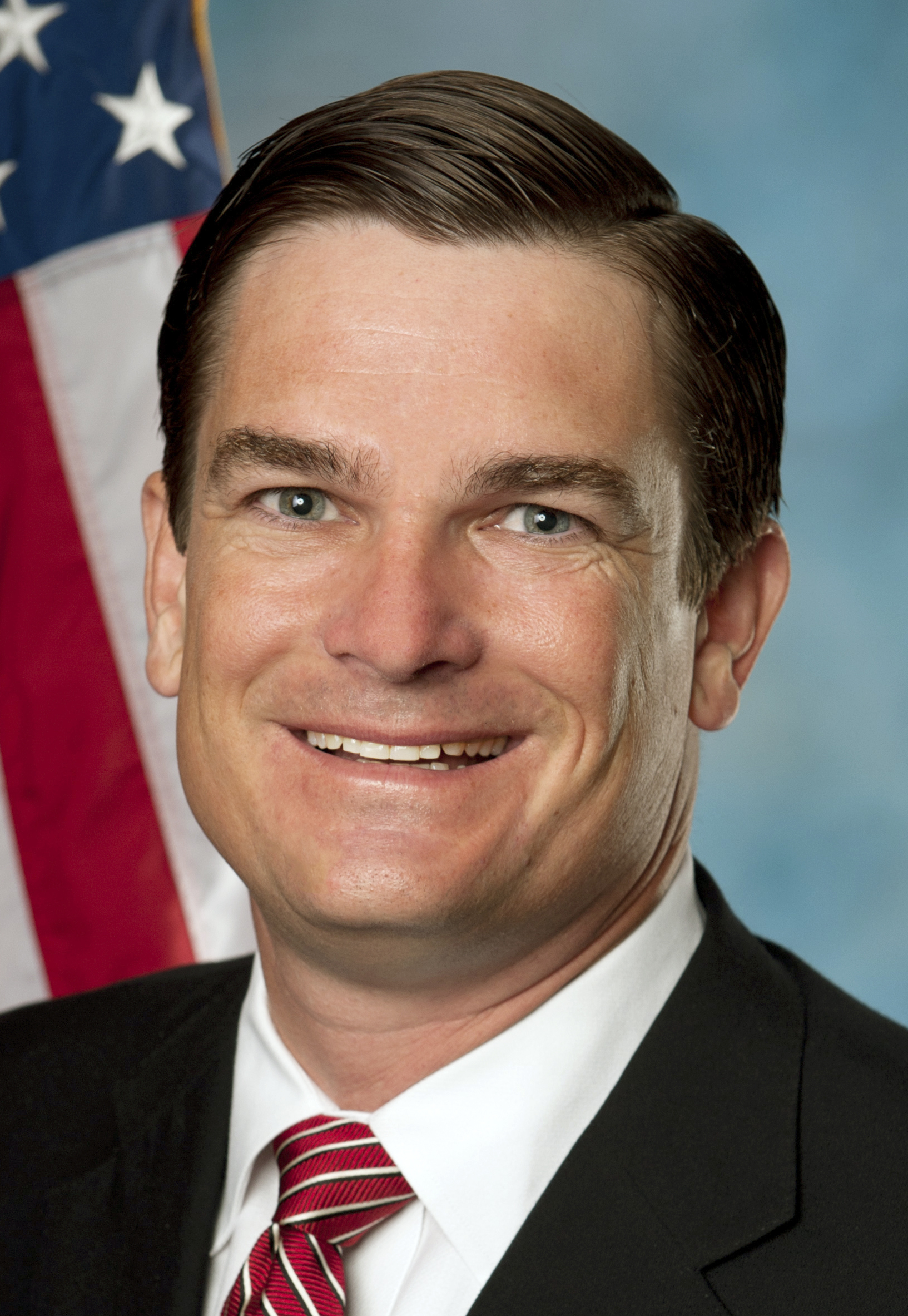
Nominee	Austin Scott
Party	Republican
Popular vote	197,401
Percentage	100%
- County results Scott: 100%
U.S. Representative before election
Austin Scott
Republican
Elected U.S. Representative
Austin Scott
Republican

The incumbent was Republican Austin Scott, who had represented the district since 2011. He was re-elected with 68% of the vote in 2016. With no primary challenger and no Democratic opposition, Rep. Scott won his 2018 midterm election for the 116th Congress of the United States, barring any further opposition by default.

=== Republican primary ===
==== Candidates ====
===== Nominee =====
- Austin Scott, incumbent U.S. representative

==== Primary results ====
Republican primary results
Party	Candidate	Votes	%
Republican	Austin Scott (incumbent)	44,467	100.0
Total votes		41,348	100.0

=== General election ===
==== Predictions ====
Source	Ranking	As of
The Cook Political Report	Safe R	November 5, 2018
Inside Elections	Safe R	November 5, 2018
Sabato's Crystal Ball	Safe R	November 5, 2018
RCP	Safe R	November 5, 2018
Daily Kos	Safe R	November 5, 2018
538	Safe R	November 7, 2018
CNN	Safe R	October 31, 2018
Politico	Safe R	November 4, 2018

==== Results ====
Georgia's 8th congressional district, 2018
Party	Candidate	Votes	%
Republican	Austin Scott (incumbent)	198,152	99.7
Green	Jimmy Cooper (write-in)	564	0.3
Total votes		198,200	100.0
Republican hold			

== District 9 ==
2018 Georgia's 9th congressional district election
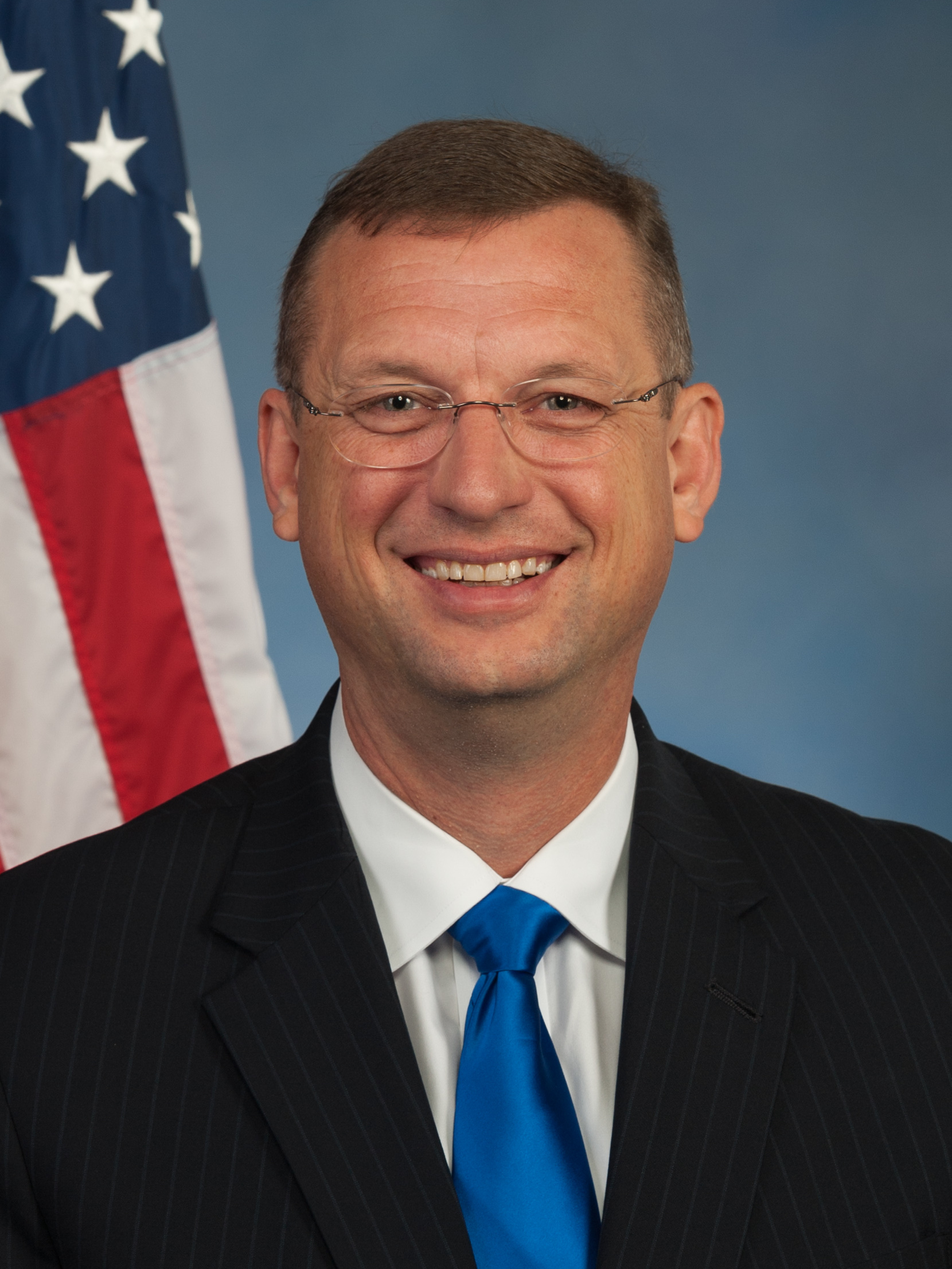

Nominee	Doug Collins	Josh McCall
Party	Republican	Democratic
Popular vote	224,661	57,912
Percentage	79.5%	20.5%
- County results Collins: 60–70% 70–80% 80–90% McCall: 70–80%
U.S. Representative before election
Doug Collins
Republican
Elected U.S. Representative
Doug Collins
Republican

The incumbent was Republican Doug Collins, who had represented northeastern Georgia since 2013. He was re-elected unopposed in 2016.

=== Republican primary ===
- Doug Collins, incumbent U.S. representative

==== Primary results ====
Republican primary results
Party	Candidate	Votes	%
Republican	Doug Collins (incumbent)	63,646	100.0
Total votes		63,646	100.0

=== Democratic primary ===
==== Candidates ====
===== Nominee =====
- Josh McCall, teacher

===== Eliminated in primary =====
- Dave Cooper

==== Primary results ====
Democratic primary results
Party	Candidate	Votes	%
Democratic	Josh McCall	6,949	52.73
Democratic	Dave Cooper	6,230	47.27
Total votes		13,179	100.00

=== General election ===
==== Predictions ====
Source	Ranking	As of
The Cook Political Report	Safe R	November 5, 2018
Inside Elections	Safe R	November 5, 2018
Sabato's Crystal Ball	Safe R	November 5, 2018
RCP	Safe R	November 5, 2018
Daily Kos	Safe R	November 5, 2018
538	Safe R	November 7, 2018
CNN	Safe R	October 31, 2018
Politico	Safe R	November 4, 2018

==== Endorsements ====
Josh McCall (D)

Labor unions

- AFL-CIO
- International Brotherhood of Boilermakers

Organizations

- Indivisible

==== Results ====
Georgia's 9th congressional district, 2018
Party	Candidate	Votes	%
Republican	Doug Collins (incumbent)	224,661	79.5
Democratic	Josh McCall	57,912	20.5
Total votes		282,573	100.0
Republican hold			

== District 10 ==
2018 Georgia's 10th congressional district election
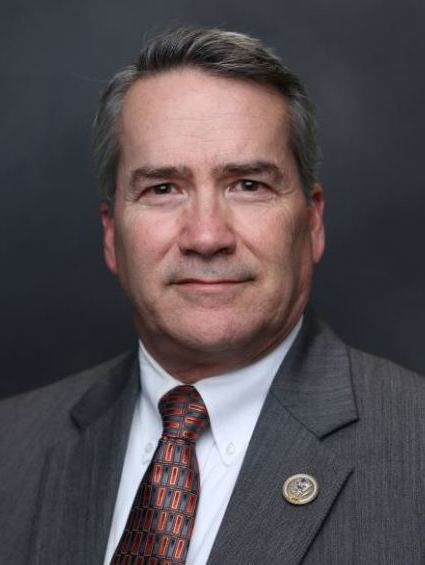

Nominee	Jody Hice	Tabitha Johnson-Green
Party	Republican	Democratic
Popular vote	190,396	112,339
Percentage	62.9%	37.1%
- County results Hice: 50–60% 60–70% 70–80% >90% Johnson-Green: 50–60% 60–70% 70–80%
U.S. Representative before election
Jody Hice
Republican
Elected U.S. Representative
Jody Hice
Republican

The incumbent was Republican Jody Hice, who had represented the district since 2015. He was re-elected unopposed in 2016.

=== Republican primary ===
==== Candidates ====
===== Nominee =====
- Jody Hice, incumbent U.S. representative

===== Eliminated in primary =====
- Bradley Griffin, businessman
- Joe Hunt, businessman

==== Debate ====
2018 Georgia's 10th congressional district Republican primary debate
No.	Date	Host	Moderator	Link	Republican	Republican	Republican
Key: P Participant A Absent N Not invited I Invited W Withdrawn							
Key: P Participant A Absent N Not invited I Invited W Withdrawn					Bradley Griffin	Jody Hice	Joe Hunt
1	May 7, 2018	Georgia Public Broadcasting	Jennifer Bellamy		P	P	P

==== Primary results ====
Republican primary results
Party	Candidate	Votes	%
Republican	Jody Hice (incumbent)	42,960	78.90
Republican	Bradley Griffin	5,846	10.74
Republican	Joe Hunt	5,644	10.37
Total votes		54,450	100.0

=== Democratic primary ===
==== Candidates ====
===== Nominee =====
- Tabitha A. Johnson-Green, registered nurse

===== Eliminated in primary =====
- Chalis Montgomery, teacher
- Richard Dien Winfield, professor

==== Debate ====
2018 Georgia's 10th congressional district Democratic primary debate
No.	Date	Host	Moderator	Link	Democratic	Democratic	Democratic
Key: P Participant A Absent N Not invited I Invited W Withdrawn							
Key: P Participant A Absent N Not invited I Invited W Withdrawn					Tabitha Johnson-Green	Chalis Montgomery	Richard Dien Winfield
1	May 7, 2018	The Atlanta Press Club			P	P	

==== Primary results ====
Democratic primary results
Party	Candidate	Votes	%
Democratic	Tabitha A. Johnson-Green	17,020	50.20
Democratic	Chalis Montgomery	8,971	26.46
Democratic	Richard Dien Winfield	7,911	23.33
Total votes		33,902	100.00

=== General election ===
==== Predictions ====
Source	Ranking	As of
The Cook Political Report	Safe R	November 5, 2018
Inside Elections	Safe R	November 5, 2018
Sabato's Crystal Ball	Safe R	November 5, 2018
RCP	Safe R	November 5, 2018
Daily Kos	Safe R	November 5, 2018
538	Safe R	November 7, 2018
CNN	Safe R	October 31, 2018
Politico	Safe R	November 4, 2018

==== Results ====
Georgia's 10th congressional district, 2018
Party	Candidate	Votes	%
Republican	Jody Hice (incumbent)	190,396	62.9
Democratic	Tabitha Johnson-Green	112,339	37.1
Total votes		302,735	100.0
Republican hold			

== District 11 ==
2018 Georgia's 11th congressional district election
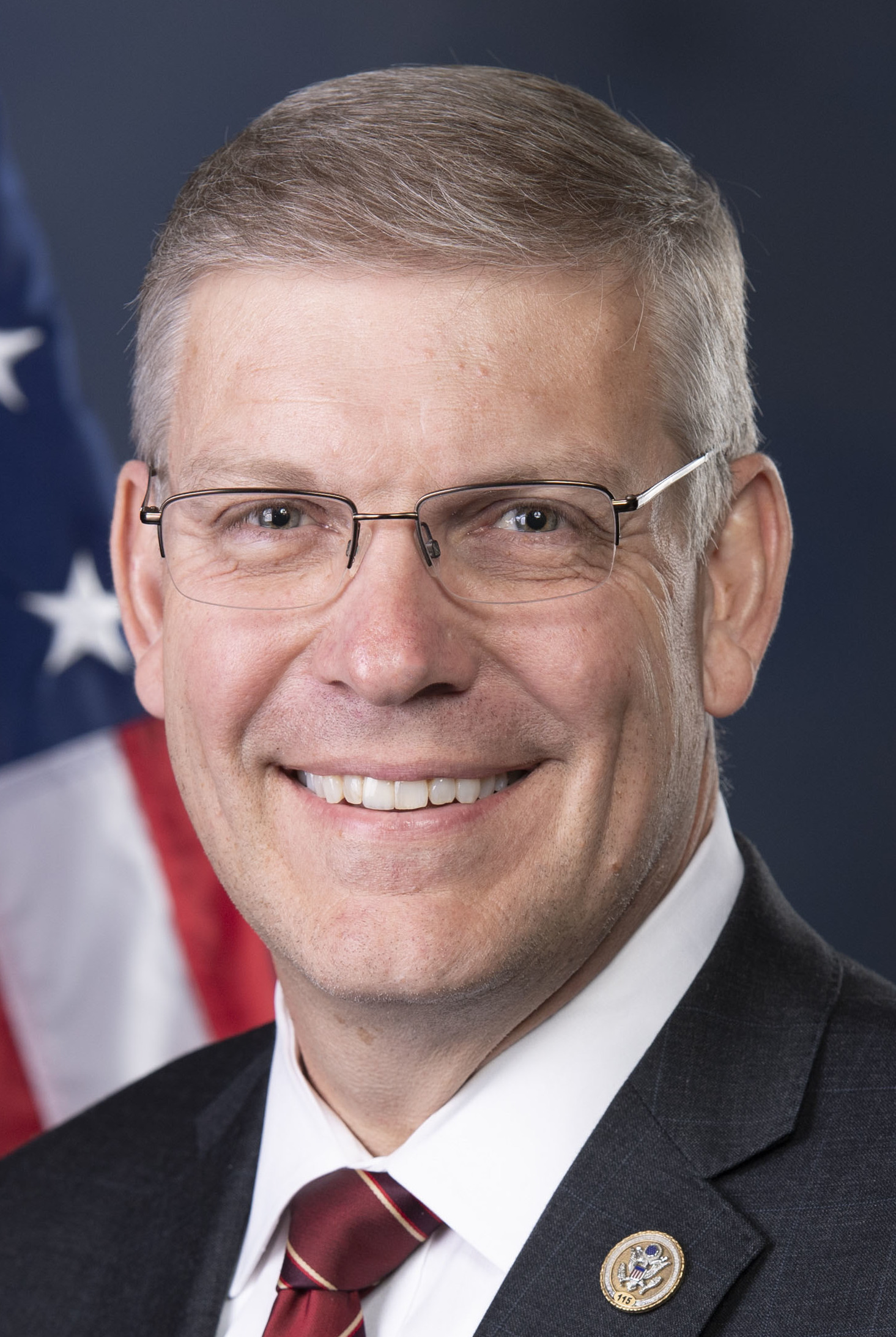

Nominee	Barry Loudermilk	Flynn Broady
Party	Republican	Democratic
Popular vote	191,887	118,653
Percentage	61.8%	38.2%
- County results Loudermilk: 50–60% 70–80% Broady: 50–60%
U.S. Representative before election
Barry Loudermilk
Republican
Elected U.S. Representative
Barry Loudermilk
Republican

The incumbent was Republican Barry Loudermilk, who had represented the district since 2015. He was re-elected with 67% of the vote in 2016.

=== Republican primary ===
==== Candidates ====
===== Nominee =====
- Barry Loudermilk, incumbent U.S. representative

==== Primary results ====
Republican primary results
Party	Candidate	Votes	%
Republican	Barry Loudermilk (incumbent)	43,309	100.0
Total votes		43,309	100.0

=== Democratic primary ===
==== Candidates ====
===== Nominee =====
- Flynn Broady, attorney

===== Withdrawn =====
- Harry Braun, renewable energy consultant and nominee for Arizona's 1st congressional district in 1984 & 1986

==== Primary results ====
Democratic primary results
Party	Candidate	Votes	%
Democratic	Flynn Broady	21,621	100.0
Total votes		21,621	100.0

=== General election ===
==== Predictions ====
Source	Ranking	As of
The Cook Political Report	Safe R	November 5, 2018
Inside Elections	Safe R	November 5, 2018
Sabato's Crystal Ball	Safe R	November 5, 2018
RCP	Safe R	November 5, 2018
Daily Kos	Safe R	November 5, 2018
538	Safe R	November 7, 2018
CNN	Safe R	October 31, 2018
Politico	Safe R	November 4, 2018

==== Endorsements ====
Flynn Broady (D)

Labor unions

- AFL-CIO
- International Brotherhood of Boilermakers

==== Results ====
Georgia's 11th congressional district, 2018
Party	Candidate	Votes	%
Republican	Barry Loudermilk (incumbent)	191,887	61.8
Democratic	Flynn Broady	118,653	38.2
Total votes		310,540	100.0
Republican hold			

== District 12 ==
2018 Georgia's 12th congressional district election
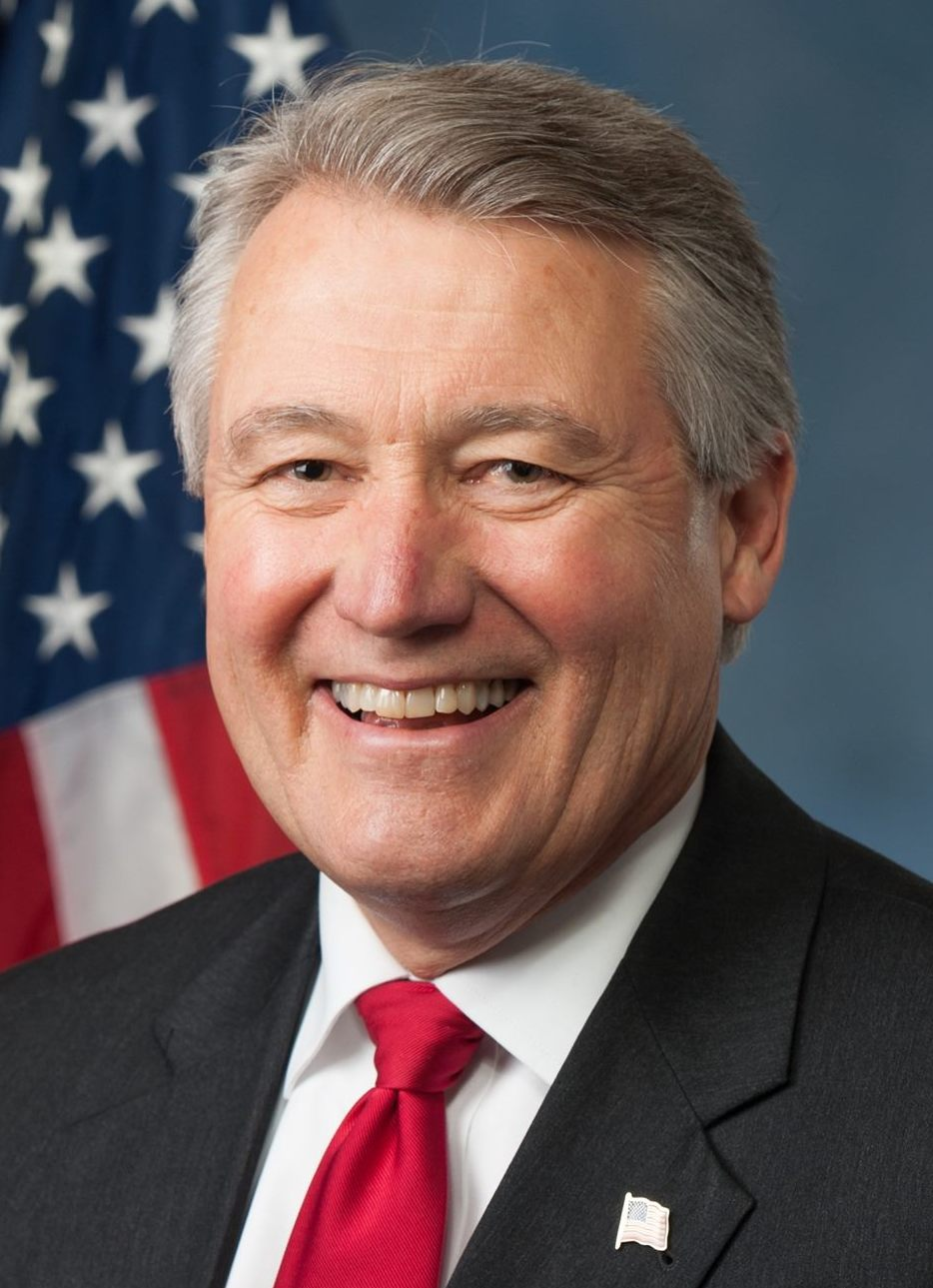

Nominee	Rick Allen	Francys Johnson
Party	Republican	Democratic
Popular vote	148,986	101,503
Percentage	59.5%	40.5%
- County results Allen: 50–60% 60–70% 70–80% 80–90% Johnson: 60–70%
U.S. Representative before election
Rick W. Allen
Republican
Elected U.S. Representative
Rick W. Allen
Republican

The incumbent was Republican Rick Allen, who had represented the district since 2015. He was re-elected with 62% of the vote in 2016.

=== Republican primary ===
==== Candidates ====
===== Nominee =====
- Rick W. Allen, incumbent U.S. representative

===== Eliminated in primary =====
- Eugene Yu, businessman and candidate for this seat in 2014 & 2016

==== Primary results ====
Republican primary results
Party	Candidate	Votes	%
Republican	Rick W. Allen (Incumbent)	37,776	75.99
Republican	Eugene Yu	11,938	24.01
Total votes		49,714	100.00

=== Democratic primary ===
==== Candidates ====
===== Nominee =====
- Francys Johnson, lawyer and pastor

===== Eliminated in primary =====
- Robert Ingham, tax preparer
- Trent Nesmith, businessman

==== Primary results ====
Democratic primary results
Party	Candidate	Votes	%
Democratic	Francys Johnson	16,991	52.86
Democratic	Robert Ingham	10,011	31.15
Democratic	Trent Nesmith	5,139	15.99
Total votes		32,141	100.0

=== General election ===
==== Predictions ====
Source	Ranking	As of
The Cook Political Report	Safe R	November 5, 2018
Inside Elections	Safe R	November 5, 2018
Sabato's Crystal Ball	Safe R	November 5, 2018
RCP	Safe R	November 5, 2018
Daily Kos	Safe R	November 5, 2018
538	Safe R	November 7, 2018
CNN	Safe R	October 31, 2018
Politico	Safe R	November 4, 2018

==== Debate ====
2018 Georgia's 12th congressional district debate
No.	Date	Host	Moderator	Link	Republican	Democratic
Key: P Participant A Absent N Not invited I Invited W Withdrawn						
Key: P Participant A Absent N Not invited I Invited W Withdrawn					Rick W. Allen	Francys Johnson
1	Oct. 23, 2018	Georgia Public Broadcasting	Brad Means		P	P

==== Endorsements ====
Francys Johnson (D)

Labor unions

- AFL-CIO
- International Brotherhood of Boilermakers

Organizations

- MoveOn

==== Results ====
Georgia's 12th congressional district, 2018
Party	Candidate	Votes	%
Republican	Rick W. Allen (Incumbent)	148,986	59.5
Democratic	Francys Johnson	101,503	40.5
Majority		47,483	19.0
Total votes		250,489	100.0
Republican hold			

== District 13 ==
2018 Georgia's 13th congressional district election
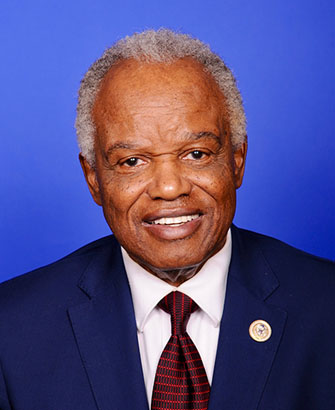

Nominee	David Scott	David Callahan
Party	Democratic	Republican
Popular vote	223,157	69,760
Percentage	76.2%	23.8%
- County results Scott: 60–70% 70–80% 80–90% >90%
U.S. Representative before election
David Scott
Democratic
Elected U.S. Representative
David Scott
Democratic

The incumbent was Democrat David Scott, who had represented the district since 2003. He was re-elected unopposed in 2016.

=== Democratic primary ===
- David Scott, incumbent U.S. representative

==== Primary results ====
Democratic primary results
Party	Candidate	Votes	%
Democratic	David Scott (incumbent)	56,216	100.0
Total votes		56,216	100.0

=== Republican primary ===
==== Candidates ====
===== Nominee =====
- David Callahan, part-time driver

===== Eliminated in primary =====
- Femi Akinkugbe, TSA security

==== Primary results ====
Republican primary results
Party	Candidate	Votes	%
Republican	David Callahan	17,475	93.0
Republican	Femi Akinkugbe	1,315	7.0
Total votes		18,790	100.0

=== General election ===
==== Predictions ====
Source	Ranking	As of
The Cook Political Report	Safe D	November 5, 2018
Inside Elections	Safe D	November 5, 2018
Sabato's Crystal Ball	Safe D	November 5, 2018
RCP	Safe D	November 5, 2018
Daily Kos	Safe D	November 5, 2018
538	Safe D	November 7, 2018
CNN	Safe D	October 31, 2018
Politico	Safe D	November 4, 2018

==== Endorsements ====
David Scott (D)

Labor unions

- AFL-CIO
- International Brotherhood of Boilermakers

==== Results ====
Georgia's 13th congressional district, 2018
Party	Candidate	Votes	%
Democratic	David Scott (incumbent)	223,157	76.2
Republican	David Callahan	69,760	23.8
Total votes		292,917	100.0
Democratic hold			

== District 14 ==
2018 Georgia's 14th congressional district election
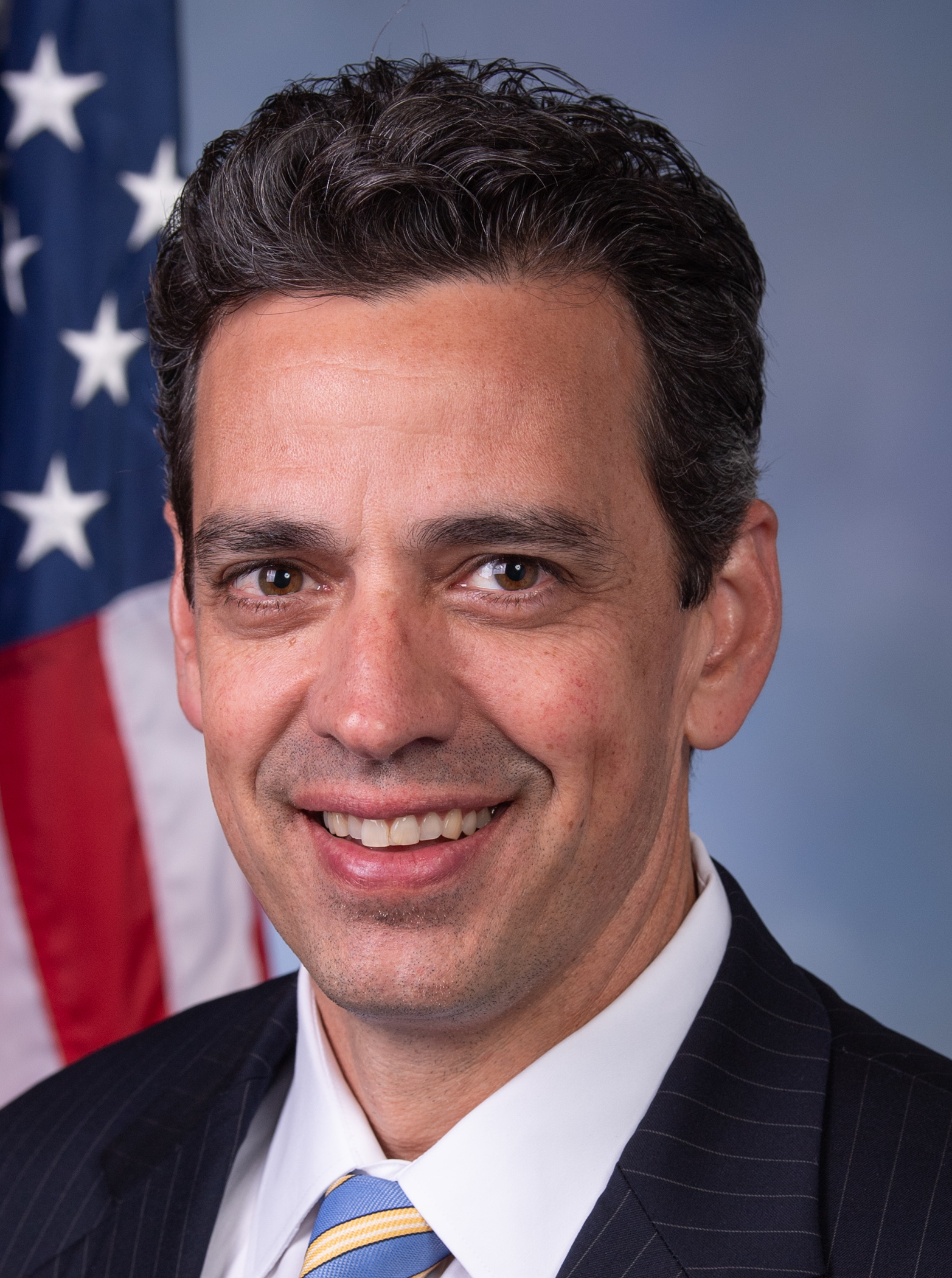

Nominee	Tom Graves	Steven Lamar Foster
Party	Republican	Democratic
Popular vote	175,743	53,981
Percentage	76.5%	23.5%
- County results Graves: 60–70% 70–80% 80–90%
U.S. Representative before election
Tom Graves
Republican
Elected U.S. Representative
Tom Graves
Republican

The incumbent was Republican Tom Graves, who represented northwestern Georgia since 2010. He was re-elected unopposed in 2016.

=== Republican primary ===
==== Candidates ====
===== Nominee =====
- Tom Graves, incumbent U.S. representative

==== Primary results ====
Republican primary results
Party	Candidate	Votes	%
Republican	Tom Graves (incumbent)	38,270	100.0
Total votes		38,270	100.0

=== Democratic primary ===
==== Candidates ====
===== Nominee =====
- Steven Lamar Foster, surgeon

==== Primary results ====
Democratic primary results
Party	Candidate	Votes	%
Democratic	Steven Lamar Foster	10,627	100.0
Total votes		10,627	100.0

=== General election ===
==== Predictions ====
Source	Ranking	As of
The Cook Political Report	Safe R	November 5, 2018
Inside Elections	Safe R	November 5, 2018
Sabato's Crystal Ball	Safe R	November 5, 2018
RCP	Safe R	November 5, 2018
Daily Kos	Safe R	November 5, 2018
538	Safe R	November 7, 2018
CNN	Safe R	October 31, 2018
Politico	Safe R	November 4, 2018

==== Results ====
Georgia's 14th congressional district, 2018
Party	Candidate	Votes	%
Republican	Tom Graves (incumbent)	175,743	76.5
Democratic	Steven Lamar Foster ^{[A]}	53,981	23.5
Total votes		229,724	100.0
Republican hold			

- ^{A} Convicted for DUI in August 2018, Foster ran the race while still behind bars until election day.
