= Burruss =

Burruss is a surname. Notable people with the surname include:

- Al Burruss (1927–1986), American politician
- Julian Ashby Burruss (1876–1947), the first President of James Madison University
- Kandi Burruss, (born 1976), American R&B singer-songwriter and record producer
- Lloyd Burruss (born 1957), former American football safety

== See also ==
- Al Burruss Correctional Training Center, medium security level prison in the U.S. state of Georgia
