= Seoul Grace Church =

- Hangul: 서울은혜교회
- Hanja: 서울恩惠教會
- Revised Romanization: Seoul Eunhye Gyohoe
- McCune–Reischauer: Sŏul Ŭnhye Kyohoe

The Seoul Grace Church (서울은혜교회) is a Christian church in Gangdong-gu, Seoul, South Korea.

It was established by Pastor David Kwangshin Kim (김광신) who was the president of Grace Ministries International (GMI).

== David Kwangshin Kim ==
David Kwangshin Kim was born in South Korea as a fourth generation Christian. He graduated from Seoul National University and became a businessman in the US. He went to church every Sunday and became a born again Christian at the age of 42. Kim left his business and entered Talbot School of Theology. He led Bible studies as an elder and a theology student.

== Grace Korean Church in 1982 ==
Grace Korean Church was founded by Pastor David Kwangshin Kim in May 1982 with three families. Three years later, the church congregation grew to be about 1,000 members with an annual budget of $1,500,000.

Pastor David Kim declared Grace Korean Church as a World Mission Ministry, and allocated 50% of church budget for missions. By its fifth anniversary in 1987, the church budget exceeded two million dollars. More than a million dollars was given to world missions.

The first missionary sent from Grace Korean Church was Missionary Hwang to Guam in July 1982. Since then, Grace Korean Church has dispatched many missionaries around the world, mainly to Africa, South America, China, and to former Soviet Union territories. As of 2004, Grace Korean Church has sent out 141 missionaries in 36 countries.

In the United States, Grace Korean Church's mission activities are more than double that of the second and third top American church missions put together.

== Seoul Grace Church in 2004 ==
In 2004 Pastor Kiyoung Han was commissioned as missionary to Seoul, South Korea. Two months later Pastor David Kwangshin Kim came to Seoul Grace Church and the First Sunday service was held on November 28, 2004 at Gangdong-gu. On May 15, 2005, Seoul Grace Church's Opening Service was held. As of 2006, Seoul Grace Church, together with Grace Korean Church in the United States and GMI, sent out more than 250 missionaries to more than 50 countries. Through Grace Ministries International, churches have been planted all over the world - 2,000 in Russia, 600 in Africa, 3,000 in China, 1,000 in Vietnam and many more in South America.

The church inaugurated the GMI Missionary Training Center in April 2007 that will train 100 missionary volunteers who have graduated from theology school. The Center has a program that offers a 4-month-long overseas training as well as domestic training in real missions. Seoul Grace Church's policy does not require the students to be members of Grace Church. Students are encouraged to work as members of other churches and other organizations.
