= Marcus Dixon =

American gridiron football player and coach (born 1984)

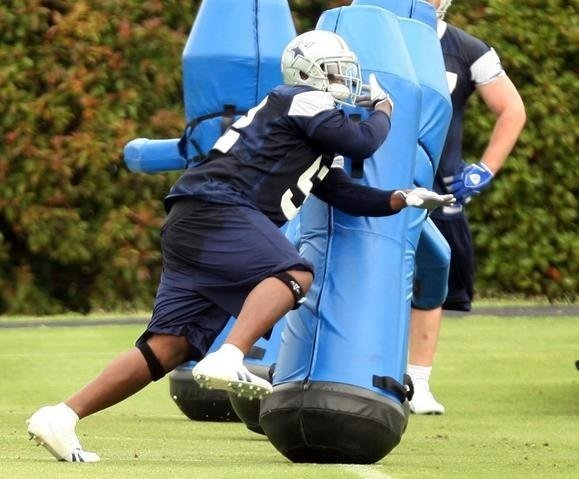
- Dixon with the Dallas Cowboys in 2009

Dallas Cowboys
- Title: Defensive line coach

Personal information
- Born: September 16, 1984 (age 42); Rome, Georgia, U.S.
- Listed height: 6 ft 4 in (1.93 m)
- Listed weight: 295 lb (134 kg)

Career information
- Position: Defensive end (No. 94)
- High school: Lindale (GA) Pepperell
- College: Hampton
- NFL draft: 2008: undrafted

Career history

Playing
- Dallas Cowboys (2008–2010)*; New York Jets (2010–2012); Kansas City Chiefs (2013)*; Tennessee Titans (2014)*; BC Lions (2014)
- * Offseason or practice squad member only

Coaching
- Hampton (2017–2018) Defensive line coach & director of player development; Hampton (2019–2020) Defensive ends coach & recruiting coordinator; Los Angeles Rams (2021) Assistant defensive line coach; Denver Broncos (2022–2023) Defensive line coach; Minnesota Vikings (2024–2025) Defensive line coach; Dallas Cowboys (2026–present) Defensive line coach

Awards and highlights
- As coach: Super Bowl champion (LVI); As player: First-team All-MEAC (2007); Second-team All-MEAC (2006)

Career NFL statistics
- Games played: 22
- Total tackles: 21
- Sacks: 2.5
- Forced fumbles: 1
- Stats at Pro Football Reference
- Stats at CFL.ca (archive)

Marcus Dwayne Dixon (born September 16, 1984) is an American football coach and a former player who is the defensive line coach for the Dallas Cowboys of the National Football League (NFL). He played in the NFL as a defensive end.

Dixon played college football for the Hampton Pirates. He was signed by the Cowboys as an undrafted free agent in 2008. He also played for the New York Jets.

Dixon is also known for a 2003 court case in which, whilst still at high school, he was convicted of statutory rape and aggravated child molestation. The latter charge was later overturned by the Georgia Supreme Court.

== Early life ==
Dixon was a grade A student and excelled on the football field to the point where he had been offered a full scholarship at Vanderbilt University, which he was unable to undertake due to his subsequent imprisonment.

== College career ==
Upon his release from prison, Dixon accepted a football scholarship from Division I-AA Hampton University in Hampton, Virginia.

== Professional career ==
Pre-draft measurables
Height	Weight	Arm length	Hand span	40-yard dash	10-yard split	20-yard split	20-yard shuttle	Three-cone drill	Vertical jump	Broad jump	Bench press
6 ft 4 in (1.93 m)	292 lb (132 kg)	33 1/4 in (0.84 m)	8 3/4 in (0.22 m)	5.14 s	1.76 s	3.00 s	4.56 s	7.28 s	31.5 in (0.80 m)	9 ft 3 in (2.82 m)	21 reps
All values from NFL Combine/Pro Day

=== Dallas Cowboys ===
In 2010, Dixon saw limited playing time during preseason. He was released on September 4, 2010.

=== New York Jets ===
On September 5, 2010, Dixon was claimed off waivers by the New York Jets.

An exclusive rights free agent, Dixon was signed to a one-year contract on January 26, 2011.

Dixon was released on September 1, 2012. He was re-signed to the active roster on September 4. He appeared in 3 games, before being released on September 24.

=== Kansas City Chiefs ===
On February 9, 2013, Dixon was signed by the Kansas City Chiefs. He was cut on August 31.

=== Tennessee Titans ===
On January 3, 2014, Dixon was signed to a futures contract with the Tennessee Titans. He was released during final cuts on August 29.

=== BC Lions ===
On October 20, 2014, Dixon was signed to the BC Lions practice roster in the Canadian Football League. Dixon made his CFL debut in the final game of the regular season against the Calgary Stampeders. He was re-signed on March 2, 2015. Dixon retired from professional baseball on April 30.

== Coaching career ==
=== Rams ===
The Los Angeles Rams hired Dixon as their assistant defensive line coach on February 23, 2021. Dixon won his first Super Bowl championship when the Rams defeated the Cincinnati Bengals in Super Bowl LVI.

=== Denver Broncos ===
On February 18, 2022, Dixon was hired by the Denver Broncos to serve as the team's defensive line coach for the 2022 season.

=== Minnesota Vikings ===
On February 9, 2024, Minnesota Vikings hired Dixon to be their new defensive line coach for both the 2024 season and the 2025 season.

=== Dallas Cowboys ===
On February 2, 2026, Dixon was hired by the Dallas Cowboys to serve as the team's defensive line coach, under new defensive coordinator, Christian Parker. On August 16, 2026, Dixon was a major reason in why Von Miller signed to the Dallas Cowboys.

== Personal life ==
=== Dixon v. State ===
Kristie Brown alleged that on February 10, 2003, Dixon forced her to have sex, taking her virginity. She has stated that contrary to Dixon's supporters' belief, she was never Dixon's girlfriend and although they shared classes, they barely knew each other. The jury acquitted Dixon of rape, battery, assault and false imprisonment, but because Brown was only 15 and Dixon 18 at the time of the incident found him guilty of statutory rape and aggravated child molestation. Because of this Dixon was convicted at the mandatory amount under Georgia law, ten years imprisonment. If he had been found guilty of rape, he would have faced a much less severe punishment.

Supporters of Dixon including the NAACP and the Rev. Joseph Lowery's People's Agenda alleged the charges were racially motivated. The President of the Children's Defense Fund, Marian Wright Edelman called it a "Legal Lynching".

=== Overturned conviction and release ===
The Georgia Supreme Court overturned Dixon's conviction for child molestation and he was released the same day, on May 3, 2004. The court let his conviction for misdemeanor statutory rape stand. After Dixon's release both he and Brown appeared on The Oprah Winfrey Show in an attempt to clarify their stories.

== See also ==
- Wilson v. State – 2006 Supreme Court of Georgia case
