= Charis Eng =

Singapore-born physician and geneticist (1962–2024)

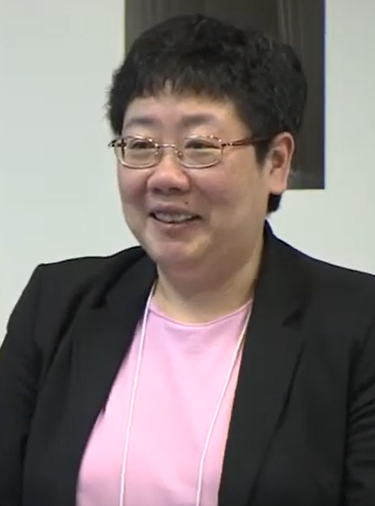
- Eng in 2011
- Born: 17 January 1962; State of Singapore
- Died: 13 August 2024 (aged 62); Cleveland, Ohio, U.S.
- Education: University of Chicago (BA, MD, PhD)
- Occupation: Clinical geneticist
- Years active: 1988–2024
- Employer: Cleveland Clinic Genomic Medicine Institute
- Known for: PTEN, genomic medicine, cancer genetics, autism
- Awards: ATA Van Meter Award, Ernst Oppenheimer Award of The Endocrine Society, and American Cancer Society
- Website: www.lerner.ccf.org/gmi/eng/

Charis Eng (17 January 1962 – 13 August 2024) was a Singaporean American physician-scientist and geneticist at the Cleveland Clinic, notable for identifying the PTEN gene. She was the chairwoman and founding director of the Genomic Medicine Institute of the Cleveland Clinic, founding director and attending clinical cancer geneticist of the institute's clinical component, the Center for Personalized Genetic Healthcare, and professor and vice chairwoman of the Department of Genetics and Genome Sciences at Case Western Reserve University School of Medicine.

== Early life and education ==
Eng was born in Singapore in 1962 to Soo Peck Eng, a lecturer at the Singapore Teacher's Training College and Siok Mui Eng. She grew up in Bristol, England. As a teenager, she moved to the United States while her father pursued his Ph.D. at the University of Chicago. She graduated from the University of Chicago Laboratory Schools and—in order to stay in the U.S. after her father returned to Singapore—matriculated in the University of Chicago at age 16, graduating in 1982. She earned her Ph.D. in Developmental Biology in 1986 and her M.D. in 1988, both from the Pritzker School of Medicine, University of Chicago. Afterwards, she completed her residency in internal medicine at Beth Israel Hospital, Boston and trained in a fellowship in medical oncology at Harvard's Dana-Farber Cancer Institute. She was formally trained in clinical cancer genetics at the University of Cambridge and the Royal Marsden NHS Trust, UK, and in laboratory-based human cancer genetics by Prof Sir Bruce Ponder. Following her training, Eng became one of only four formally-trained clinical cancer geneticists in the U.S. at the time.

== Career ==
Eng returned to the Farber as Assistant Professor of Medicine at the end of 1995, and in January 1999, joined The Ohio State University as Associate Professor of Medicine and Director of the Clinical Cancer Genetics Program. In 2001, she was appointed to the Davis Professorship and Co-Director of the Division of Human Genetics in the Department of Internal Medicine. In 2002, she was promoted to Professor and Division Director, holding the Klotz Endowed Chair.

Eng joined the Cleveland Clinic in 2005, and became the founding director of the Cleveland Clinic's Genomic Medicine Institute and the Center for Personalized Genetic Healthcare (CPGH), and Professor and Vice Chair of the Department of Genetics and Genome Sciences at Case Western Reserve University School of Medicine. Within the CPGH, Eng oversaw the PTEN Multidisciplinary Clinic for patient with PTEN-related inherited cancer disorders including Cowden syndrome and Bannayan–Riley–Ruvalcaba syndrome, one of three centers of excellence in the United States designated by the PTEN Hamartoma Tumor Syndrome Foundation.

Outside of the lab, Eng acted as the primary genetics consultant to the Discovery Health Channel documentary "Curse of the Elephant Man", which traced the genetic causes of Joseph Merrick's disfiguring disorder.

== Research ==
Eng was involved in translational research focusing on hereditary cancer syndromes. She was the first to discover a link between mutations in the cancer suppressor gene PTEN and Cowden syndrome, which predispose patients to several types of cancer, including breast, thyroid, uterine, and other cancers. From her research, Eng led the development of clinical practice guidelines in cancer screening in patients with these mutations. Eng was also involved in discovering a link between PTEN and autism, one of the first associations between the latter condition and inherited cancer syndromes.

Her scientific accomplishments have set the practice model for how to apply laboratory-based genetics and genomics in the pre-symptomatic diagnosis, counseling and management of patients and their as-yet unaffected family members. Dr Eng's two major investigative models on RET and related genes in multiple endocrine neoplasia type 2 (MEN 2; characterized by medullary thyroid cancer, pheochromocytoma and hyperparathyroidism), and PTEN in Cowden syndrome (high risk of breast and thyroid cancers) have been acknowledged as the paradigm for the practice of clinical cancer genetics.

== Personal life and death ==
Eng was a wine enthusiast, a passion she developed during her post-doctoral research at the University of Cambridge.

Eng died in Cleveland on 13 August 2024, at the age of 62.

== Awards and honors ==
- Elected to the American Society for Clinical Investigation, 2001
- Doris Duke Distinguished Clinical Scientist Award, 2002
- Elected to the American Association for the Advancement of Science (AAAS), 2003
- Elected to the Association of American Physicians (AAP), 2004
- Local Legend from Ohio, bestowed by the American Medical Women's Association in conjunction with the US Senate on women physicians who have demonstrated commitment, originality, innovation and/or creativity in their fields of medicine, 2005
- American Cancer Society Clinical Research Professor, 2009
- Served on US Department of Health and Human Services Secretary's Advisory Committee on Genetics, Health and Society, 2009–2011
- Elected to the National Academy of Medicine, 2010
- American Medical Association Women Physicians' Section Mentorship Recognition, 2013
- American Medical Women's Association Exceptional Mentor Award, 2014
- University of Chicago Medical Alumni Distinguished Service Award, 2015
- University of Chicago Alumni Association Professional Achievement Award, 2017
- American Cancer Society (National) Medal of Honor (Clinical Research), 2018
- Top 0.01% Impactful Scientists (all fields) in the World, 2019
- AAAS Fellow Special Digital Ribbon for extraordinary achievements advancing science, 2020
- University of Chicago Laboratory Schools Distinguished Alumna Award, 2021
