= Wilson v. State =

2006 Supreme Court of Georgia case

- Court: Monroe County Superior Court
- Full case name: Genarlow Wilson v. State of Georgia
- Decided: April 28, 2006

Case history
- Prior actions: State v. Wilson (trial in Douglas Superior Court); Wilson v. State 279 Ga. App. 459 (appeal to Court of Appeals of Georgia); Wilson v. State 2006 Ga. LEXIS 1036 (application to Supreme Court of Georgia for certiorari denied)
- Subsequent action: Appeal granted Supreme Court of Georgia October 26, 2007

Court membership
- Judge sitting: Judge Thomas Wilson

Case opinions
- new conviction of "misdemeanor aggravated child molestation" substituted for original conviction of "aggravated child molestation"

Wilson v. State, 652 S.E. 2d 501, 282 Ga. 520 (2007) was a Georgia court case brought about to appeal the aggravated child molestation conviction of Genarlow Wilson (born April 8, 1986, to Juanessa Bennett and Marlow Wilson).

Wilson was convicted of aggravated child molestation in 2005, after, at the age of 17, he had engaged in oral sex with a 15-year-old at a New Year's Eve party, an offense carrying a mandatory penalty of 10 years' imprisonment.

At the time of his conviction, provisions for similarity in age that allowed underage consent to be taken into account were only applicable to vaginal sex. As the case involved oral sex, the consent of the girl was not at that time legally relevant.

On October 26, 2007, the Georgia State Supreme Court, while not overturning the conviction itself, ruled that Wilson's sentence was disproportionate. He was released later that day, after serving over 4 years of his 10-year prison sentence in the Al Burruss Correctional Training Center in Forsyth, Georgia.

== Background ==
Genarlow Wilson was a high school football player. A moderate star, Wilson had held Calvin Johnson to just 4 catches in 2 games.

During a private New Year's Eve party that Wilson attended in a Days Inn motel room in the small town of Douglasville, Georgia, in 2003, when he was 17 years old, multiple sex acts took place. Wilson engaged in oral sex with a 15-year-old girl, and the girl later stated consistently that the act was consensual; the girl was recorded having oral sex with several boys in succession, including Wilson. At the time, Wilson was an honor student, star athlete, and homecoming king.

Additionally, Wilson engaged in sex with a 17-year-old girl, who woke up the next morning naked and disoriented and claimed to have been raped, which triggered an investigation. Police found condoms and evidence of drinking, as well as a video camera with footage of Wilson engaging in the sex acts, in the motel room used for the party. In the video, the 17-year-old girl appeared sleepy or intoxicated during the sex act, but did not ask Wilson to stop.

== Legal process ==
=== Initial trial and plea deal ===
The then-15-year-old girl has repeatedly stated that her act of oral sex with Wilson was consensual; however, as a legal matter she could not consent. The jury acquitted Wilson of the rape charge. But, as the age of consent in Georgia is 16, they voted to convict him of aggravated child molestation for the oral sex incident. Some jury members later complained they had not understood that the verdict would result in a 10-year minimum sentence, plus one year on probation.

Wilson received the 10-year sentence following his refusal to enter into a proposed plea bargain, as he stated that his adamant belief was that "It's all about doing what's right ... And what's right is right, and what's wrong is wrong. And I'm just standing up for what I believe in." His decision to reject the plea agreement, as well as his continued fight to overturn his conviction, takes into account that sex offenders in Georgia must register themselves and are subject to penalty laws for life, and that the law was not intended to penalize teenage partners. As the law stands, Wilson would not even have been able to return to his own family after an early release, as he had an 8-year-old sister Jiaya Bennett with whom he would be forbidden contact. The other young males involved (including one charged for the same oral sex acts as Wilson) accepted plea bargains with the possibility of parole; they were required to register as convicted sex offenders. Wilson had been offered a plea bargain for a five-year sentence with the possibility of parole before the trial but rejected the offer. After the jury had returned the guilty verdict, the prosecutor offered the same 5-year plea bargain again, and Wilson refused again. Another young man involved in the case who had accepted a similar 5-year plea bargain was paroled after two years.

=== Legislative action ===
In part because of the publicity surrounding this case, the law under which Wilson was convicted was changed after his conviction; the act would now be treated as a misdemeanor with a maximum sentence of one year in prison, and no sex offender registration. While Wilson's attorneys argued that such a change in the law should reverse his conviction, the Legislature specifically prohibited the bill from being applied retroactively.

A bipartisan group of legislators introduced a bill in the 2007 Georgia legislative session that would allow Wilson's sentence to be reduced by the courts. This session was adjourned in April, before the bill could be considered. Several legislators have subsequently called for a rare special session of the Legislature to reconsider the bill.

After the trial ended, the District Attorney's office received numerous open record requests for the videotape. David McDade inquired of the Prosecuting Attorneys' Council of Georgia whether the videotape had to be released under the Open Records Act. The Council concluded that "if no one has filed for a protection order ... claiming that disclosure of the video tape would invade individual privacy, we can find no reason why disclosure of the video tape is not required under ... the Open Records Act." Ignoring the fact that it was the Legislature that wrote the Open Records Law (and which caused the initial controversy by refusing to apply the "Romeo and Juliet" clause retroactively), Georgia State Sen. Emanuel Jones said he would introduce legislation to block district attorneys from handing over photographic images in sex cases. "'I'm going to call it the David McDade Act,' Jones said. 'Sometimes we have to protect our kids from district attorneys.'" As the participants shown having sex in the video were under 18, the videotape constitutes child pornography under federal law. The Adam Walsh Child Protection and Safety Act prohibits prosecutors from allowing defendants in criminal proceedings to possess a copy of any evidence that constitutes child pornography, even if the purpose is to mount a defense against the charge. Under this law, Wilson and his defense team are prohibited from having a copy of the videotape that prosecutor McDade has distributed to anyone else who has requested it.

=== Appeals ===
The case was appealed to the Georgia Supreme Court; the court twice refused to hear the case, with the presiding judge delivering an opinion that said she was "very sympathetic to Wilson's argument" but that she was bound by the Legislature's decision to make the law not apply retroactively.

The governor does not have pardon power in Georgia, but the prosecutor has the power to set aside the verdict. The prosecutor Eddie Barker, apparently waiting for an admission of guilt, has said "the one person who can change things at this point is Genarlow. The ball's in his court."

=== Habeas petition ===
In response to a petition of habeas corpus filed by Wilson's attorneys, the Superior Court of Monroe County in the State of Georgia reduced Wilson's charge to misdemeanor aggravated child molestation, ordered that his name not be placed on the sex-offender registry, and resentenced him to 12 months and with credit for time served. Stated Judge Thomas Wilson (no relation), "The fact that Genarlow Wilson has spent two years in prison for what is now classified as a misdemeanor, and without assistance from this Court, will spend eight more years in prison, is a grave miscarriage of justice."

Georgia's Attorney General Thurbert Baker has appealed Judge Wilson's decision, staying Genarlow Wilson's release. Baker maintains the judge did not have the authority to overturn the conviction and says there is a plea bargain offer on the table.

According to Baker, the plea deal could allow Wilson to be eligible for First Offender Treatment, which would mean that he would not have a criminal record nor would he be subject to registering on the sex offender registry once his sentence had been completed. It could also result in Wilson receiving a reduced sentence, possibly leading to his release based upon time already served. Wilson's lawyer, B.J. Bernstein, would not accept the proposed deal because it would require her client to plead guilty to a felony with a fifteen-year sentence, forcing him to register as a sexual offender for up to fifteen years.

==== Bond hearing ====
Following the grant of habeas and Baker's appeal, Bernstein urged prosecutors to allow her client to be set free on bond until his appeal could be heard. Whitney Tilson, a New York City hedge fund manager and philanthropist, and others offered to finance a million dollar bond on Wilson's behalf.

However, District Attorney McDade said that Wilson's crime, aggravated child molestation, was one that did not allow Wilson to be released on bond. Douglas County Superior Court Judge David Emerson agreed with McDade, and canceled a scheduled bond hearing. Bernstein announced that she would file an appeal.

==== Georgia Supreme Court appeal hearing ====
On July 9, 2007, the Georgia State Supreme Court set a hearing for Genarlow Wilson's appeal for July 20, 2007, more than two months earlier than previously scheduled. The first motion was an appeal by the State Attorney General Baker of the Monroe County Superior Court judge's decision to reduce Wilson's felony conviction to a misdemeanor and release him. The second motion was brought by Wilson's attorneys to have him released on bond while the appeals are heard which the Douglas County Superior Court judge denied.

==== Wilson's release ====
On October 26, 2007, the Georgia State Supreme Court ruled 4–3 that Wilson's sentence was cruel and unusual, and ordered him released. He was released from prison in the late afternoon that day. The majority opinion said that the changes in the law (which made oral sex between minors a misdemeanor instead of a felony) "represent a seismic shift in the legislature's view of the gravity of oral sex between two willing teenage participants" and "reflect a decision by the people of this State that the severe felony punishment and sex offender registration imposed on Wilson make no measurable contribution to acceptable goals of punishment. ... Although society has a significant interest in protecting children from premature sexual activity, we must acknowledge that Wilson's crime does not rise to the level of culpability of adults who prey on children and that, for the law to punish Wilson as it would an adult, with the extraordinarily harsh punishment of ten years in prison without the possibility of probation or parole, appears to be grossly disproportionate to his crime."

The dissenting opinion said that the legislators had explicitly made the law non-retroactive and, therefore, should not be applied to Wilson. The majority opinion claimed, however, that it did not apply the law retroactively but instead that the punishment was unconstitutionally cruel and unusual. The dissenters argued that the precedents the majority relied upon involved legislation with no prohibitions against retroactivity.

Attorney General Baker said he would not appeal the ruling.

== Reaction ==
On December 21, 2006, The New York Times published an editorial condemning the Georgia Supreme Court's original refusal to hear Wilson's appeal, noting that Wilson was not a sexual predator, and that his behavior would have only been a misdemeanor if he had actually had sex with the girl, instead of having had oral sex (due to a loophole in the applicable law's provision intended to prevent exactly this kind of dubious conviction).

Oral sex has long had a special criminal status in Georgia law; until 1998, oral sex even between husband and wife was punishable with up to 20 years in prison. The United States Supreme Court, in 1986, originally upheld Georgia's anti-sodomy law (which covered both oral sex and anal sex) as constitutional even when applied to criminalize two consenting adults in the privacy of their bedroom (Bowers v. Hardwick, 478 U.S. 176). Twelve years later, Georgia's Supreme Court would, however, find that the same law upheld by the U.S. Supreme Court was unconstitutional on state constitutional grounds, at least as applied to oral sex with persons over the age of consent (Powell v. Georgia, S98A0755, 270 Ga. 327, 510 S.E. 2d 18 (1998)).

On April 30, 2007, The New York Times published another editorial noting that Georgia's legislature had closed the loophole in the law and that if Wilson were tried today he would now be facing only misdemeanor charges for the same act. However, the State Senate adjourned for the year without taking up a bill allowing judges to review previous cases like Wilson's and Wilson continued to serve a mandatory 10-year sentence. The Times also noted that Wilson's attorneys had applied for a writ of habeas corpus with the U.S. Supreme Court and it urged the Court to grant it. In the same editorial, the Times lambasted prosecuting district attorney David McDade for continuing to publicly charge that Wilson participated in gang-raping a different 17-year-old girl, even though he was acquitted of charges in that case.

On May 24, 2007, former US president Jimmy Carter wrote a letter to state attorney-general Thurbert Baker (who, like Wilson, is African-American) in which he questioned whether Wilson's race had played a role in his treatment. He wrote: "The racial dimension of the case is likewise hard to ignore and perhaps unfortunately has had an impact on the final outcome of the case," pointing out that white defendants have received lesser punishments for similar conduct.

Following the June ruling in Monroe County, both Attorney General Baker and Georgia Governor Sonny Perdue expressed concern that other convicted child molesters might attempt similar legal tactics to get out of prison. While Baker called the Wilson sentence "harsh", he also noted that he had taken an oath to uphold state law.

Black leaders such as Rev. Joseph Lowery, Dr. Francys Johnson, the Rev. Jesse Jackson and the Congressional Black Caucus have criticized Baker's appeal of the Monroe County ruling. Meanwhile, Rev. Markel Hutchins, a civil rights activist in Atlanta, has criticized them for not having all the facts and failing to stand up for the victims in the case. He also questioned the motivations of Wilson's attorney, Bernstein, and urged her to attempt to find a resolution in the case.

On Genarlow's behalf, the NAACP, led by Dr. Francys Johnson, also marched on Douglas County, Georgia, for the injustice done. There were many participants there, including the girl's mother who stated that she forgave Genarlow and was in favor of his release. The speakers targeted Douglas County judicial system and particularly David McDade for his unfair treatment.

== See also ==
- Marcus Dixon
- Child sexual abuse
