= Sondad railway station =

Railway Station in Maharashtra, India

General information
- Location: Sondad, Gondia district, Maharashtra; India
- Coordinates: 21.0860433°N 80.0958426°E
- Elevation: 269 metres (883 ft)
- System: Indian Railways station
- Owner: Indian Railways
- Operator: South East Central Railway zone
- Lines: Gondia–Arjuni–Nagbhir–Balharshah line Bilaspur–Nagpur section Howrah–Nagpur–Mumbai line
- Platforms: 2
- Tracks: Broad gauge 1,676 mm (5 ft 6 in)

Construction
- Structure type: At Ground
- Parking: Available
- Cycle facilities: Available

Other information
- Status: Functioning
- Station code: SNV
- Zone(s): South East Central Railway zone
- Division(s): Nagpur SEC

History
- Electrified: Yes

Passengers
- 2000

Services
Preceding station	Indian Railways	Following station
Khodseoni towards ?	South East Central Railway zone Gondia–Arjuni–Nagbhir–Balharshah line on Bilaspur–Nagpur section of Howrah–Nagpur–Mumbai line	Gond Umri towards ?
Location
- Location within India Location within Maharashtra

Sondad railway station serves Soundad and surrounding villages in Bhandara district & Gondia district of Maharashtra, India.
