= Global microbial identifier =

The genomic epidemiological database for global identification of microorganisms or global microbial identifier is a platform for storing whole genome sequencing data of microorganisms, for the identification of relevant genes and for the comparison of genomes to detect and track-and-trace infectious disease outbreaks and emerging pathogens. The database holds two types of information: 1) genomic information of microorganisms, linked to, 2) metadata of those microorganism such as epidemiological details. The database includes all genera of microorganisms: bacteria, viruses, parasites and fungi.

== Technology ==
For genotyping of microorganisms for medical diagnosis, or other purposes, scientists may use a wide variety of DNA profiling techniques, such as polymerase chain reaction, pulsed-field gel electrophoresis or multilocus sequence typing. A complication of this broad variety of techniques is the difficulty to standardize between techniques, laboratories and microorganisms, which may be overcome using the complete DNA code of the genome generated by whole genome sequencing. For straightforward diagnostic identification, the whole genome sequencing information of a microbiological sample is fed into a global genomic database and compared using BLAST procedures to the genomes already present in the database. In addition, whole genome sequencing data may be used to back calculate to the different pre-whole genome sequencing genotyping methods, so previous collected valuable information is not lost. For the global microbial identifier the genomic information is coupled to a wide spectrum of metadata about the specific microbial clone and includes important clinical and epidemiological information such as the global finding places, treatment options and antimicrobial resistance, making it a general microbiological identification tool. This makes personalized treatment of microbial disease possible as well as real-time tracing systems for global surveillance of infectious diseases for food safety and serving human health.

== The initiative ==
The initiative for building the database arose in 2011 and when several preconditions were met: 1) whole genome sequencing has become mature and serious alternative for other genotyping techniques, 2) the price of whole genome sequencing has started falling dramatically and in some cases below the price of traditional identifications, 3) vast amounts of IT resources and a fast Internet have become available, and 4) there is the idea that via a cross sectoral and One Health approach infectious diseases may be better controlled.

Starting the second millennium, many microbiological laboratories, as well as national health institutes, started genome sequencing projects for sequencing the infectious agents collections they had in their biobanks. Thereby generating private databases and sending model genomes to global nucleotide databases such as GenBank of the National Center for Biotechnology Information or the nucleotide database of the EMBL. This created a wealth of genomic information and independent databases for eukaryotic as well as prokaryotic genomes. The need to further integrate these databases and to harmonize data collection, and to link the genomic data to metadata for optimal prevention of infectious diseases, was generally recognized by the scientific community. In 2011, several infectious disease control centers and other organizations took the initiative of a series of international scientific- and policy-meetings, to develop a common platform and to better understand the potentials of an interactive microbiological genomic database. The first meeting was in Brussels, September 2011, followed by meetings in Washington (March 2012) and Copenhagen (February 2013). In addition to experts from around the globe, Intergovernmental Organizations have been included in the action, notably the World Health Organization and the World Organisation for Animal Health.

== Development plan ==
A detailed roadmap for the development of the database was set up with the following general timeline:

2010 - 2012: Development of pilot systems.
2011 - 2013: International structural start-up, with the formation of an international core group, analysis of the present and future landscape to build the database, and diplomacy efforts to bring the relevant groups together.
2012 - 2016: Development of a robust IT-backbone for the database, and development of novel genome analysis algorithms and software.
2017 - 2020: Construction of a global solution, including the creation of networks and regional hubs.

== Steering committee ==
Current members:

- Eric Brown, Food and Drug Administration, USA
- Amy Cawthorne, World Health Organization, Switzerland
- Jørgen Schlundt, Nanyang Technological University, Singapore.
- David J. Lipman, National Center for Biotechnology Information, USA.
- Alisdair Wotherspoon, Food Standards Agency, United Kingdom.
- Pathom Sawanpanyalert, Ministry of Public Health, Thailand.
- David Heyman, Health Protection Agency, United Kingdom.
- Marion Koopmans, Erasmus University Medical Center, Netherlands National Institute for Public Health and the Environment.
- Masami T. Takeuchi, Food and Agriculture Organization
- Vincenco Caporale, World Organization of Animal Health

Former members:

- Steven M. Musser, Food and Drug Administration, USA.
- Angelik Tritscher, World Health Organization, Switzerland.

== See also ==
- Human Microbiome Project
- Whole genome sequencing
- DNA profiling
- Personal Genome Project
- List of sequenced eukaryotic genomes
- List of sequenced bacterial genomes
- List of sequenced archaeal genomes
- Predictive medicine
- Personalized medicine
- DNA database
- Integrated Microbial Genomes
