= Genomic Medicine Institute =

Coordinates: 41°30′00″N 81°37′13″W

- Established: 2005
- Chair and Director: Charis Eng
- Address: 9500 Euclid Avenue, Mailstop NE-50, Cleveland Clinic
- Location: (United States) Cleveland, Ohio
- Website: http://www.lerner.ccf.org/gmi/

The Genomic Medicine Institute at the Cleveland Clinic is an inter-disciplinary institute and department that focuses on patient care, patient-oriented research, and outreach and education in personalized healthcare guided by genetics and genomics. It is located in the Center for Genomics Research Building in the Cleveland Clinic, in Cleveland, Ohio, United States of America.

== Goals of the Genomic Medicine Institute ==
The goals of the Genomic Medicine Institute (GMI) span clinical service and translational research, aiming to integrate healthcare delivery with modern human genetics and genomics. The GMI coordinates genomics research across many disciplines, including oncology, cardiology, pediatrics, endocrinology and respiratory medicine.

== Leadership ==
Charis Eng is the Chair and founding Director of the Genomic Medicine Institute. She holds the Sondra J. and Stephen R. Hardis Endowed Chair of Cancer Genomic Medicine at the Cleveland Clinic and is an American Cancer Society Clinical Research Professor. She is also Professor and Vice Chair of the Department of Genetics at Case Western Reserve University School of Medicine, and a member of the U.S. Department of Health and Human Services Secretary's Advisory Committee on Genetics, Health and Society (SACGHS). She was elected as a member of the National Academy of Science's Institute of Medicine (IOM) in 2010.

== Funding ==
The Genomic Medicine Institute is part of the Cleveland Clinic, which is a non-profit organization. Individual studies carried out at the Genomic Medicine Institute are supported by a variety of other funding mechanisms, including federal support and charitable donations.

== Clinical Care ==
The Center for Personalized Genetic Healthcare (CPGH) is a leading group in genetic health that is staffed by both specialist physicians and genetic counselors. Specifically, the patient is evaluated in the context of his or her personal medical history, family background and physical examination. A full range of genetic consultations are available, including adult/pediatric general genetics, cancer genetics, preconception/prenatal genetics and cardiovascular genetics. Specific genetic tests may be initiated following the clinical evaluation. Tailored recommendations in terms of education and health planning will be provided, and if appropriate, extended to at-risk family members. Patients may be seen as self-referrals or through physician referrals, including same-day appointments if required. These services are available at both the Main Campus as well as satellite locations of the Cleveland Clinic Health system. Patients who will benefit from genetic counseling include

- A person with a birth defect, genetic disease, or early onset of cancer
- A person with a child or close relative with a birth defect, inherited disease, or early onset of cancer
- Pregnant women aged 35 and over on due date, or with an abnormal screening result.

Adult and Pediatric General Genetics services are available at the Main Campus. Cancer Genetics services are available at Main Campus (Genomic Medicine Institute and Breast Center), Cleveland Clinic Beachwood Family Health and Surgery Center, Cleveland Clinic Independence Cancer Center, Digestive Disease Institute and Colorectal Surgery (DDI/CORS) and Fairview Hospital’s Moll Pavilion. Preconception/Prenatal Genetic Counseling services are available at Main Campus, Beachwood Family Health Center, Cleveland Clinic Independence Family Health Center and Hillcrest Hospital. Cardiovascular Genetic services are available at Main Campus. CPGH specialists are internationally known for their expertise in :

- various inherited cancer syndromes, particularly breast, thyroid, endocrine, gastrointestinal, urologic cancers, and Cowden syndrome
- adult-onset genetic disorders
- inherited cardiovascular pulmonary diseases
- Albright hereditary osteodystrophy and pseudohypoparathyroidism
- heart defects
- neuromuscular disorders
- autism
- metabolic disorders

== Research ==
Research at the Genomic Medicine Institute is focused on translational genomic medicine. Patient-oriented research protocols include studies on patients with:

- Patients with a definite or possible diagnosis of Cowden syndrome, Bannayan–Riley–Ruvalcaba syndrome, or other conditions involving a PTEN gene mutation
- Endocrine tumors such as pheochromocytoma and paragangliomas
- Unexplained hamartomatous and/or hyperplastic gastrointestinal polyps
- Chromosomal deletions, specifically the chr 2q37 deletion (brachydactyly-mental retardation syndrome)
- Familial Barrett esophagus, in association with esophageal cancer.
- Primary pulmonary hypertension
- Common disorders related to variation in non-coding genomic sequences
- Metabolic disease such as diabetes and obesity
- Clotting and bleeding disorders
- Genetically controlled absorption of plant sterols for cholesterol

== Biorepository ==
The Genomic Medicine Biorepository is a sample processing and banking facility that stores patient samples as well as derived products, such as DNA, RNA, protein and cell lines. These samples provide a foundation for all research in genomic medicine at the Cleveland Clinic. The biorepository has received, cataloged, processed, and banked, in excess of 40,000 specimens. These samples are received from both regional and international sources. The biorepository has managed samples that have resulted in more than 150 original peer reviewed articles and greater than $25 million total direct costs in extramural funding from 2005 to 2009.

== Bioinformatics Core ==
The Bioinformatics Core of the Lerner Research Institute is hosted at the Genomic Medicine Institute, and provides essential analysis for the integration of complex biological and clinical data to researchers across Lerner Research Institute, Cleveland Clinic (and beyond) either as fee-for-service or as collaborative efforts through grant support. Services provided include consultation, grant preparation, high throughput data analysis and other types of bioinformatics analysis.

== Genomics Core ==
The Genomics Core of the Lerner Research Institute is hosted at the Genomic Medicine Institute, and provides essential support for high-throughput biological studies on the genomic level. The Scientific Director is Prof Charis Eng. It is equipped with an Applied Biosystems 3730xl DNA analyzer, and provides Illumina-based services for state-of-the-art high throughput genotyping and expression experiments. Services are provided to the Lerner Research Institute, the Cleveland Clinic, and external clients.

== Training Program ==
The GMI has programs for advanced training for the following individuals:

- clinicians, both physicians and genetic counselors
- research staff at postdoctoral and predoctoral levels

Exposure to patients who have unusual genetic syndromes, with the availability of corresponding genetic expertise at the CPGH is a major strength of training at the GMI. For clinicians, there are extensive opportunities for interaction with internationally renowned clinicians at the Cleveland Clinic at clinics, tumor boards and in direct patient care.
