= David J. Kim =

American businessman

David Kim
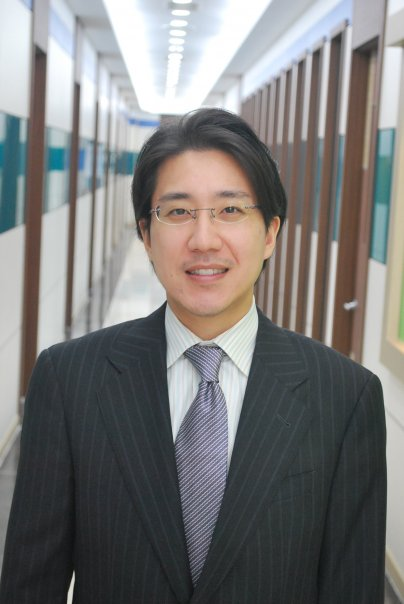
- Kim in 2011

Personal details
- Born: March 6, 1979 (age 47) Baltimore, Maryland, U.S.
- Party: Democratic
- Education: Harvard University (BA)
- Occupation: C2 Education Founder and CEO; Teen Ink Publisher

David Jhoon Kim (born March 6, 1979) is the former CEO and co-founder of C2 Education Centers which he founded in his college dorm room along with Jim Narangajavana. Currently, he is the publisher of Teen Ink. He previously served on the boards of the Atlanta Zoo, Maryland Consumer Protection Board, the Washington Youth Foundation, and commissioner on the Montgomery County Commission on Children and Youth from 2003 to 2005.

On June 7, 2017, David announced that he would be challenging Republican incumbent Rob Woodall to represent Georgia's 7th Congressional District in the 2018. He placed second in the democratic primary with 25.98% of the vote, and also placed second in the runoff election with 48.18% of the vote.

== Personal life ==
David Jhoon Kim was born and raised in Lutherville, Maryland. He enrolled at the Gilman School at the age of 12 and graduated as its valedictorian. He went to Harvard University and earned a B.A. in Economics. During his freshman year, he met Jim Narangajavana. His father is Tae Kwon Do Master Jae Kim, who along with Master Jhoon Rhee helped popularize Tae Kwon Do in the United States in the 70s and 80s.

David relocated both his family and C2 Education headquarters to Duluth, Georgia in 2005 where he currently resides with wife M.J., daughter Jacqueline, and son Henry.

== Education ==
- A.B., 2000, Harvard College
