= Gond Umri railway station =

Railway Station in Maharashtra, India

Gondumri railway station गोंडउमरी रेल्वे स्टेशन

General information
- Location: Gondumri, Bhandara district, Maharashtra; India
- Coordinates: 21.021585°N 80.089708°E
- Elevation: 266 metres (873 ft)
- System: Regular Indian railway station
- Owner: Indian Railways
- Operator: South East Central Railway zone
- Lines: Gondia–Arjuni–Nagbhir–Balharshah line Bilaspur–Nagpur section Howrah–Nagpur–Mumbai line
- Platforms: 1
- Tracks: Broad gauge 1,676 mm (5 ft 6 in)

Construction
- Structure type: At ground
- Parking: Available
- Cycle facilities: Available

Other information
- Status: Functioning
- Station code: GMI
- Zone(s): South East Central Railway zone
- Division(s): Nagpur SEC

Passengers
- 900

Services
Preceding station	Indian Railways	Following station
Sondad towards ?	South East Central Railway zone Gondia–Nagbhir–Ballarshah branch line on Bilaspur–Nagpur section of Howrah–Nagpur–Mumbai line	Dewalgaon towards ?
Location
- Location within India Location within Maharashtra

Gond Umri railway station serves Gondumri and surrounding villages in Bhandara District in Maharashtra, India.
