= Francys Johnson =

American lawyer (born 1979)

Personal details
- Born: June 10, 1979 (age 47) Sylvania, Georgia, U.S.
- Party: Democratic
- Education: Georgia Southern University (BA); University of Georgia (JD)

Francys Johnson (born June 10, 1979) is an American civil rights attorney, pastor and educator. He is in private practice as an attorney in Statesboro, Georgia. He has lectured on constitutional and criminal law, civil rights and race and politics at Savannah State University and Georgia Southern University.

Long active in the NAACP in Georgia, in 2006 he was appointed as Southeast Region Director of the National Association for the Advancement of Colored People (NAACP). After the national organization restructured and closed the regional offices, he served as executive director of the Georgia State Conference of the NAACP. On October 5, 2013, he was described as the civil rights organization's youngest President at the 71st Civil Rights Convention in Columbus, Georgia. Johnson is the Convener of Moral Monday Georgia Movement, a multi-issue, multiracial, nonpartisan coalition of organizations aimed at restoring positive morality to public discourse, policy, and politics.

== Early life and education ==
Johnson was born in Sylvania, Georgia, where he attended public schools. Johnson earned an undergraduate degree from Georgia Southern University, a J.D. degree from the University of Georgia School of Law, and a post-doctoral certification in dispute resolution and mediation from the University of Wisconsin at Madison. He was elected to membership in the Pi Sigma Alpha Political Science Honor Society. He is a member of Alpha Phi Alpha fraternity.

== Academic and legal career ==
Johnson served on the faculty of Savannah State University and Georgia Southern University. Professor Johnson has lectured on American Government, Race and the Law, Constitutional and Criminal law.

In March 2005, he chaired an annual conference roundtable discussion at the National Council for Black Studies. Educators from Dillard University, the Algebra Project, and the University of New Orleans discussed "Quality Education as Civil Rights." Johnson is a Partner with Davis Bozeman Johnson Law with offices in Decatur, Savannah, and Statesboro, Georgia. He practices criminal and civil law in all State and Federal Courts in Georgia.

== Civil rights ==
Johnson first became active in the NAACP with community organization activities in Bulloch County, Georgia.

He later served as Legal Redress Director for the Georgia State Conference of the NAACP. During his tenure, the Georgia State Conference NAACP fought successfully in alliance with the American Civil Liberties Union (ACLU) during the 2006 midterm elections to gain a federal court injunction that prevented voter identification legislation from being implemented. The legislation would have required voters without a driver's license to pay to get a new digital picture identification card. Prior to the legislation, 17 types of identification, such as copies of utility bills and other documents without picture identification, were acceptable. Opponents of the legislation argued that it was a violation of the Voting Rights Act and expressed concern that it might have the effect of reducing minority voter participation. Proponents of the legislation argued that the legislation was an attempt to reduce voter fraud. In the 2004 election, as many as 150,000 Georgians used alternative identification to vote.

In 2006, Johnson was appointed as the NAACP Southeast Region Director, a region representing over 60% of the membership of the organization. As regional director, Johnson worked to strengthen the NAACP's legal and political influence in the deep South through the establishment of "Citizen Review Boards". The boards were intended to address incidents of alleged police brutality in Georgia, Tennessee and Florida, to monitor the application of desegregation orders in Georgia, Florida, Mississippi and Alabama, and to mobilize local and regional support for affirmative action.

On behalf of the NAACP Southeast Region, Johnson opposed a bill to establish April as Confederate History and Heritage Month, arguing that the state had never apologized for slavery. The bill passed, in committee, with a unanimous vote. In his opposition to the bill, Johnson stated, "You can't honor the past and not take responsibility for it." Johnson also lobbied to reform Georgia's criminal code, so that its application did not produce racial disparities. One such effort helped overturn the aggravated child molestation conviction of Genarlow Wilson. Genarlow Wilson was 17 years old when he had a sexual encounter with a 15-year-old female. Wilson was convicted of felony aggravated child molestation. He spent two years behind bars before Georgia changed its law regarding teenage sex. Wilson was initially ordered released. However, the order was stayed after a challenge from the state attorney general. Numerous civil rights groups argued for Wilson's release. Johnson, on behalf of the NAACP said: "[We are] convinced that justice has taken a summer vacation in Georgia.". Ultimately, the Georgia Supreme Court ordered Generlow Wilson released.

After the president and CEO Bruce S. Gordon resigned, the NAACP announced on June 1, 2007, it would restructure, closing the regional offices to emphasize roles of the state conferences. Johnson was appointed as executive director of the Georgia State Conference.

On October 5, 2013, at the 71st annual NAACP Georgia State Convention and Civil Rights Conference in Columbus, Johnson was designated as the organization's next president. He becomes the group's first new president in eight years and the youngest in its history. Johnson succeeded outgoing state President Edward Dubose.

"Folks sometimes are confused about the NAACP; they think the NAACP deals only in black and white issues. That is certainly not the case. We deal in red, white and blue issues - American issues" Johnson said. "Our real work is to make sure that the Constitution and laws of these United States are equitably applied to every citizen - to make real the promise of America's democracy. The issues that I'm focused on are issues that all Georgians should be concerned about."

In a news release issued by the NAACP, Leon Russell, the vice chairman of the organization's board of directors, said: "You can't look at young folks and say you're going to be the leaders of the future. You have to give them the opportunity to lead now, and that's what the NAACP believes. (Johnson) walks in the footsteps of the greats, including Savannah's Ralph Mark Gilbert and W.W. Law; Macon's Julius Caesar Hope; and Madison's Walter Curtis Butler. As a scholar, a practitioner of law, and a dynamic young leader, I am confident that the bar of excellence will be raised and more young professionals will be attracted to the work of the NAACP."

As president, Johnson worked across partisan lines on criminal justice reform including sentencing, probation and parole, and banning the box in state employment. At the same time, he sparred with Republican Nathan Deal over a lack of diversity in judicial picks for Georgia's courts and the State's failure to expand medicaid. He was leading critic of Georgia's failed charter school amendment to the State Constitution that many believed would have turned public schools over to for-profit corporations. He co-convened Georgia's Moral Monday Movement, a group launched after William Barber's state-based movement in North Carolina, with Tim Franzen, American Friends Service Committee, State Senator Vincent Fort and Rev. Dr. Raphael Warnock, Senior Pastor of Ebeneezer Baptist Church. The group launched teach-ins, public demonstrations and led more than 72 clergy and other citizens in acts of civil disobedience to dramatize a swath of what many believed was a right-winged ALEC inspired agenda that included the state's failure to expand medicaid, draconian drug laws, discriminatory stances toward the GBLTQ community and "Stand Your Ground" legislation.

Johnson stepped down from his post on July 23, 2017, and was immediately rumored as a possible challenger to Congressman Rick Allen (R-Augusta) in the 2018 midterms eventually deciding to run for the seat. He won the Democratic nomination but lost to Allen in the general election. During Johnson's tenure the Georgia NAACP filed 10 federal and state lawsuits addressing redistricting and voting rights. Johnson is credited with restoring the voting rights litigation prowess of NAACP in Georgia while attracting younger professionals and bridging the gaps in Georgia between millennial activists groups such as Black Lives Matter.

"Francys Johnson lent his talent, time and treasure to the Association at a critical time. I don't think we've seen the last of his leadership," said Derrick Johnson, newly appointed interim president and CEO.

"He was as comfortable leading the powerful demonstrations across Georgia in response to police-involved deaths of citizens and the Atlanta March for Women and Social Justice, the largest protest march in Georgia history at 63,000 protesters, as he was giving an argument in court or sermon in the pulpit," said the Rev. Raphael Warnock of Ebenezer Baptist Church. "That takes a rare combination of talents."

Johnson was named to succeed Stacey Abrams and Raphael Warnock as head of the New Georgia Project, a transformational civic engagement organization responsible for defeating voter suppression and advancing progressive values in the public policy.

== Religious leader ==
Johnson became an ordained minister in the Baptist Church in the late 1990s. He is the ninth pastor of Mount Moriah Baptist Church in Pembroke, Georgia and the thirteenth pastor Magnolia Missionary Baptist Church of Statesboro, Georgia. Before becoming director of the Southeast Region of the NAACP, he had been named an "Emerging Leader" by the National Religious Leadership Summit.

== Marriage and family ==
Johnson married Meca Renee Williams, Ph.D. They have three sons together, Thurgood Joshua Johnson, Langston Hughes Elijah Johnson, and Frederick Douglass Caleb Johnson.

== Legacy and honors ==
Johnson was inducted into the John F. Nolen Jr. Hall of Leaders for Excellence in Service & Leadership at Georgia Southern University. Johnson was employed by the American Heart and Stroke Association as the vice president of Cultural Health Initiatives. While there, Johnson worked to develop strategies to overcome racial, ethnic and gender health disparities and to strengthen diversity within the organization's operations.

Johnson has lectured and written on the subject of race, measuring equity, and understanding the power of public policy. He has served on the Political Science and Criminal Justice faculties at Georgia Southern University and Savannah State University.
