= Burruss Correctional Training Center =

American medium-security prison in Georgia

Coordinates: 33.03256°N 83.92379°W

- Interactive map of Burruss Correctional Training Center
- Location: 1000 Indian Springs Drive Forsyth, Georgia
- Status: open
- Security class: medium
- Capacity: 806
- Opened: 1986
- Managed by: Georgia Department of Corrections
- Website: gdc.georgia.gov/burruss-correctional-training-ctr

The Burruss Correctional Training Center is a medium security level prison located in Forsyth, Georgia in Monroe County.

It opened in 1986, and consists of four buildings. The prison provides work and rehabilitation programs for general population inmates. The facility houses adult male felons and juveniles.

It is named after Al Burruss.

== Notable inmates ==
- Genarlow Wilson (2005-2007)
