= Giant magnetoimpedance =

In materials science Giant Magnetoimpedance (GMI) is the effect that occurs in some materials where an external magnetic field causes a large variation in the electrical impedance of the material. It should not be confused with the separate physical phenomenon of Giant Magnetoresistance.

== The phenomenology of the GMI ==
GMI is caused by the penetration length that is a measure of how deep an ac electrical current can flow inside an electrical conductor. The penetration length (also known as the skin-depth effect) increases with the square root of the electrical resistivity of the material and is inversely proportional to the square root of the product of the magnetic permeability and the frequency of the ac electrical current. Thus, in materials with very high values of magnetic permeability, such as soft-ferromagnetic materials, the penetration-length can be much less than the thickness of the conductor even for moderate values of frequencies driving the current near the surface of the material.

When an external magnetic field is applied, the size of the permeability diminishes, increasing the penetration of the current in the magnetic material. Large variations are observed in both in-phase and out-of-phase components of the magnetoimpedance for applied magnetic fields close to the value of the Earth magnetic field up to few tens of Oersted. For comparison, in normal electrical conductors the effect of the skin-depth becomes important for frequencies in the microwave range only.

Despite the fact that the dependence of the GMI on the geometry of the electrical conductor (ribbons, wires, multilayers meander-likes) and external parameters is somewhat complex, there are theoretical models that allow calculation of the GMI to within some approximations. Beside the dependence of the GMI on the frequency of the current there are other sources that contribute to the frequency dependence of the GMI, such as the motion of the domain wall and the ferromagnetic resonance.

== Experimental measurement ==
A typical experimental set-up for investigating the GMI in research laboratories is shown below. It includes an alternating current source, a phase sensitive amplifier for detecting the ac voltage across the sample and an electromagnet for applying a dc magnetic field. A cryostat or an oven may be required for measuring the temperature dependence of the GMI.

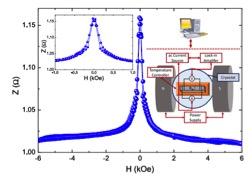
Typical experimental set-up for measuring the GMI (inset) and GMI data for a FeZr alloy at 150 K (From ref. 4).

Several experimental measurements were also performed to characterize the long-term stability and the thermal drift of the GMI, which were supported by a theoretical model describing the physical modeling of the sensing element.

== History ==
The observation that the impedance of soft-magnetic materials is influenced by the frequency and amplitudes of applied magnetic fields was first observed in the 1930s. These initial studies were limited to frequencies of a few hundreds of Hz and the changes of impedance reported in those works were not large. Starting in the 1990s, this phenomenon was investigated again, this time making use of currents with frequencies of hundreds of kHz.

Because of the huge variations observed in the magnetic field dependence of the magnetoimpedance it was named giant magnetoimpedance. Due to the high sensitivity of the sensors using the GMI effect, they have been used in compasses, accelerometers, virus detection, biomagnetism, among other applications.

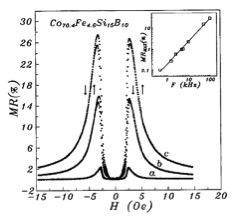
In-phase component of the GMI measured for a piece of an amorphous ferromagnetic material (From ref. 7)
