= GMInsideNews =

GM Inside News
- Website type: General Motors Fansite
- Owner: AutoForums.com
- Website: http://www.gminsidenews.com/
- Registration: Optional (Required to post)
- Launched: 2001
- Current status: Active

GM Inside News (abbreviated GMI) is an Internet Forum focused on General Motors, its brands and products.

While "inside" news is rare on this site, when GMI does get a "scoop" bigger and more established, publications have been known to use the popular site as a source. Recently, GMI has shown information from all car makers, not just General Motors.

As of October 2023, GM Inside News has over 82,500+ members and 3.5 million posts.

== History ==
=== 2008 - present: Autoforums era ===
In March 2008, GMI was transferred to the ownership of AutoForums.com and given another major redesign.

In January 2009, GMI was given a slight update to the forums and started becoming more of a global site.

In July 2009, GMI was updated again. The update added a new "Premium Membership" option, through which a user can pay to help support the site in exchange for a badge under their username and some extra forum features.
