= David Kwangshin Kim =

Korean Protestant Christian pastor (born 1935)

David Kwang-shin Kim
- 김광신
- Born: January 2, 1935; South Korea
- Died: May 25, 2022 (aged 87)
- Occupation: Pastor

David Kwang-shin Kim (Korean: 김광신; January 2, 1935 – May 25, 2022) was a South Korean Protestant Christian pastor.

== Overview ==
Kim was the founder and pastor of Grace Korean Church and the president of Grace Ministries International (GMI). He was also the principal pastor of Seoul Grace Church. He was the president of Grace Mission University for 4 years.

== Life and career ==
=== Ministry ===
Kim said he was an atheist until he was aged 42, when his brother-in-law told him that he had been miraculously cured of throat cancer. After listening to this story. Kim said he decided that his reasons for denying God were groundless and he prayed for direction. He said he felt "born again" the next morning. He said that 4 months later he experienced "speaking in tongues".

He left his business and entered the Talbot School of Theology. He led Bible studies as an elder and theology student.

In 1982, he founded Grace Korean Church with only three families.

In 2000, he launched Grace Ministries International, a missions' organization.

The mission of Grace Korean Church is to obey the Great Commission. It has set aside more than half of its budget for international mission work.

Kim came to Seoul Grace Church in 2004 and the first Sunday service was held on November 28, 2004 at Gangdong-gu.

== Mission ==
=== Church Planting ===
Through Grace Ministries International, churches have been planted all over the world - 2,000 in Russia, 600 in Africa, 3,000 in China, 1,000 in Vietnam, and many more in South America. GMI sent more than 250 missionaries to about 50 countries.

=== Glow of Love Program ===
Also known as Tres Dias, this three day program offers training in ten locations around the world, including France, Germany, Spain, Russia and its surrounding countries, South Korea, Japan, Taiwan, and Africa.

=== G12 Program ===
Grace Korean Church has a special program called “Basket Operation” that is composed of 13 successive steps.

== Grace Mission University ==
Grace Mission University was founded in Los Angeles, US in 1996. It was founded through Grace Korean Church and its mission was to train up and send 2,000 missionaries all over the world.

Kim was president of the university from 1998 to 2000 and from 2000 to 2002.
