= Old Ocean, Texas =

- Unincorporated community
- Location within the state of Texas Old Ocean (the United States)
- Coordinates: 29°4′47″N 95°44′58″W
- Country: United States
- State: Texas
- County: Brazoria

Population (2010)
  - Total: 150
- Time zone: UTC-6 (Central (CST))
  - Summer (DST): UTC-5 (CDT)
- ZIP codes: 77463

Old Ocean is an unincorporated community in Brazoria County, Texas, United States. According to the Handbook of Texas, the community had a population of 915 in 2000. It is located within the Greater Houston metropolitan area.

== Geography ==
Old Ocean is located at the intersection of Farm to Market Road 524 and Texas State Highway 35, 5 mi (8.0 km) northwest of Sweeny. It is also located 7 mi (11 km) west of West Columbia and 22 mi (35 km) west of Angleton.

== Demographics ==
As of the census of 2000, there were 150 people in the community.

== History ==
Old Ocean was originally known as Chance's Prairie, after the land grant made to Joseph H. Polley and Samuel Chance on July 27, 1824. William B. Sweeny, one of the founders of Chance's Prairie and for which the local town of Sweeny was named, bought 2,319 acres (9.38 km^{2}) from Polley and Chance for $1,950. He had arrived in the county in 1832. His family and their 250 slaves arrived here and settled on a league of land donated by Charles Breen, on the southern boundary of this grant. John Sweeny, Sr.'s six children eventually owned more local plantations after he died in 1854. Eventually, more people settled here, and the town reportedly had a population of 18 in 1880. James Abercrombie discovered oil nearby in 1934, and a government oil refinery was constructed to make high-octane gas. It was closed near the end of World War II. The oilfield was called Old Ocean, and by 1936 the town eventually took that name. A post office with the name Old Ocean was established in 1945 and was located inside a commissary on Sweeny's plantation. The 1936 county highway map showed Bethlehem church, several other buildings, and several scattered houses in the area. Its population was 800 in 1945 and had four businesses two years later. Its population grew to over a thousand residents and had nine businesses in 1964, losing 100 residents and only one business in 1972. Its population was recorded as 915 from the 1970s through 2000. It had two churches in 1974. Its business directory included 19 businesses in 1982, eight a decade later, and 21 in 2000.

Some settlers of the community included Mills M. Battle, M. Berry, Thomas H. Borden, Charles Breen, Benjamin C. Franklin, Freeman George, Henry W. Johnson, Oliver Jones, Imla Keep, David McCormick, Zeno Philips, Thomas Walker, John Williams, and Robert Harris Williams. Before the American Civil War, Sampson Brown was brought here as a slave from Maryland by Joseph McCormick in 1837. He then became a teacher and a preacher in Milam and Fort Bend counties after he was emancipated. Prince Monroe managed McCormick's plantation for more than 20 years.

== Present-day Old Ocean ==
Little remains of Old Ocean besides the post office. The Baptist church and other buildings were demolished. The town is currently being redeveloped into an industrial facility and both State Highway 35 and FM 524 have been bypassed around the townsite.

Although Old Ocean is unincorporated, it has a post office, with the ZIP Code 77463.

As of 2024, the Post Office no longer remains. Several RV parks that serve the local plant are all the remains of Old Ocean.

== Education ==
Around 1906, Old Ocean had four schools for Black students that had a combined total of 199 students enrolled and four teachers employed. There was only one school in 1936. Today, Old Ocean is served by the Sweeny Independent School District.
