= Jim Lindsey (Canadian football) =

American football player (1948–1998)

- Lindsey, November 1970, from Sports Illustrated

No. 12, 5
- Position: Quarterback

Personal information
- Born: November 16, 1948; Bay City, Texas, U.S.
- Died: September 9, 1998 (aged 49); Colleyville, Texas, U.S.
- Listed height: 5 ft 11 in (1.80 m)
- Listed weight: 185 lb (84 kg)

Career information
- High school: Sweeny (Sweeny, Texas)
- College: Abilene Christian

Career history
- 1971–1973: Calgary Stampeders
- 1974: Toronto Argonauts

Awards and highlights
- Grey Cup champion (1971); First-team Little All-American (1970); NCAA career record passing yards (1970); Southland Conference Player of the Decade (1960s)

James Ellis Lindsey (November 16, 1948 – September 9, 1998) was an American professional football player who was a quarterback in the Canadian Football League (CFL). He played college football for the Abilene Christian Wildcats, breaking the NCAA career records for both passing yards and total offense. He later played in the CFL from 1971 to 1974 and helped lead the 1971 Calgary Stampeders to the Grey Cup championship.

== Early life ==
Lindsey was born in 1948 in Bay City, Texas. He played high school football in Sweeny, Texas. As a senior in 1966, he led Sweeny High School's football team to the Class AA Texas state championship.

== College career ==
Lindsey attended Abilene Christian College in Abilene, Texas. After serving as a backup as a freshman in 1967, he was the starting quarterback for the Abilene Christian Wildcats from 1968 to 1970. During his three years as the starting quarterback, he led the teams to a 21-9-1 record. A prolific passer, he set 19 Southland Conference records and broke the NCAA career record with 8,521 passing yards. He also became the nation's all-time leader in total offense. He was the Southland Conference Offensive Player of the Year in both 1969 and 1970 and was selected as the first-team quarterback on the 1970 Little All-America college football team.

== Professional career ==
Lindsey also played professional football in the Canadian Football League (CFL) for the Calgary Stampeders (1971–1973) and Toronto Argonauts (1974). As a rookie, he served as the backup to Jerry Keeling, passing for 1,055 yards and eight touchdowns to help lead the 1971 Calgary team to a Grey Cup championship team. During his CFL career, he appeared in 59 games, passed for 3,178 yards and 17 touchdowns with 47 interceptions and 10 fumbles. He also rushed for 430 yards and four touchdowns.

== Later life and honors ==
Lindsey and his wife, Susan, had three daughters. In later years, Lindsey operated an insurance company called Jim Lindsey & Associates Insurance Company. He died of heart failure in Colleyville, Texas in 1998 at age 49.

Lindsey was inducted into Abilene Christian's Hall of Fame in 1987. His jersey No. 10 was retired by Abilene Christian in 2006. His was only the second football jersey to be retired by the school, the first being No. 28 worn by Wilbert Montgomery.

In 2013, as part of the Southland Conference's fiftieth anniversary celebration, the conference picked an all-decade team for the 1960s, and Lindsey was chosen as the Player of the Decade for the 1960s.
