= Sweeny Independent School District =

School district in Texas, United States

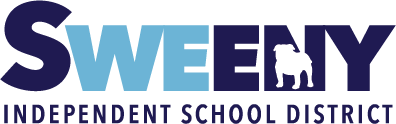

Address
- 1310 N Elm St, Sweeny, TX 77480 Brazoria County, Texas; United States

District information
- Motto: Providing the Educational Advantage Since 1912, Academic Achievement.
- Grades: K-12
- Established: 1912
- Superintendent: Daniel Fuller
- School board: Bryan Douget, President (Position 6), Donna Bohlar-Schroeder, Vice President (Position 2), Debra Fields-Bell, Secretary (Position 4), Paul Kibodeaux (Position 3), Brittanie Hopkins (Position 1), Trina Smith (Position 2)
- Chair of the board: Bryan Douget
- Governing agency: Sweeny ISD Board of Trustees
- Schools: Sweeny High School, Sweeny Junior High School, Sweeny Elementary School (3)
- NCES District ID: 4841970

Students and staff
- Students: 1,933 (2023–2024)
- Teachers: 138.58 (on an FTE basis)
- Student–teacher ratio: 13.95:1
- Athletic conference: 4A, UIL
- District mascot: Bulldog
- Colors: Blue and White

Other information
- Website: www.sweenyisd.org

Sweeny Independent School District is a public school district based in Sweeny, Texas, United States. The district is approximately 177.3 square miles (459 km^{2}) and serves the City of Sweeny and surrounding area. The mascot of the high school is the Bulldog, and the mascot of the junior high is the Friskie. In 2009, the school district was rated "academically acceptable" by the Texas Education Agency.

== History ==
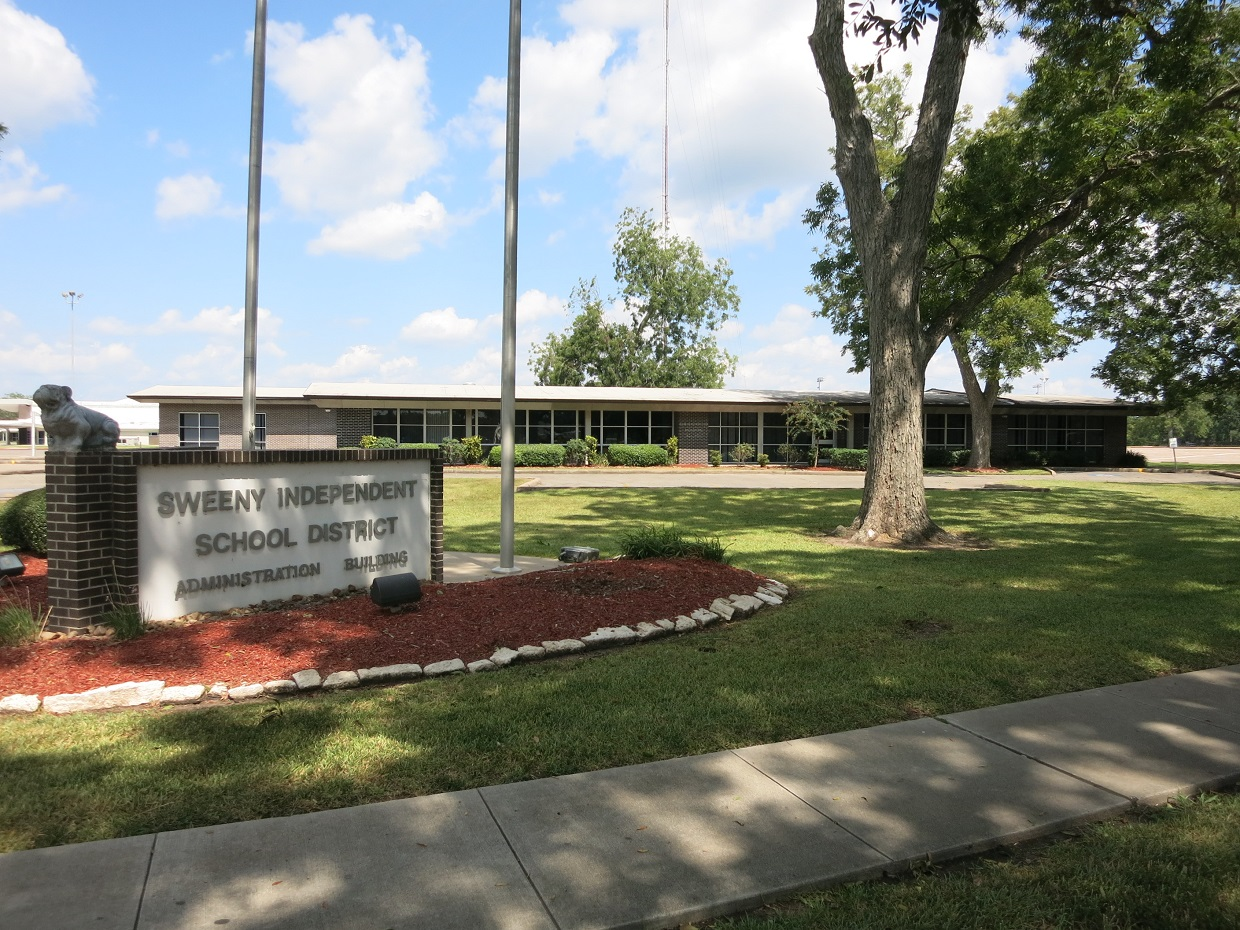
Sweeny ISD Administration Building

In 1896 Brazoria County went to a Common School District system. There was a total of 22 districts at that time. Two of those districts, 17 and 19, were west of the San Bernard River with the dividing line between the two approximately ½ mile north of what we know today to be FM 521. This put the area that would later become the Sweeny/Old Ocean area in District 17.

In 1910-1911 R D McDonald and Burton Hurd plotted the townsite and began selling property and developing Sweeny. Area community members led by Emmitt Rimmer petitioned the county commissioners court to form District 32 out of the lower half of District 17. The court granted the request and ordered an election be held the next month at the Sweeny Hotel for the purpose of assessing a 15 cents per $100 valuation tax to be used for school purposes. The measure passed. In June 1911 R D McDonald gave to Common School District 32 trustees Sweeny townsite block 21 on Elm street for school purposes. At this time there was already a one-room school building where Miss Mae Rice taught for a while until she could no longer stand the rowdy boys.

In 1912, the Sweeny Civic Club led by Marie Ellis were not content with the lack of schooling within the community. Mrs. Ellis, with Mrs. Nugent's help, traveled by buggy across district 32 seeking petition signatures to hold a bond election for building a brick school building. The petition was presented to county commissioners, approved and a $20,000 bond election was scheduled.

In March 1913 a petition for an election to incorporate Sweeny for school purposes only was submitted to county commissioners and approved. The election was held in April with 31 for 0 against. Thus, the beginning of SISD. As required by Texas legislature this was a small less than 25 square mile district. The northern boundary would have reached about 1 ½ miles south of today's Old Ocean, the southern boundary was the lower line of District 32, the east boundary the Bernard river and the west boundary extended just beyond where today's Ashley Wilson Road crosses the R/R tracks. The only two known schools within these boundaries were the previously mentioned one room school on Elm Street and one at El Bernardo. With this election Emmitt Rimmer, M J Parten, L W Enberg, Dr. M H Eades, F S Rice, Oliver Schadler and E R Clark were elected as SISD trustees. On May 16, 1913, the trustees held their first organization meeting electing Emmitt Rimmer as president and SISD was up and running. The trustees soon approved attaching another room to the current one room building, building a new brick schoolhouse, hiring two temporary teachers Miss Myrtle Hester and Miss Hester Rice for intermediate and primary students and hiring Dr. Wallace as first principal.

== Schools ==
The school district operates three schools.

- Sweeny High School (grades 9–12)
  - George Washington Carver (Segregated school, consolidated with the High School in 1966)
- Sweeny Junior High School (grades 6–8)
- Sweeny Elementary School (grades K-5)
- Sweeny ISD DAEP (Brazoria County JJAEP)
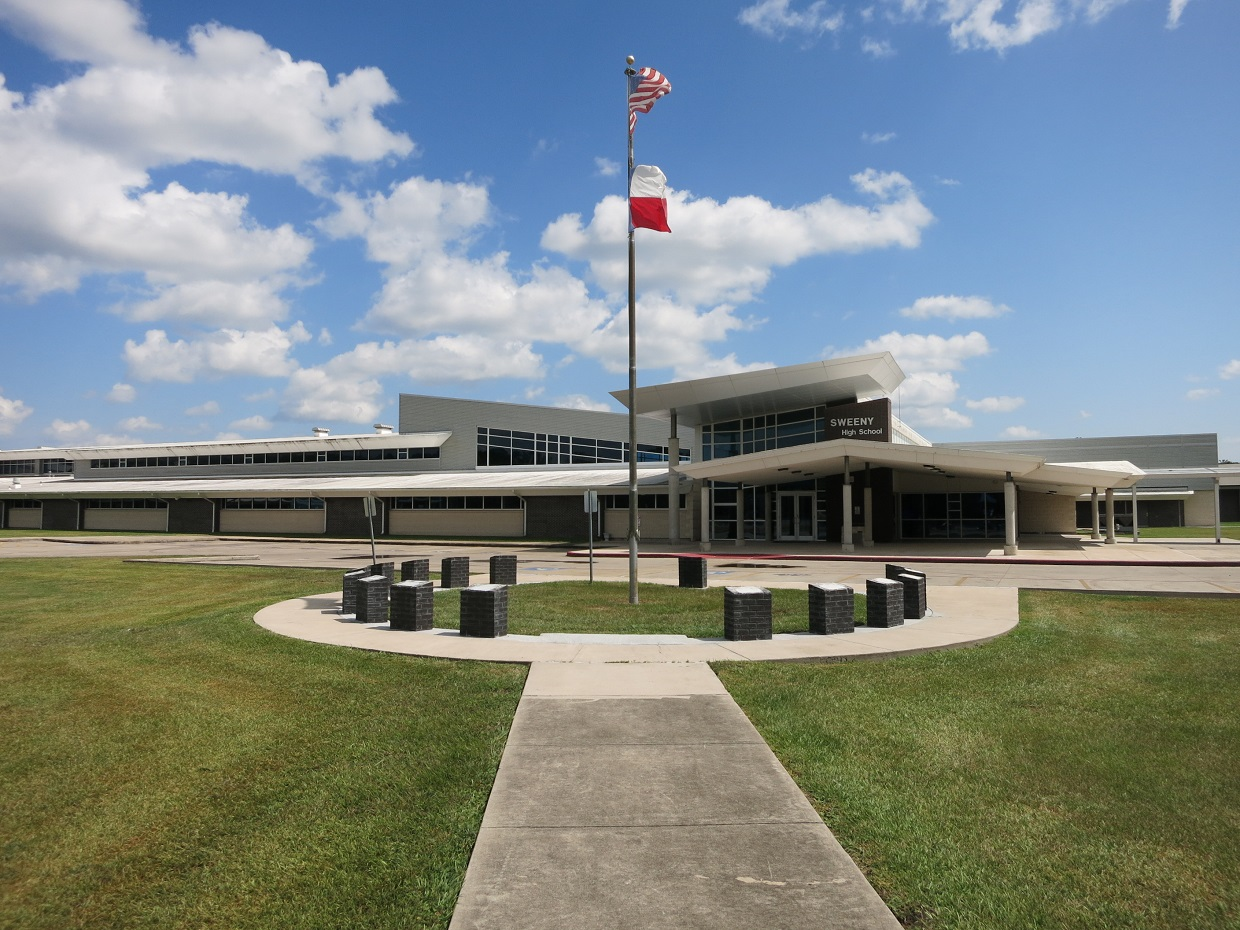
Sweeny High School

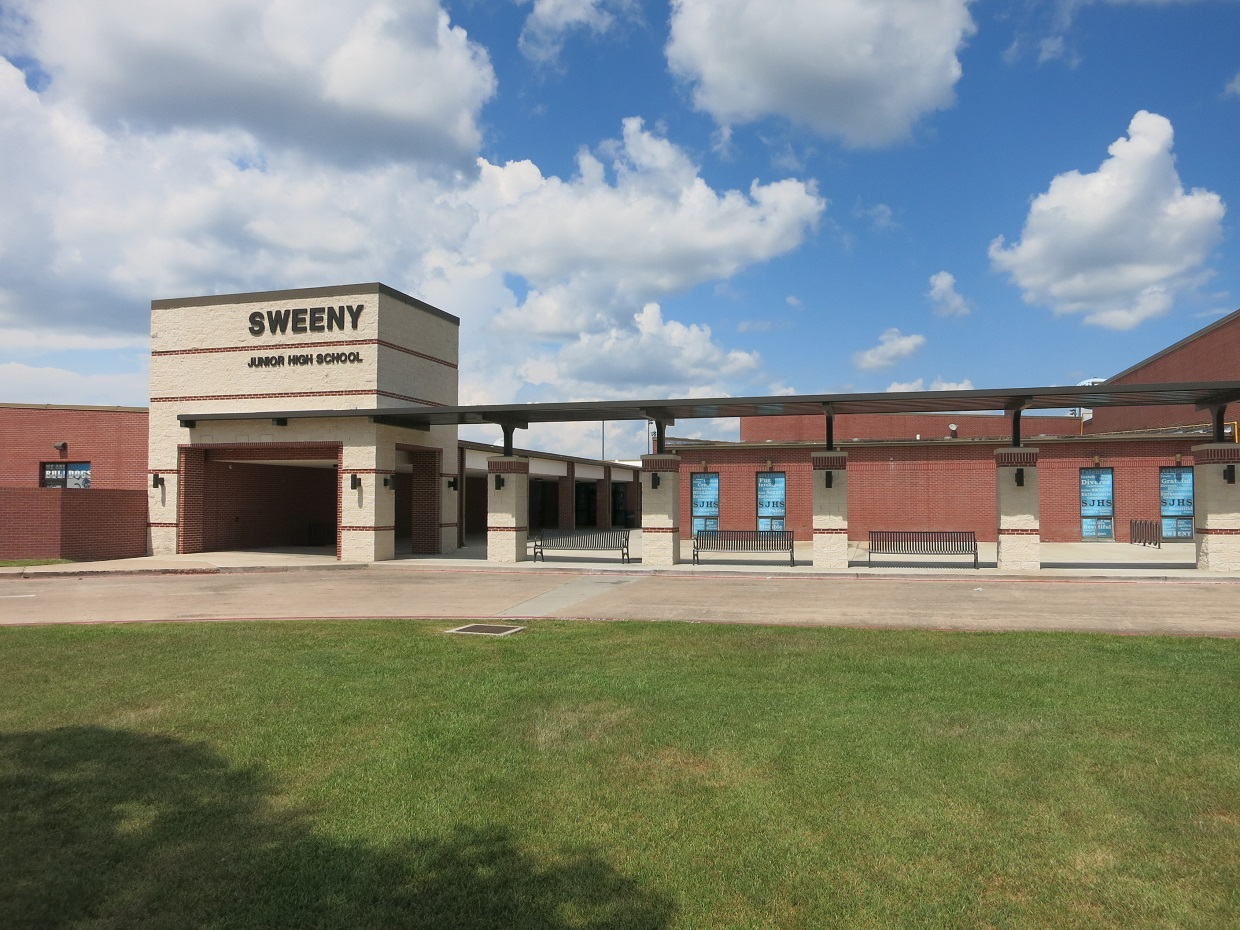
Sweeny Junior High School

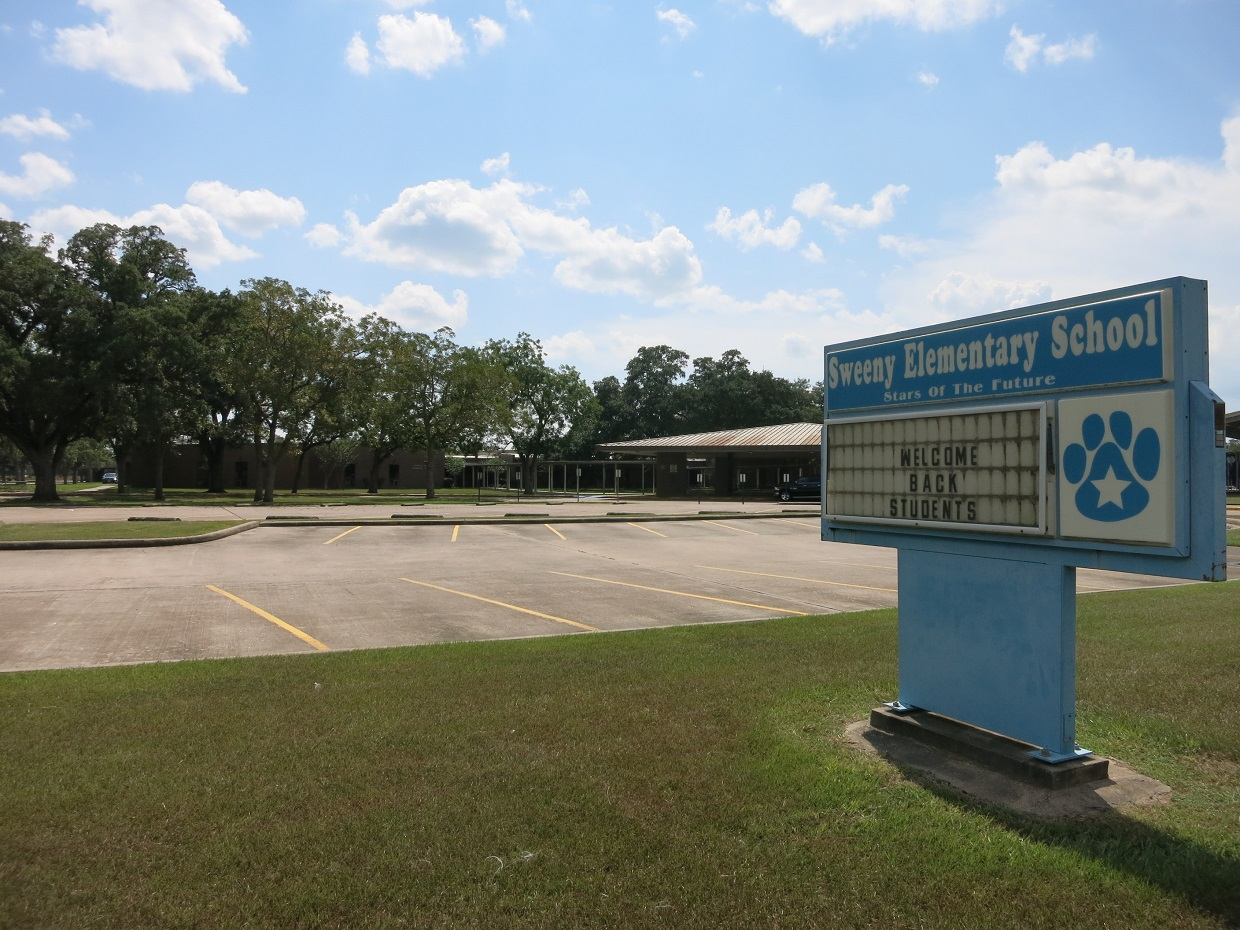
Sweeny Elementary School

== Notable alumni ==
- Tank Carder - former NFL linebacker for the Cleveland Browns
- Johnnie Lee Higgins - former NFL wide receiver

== Sweeny ISD Police Department ==
The Sweeny ISD Police Department is under the leadership of Police Chief Marcus Way, appointed by the Board of Trustees on October 8, 2019. Chief Way is the successor of former Chief of Police John Ideus (Retired) Chief Marcus Way assumed the duties of Police Chief on October 9, 2019. Sweeny ISD Police Department employs two full-time TCOLE commissioned peace officers.

== Extracurricular organizations ==
- HOSA
- FFA
- Theater
- Band
- Belles
- Choir
- UIL Academics
- Sports

== See also ==
- List of school districts in Texas
