= George Washington Carver High School (Sweeny, Texas) =

Location
- Sweeny, Texas; U.S.
- Coordinates: 29.03935°N 95.7048°W

Information
- Former name: Sweeny Negro School (?–1955)
- School type: State school, Black
- Status: Closed
- Closed: 1966

George Washington Carver High School was a public secondary school in Sweeny, Texas. It served as the high school for black students until 1966, when the schools were integrated and the black students attended Sweeny High School. It was founded as the Sweeny Negro School.

== History ==
Originally known as Sweeny Negro School, the school was renamed George Washington Carver High School in 1955. The school won the texas state football championship in 1965. In 1966 the school district integrated the black and white schools. The high school students reassigned to Sweeny High School, and Carver was used for 4th-6th grades. The consolidation of the schools resulted in a reduction of 12 teaching positions. 17 of the 23 black teachers at Carver were involuntarily released, while no white teachers received the same treatment. Nine of the black teachers sued the school district, but the court ruled that the district had acted fairly.

== Notable alumni ==
- Elmo Wright, professional football player, first to perform a touchdown celebration dance
- Sweeny Williams, professional football player, actor
