= Kevin Garrett =

Kevin Garrett may refer to:

- Kevin Garrett (American football)
- Kevin Garrett (musician)

== See also ==
- Kevin Garnett, American basketball player
