= Clarence Williams (defensive end) =

American football player (1946–2017)

No. 83
- Position: Defensive end

Personal information
- Born: September 3, 1946; Brazoria, Texas, U.S.
- Died: May 8, 2017 (aged 70); Cincinnati, Ohio, U.S.
- Listed height: 6 ft 5 in (1.96 m)
- Listed weight: 255 lb (116 kg)

Career information
- High school: George Washington Carver (Sweeny, Texas)
- College: Prairie View A&M (1965-1968)
- NFL draft: 1969: 11th round, 283rd overall pick

Career history
- Dallas Cowboys (1969)*; Las Vegas Cowboys (1969); Green Bay Packers (1970–1977)
- * Offseason or practice squad member only

Career NFL statistics
- Fumble recoveries: 8
- Interceptions: 1
- Touchdowns: 1
- Sacks: 51
- Stats at Pro Football Reference

Clarence Williams (September 3, 1946 – May 8, 2017) was an American professional football defensive end in the National Football League (NFL) for the Dallas Cowboys and Green Bay Packers. He was drafted by the Dallas Cowboys in the 11th round of the 1969 NFL/AFL draft. He played college football at Prairie View A&M University.

== Early life ==
Williams played at a time when high school and colleges were still highly segregated in the South. He attended and played football at George Washington Carver High School (Sweeny, Texas), where he helped his team win the Carver State Championship in 1965.

His play in football and basketball earned him the nickname “Sweeny”. He also practiced the shot put and the discus throw. He accepted a football scholarship from Prairie View A&M University.

In 2015, he was inducted into the Prairie View A&M University Sports Hall Of Fame.

== Professional career ==
=== Dallas Cowboys ===
Williams was selected by the Dallas Cowboys in the eleventh round (283rd overall) of the 1969 NFL/AFL draft as a defensive tackle. On September 9, he was waived but signed to the team's taxi squad, where he spent all of the 1969 season.

He was given playing time in the 1970 preseason, including a game against the Green Bay Packers where he was scouted. He was traded along with Malcolm Walker to the Packers for Herb Adderley on September 1, 1970.

=== Green Bay Packers ===
Williams was looked upon as the replacement for recently retired Willie Davis. In the eighth game of the 1970 season against the Baltimore Colts, Bob Brown was switched from left defensive end to tackle, in order for Williams to move into the starting lineup.

Nicknamed "Big Cat", his best season in the NFL came in 1972, when according to the Packers media he led the team with 10.5 sacks. Three of those sacks came in the NFC Central Division-clinching game against the Minnesota Vikings.

Williams would lead the team again in 1974 with 7 sacks. In 1975, he registered 10 sacks. He was durable and would play in 107 consecutive games at defensive end.

In 1977, he was displaced by rookie Mike Butler and played mostly as a reserve defensive tackle. He was waived on August 16, 1978.

He played for the Packers during a low point in the franchise history (only experiencing one winning season), which cost him the opportunity to earn more accolades for his play. During his time with the team he was known as Sweeny Williams and was also voted as the team's player representative.

== Personal life ==
Williams owned a travel agency. He was married to Icy Williams and has three children, Clarence Jr., Cary and Marla. He was a defensive coach for St. Norbert College for two years. From 1988 to 1981, he was an assistant coach at Southeast Missouri State University.

On May 8, 2017, he died at the age of 70.
