= Len Gotshalk =

American football player (born 1949)

No. 65
- Position: Offensive tackle

Personal information
- Born: October 21, 1949 (age 77); Lakeport, California, U.S.
- Listed height: 6 ft 4 in (1.93 m)
- Listed weight: 259 lb (117 kg)

Career information
- High school: Lakeport
- College: Humboldt State
- NFL draft: 1971: 8th round, 186th overall pick

Career history
- Atlanta Falcons (1971–1976)

Awards and highlights
- Third-team Little All-American (1970)

Career NFL statistics
- Games played: 66
- Games started: 41
- Fumble recoveries: 2
- Stats at Pro Football Reference

Leonard William Gotshalk (born October 21, 1949) is an American former professional football player who was an offensive tackle for the Atlanta Falcons of the National Football League (NFL). He played college football for the Humboldt State Lumberjacks. He received third-team honors on the 1970 Little All-America college football team.
