= Leon McQuay =

American gridiron football player (1950–1995)

No. 24, 27, 25, 31, 23
- Position: Running back

Personal information
- Born: March 19, 1950; Tampa, Florida, U.S.
- Died: November 29, 1995 (aged 45); Tampa, Florida, U.S.
- Listed height: 5 ft 9 in (1.75 m)
- Listed weight: 200 lb (91 kg)

Career information
- High school: Howard W. Blake (FL)
- College: Tampa
- NFL draft: 1973: 5th round, 119th overall pick

Career history
- Toronto Argonauts (1971–1973); Calgary Stampeders (1973); New York Giants (1974); New England Patriots (1975); New Orleans Saints (1976); Toronto Argonauts (1977)

Awards and highlights
- CFL All-Star (1971); CFL East All-Star (1971); First-team Little All-American (1970)

Career NFL statistics
- Rushing yards: 287
- Rushing average: 3.3
- Rushing touchdowns: 1
- Receptions: 9
- Receiving yards: 86
- Stats at Pro Football Reference

Leon McQuay (March 19, 1950 – November 29, 1995) was an American professional football running back who played in the National Football League (NFL) and Canadian Football League (CFL).

== College career ==
McQuay played college football with the now disbanded University of Tampa Spartans (from 1968 to 1970.) He was the second black athlete to receive a scholarship to UT, the first black athlete to receive an athletic scholarship at The University of Tampa was Rudy Bradley, who received a basketball scholarship in 1966. "All the Way" McQuay rushed for 3,039 yards, scored 37 touchdowns. He rushed for 1,362 yards and scored 22 TDs as a junior in 1970 and received first-team honors on the 1970 Little All-America college football team. He was inducted into the University of Tampa Sports Hall of Fame in 1983.

== Professional career ==
McQuay skipped his senior season to sign with the Toronto Argonauts of the Canadian Football League in 1971. Though small, at 5 ft 9 in (1.75 m) and 200 pounds (91 kg), he had lightning speed and was known as "X-ray". He took the CFL by storm, rushing for 977 yards and a 7.1 yard per carry average. He was an all star and runner up for the CFL's Most Outstanding Player Award. Unfortunately, his most famous, or infamous, moment came in the 59th Grey Cup versus the Calgary Stampeders. Toronto fans had waited decades for a champion, and with less than two minutes left, down by 3 points and on the Calgary 7-yard line, quarterback Joe Theismann handed off to McQuay, who promptly slipped on the wet turf and fumbled away the ball, and Toronto lost the game.

The fumble was actually the result of McQuay hitting the turf without being touched. The contact with the ground dislodged the ball causing the fumble. Since he was never touched by the defense he was not down by contact and therefore it was a legal fumble.

He rushed for 745 yards in 1972, but the Argonauts' fortunes faded. Coach Leo Cahill would say "Leon slipped and I fell." In 1973, he saw limited playing time and was traded to the Calgary Stampeders.

McQuay was picked by the New York Giants in the fifth round (119th overall) of the 1973 NFL draft. He would go on to play 13 games for the Giants in 1974, 13 games for the New England Patriots in 1975 and 4 games for the New Orleans Saints in 1976, mostly returning punts and kickoffs. His best year was 1974, when he rushed for 240 yards.

McQuay would return to Toronto for the 1977 season, rushing for 307 yards. He also played for the Jacksonville Firebirds of the American Football Association in 1980 and was drafted by Tampa Bay Bandits of the United States Football League in 1983, but was cut before playing with the team.

After retiring, McQuay returned to his native Florida to study to become a minister, but died unexpectedly of a heart attack in 1995, aged 45.
