= Sweeny High School (Texas) =

Public school in Texas, United States

Location
- 600 East Ashley Wilson Road; Sweeny, Texas 77480-1399; United States; 29.04913°N 95.70427°W

Information
- School type: Public high school
- Locale: Rural
- School district: Sweeny Independent School District
- NCES District ID: 4841970
- Educational authority: Texas Education Agency
- Superintendent: Terri Watkins
- CEEB code: 446840
- NCES School ID: 484197004778
- Principal: Tyler Rowlett
- Teaching staff: 49.87 (on an FTE basis)
- Grades: 9-12
- Gender: Coeducational
- Enrollment: 597 (2024-2025)
  - Grade 9: 161
  - Grade 10: 143
  - Grade 11: 129
  - Grade 12: 164
- Student to teacher ratio: 11.97
- Colors: Columbia blue and white
- Athletics conference: UIL Class 4A
- Mascot: Bulldog
- Website: Sweeny High School website

Sweeny High School is a public high school located in Sweeny, Texas (USA). It is part of the Sweeny Independent School District located in southwest Brazoria County and classified as a 4A school by the UIL. For the 2024-2025 school year, the school was given a "B" by the Texas Education Agency.

== Athletics ==
The Sweeny Bulldogs compete in these sports -

- Baseball
- Basketball
- Cross Country
- Football
- Golf
- Powerlifting
- Soccer
- Softball
- Tennis
- Track and Field
- Volleyball

=== State Titles ===
Sweeny (UIL)

- Baseball -
  - 1985(3A)
- Boys' Basketball -
  - 1954(1A), 1985(3A), 1987(3A), 1988(3A)
- Football -
  - 1966(2A)
- Softball -
  - 1996(3A)
- Boys' Track -
  - 1992(3A)

Sweeny Carver (PVIL)

- Football -
  - 1965(PVIL-1A)

=== State Finalist ===
Sweeny (UIL)

- Girls' Basketball -
  - 1979(3A), 1981(3A), 1982(3A), 1983(3A), 1985(3A), 1987(3A)
- Football -
  - 1983(3A)

Sweeny Carver (PVIL)

- Boys' Basketball -
  - 1965(PVIL-1A)
- Football -
  - 1961(PVIL-1A)
- Baseball - 2018(4A), 2019(4A)

== Notable alumni ==
- Cedric Woodard - NFL Defensive Tackle for the Seattle Seahawks.
- Elmo Wright, NFL Wide Receiver, first to perform a touchdown celebration dance.
- Tracy Simien - NFL Linebacker mainly for the Kansas City Chiefs.
- Jim Lindsey, CFL Quarterback.
- Johnnie Lee Higgins - NFL Wide Receiver for the Oakland Raiders.
- Kevin Garrett - NFL & CFL Cornerback.
- Tank Carder - NFL Linebacker for the Cleveland Browns.
