= Joe Profit =

American football player (born 1949)

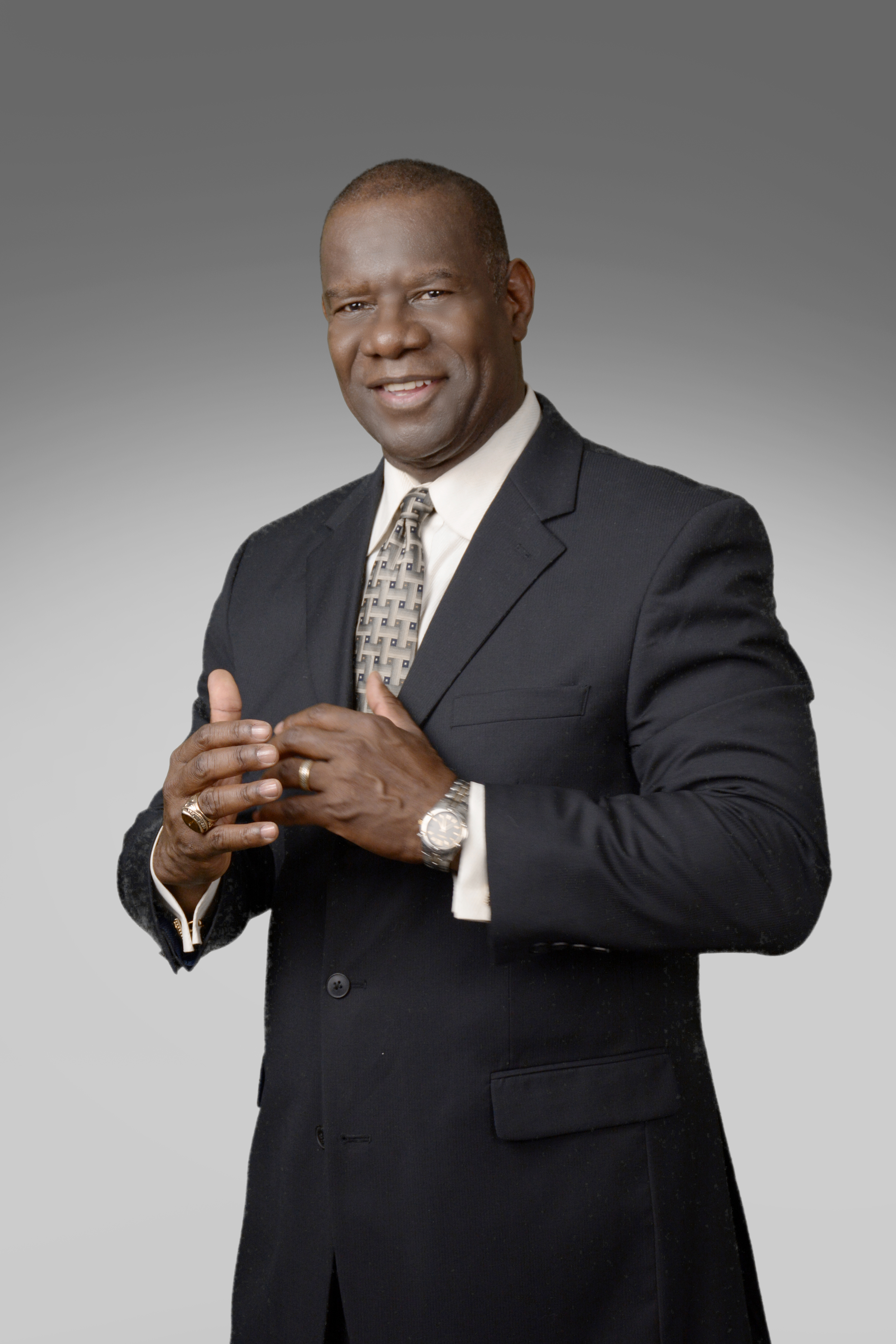

Personal details
- Born: August 13, 1949 (age 77) Lake Providence, Louisiana, U.S.
- Party: Republican
- Education: University of Louisiana, Monroe (BA)
- Football career

No. 23
- Position: Running back

Personal information
- Listed height: 6 ft 0 in (1.83 m)
- Listed weight: 213 lb (97 kg)

Career information
- High school: Richwood (Ouachita Parish, Louisiana)
- College: Northeast Louisiana
- NFL draft: 1971: 1st round, 7th overall pick

Career history
- Atlanta Falcons (1971–1973); New Orleans Saints (1973); Birmingham Americans (1974)

Awards and highlights
- First-team Little All-American (1970)

Career NFL statistics
- Rushing yards: 471
- Rushing touchdowns: 3
- Receptions: 14
- Receiving yards: 130
- Stats at Pro Football Reference

Joe Profit (born August 13, 1949) is an American former professional football player who was a running back for the Atlanta Falcons in the National Football League (NFL). He spent two seasons, plus part of a third, on the Atlanta Falcons before moving to the New Orleans Saints. He was selected in the first round with the seventh overall pick in the 1971 NFL draft. In his three seasons in the NFL, he rushed 133 times for 471 yards and three touchdowns. He spent the 1974 season with the Birmingham Americans and 1975 with the Birmingham Vulcans, both of the World Football League. He played college football at Northeast Louisiana University. Profit ran as a Republican in 2018 for Congress in Georgia's 4th congressional district, losing to incumbent Democrat Hank Johnson.

== Early life and college career ==
Joseph Profit was one of nine children born to Simon and Ethel Profit in one of the poorest areas in America, Lake Providence, Louisiana. He graduated from Richwood High School in Monroe, Louisiana, and afterwards briefly attended Alcorn State before transferring to the University of Louisiana, Monroe.

Profit “only played three (football) games as a high school senior.” In those three games he managed to score seven touchdowns. With such success, he received scholarship offers from various schools, including Grambling, Southern and Alcorn. Profit chose Alcorn State. However, due to various reasons, Profit left Alcorn with his sights on the University of Louisiana-Monroe (ULM).

While attending ULM, Profit “became the first black athlete to play football in the Gulf States Conference” (now the Sunbelt Conference). He was the Conference's all-time rushing champion with 2,818 yards, 538 carries and he set 10 school records, including most yards in a game. Unanimously, he was chosen as a member of the All–Sunbelt Conference team three years in a row. He also received first-team honors on the 1970 Little All-America college football team. He was, also, named Most Outstanding Running Back in the Senior Bowl and was invited to play in the North–South Shrine Game. According to Atlanta's Journal Sports Writer, Van Scott, during Profit's collegiate career, he scored 19 rushing touchdowns and, at one time, placed 27th in the NCAA College Division rushing statistics. Profit was the first athlete to have his number retired in the school's history.

== Career ==
=== NFL ===
Profit was selected seventh overall in the first round of the 1971 NFL draft by the Atlanta Falcons. He was the first running back in Atlanta Falcons’ history to ever rush for 169 yards on 21 carries and two touchdowns in a single game. NFL Hall of Famer, Norm Van Brocklin, said “Joe was the best running back in the United States of America.” At the time, Profit was the single longest hold out in contract negotiations in Falcons history and the first running back to receive a multi-year six figure contract. After two years with the Falcons, Profit was traded to the New Orleans Saints. In 1974, he signed with the Birmingham Americans in the World Football League (WFL), and he signed with the Birmingham Vulcans of the WFL in 1975.

=== Business career ===
As a businessman, Profit was the first African-American to purchase an International House of Pancakes (IHOP) franchise in Georgia. After selling it, he bought several Burger King Restaurants.

In addition, Profit is founder and CEO of Communications International Inc., a telecommunications company. (CII). In 1991, CII was the first minority-owned firm to secure a multimillion-dollar contract to help in the reconstruction of the war-damaged country of Kuwait. Profit serves as president and CEO of Multimedia Digital Broadcast Corporation (MDBC). Founded in 2007, MDBC is a technology and marketing company that provides entertainment and information through a digital media delivery platform. The company specializes in a Proprietary Internet Protocol Television (IPTV) and broadband technologies. It, also, provides marketing, branding, advertising, strategic services and digital broadband content delivery services.

Profit is the author of “Fields of Success - Raised Expectations.” It is a biography written to inspire others, especially our youths.

For the past ten years, Profit has dedicated a great deal of his time focusing on his national Youth United for Prosperity, (YUP).

Profit is the founder of Legends & Kids, a series of literacy workshops in cooperation with public and private schools systems across the nation.

=== Political career ===
Presidents Ronald Reagan and George H. W. Bush appointed him to various government advisory boards. He was appointed to the Federal Communications Commission Small Business Advisory Committee (FCC), the International Trade Board Subcommittee for Policy, International Trade Board Subcommittee for Policy, Federal Reserve Board, the White House Small Business Advisory Committee, and the U.S. Department of Transportation Advisory Board.

==== 2018 congressional campaign ====
In 2018, Profit challenged Democratic Congressman Hank Johnson. He won the Republican primary unopposed. He lost to Johnson 79%-21%.

==== 2020 congressional campaign ====
Profit initially decided to run for the open seat in Georgia's 7th congressional district, but on December 23, 2019 decided to switch races to challenge one-term incumbent Congresswoman Lucy McBath. He was defeated by former Republican congresswoman Karen Handel in the Republican primary election.

== Personal life ==
Profit married his first wife, Deborah Robinson, in 1971 and had four children from that union. In 2008, he married his second wife, Wanda. Presently, Profit and his wife reside in Marietta, Georgia. Profit ran as a Republican for Georgia's 4th district.
