= 1970 Little All-America college football team =

American college football all-star team

The 1970 Little All-America college football team is composed of college football players from small colleges and universities who were selected by the Associated Press (AP) as the best players at each position. For 1970, the AP selected three teams, each team having separate offensive and defensive platoons.

Jim Lindsey of Abilene Christian was selected as the first-team quarterback. During his time at Abilene Christian, he became college football's all-time passing leader, completing 642 of 1,237 passes for 8,521 yards and 61 touchdowns. Lindsey went on to play in the Canadian Football League (CFL).

Running back Leon Burns of Long Beach State was the only player to win first-team honors in both 1969 and 1970. He rushed for 1,033 yards in 1970, down from his 1969 totals of 1,659 yards and 27 touchdowns.

Joe Profit of Northeast Louisiana broke the Gulf Coast Conference all-time rushing record and was named to the conference's all-decade team for the 1960s. He was selected by the Atlanta Falcons in the first round (seventh overall) of the 1971 NFL draft.

Junior running back Leon McQuay of Tampa rushed for 1,362 yards, added 396 yards on kickoff returns, and scored 20 touchdowns. He skipped his senior season to play in the Canadian Football League (CFL). He was a CFL All-Star in 1971.

== First team ==
Position	Player	Team
Offense
QB	Jim Lindsey	Abilene Christian
RB	Leon Burns	Long Beach State
RB	Leon McQuay	Tampa
RB	Joe Profit	Northeast Louisiana
E	John Curtis	Springfield (MA)
E	Red Roberts	Austin Peay
T	Vernon Holland	Tennessee State
T	Melvin Holmes	North Carolina A&T
G	Bill Phillips	Arkansas State
G	Conway Hayman	Delaware
C	Jimmy Champion	Jacksonville State
Defense
DE	Lawrence Brame	Western Kentucky
DE	Richard Harris	Grambling
DT	Fred Carter	Alcorn A&M
DT	Charles Roundtree	Grambling
MG	Margarito Guerrero	Texas A&I
LB	Ronnie Hornsby	Southeastern Louisiana
LB	Len Pettigrew	Ashland
LB	Isiah Robertson	Southern
DB	Nate Allen	Texas Southern
DB	Joe Cichy	North Dakota State
DB	Vivian Lee	Prairie View A&M

== Second team ==
Position	Player	Team
Offense
QB	Dan Pastorini	Santa Clara
RB	Leroy Byars	Alcorn A&M
RB	Calvin Harrell	Arkansas State
RB	Steve Pelot	South Dakota
E	Vince Green	Troy State
E	Chris Myers	Kenyon
T	Rod Cason	Angelo State
T	John Morring	Tampa
G	Sterling Allen	Wofford
G	Jim Kalill	Hawaii
C	Billy Manning	Grambling
Defense
DE	Vern Den Herder	Central (IA)
DE	Gary Gustafson	Montana State
DT	Bill Bibbee	Wittenberg
DT	Dave Pureifory	Eastern Michigan
MG	Ernest Holmes	Texas Southern
LB	Tim Kearney	Northern Michigan
LB	Don McLean	North Dakota
LB	Robert Young	Texas A&I
DB	Walter Huntley	Trinity (TX)
DB	Cleophus Johnson	Alcorn A&M
DB	Dennis Meyer	Arkansas State

== Third team ==
Position	Player	Team
Offense
QB	Tim Von Dulm	Portland State
RB	Dom Flora	Bridgewater
RB	Chuck Hall	Delaware
RB	Rick Thompson	East Central (OK)
E	Frank Lewis	Grambling
E	Mike Savoy	Black Hills State
T	Len Gotshalk	Humboldt State
T	Dan Green	North Dakota State
G	Ross Bolce	Pacific Lutheran
G	Bill Soucy	Boston University
C	Bruce Jackson	Trinity (TX)
Defense
DE	Kelvin Korver	Northwestern (IA)
DE	Ronald Leigh	Elizabeth City State
DT	Sammy Gellerstedt	Tampa
DT	Larry Miller	Montana
MG	Roosevelt Manning	Northeastern Oklahoma State
LB	Pete Contaldi	Montclair State
LB	Terry Giltner	UT Martin
LB	Aubrey Johnson	Northeast Missouri State
DB	Steve Endemano	Claremont-Mudd
DB	Lynn Ferguson	Drexel
DB	Tom Williams	Willamette

== See also ==
- 1970 College Football All-America Team
