= Elmo Wright =

American football player (born 1949)

No. 23, 17
- Position: Wide receiver

Personal information
- Born: July 3, 1949 (age 77); Brazoria, Texas, U.S.
- Listed height: 6 ft 0 in (1.83 m)
- Listed weight: 195 lb (88 kg)

Career information
- High school: Carver (Sweeny, Texas); Sweeny (Sweeny)
- College: Houston
- NFL draft: 1971: 1st round, 16th overall pick

Career history
- Kansas City Chiefs (1971–1974); Houston Oilers (1975); New England Patriots (1975)

Awards and highlights
- All-Rookie (1971); Consensus All-American (1970); Second-team All-American (1969); Houston Cougars No. 23 retired

Career NFL statistics
- Receptions: 70
- Receiving yards: 1,116
- Receiving touchdowns: 6
- Stats at Pro Football Reference
- College Football Hall of Fame

Elmo Wright (born July 3, 1949) is an American former professional football player who was a wide receiver in the National Football League (NFL). Playing college football for the Houston Cougars, he became the first football player ever to perform an end zone dance. Wright was selected by the Kansas City Chiefs in the first round of the 1971 NFL draft.

== Early life ==
Wright was born on July 3, 1949, in Brazoria, Texas. He attended Carver High School in Sweeny, Texas, where his team won two state football championships during his two years of play (1965-1966); the first year in a segregated school system, and the next year desegregated. He was an All-State player in high school. In the Bulldogs' 1966 championship season, Wright had 33 receptions for 780 yards (23.6 yards per reception), while scoring 82 points.

== College football ==
Wright received a football scholarship to the University of Houston, where he studied engineering and was an Academic All-American. He played three years on the varsity team (1968-1970), wearing number 23. As a sophomore he had 43 pass receptions for 1,198 yards and 11 touchdowns; as well as 113 yards rushing in only five attempts. His 27.2 yards per reception average led all of Division I college football, 2.7 yards per catch more than any other player. He was third in total receiving yards and tied for fourth in touchdowns, even though not in the top 18 for total receptions. The Cougars finished the season ranked 18th, and Wright earned honorable mention All-America honors. He set the NCAA single-season record with eight touchdown receptions of 50 yards or more.

As a junior (1969), he had 63 receptions for 1,275 years, 14 touchdowns, and a 20.2 yards per reception average. The 14 touchdowns were either first or second in the nation, and he was third in yardage, seventh in receptions, and 11th in average yards. In a November 1969 game against Wyoming, he had 262 receiving yards. Wright was named second-team All-American, and the Cougars ranked 12th at the end of the year. Houston defeated Auburn in the Astro-Bluebonnet Bowl, 36–7.

As a senior, he had 47 receptions, for 874 yards, nine touchdowns and an 18.6 yards per receptions average; in the top 10 for touchdowns, and top 20 for total and average yards. The Cougars were ranked 19th in the nation at the end of the year. In 1970, Wright was a consensus first-team All-American, and was named the Touchdown Club of Columbus Player of the Year.

His 111.6 career receiving yards per game were the second most in FBS history at the end of his career and still rank 12th all-time (as of 2020). His 21.9 yards per reception career average is fourth all-time in NCAA Division I history (as of 2024). Wright holds five Houston records: all-purpose career average yards per play (21.0); yards per reception in a season (27.9); yards per reception in a career (21.9); 200-yard receiving games in a season (2 each in 1968 and 1969); and 200-yard receiving games in a career (4). He also holds the school record with four touchdown receptions in a game.

=== Touchdown celebration ===
While an outstanding football player, Wright also became known for his running style and celebratory scoring. During a game in his junior year against Florida, he caught a pass and was wrapped up by the defender, future NFL player Steve Tannen. Wright broke away from Tannen by "high-stepping", and continued high-stepping toward the endzone for a touchdown. Once he scored, Wright began rapidly pumping his legs while high-stepping, which some have called the first touchdown celebration dance. He repeated his high-stepping dances after other ensuing touchdowns. Wright had been in the high school band before joining the football team, and this had given him an "'entertainment mindset'".

While this was no comparison to the antics later displayed by such famed celebrators as Billy "White Shoes" Johnson, Ickey Woods or Terrell Owens, being as much a drum major strut as a dance, it was almost equally shocking at the time, being booed by the Florida fans as he high-stepped toward the endzone that very first time. There was also a racial component in negativity toward his celebrations when Houston played some of the southern universities. Other critics thought it expressed too much individuality for a military-like team sport.

== Professional football ==
The Kansas City Chiefs selected Wright in the first round of the 1971 NFL draft (16th overall). As a rookie, he started all 14 games, had 26 receptions for 528 yards (20.3 yards per catch), with three touchdowns and a career-long reception of 69 yards. A knee injury toward the end of the season was the beginning of a steep decline in Wright's play. He would have three knee surgeries during his shortened five-year career. In 1972, he played in only seven games for the Chiefs, with 11 receptions. In 1973-74 with the Chiefs, he played in more games, but had only 16 and 13 receptions, respectively. In 1975, Wright's final year in the NFL, he played two games for the Houston Oilers with no receptions, and four games for the New England Patriots with four receptions.

On November 18, 1973, Wright introduced his endzone celebratory dance into the NFL, a first in the league. He would have stopped doing it if his coach Hank Stram had asked, but Stram just told him to keep scoring touchdowns, understanding the entertainment aspect of football.

== Honors ==
In 1976, Wright was inducted into the University of Houston Athletics Hall of Fame. In 1993, he was inducted into the Texas High School Football Hall of Fame. In 2020, Wright was inducted into the College Football Hall of Fame.

== Personal life ==
After retiring, Wright worked in land development in the private and public sectors. He was a finance officer for Harris County, and became Chief of Staff to Harris County Commissioner Jim Fonteno, working in his office for over two decades. During this time Wright obtained a Master of Business Administration degree from the University of Houston's C.T. Bauer College of Business (MBA 1985). He subsequently mentored Bauer business students.
