= Kevin Garrett (American football) =

American gridiron football player (born 1980)

No. 21, 25, 7
- Position: Cornerback

Personal information
- Born: July 29, 1980 (age 46); San Benito, Texas, U.S.
- Listed height: 5 ft 10 in (1.78 m)
- Listed weight: 194 lb (88 kg)

Career information
- High school: Sweeny (Sweeny, Texas)
- College: Southern Methodist
- NFL draft: 2003: 5th round, 172nd overall pick

Career history
- St. Louis Rams (2003–2004); Kansas City Chiefs (2006)*; Houston Texans (2006); Carolina Panthers (2007)*; → Amsterdam Admirals (2007); Calgary Stampeders (2007); Saskatchewan Roughriders (2008)*; Winnipeg Blue Bombers (2008)*
- * Offseason or practice squad member only

Career NFL statistics
- Total tackles: 26
- Pass deflections: 4
- Stats at Pro Football Reference
- Stats at CFL.ca (archive)

Kevin Rashard Garrett (born July 29, 1980) is an American former professional football player. Garrett attended Southern Methodist University and was selected in the 2003 NFL draft by the St. Louis Rams. He was also a member of the Kansas City Chiefs, Houston Texans, Amsterdam Admirals, Calgary Stampeders, Carolina Panthers, Saskatchewan Roughriders, and Winnipeg Blue Bombers.

== College career ==
He started 42 games at Southern Methodist and totaled 265 tackles, seven interceptions, 36 passes defensed, four forced fumbles and one fumble recovery in addition to blocking six kicks. In 2002 as a senior he made nine starts and registered 48 tackles, two interceptions, six passes defensed, one forced fumble, one fumble recovery and one blocked kick. The year before, in 2001, he started all 11 games and was an honorable mention All-Western Athletic Conference selection. He collected 62 tackles, three interceptions with one return for a touchdown, 14 passes defensed and one blocked kick. In 2000, he started all 12 game and ranked second on the Mustangs with 74 tackles, one interception, 12 passes defensed, two forced fumbles and two blocked kicks. In 1999, he was named Western Athletic Conference Freshman of the Year by the Fort Worth Star-Telegram. He made 10 starts and had a career-high 81 tackles, one interception, four passes defensed, one forced fumble and two blocked kicks. In 1998 Garrett redshirted as a true freshman.

=== Track and field ===
Garrett was also a track star at the Southern Methodist University, where he specialized in the 60 meters, 100 meters and 200 meters, but also participated in the 55 metres, posting a personal best of 6.41 seconds.

Garrett ran a 10.29 wind-aided in the 100 meters at Fresno, California.

Personal bests

Event	Time (seconds)	Venue	Date
55 metres	6.41	Reno, Nevada	February 22, 2002
60 meters	6.81	Nampa, Idaho	February 28, 2003
100 meters	10.35	Fresno, California	May 19, 2001
200 meters	20.98	Fresno, California	May 19, 2001

== Professional career ==
Pre-draft measurables
Height	Weight	Arm length	Hand span	40-yard dash	10-yard split	20-yard split	20-yard shuttle	Three-cone drill	Vertical jump	Broad jump
5 ft 9 3/8 in (1.76 m)	194 lb (88 kg)	31 3/8 in (0.80 m)	8 3/4 in (0.22 m)	4.35 s	1.57 s	2.52 s	3.96 s	6.90 s	35 in (0.89 m)	10 ft 9 in (3.28 m)
All values from NFL Combine

Garrett was selected in the fifth round (172nd overall) of the 2003 NFL draft by the St. Louis Rams. He played in nine games, primarily on special teams, in 2003 and was inactive for seven contests due to an injury suffered during the preseason. He posted eight special teams tackles. In 2004, he played in 14 games with one start, making 10 tackles, four passes defensed and 12 special teams stops. The next season, he went to training camp with St. Louis but was waived by the Rams in the final roster cutdown on September 3, 2005.

Garrett signed a reserve/future contract with the Kansas City Chiefs on January 9, 2006. He was waived on July 25, 2006.

Garrett was signed by the Houston Texans on August 1, 2006, waived on September 3, re-signed on September 12, and waived again on September 20 after suffering a hamstring injury. Overall, he played in one game for the Texans during the 2006 season and recorded one assisted tackle.

Garrett signed a reserve/future contract with the Carolina Panthers on January 2, 2007. He was allocated to NFL Europa in 2007 and played for the Amsterdam Admirals during the 2007 NFL Europa season. He played in seven games, all starts, for the Admirals, recording 19 tackles and six pass breakups. He was waived by the Panthers on August 27, 2007.

After being waived by the Panthers, Garrett signed with the Calgary Stampeders of the Canadian Football League (CFL). He appeared in four games, starting one, for the Stampeders during the 2007 CFL season, totaling four tackles on defense, two special teams tackles and one pass breakup. He also returned two kicks for 33 yards.

Garrett later signed with the Saskatchewan Roughriders of the CFL.

On June 10, 2008, Garrett was traded to the Winnipeg Blue Bombers for a negotiation list player and future considerations. He was released on June 22, 2008.
