= Sweeny, Texas =

City in Texas, United States

- City
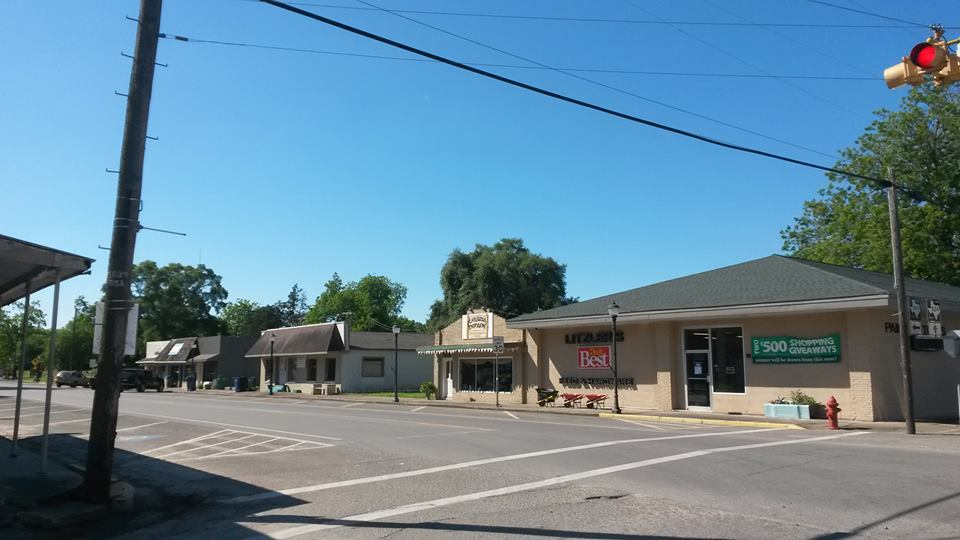
- Downtown Sweeny

- Flag
- Motto: A City with Pride
- Coordinates: 29°2′35″N 95°42′0″W
- Country: United States
- State: Texas
- County: Brazoria
- Incorporated (town): 1945

Government
  - Type: Council-Manager
  - Mayor: Dusty Hopkins

Area
  - Total: 1.99 sq mi (5.15 km^{2})
  - Land: 1.99 sq mi (5.15 km^{2})
  - Water: 0 sq mi (0.00 km^{2})
- Elevation: 30 ft (9 m)

Population (2020)
  - Total: 3,626
  - Density: 1,869.6/sq mi (721.86/km^{2})
- Time zone: UTC−6 (Central Time Zone)
  - Summer (DST): UTC−5 (CDT)
- ZIP Code: 77480
- Area code: 979
- FIPS code: 48-71492
- GNIS feature ID: 1369461
- Website: www.sweenytx.gov

Sweeny is a city in Brazoria County, Texas, United States, the westernmost incorporated town in the county. The population was 3,626 as of 2020. The city's motto is "A City with Pride". The city was once known as Adamston.

== Geography and transport ==
Sweeny is 30 feet (9.1 m) above sea level and is 20 miles (32 km) from the Gulf of Mexico. The San Bernard River flows 1-mile (1.6 km) east of city limits. The town is in a dense forest on coastal plains.

Sweeny is at the intersections of Texas Farm to Market Roads 1459 and 524, along the Missouri Pacific Railroad, twenty miles southwest of Angleton, in west central Brazoria County.

The Union Pacific Railroad cuts a path through a small piece of the south side of Sweeny, with two grade crossings and a railyard. Train speeds through here usually range from 35 to 60 miles per hour (56 to 97 km/h).

== Demographics ==
=== 2020 census ===
As of the 2020 census, Sweeny had a population of 3,626. The median age was 37.8 years. 26.7% of residents were under the age of 18 and 17.6% of residents were 65 years of age or older. For every 100 females there were 94.0 males, and for every 100 females age 18 and over there were 88.9 males age 18 and over.

0.0% of residents lived in urban areas, while 100.0% lived in rural areas.

There were 1,353 households in Sweeny, of which 38.8% had children under the age of 18 living in them. Of all households, 45.3% were married-couple households, 18.7% were households with a male householder and no spouse or partner present, and 29.7% were households with a female householder and no spouse or partner present. About 24.6% of all households were made up of individuals and 12.2% had someone living alone who was 65 years of age or older.

There were 1,570 housing units, of which 13.8% were vacant. The homeowner vacancy rate was 2.8% and the rental vacancy rate was 18.0%.

Racial composition as of the 2020 census
Race	Number	Percent
White	2,396	66.1%
Black or African American	611	16.9%
American Indian and Alaska Native	18	0.5%
Asian	24	0.7%
Native Hawaiian and Other Pacific Islander	2	0.1%
Some other race	205	5.7%
Two or more races	370	10.2%
Hispanic or Latino (of any race)	697	19.2%

=== 2000 census ===
At the 2000 census, there were 3,624 people, 1,338 households and 974 families residing in the city. The population density was 1,946.6 inhabitants per square mile (751.6/km^{2}). There were 1,444 housing units at an average density of 775.6 per square mile (299.5/km^{2}). The racial makeup of the city was 75.25% White, 15.78% African American, 1.02% Native American, 0.41% Asian, 5.99% from other races, and 1.55% from two or more races. Hispanic or Latino of any race were 13.71% of the population.

There were 1,338 households, of which 38.0% had children under the age of 18 living with them, 53.8% were married couples living together, 14.9% had a female householder with no husband present, and 27.2% were non-families. Of all households, 23.7% were made up of individuals, and 11.4% had someone living alone who was 65 years of age or older. The average household size was 2.65 and the average family size was 3.14.

Of the population, 29.7% were under the age of 18, 8.4% from 18 to 24, 26.1% from 25 to 44, 19.7% from 45 to 64, and 16.1% who were 65 years of age or older. The median age was 35 years. For every 100 females, there were 122.3 males. For every 100 females age 18 and over, there were 145.3 males.

The median household income was $36,497 and the median family income was $42,128. Males had a median income of $43,854 compared with $25,710 for females. The per capita income for the city was $16,755. About 10.4% of families and 9.9% of the population were below the poverty line, including 9.4% of those under age 18 and 11.7% of those age 65 or over.

Historical population
Census	Pop.	Note	%±
1950	1,393		—
1960	3,087		121.6%
1970	3,191		3.4%
1980	3,538		10.9%
1990	3,297		−6.8%
2000	3,624		9.9%
2010	3,684		1.7%
2020	3,626		−1.6%
U.S. Decennial Census

== Government and services ==
Sweeny has a council-manager form of government, following the adoption of a Home Rule Charter in 1999. The city council consists of a mayor and five council members serving two-year staggered terms. The city manager is appointed by the city council and is responsible for administration of the city. The City Judge remains an elected position, but all other department heads are appointed by the city manager with the approval of the City Council.

The city has a police department (Sweeny PD), a volunteer fire department (Sweeny Fire and Rescue), and a hospital (Sweeny Community Hospital) which is a state-recognized level IV trauma center and operates the city's emergency medical services (Sweeny EMS).

The Sweeny Library, part of the Brazoria County Library System, is located at 205 West Ashley-Wilson Road.

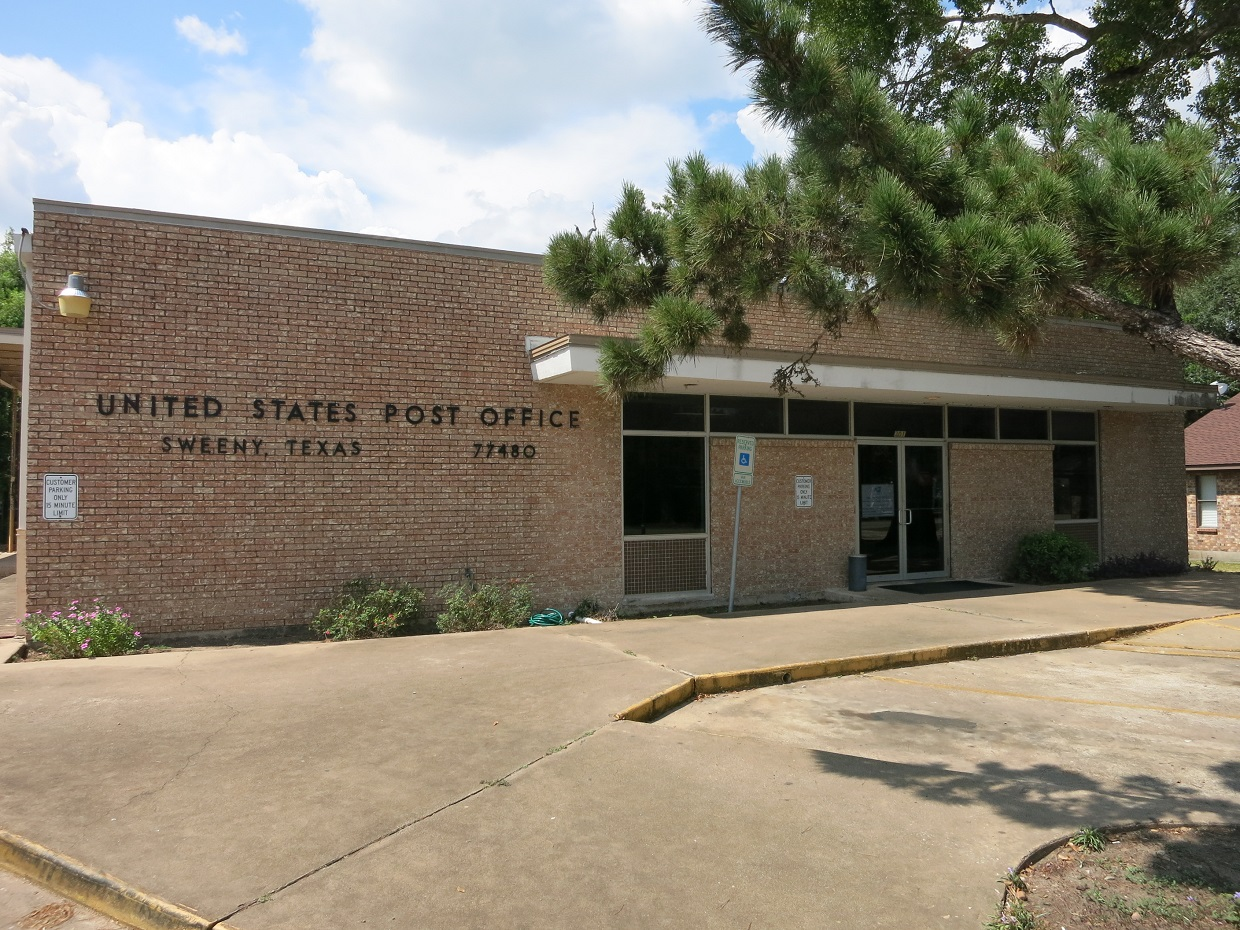
US Post Office on 2nd (FM 1459) and Elm Streets

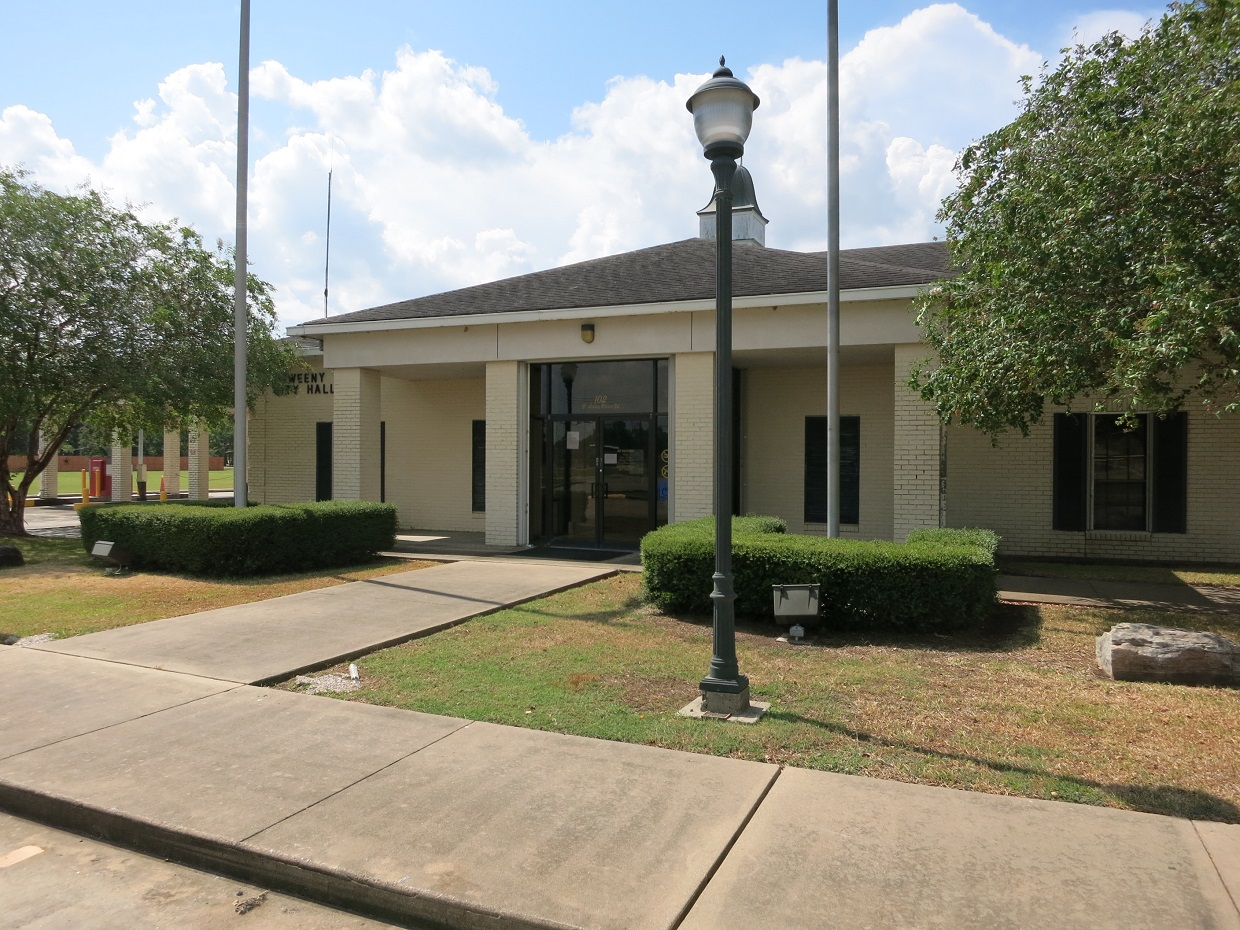
Sweeny City Hall on Ashley Wilson Road

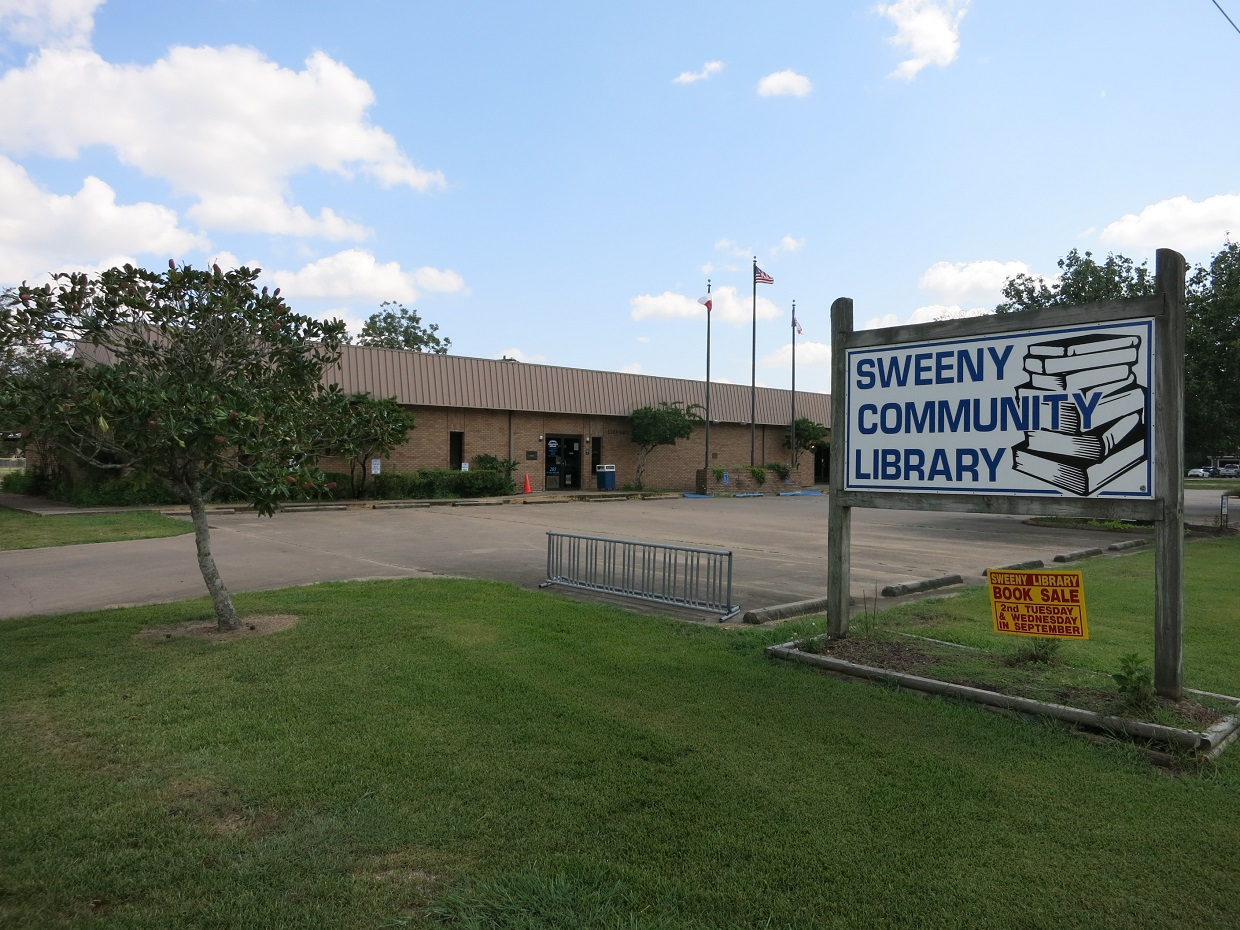
Sweeny Community Library on Ashley Wilson Road

== Health care ==
The Sweeny Hospital District was established by an act of the Texas Legislature in 1963 following a decade-long community effort to expand healthcare in the area. Since opening in 1965, Sweeny Community Hospital has continued to grow, employing approximately 190 employees in Sweeny, Brazoria, and West Columbia. It is licensed for 20 inpatient beds, and is a Level IV Trauma Center with a dedicated surgical suite.

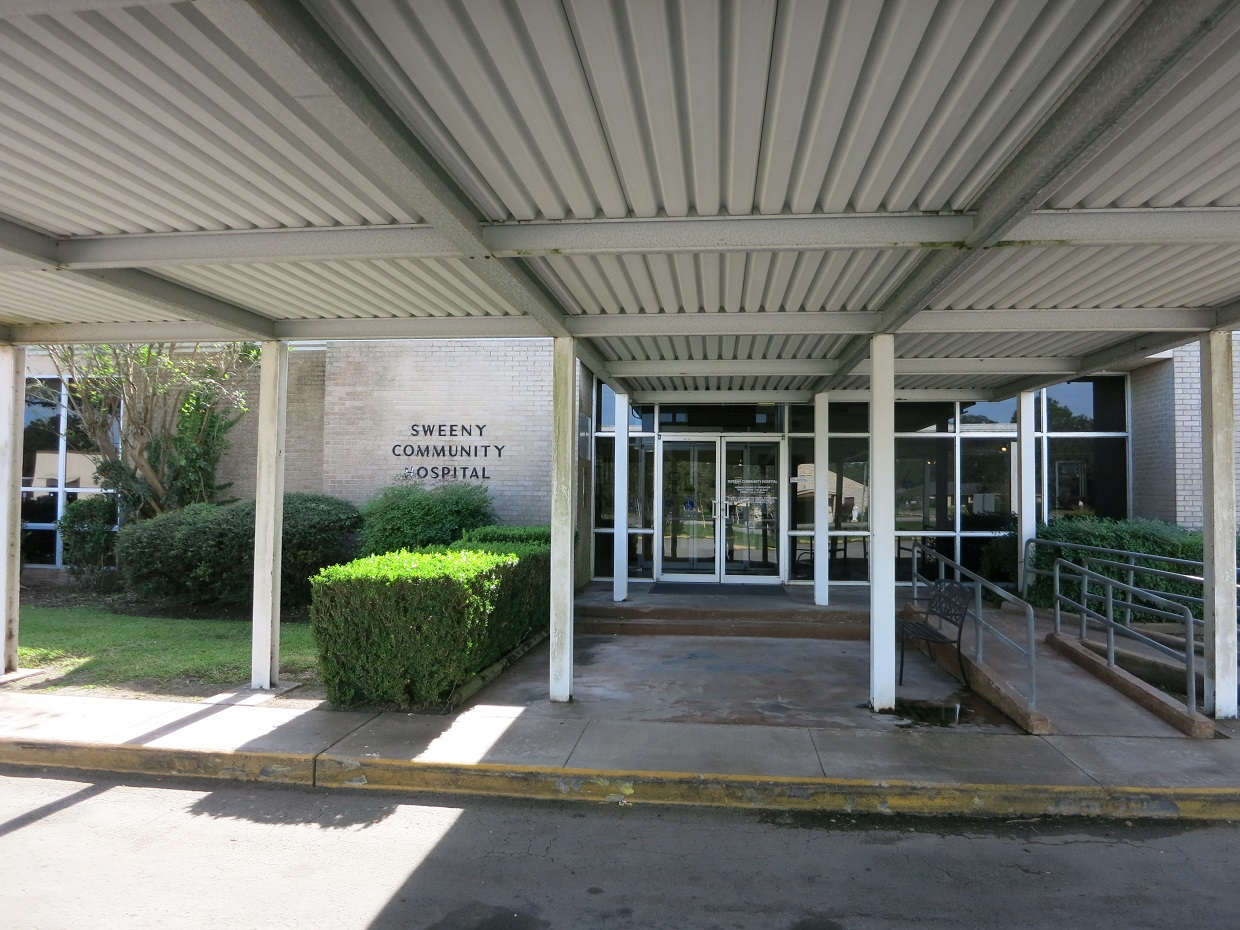
Sweeny Community Hospital on FM 1459

== History ==
Sweeny's settlement, though not under this name, began before Texas was even a Republic. Imla Keep, a doctor and member of Stephen F. Austin's Old Three Hundred colonists, received title to a league and labor of land that included the site of Sweeny on July 24, 1824. Keep eventually returned to Louisiana, and Martin Varner acquired the land. The land was named for John Sweeny, a Tennessee colonist who arrived with family members and 250 slaves in the area in 1833. He came after his sons, William Burrell and Thomas Jefferson Sweeny, had purchased land grants near the townsite. They purchased the land grants for the price of a load of mules, and came to examine their new land holdings in 1831. John Sweeny settled nearby, and in 1835, purchased the original Imla Keep League from Varner and constructed a house on the site. The home, today the Sweeny Plantation, a Recorded Texas Historic Landmark, was occupied by original family members through the 1990s. The original home was built in 1837 by slaves using only bricks, nails, and cypress and ash wood from the land. There were also 30 slave cabins made of cypress wood. The plantation had its own sawmill, sugar house, cotton gin, blacksmith shop, commissary, and a kiln for brick manufacture.

The town was named for John Sweeny.

The original town stood in a forest of hardwoods with soil twenty feet deep. Sweeny was briefly called Adamston when the St. Louis, Brownsville and Mexico Railway reached the area in 1905 and laid a side track lined with gardens to the community. A post office was established in 1895, closed in 1897, and was reestablished in 1909 as Sweeny. Sweeny's cotton gin and general store were built by 1908, a school was organized in 1911 with eleven students, and church services were held in 1912, when a Civic Club was founded to promote civic and social improvements. Around 1910 the R. D. McDonald Bernard River Land Development Company, which later gave a plot of land to each church denomination, purchased acreage in the area, cut it into lots, and sold it.

Burton D. Hurd platted the townsite in 1911. His Burton D. Hurd Industrial Land Company promoted ten-acre suburban garden farms in the area with the slogan, "Soil Richer Than the Valley of the River Nile" to prospective settlers.

By 1914 the community had a hotel, a flour mill, three general stores, a cotton gin, a gristmill, a sawmill, and a population of 200. In the 1920s Sweeny shipped cotton, vegetables, live-oak parts for ships, and, for a time, bullfrogs raised by area farmers. In 1918 it had a brick factory and an orange orchard. Sweeny had an independent school system by 1912; school enrollment reached 236 by 1927, and by 1937 the community had three black schools and an all-grade white school with six teachers. The Ku Klux Klan operated briefly and held one cross-burning in the community.

In 1934, oil was discovered in Old Ocean, creating development which made Sweeny prosper. In 1942, a government carbon black plant was built which was taken over by Phillips Petroleum, which developed the facilities into a refinery, natural gas liquids center, and petrochemicals complex with pipelines to markets in the eastern United States. In 2000, Phillips Petroleum merged with Conoco Inc. to form ConocoPhillips. Sweeny's population in the latter 20th century has fluctuated from 3,087 to 3,699.

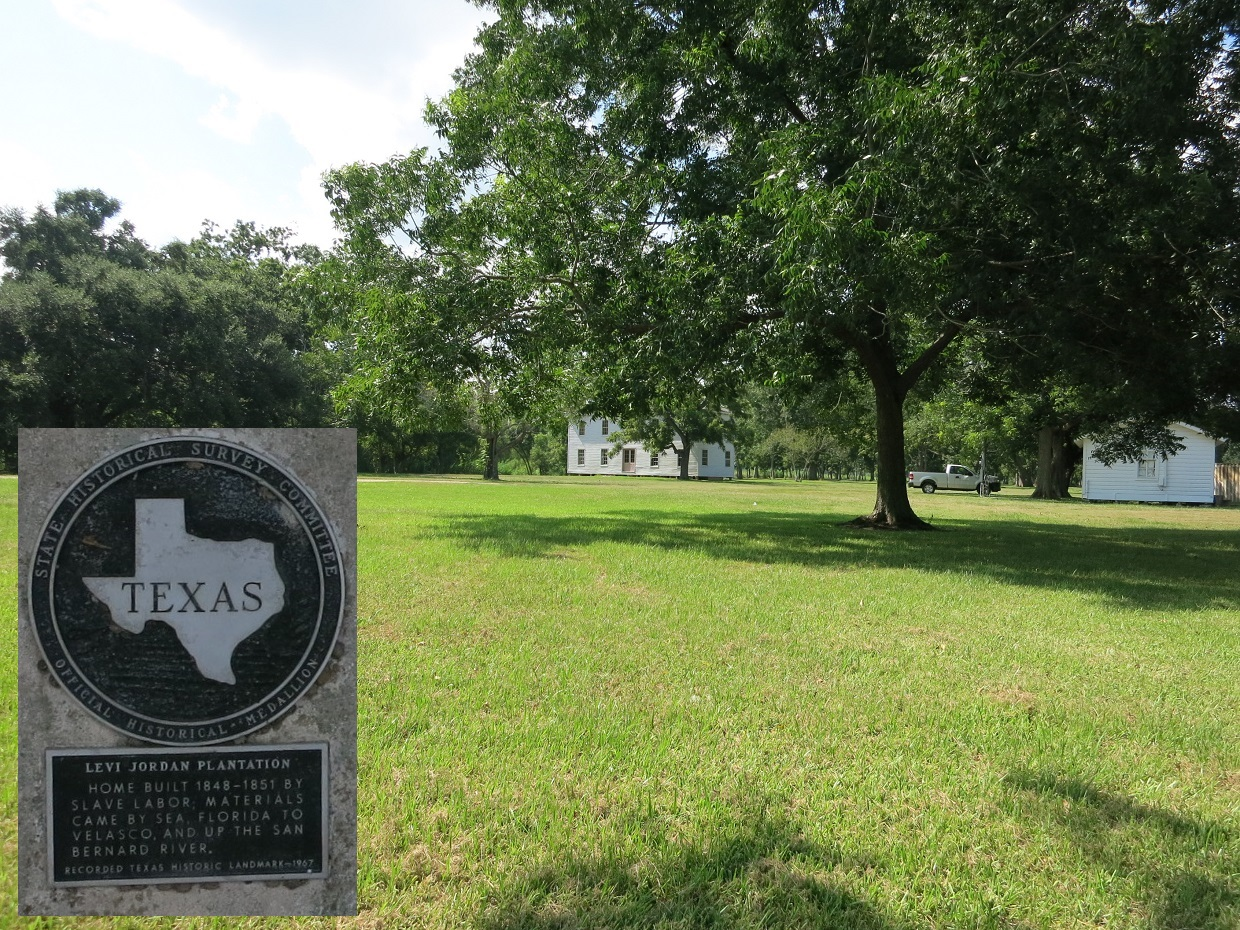
Levi Jordan Plantation State Historic Site on FM 521

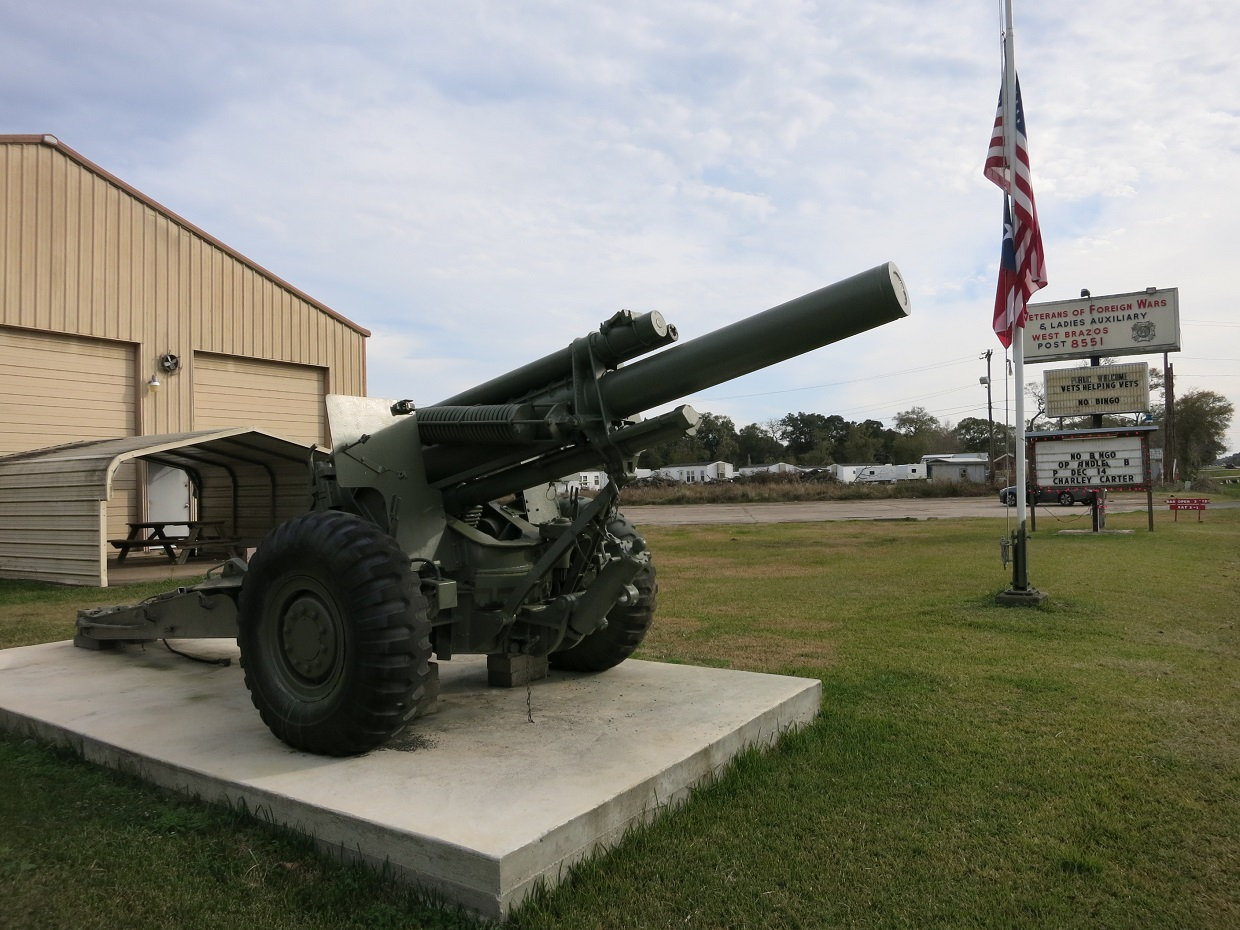
155 mm Howitzer at VFW Post 8551 on FM 1459

== Timeline of Sweeny ==
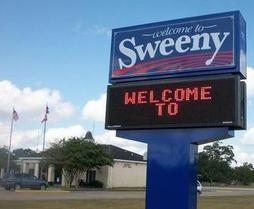
Welcome sign in front of City Hall

- 1833: John Sweeny settles just outside what will become a town bearing his name.
- 1905: Railroad reaches town.
- 1912: Independent school system formed.
- 1914: Population reaches 200.
- 1934: Old ocean oilfield discovered.
- 1945: City incorporated.
- 1966: Won state in football.
- 1967: City park built.
- 1985: Won state in basketball.
- 1985: Won state in baseball.
- 1986: Won state in basketball.
- 1987: Won state in basketball.
- 1988: Community Center / Library completed.
- 2002: Tropical Storm Fay dumps over 20 inches (510 mm) of rain in Sweeny, flooding most roads.
- 2004: Sweeny has Christmas snow, with almost 10 inches reported in some places.
- 2007: Running out of space to grow, Sweeny plans to start annexing land.
- 2008: Sweeny's mayoral race is decided by a single vote. Rodney Weems beat Phyllis Kittinger for the title. In the November general election, voters approved the sale of alcohol in Sweeny for the first time. Southeast Texas receives an early Christmas present, another snow fall
- 2010: Hurricane Alex made landfall in Mexico. Rain bands from Alex dumped more than a foot of rain over two days, flooding houses twice within 24 hours.
- 2011: FM 524 bypass from State Highway 35 to County Road 359 in Old Ocean is completed, giving travelers from the west a route around the ConocoPhillips refinery.
- Early 2012: Sweeny is once again flooded by heavy downpours, with several roads closed and water in some residences, although work is being done to alleviate the constant flood problems.

== Education ==
Schools are part of the Sweeny Independent School District which serves the city of Sweeny as well as outlying areas including Churchill, Shady Acres, River's End and Old Ocean. The high school's mascot is the Bulldog.

Schools in the district are Sweeny Elementary (K–5), Sweeny Junior High (6–8) and Sweeny High School (9–12), which is a 4A school. In 2007, construction began on the high school to renovate the older building. With growing security concerns, the Board of Trustees approved the renovation of the school, because most of the campus was open to the outside. The current school now has limited outside access. Classes met in the newly renovated building December 1, 2008.

The Texas Legislature assigned the area in Sweeny ISD to the Brazosport College district. Brazosport College and Wharton County Junior College are both within a 45-minute drive of Sweeny.

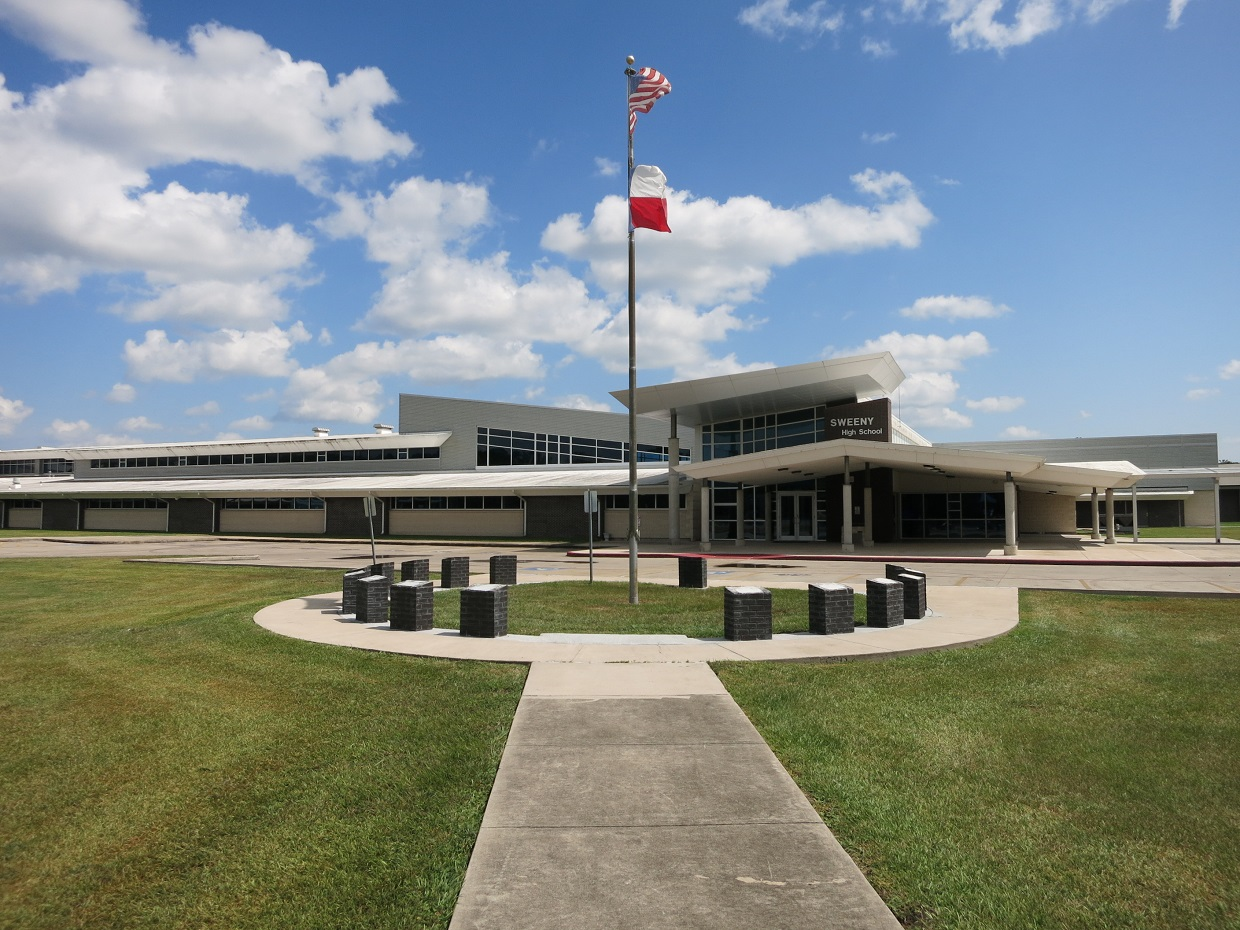
Sweeny High School on Ashley-Wilson Road

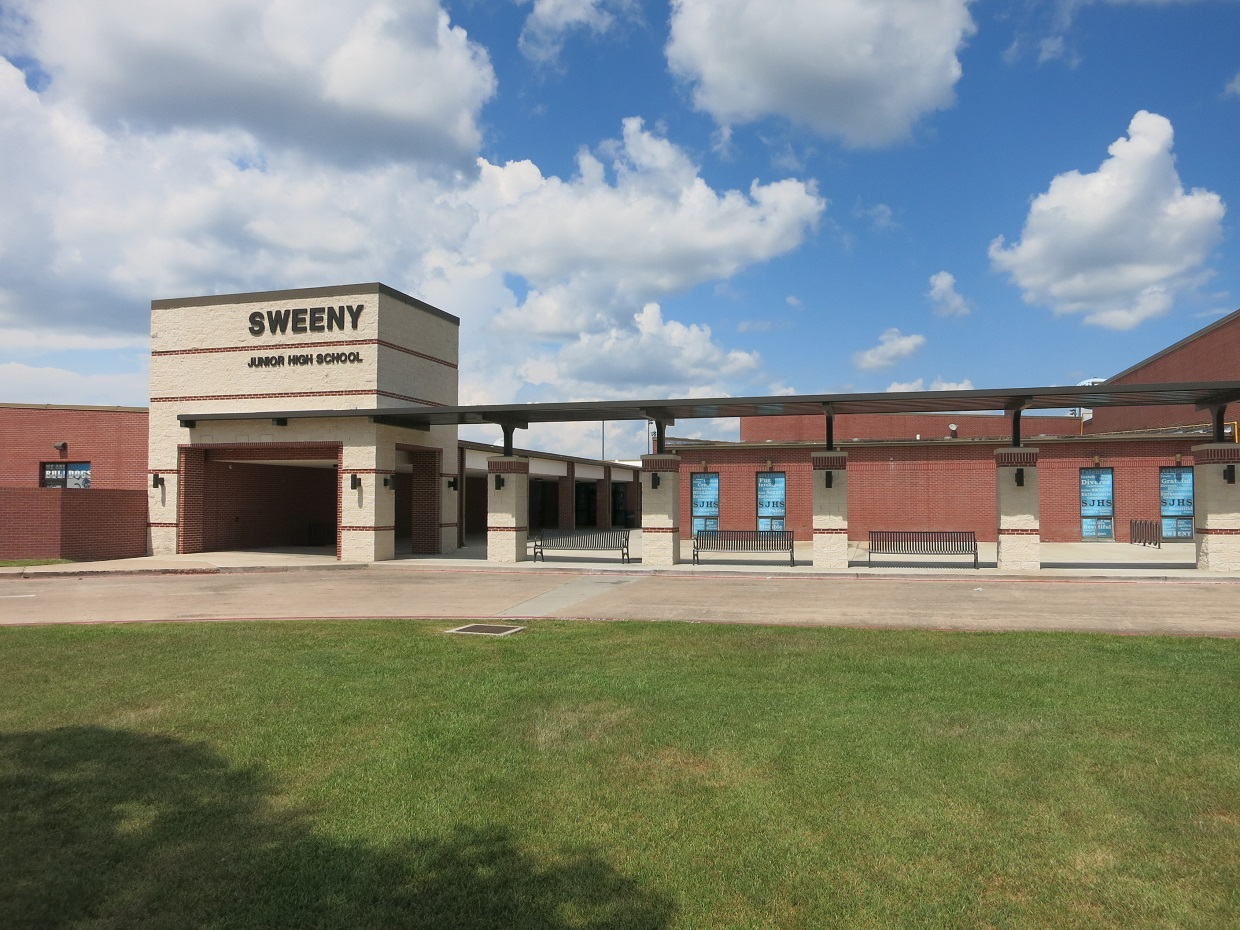
Sweeny Junior High School on Elm Street

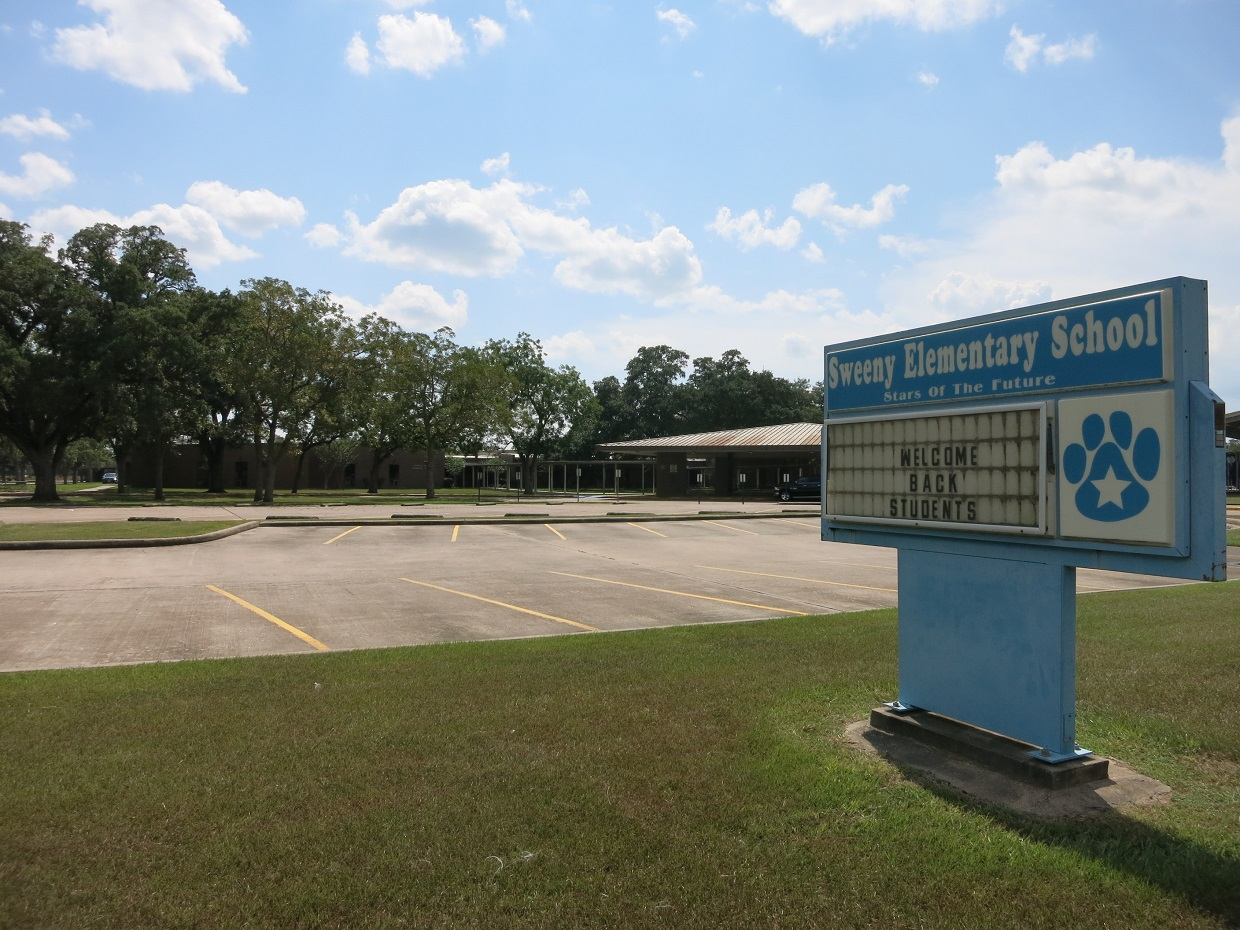
Sweeny Elementary School on Sycamore Street

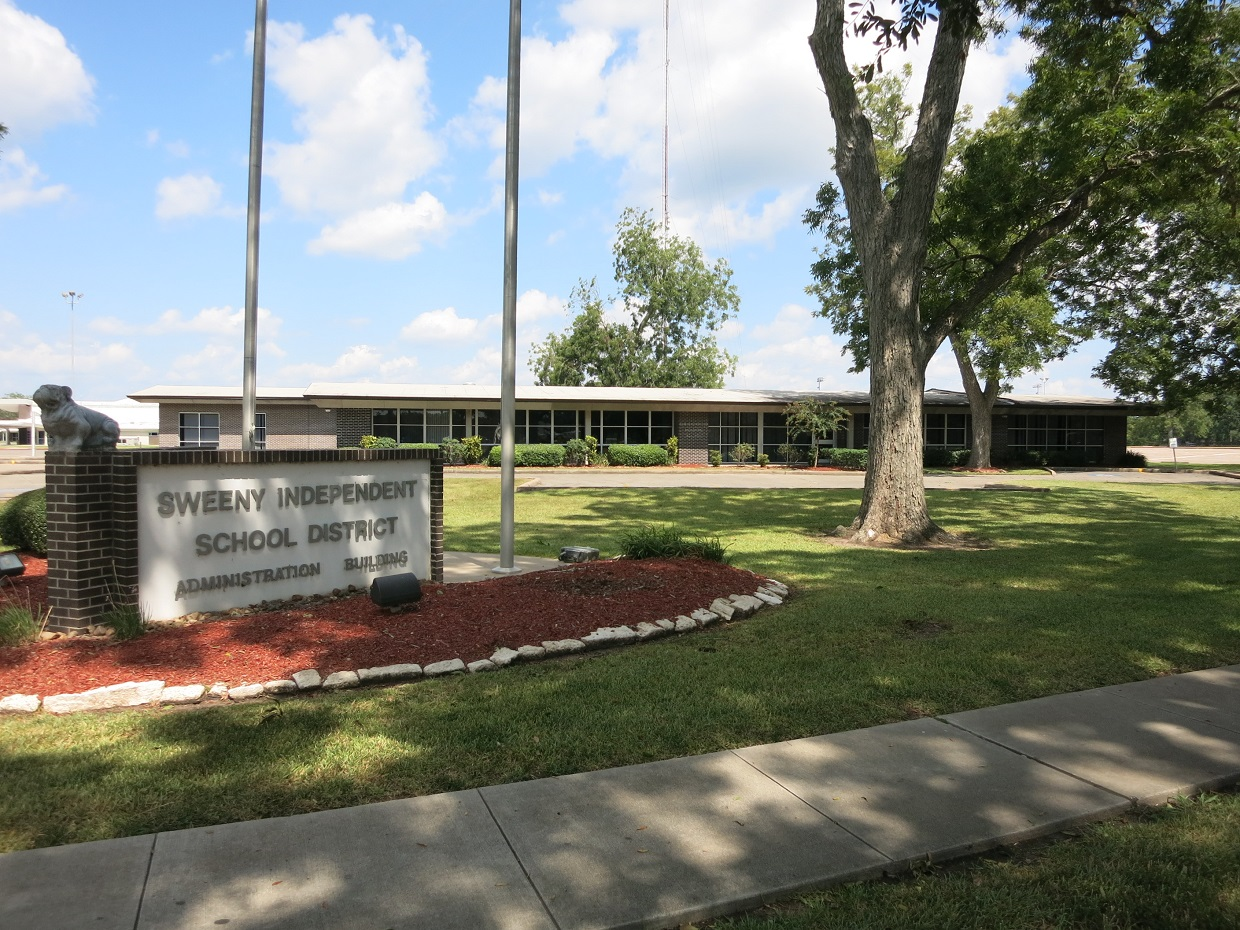
Sweeny ISD Administration Building

Elementary: Pre K–5th grade

Junior High: 6th–8th grade

High School: 9–graduation

== Notable people ==
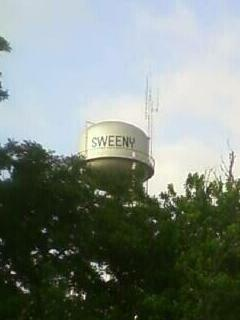
Water tower

- Ray Butler, former NFL wide receiver, Baltimore Colts and Seattle Seahawks
- Tank Carder, TCU linebacker Cleveland Browns
- Kevin Garrett, former NFL cornerback
- Rusty Hall, NHRA Stock Eliminator Drag Racer. Winner of the 2002 U.S. Nationals, Multi-time National and Divisional Event Winner. Division 7 Champion 2010
- Johnnie Lee Higgins, former NFL wide receiver
- Tracy Simien, former NFL linebacker
- Darrel Johnson Fort Cobb Longhorn Class of 1990; former college basketball coach and professional scout
- Clarence Williams, former NFL defensive tackle
- Cedric Woodard, former NFL defensive tackle
- Elmo Wright, former NFL wide receiver, credited with the first touchdown celebration dance
