= Tank Carder =

American football player (born 1989)

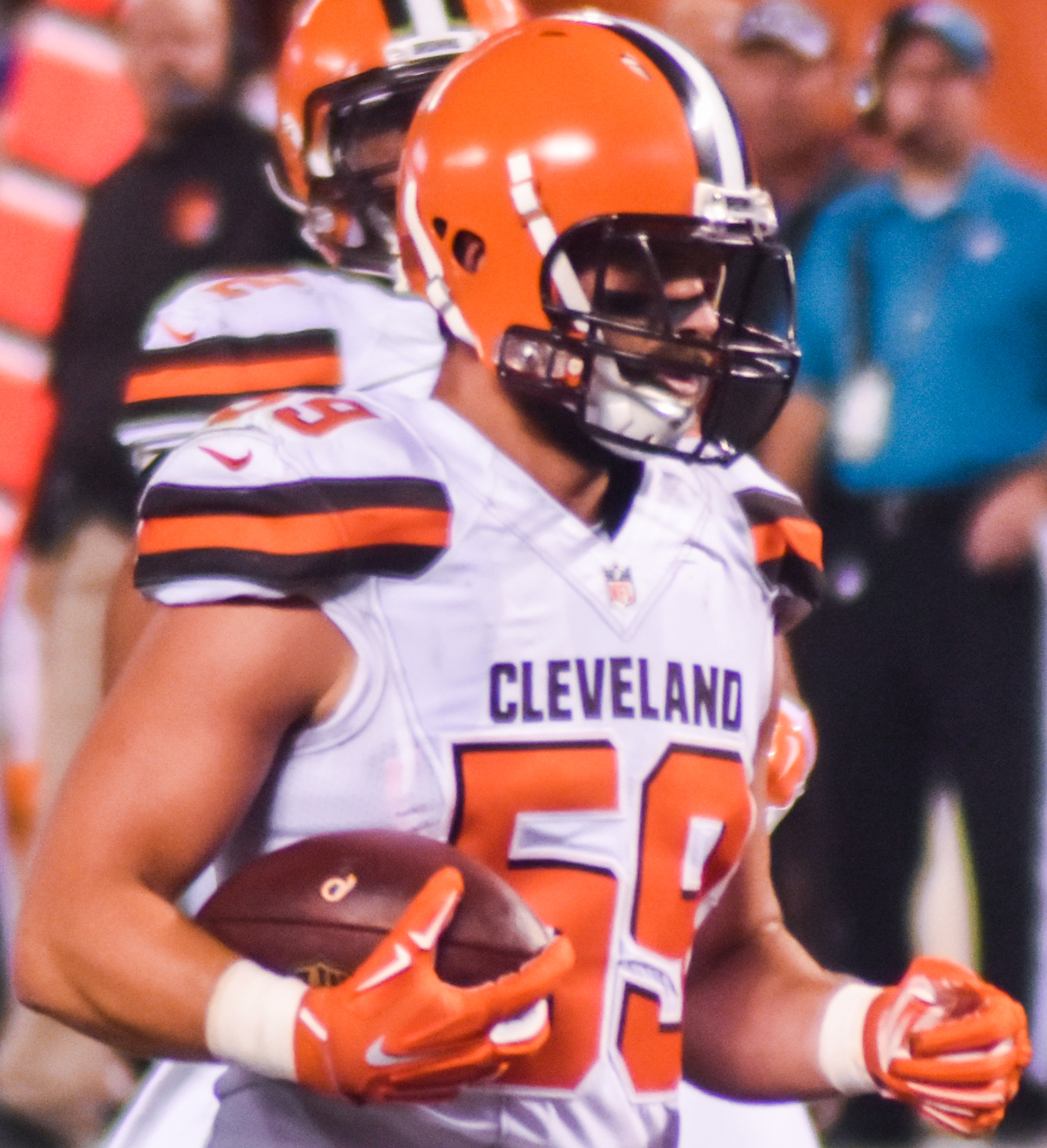
- Carder with the Cleveland Browns in 2015

No. 94, 59
- Position: Linebacker

Personal information
- Born: January 18, 1989 (age 37); Sweeny, Texas, U.S.
- Listed height: 6 ft 2 in (1.88 m)
- Listed weight: 235 lb (107 kg)

Career information
- High school: Sweeny
- College: TCU
- NFL draft: 2012: 5th round, 147th overall pick

Career history
- Buffalo Bills (2012)*; Cleveland Browns (2012–2017)
- * Offseason or practice squad member only

Awards and highlights
- First-team All-American (2010); Third-team All-American (2011); 2× MW Defensive Player of the Year (2010, 2011); 2× First-team All-MW (2010, 2011); Second-team All-MW (2009)

Career NFL statistics
- Total tackles: 53
- Stats at Pro Football Reference

Ricky "Tank" Carder Jr. (born January 18, 1989) is an American former professional football player who was a linebacker in the National Football League (NFL). Carder played college football for the TCU Horned Frogs. He was a 2010 All-American selection by the American Football Coaches Association.

== Early life ==
When he was 10 years old, Carder was a BMX World Champion. Battled back from a life-threatening injury at age 13, when he sustained a broken back, broken ribs, a punctured diaphragm and punctured lung after being thrown from a vehicle, which then rolled over him.

Carder attended Sweeny High School in Texas, where he accounted for 1,200 yards of offense and 116 tackles on defense in his senior year. He was regarded as a two-star recruit by Rivals.com.

== College career ==
Four-year letterman at Texas Christian University, where he was named a two-time Mountain West Conference Defensive Player of the Year (2010, 2011).

In the 2011 Rose Bowl, Carder was named Defensive MVP of the Game. He batted down a two-point conversion pass late in the fourth quarter that would have tied the game to go into overtime but secured the win for TCU with a final score of 21–19.

== Professional career ==
=== Buffalo Bills ===
Carder was selected in the fifth round, 147th overall, in the 2012 NFL draft by the Buffalo Bills. On August 31, 2012, the Bills released Carder for final roster cuts.

=== Cleveland Browns ===
Carder was claimed off waivers by the Cleveland Browns on September 4, 2012. He has played in 30 career games, with two starts at linebacker, and is a primary contributor on special teams.

The Browns re-signed Carder on March 7, 2016.

In the second preseason game of 2017, Carder suffered a torn ACL and was ruled out for the season.

On March 26, 2018, Carder re-signed with the Browns. He was released by the Browns on June 5, 2018.

== Twitter Controversy ==
On November 21, 2012, Carder sent a tweet calling another Twitter user a “faggot,” leading to calls that he be fined and suspended. The tweet was in response to a tweet about Call of Duty made by a satirical comedy account. Carder stood by his statements, tweeting “I don’t agree with being gay or lesbian at all, but saying faggot doesn’t make me a homophobe, it’s just a word.” Carder has since deleted the tweets and apologized, claiming his tweets did not reflect his character. The NFL did not impose any suspensions or fines.
