= Johnnie Lee Higgins =

American football player (born 1983)

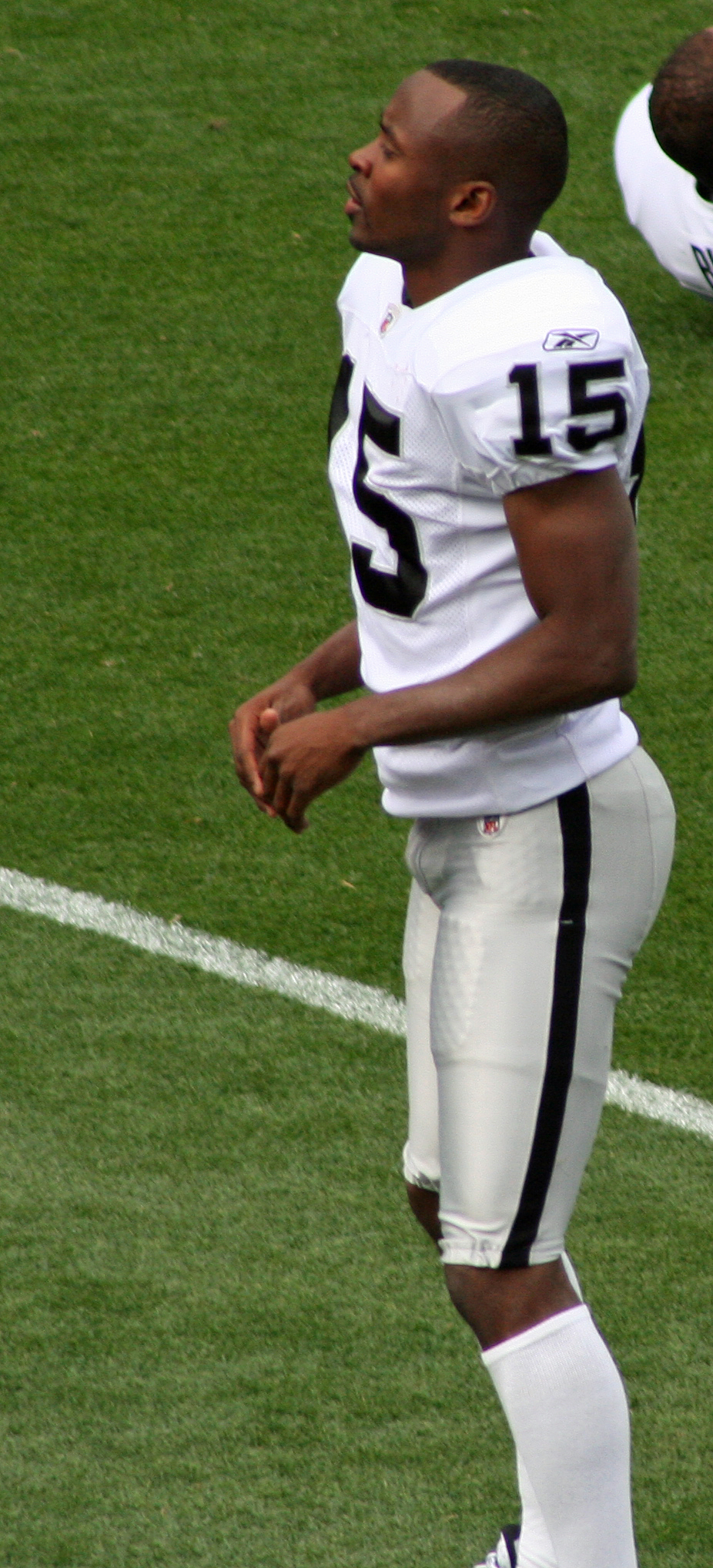
- Higgins at a game in Denver in October 2010

No. 15
- Position: Wide receiver / Return specialist

Personal information
- Born: September 8, 1983 (age 43); Sweeny, Texas, U.S.
- Listed height: 5 ft 11 in (1.80 m)
- Listed weight: 185 lb (84 kg)

Career information
- High school: Sweeny
- College: UTEP
- NFL draft: 2007: 3rd round, 99th overall pick

Career history
- Oakland Raiders (2007–2010); Philadelphia Eagles (2011)*; Virginia Destroyers (2012)
- * Offseason or practice squad member only

Awards and highlights
- NFL punt return yards leader (2008); First-team All-Pro (2008); First-team All-American (2006); C-USA Special Teams POY (2006)

Career NFL statistics
- Receptions: 57
- Receiving yards: 779
- Return yards: 1,815
- Total touchdowns: 7
- Stats at Pro Football Reference

Johnnie Lee Higgins (born September 8, 1983) is an American former professional football player who was a wide receiver in the National Football League (NFL). He played college football for the UTEP Miners, earning first-team All-American honors in 2006. He was selected by the Oakland Raiders in the third round of the 2007 NFL draft. He was also a member of the Philadelphia Eagles and Virginia Destroyers.

== Early life ==
Higgins was born and raised in Sweeny and attended Sweeny High School in Sweeny, Texas, and was a student and a letterman in football, basketball, and track. In basketball, he was named his team's Most Valuable Player.

== College career ==
Higgins attended the University of Texas at El Paso to play football for the Miners. He received several honors, including Conference USA Special Teams Player of the Year in 2006.

== Professional career ==
Pre-draft measurables
Height	Weight	Arm length	Hand span	40-yard dash	10-yard split	20-yard split	20-yard shuttle	Three-cone drill	Vertical jump	Broad jump
5 ft 11 3/8 in (1.81 m)	186 lb (84 kg)	32 1/2 in (0.83 m)	9 3/8 in (0.24 m)	4.43 s	1.55 s	2.59 s	4.32 s	6.62 s	36.5 in (0.93 m)	10 ft 2 in (3.10 m)
All values from NFL Combine

=== Oakland Raiders ===
After turning in a 4.43 40-yard dash time at the 2007 NFL Scouting Combine, Higgins was selected by the Oakland Raiders in the third round (99th overall and the final pick of the first day) of the 2007 NFL draft. He became the team's starting punt returner and he returned a punt 90 yards for a touchdown in a preseason game against the Seattle Seahawks on August 30, 2007. He saw action in all 16 games in the 2007 season, starting in two of them at wide receiver.

He saw punt return action in the first three games, but it was in week 4 against the Denver Broncos in which Higgins made his first NFL reception. He caught two passes for 14 yards in the game. On special teams, Higgins recorded five tackles. In his final game of the season, he had a punt return for 54 yards, which set up fellow rookie JaMarcus Russell to throw his second touchdown of the season. Higgins finished his rookie year with six receptions for 47 yards, 20 punt returns for 103 yards, and five special teams tackles.

In the 2008 season, Higgins recorded more receiving yards than any other Raider wide receiver (tight end Zach Miller led the team in yards). He also returned punts for touchdowns in back-to-back games.

In the first game of the 2009 season, against San Diego, Higgins ran the ball one time for 19 yards.

=== Philadelphia Eagles ===
Higgins signed a one-year contract with the Philadelphia Eagles on July 29, 2011. He was released by the team on September 3 during final roster cuts.

== Personal life ==
He is the cousin of NFL cornerback Quentin Jammer.
