= Tracy Simien =

American football player and coach (born 1967)

No. 55, 54, 57
- Position: Linebacker

Personal information
- Born: May 21, 1967 (age 59); Bay City, Texas, U.S.
- Listed height: 6 ft 1 in (1.85 m)
- Listed weight: 252 lb (114 kg)

Career information
- High school: Sweeny
- College: TCU
- NFL draft: 1989: undrafted

Career history

Playing
- Pittsburgh Steelers (1989); New Orleans Saints (1990)*; Kansas City Chiefs (1990)*; Montreal Machine (1991); Kansas City Chiefs (1991–1997); San Diego Chargers (1999)
- * Offseason or practice squad member only

Coaching
- Cologne Centurions (Defensive line coach) (2005); Houston Texans (Assistant Defensive Line Coach) (2006); Cologne Centurions (Defensive line coach) (2007)

Awards and highlights
- First-team All-SWC (1988)

Career NFL statistics
- Tackles: 513
- Interceptions: 5
- Fumble recoveries: 8
- Stats at Pro Football Reference

Tracy Anthony Simien (born May 21, 1967) is an American former professional football player who was a linebacker in the National Football League (NFL). He played college football for the TCU Horned Frogs. He played eight seasons in the NFL, mainly for the Kansas City Chiefs.
