= List of University of North Carolina at Charlotte people =

This is a list of notable alumni and faculty of the University of North Carolina at Charlotte.

== Academia, science and technology ==
- Benjamin Chavis, civil rights activist, head of NAACP
- Greg Gbur, author and physicist
- Glenda Gilmore, Peter and C. Vann Woodward Professor of History, Yale University
- Lily "Appalachian" Gross, a member of the inaugural United States Women's Cyber Team
- Mohammad Ab Rahman, Chief of Defence, Malaysian Armed Forces (Computer Science 1982–1985)
- Jill S. Tietjen, electrical engineer and consultant
- Shane Wighton, engineer and YouTube personality for Stuff Made Here

== Architecture ==
- Bryan Cantley, visionary architect, academic (1987)
- Toby Witte, architect (2004)

== Arts and literature ==
- Jeffery Beam, poet (1975)
- Amanda Oleander, fine artist (2013)
- Caridad Svich, playwright

== Music ==
- Clay Aiken, singer, Broadway star, and 1st runner-up of the second season of American Idol
- Nicole Atkins, pop singer (2001)
- Seth Avett, musician, of The Avett Brothers (2002)
- Chris Lane, musician, of the Chris Lane Band
- The Moody Brothers, Grammy-nominated musicians
- Dave Moody, Dove Award-winning artist, producer, songwriter and indie filmmaker

== Athletics ==
- Eddie Basden, Chicago Bulls guard/forward (2005)
- Duggar Baucom, Citadel Bulldogs head basketball coach (1995)
- Calvin Brock, heavyweight boxer (1999)
- Jon Busch, Columbus Crew goalkeeper (1996)
- Cameron Clark, NFL player for the New York Jets
- Fieldin Culbreth, former Major League Baseball umpire
- Bayley Currey, NASCAR driver and engineer (2021)
- Jon Davis, professional basketball player for Hapoel Haifa of the Israeli Basketball Premier League
- Nate Davis, NFL player for the Tennessee Titans
- Floyd Franks, Chicago Fire midfielder (2006)
- Leemire Goldwire, professional basketball player (May 2008)
- Bryan Harvey, California Angels and Florida Marlins pitcher
- Alex Highsmith, NFL player for the Pittsburgh Steelers
- DeMarco Johnson, professional basketball player (1997)
- Bobby Lutz, Charlotte 49ers head basketball coach (1980)
- John Maine, New York Mets pitcher
- Cedric Maxwell, NBA great with the Boston Celtics and commentator (1983) (attended 1973–1977)
- Kelly Earnhardt Miller, NASCAR owner
- Benny Moss, UNC Wilmington head basketball coach (1992)
- Larry Ogunjobi, NFL player for the Cleveland Browns
- Joe Posnanski, national columnist at NBC Sports, New York Times best-selling author
- Layne Riggs, NASCAR driver
- Jordan Rinaldi, UFC fighter
- Donnie Smith, professional soccer player (2013–2018)
- Myatt Snider, NASCAR driver
- Melvin Watkins, head basketball coach at Charlotte and Texas A&M (1977)
- Rodney White, professional basketball player (2001)

== Business and law ==
- R. Andrew Murray, US Attorney for the Western District of North Carolina
- Robert A. Niblock, Lowe's Chairman, President, and CEO (1984)
- Anne Tompkins, former US Attorney for the Western District of North Carolina

== Politics and public life ==
- W. Ted Alexander, member of the North Carolina Senate
- Mike Davis, member of the California State Assembly (2006-2012)
- Dan Forest (1993), 34th Lieutenant Governor of North Carolina
- Richard Hudson (1996), U.S. Representative from North Carolina
- Cassanni Laville, Dominican politician, MP and cabinet minister
- Lillian M. Lowery, Superintendent of the Maryland State Department of Education
- Vickie Sawyer, member of the North Carolina Senate
- Michael Whatley, chairman of the Republican National Committee
- Dean Arp, member of the North Carolina House of Representatives and Senior Chairman of the House Appropriations Committee
- Addison McDowell, U.S. representative from North Carolina's 6th congressional district (2025–present)

== Miscellaneous ==
- Kimberly Clarice Aiken, Miss America 1994 (attended; did not graduate)
- Heather Childers, Fox News weekend anchor
- Chelsea Cooley, Miss USA 2005 (attended; did not graduate)
- Peter Jugis, 4th Bishop of the Diocese of Charlotte
- Joe Posnanski, 2011 NSSA Sportswriter of the Year
- Aimy Steele, Founder and CEO of the New North Carolina Project

== Notable UNC Charlotte faculty ==
=== Social science, arts and humanities ===
- Blaine E. Brownell, Director of the School of Architecture and author of the Transmaterial book series (2006-2017)
- Blair Rudes, professor of linguistics; re-created the extinct language of Virginian Algonquian for Terrence Malick's 2005 film The New World
- James D. Tabor, Religious Studies Chair, designated occult expert in the case of Waco, Texas; author of the international bestseller The Jesus Dynasty

=== Science, math and technology ===
- Vaughn Climenhaga, mathematician and distinguished professor
- Kathy Reichs, bestselling author; inspiration of the Fox television drama Bones
- Raphael Tsu, physicist known for his research in man-made quantum materials, superlattices, and quantum wells
