= SomaFM =

Internet radio station

- Type: Internet radio
- Founded: February 2000
- Headquarters: San Francisco, California, U.S.
- Key people: Rusty Hodge, Founder
- Website: SomaFM.com

SomaFM is a multi-channel Internet radio station supported with donations without advertisements. The station takes its name from Soma, the fictional drug from Aldous Huxley's 1932 novel Brave New World and the South of Market neighborhood of San Francisco, known colloquially as SoMa.

== History ==
SomaFM originally started broadcasting out of founder Rusty Hodge's basement garage in the Bernal Heights neighborhood of San Francisco, as a micropower radio station broadcast at the Burning Man festival in 1999. The response to the project was sufficiently positive that Rusty Hodge launched it as a full-time internet radio station in February 2000.

In May 2002, the Digital Millennium Copyright Act Copyright Arbitration Royalty Panel rate ruling came into effect, requiring internet broadcasters to pay a per song per listener royalty to SoundExchange for the performance of the sound recording, retroactively through October 1998. Hodge estimated that the channel could have been forced to pay over US$1,000 per day to continue operations. The royalty was later reduced by half, but that rate still would require payments by SomaFM that exceeded their revenues.

In June 2002, SomaFM ceased broadcasting. Hodge was one of several webcasters who testified before the U.S. Congress in 2002 in the hopes of reducing the royalty rate. Subsequently, Congress passed the Small Webcaster Settlement Act of 2002 (SWSA) on November 15, 2002, which enabled small webcasters to negotiate a lower rate with SoundExchange. SomaFM resumed broadcasting in late November 2002 under this new royalty structure.

In 2005, SomaFM partnered with Orban to begin streaming to 3GPP-compatible mobile devices, becoming one of the first internet broadcasters to support mobile streaming on 3G/EDGE networks. In June 2007, SomaFM participated in the "Internet Radio Day of Silence" in protest of the Copyright Royalty Board's decision at the time to raise royalty fees for internet radio stations.

In January 2013, SomaFM partnered with Aha by Harman International to make its content available via Aha apps in supported automobile dashboards. In 2014, SomaFM partnered with Qualcomm to include Allplay (part of the AllJoyn open source software framework) for wireless speakers in their mobile apps. Throughout its history, SomaFM, as well as its playlist curators, have been recognized with various awards and other honors.

== List of channels ==
Channel	Genre/theme	Year added
Drone Zone	Drone	2000
Groove Salad	Downtempo/chillout	2000
Secret Agent	Lounge/jazz with a 1960s spy theme	2000
Indie Pop Rocks!	Indie pop/indie rock	2002
cliqhop idm	Intelligent dance music	2002
Beat Blender	House/downtempo/chillout	2002
Boot Liquor	Americana	2003
The Trip	Classic trance/progressive trance. Formerly known as Tag's Trip.	2004
Xmas in Frisko (Note: Only available seasonally)	Eclectic Christmas-themed music	2005
Space Station Soma	Ambient space music	2006
Illinois Street Lounge	Lounge music	2006
Doomed	Industrial/dark ambient	2006
Sonic Universe	Avant-garde jazz	2008
Lush	Female-driven vocal downtempo	2008
Digitalis	Self-produced indie rock and electronic music	2008
Suburbs of Goa	Desi/Arabic-influenced worldbeat	2008
Underground 80s	Early 80s British synthpop and new wave. Formerly known as Nu Musik.	2008
Christmas Lounge	Christmas-themed lounge music	2008
Mission Control	Ambient music mixed with the sounds of NASA's mission broadcasts and live shuttle coverage	2009
PopTron	Electropop/dance-rock	2009
Covers	Cover songs	2009
Black Rock FM	The broadcast for 102.3FM in Black Rock City for the Burning Man Festival	2010
South by Soma	Music by artists from the SXSW Festival	2012
SF 10–33	Ambient music mixed with the sounds of San Francisco public safety radio traffic	2012
Dub Step Beyond	Dubstep and other bass-driven electronic music	2012
Folk Forward	Indie folk, alternate folk	2012
Christmas Rocks!	Christmas themed indie/alternative rock	2012
DEF CON Radio	Music from DEF CON's chill room, provided by SomaFM	2013
Iceland Airwaves	Music by artists from the Iceland Airwaves festival	2013
Deep Space One	Deep ambient electronic, experimental, and space music	2013
Seven Inch Soul	Classic soul music	2014
Left Coast 70s	Mellow album-oriented rock from the 1970s	2015
Fluid	Instrumental hip hop/future soul/liquid trap	2015
ThistleRadio	Celtic music, was previously broadcast as The Thistle & Shamrock on NPR	2015
Metal Detector	Heavy metal	2015
Jolly Ol' Soul	Christmas-themed soul music	2015
SomaFM Live	Live music (Note: Broadcasts live or previously live content from events. Started in 2015, and mainly rebroadcasts SomaFM's live content, including from San Francisco's How Weird Street Faire.)	2015
Groove Salad Classic	Early 2000s downtempo/chillout	2019
Department Store Christmas	Christmas-themed beautiful music	2019
Heavyweight Reggae	Reggae, dub, ska, and rocksteady	2020
Vaporwaves	Vaporwave	2020
n5MD Radio	Music from the music label n5MD	2020
Synphaera	Modern electronic ambient and space music	2021
The In-Sound	1960s & 1970s Euro-Pop	2023
Tiki Time	Exotica	2023
Bossa Beyond	Bossa Nova & Samba	2023
Chillits	Recordings of musical performances from Chillits	2024
