= Bryan Cantley =

American visionary architect and architectural theorist

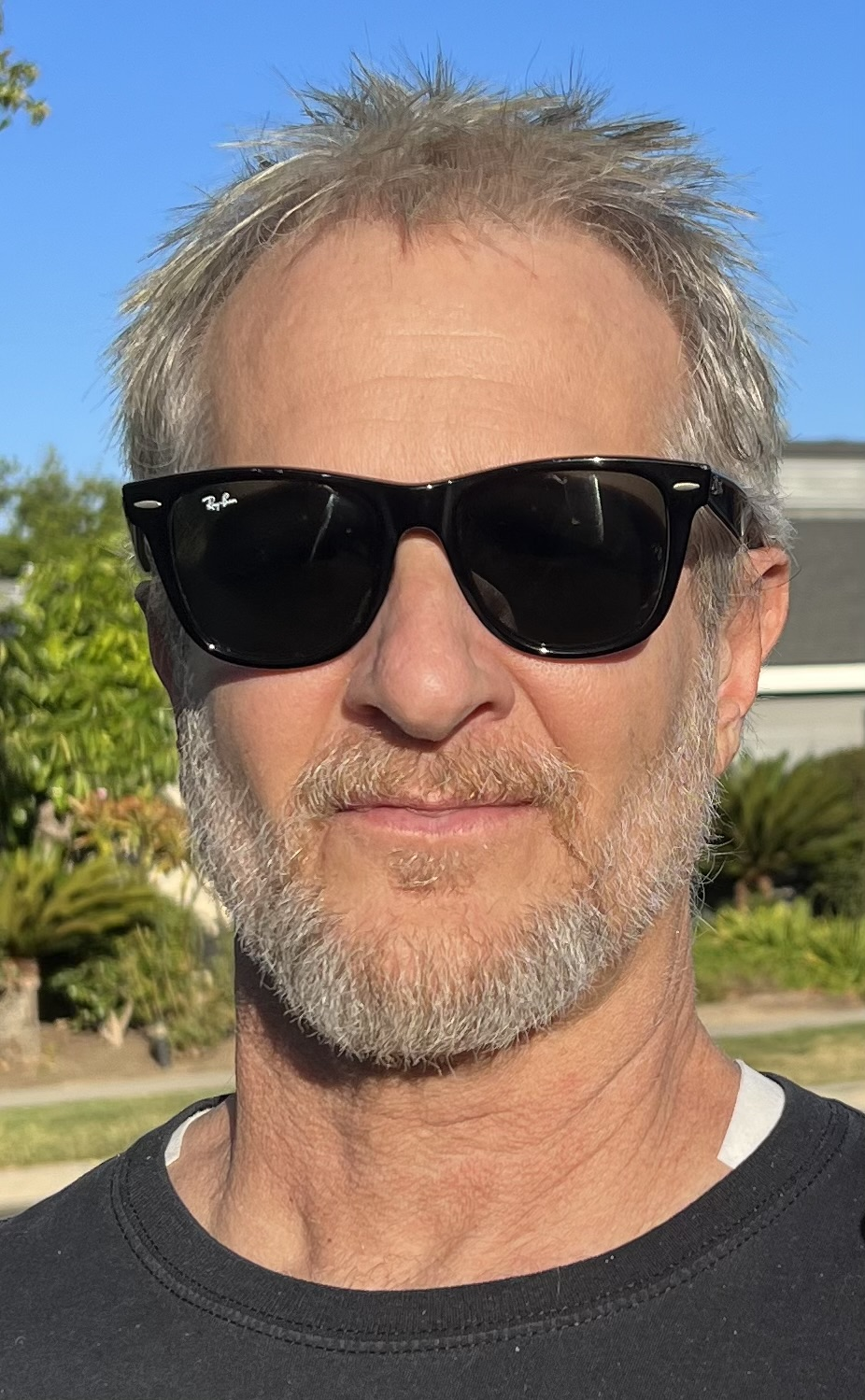
- Born: 1965 (age 60–61); Charleston, West Virginia, United States
- Education: University of North Carolina at Charlotte (B.Arch); University of California, Los Angeles (M.Arch)
- Occupations: Visionary architect, artist, educator
- Known for: Experimental architectural drawings; Mechudzu
- Awards: Graham Foundation Grant (2002) Ken Roberts Memorial Delineation Competition (KRob) Winner - The Award for Excellence in Process Visualization (2026) Winner - Juror Citation for Process Visualization (2026) Finalist - Process Visualization (2026)
- Practice: Form:uLA Dimension Laboratory

Bryan Cantley (born 1965) is an American visionary architect, artist, educator, and architectural theorist. He is a tenured professor in the Department of Visual Arts, College of the Arts, California State University, Fullerton.

Cantley’s work explores a conceptual framework he terms 'Mechudzu', which imagines architecture as a hybrid system combining mechanical infrastructures with biomorphic behavior.

In 1992, Cantley founded Form:uLA Dimension LAboratory as an experimental design studio to investigate architectural representation through drawings, diagrams, and theoretical spatial systems. Drawings and models from Form:uLA Dimension Laboratory are included in the collection of the San Francisco Museum of Modern Art.

== Early life and education ==
Cantley was born in Charleston, West Virginia, in 1965.

He received a Bachelor of Architecture from the University of North Carolina at Charlotte in 1987 and a Master of Architecture from the University of California, Los Angeles in 1990.

Cantley joined the faculty at California State University, Fullerton in 1992, where he has taught three-dimensional design and architectural theory.

== Form:uLA Dimension Laboratory ==
In a 2013 interview with Silvio Carta, architect and scholar in the field of design and architecture at the University of Hertfordshire, Cantley stated that he co-founded his practice in 1992 with Kevin O'Donnell under the name Synesis. O'Donnell left for a period, after which Cantley reformed the practice as Form:uLA; the two remained partners until around 2008. Since then, Cantley has been sole principal.

The studio investigates architectural systems through hybrid drawing techniques combining analog drafting methods such as ink and graphite with digital manipulation and collage. The work attempts to blur the boundary between architecture and its representation, proposing that drawings themselves may function as architectural environments rather than simply documentation of buildings.

Cantley’s conceptual system, which he refers to as "Mechudzu", forms a central component of this research. The framework merges architecture, mechanical systems, graphic notation, and narrative structures to produce drawings depicting speculative architectural machines and mechanical ecologies.

== Critical reception ==
Bryan Cantley's work has been critiqued and commented upon by other significant architects, architectural historians, and critics.

In her critique within Cantley's monograph, Mechudzu: New Rhetorics for Architecture, Architectural historian Dora Epstein-Jones opines about Cantley's work, "It 'reads' like architecture. It is architecture, certainly. There's structure and skin, volume and space, layers of architectural stuff. It's got to be architecture. And yet, it is both distant and immediate, tectonically nonsensical...hey, who says it can't do that?"

Neil Spiller, the architectural academic, author, and the editor of the journal Architectural Design (AD), has featured and critiqued Cantley's work in his books including Architecture and Surrealism: A Blistering Romance and Drawing Architecture and penned a dedicated analytical feature titled Magic Craftsmanship: A Glimpse into Bryan Cantley's Thirdspace in his 2018 guest-edited issue of Architectural Design (AD), Celebrating the Marvellous: Surrealism in Architecture. In Architecture and Surrealism he writes, "[Cantley's] structures scan, surf and superimpose information...his architecture is made from the paraphernalia that enables our human web of interconnections and interactions to exchange, classify and store the multidimensional web of digital transactions. Cantley refers to this as 'mechudzu', the digital and mechanical equivalent of its biological counterpart 'kudzu' - a plant that grows fast, penetrates and ungulfs and destroys...Cantley's virulent, tendril-like propositions are made of the same stuff as the city: steel, cable, sockets, conduits, signage. Like its kudzu namesake, it has no respect for established urban order."

Co-founder of Sci-Arc, Pritzker Laureate, and principal at the LA architectural firm Morphosis, Thom Mayne, penned the afterword for Cantley's monograph, Speculative Coolness: Architecture, Media, the Real, and the Virtual where he comments, "Pursuing an aesthetics of imperfection, Cantley advocates for an architecture that favors questions over answers, improvisation over composition, contingency over certainty, and openings over closure."

Art and architecture critic, Aaron Betsky, reviewed Cantley's work in Speculative Coolness, saying, "For decades, Bryan Cantley has been coolly speculating about architecture that surfs through the suburbs with expressive technology. His beautifully layered drawings, combining computer generation with the craft of hand delineation, manage to evoke without designating, and are in themselves objects of architecture. This book collects some of his best work in an accessible and seductive manner."

New Zealand based American architect, academic, and architecture critic, Daniel K. Brown wrote a full book review of Speculative Coolness that appeared in the May/June 2023 issue of Architecture Now. He comments, "Within each of Cantley’s drawings, our eyes are ‘drawn’ along sight/site lines that shift scales and temporal conditions, reorienting while recontextualising symbols, notations and mnemonic devices. Our normative perception of an architectural drawing loses its footing; we are forced to reconceptualise architectural representation — and, indeed, the architectural discipline — as a convergence of historical, cultural, political, allegorical and temporal domains. Pentimento and palimpsest converge; smudged graphite meets pixel; compositional torque establishes rotational shifts; and the static becomes dynamic."

Cantley is a featured architect in Nalina Moses' 2019 book, Single-Handedly: Contemporary Architects Draw by Hand, where she comments, "Using unorthodox drafting techniques, Bryan Cantley fashions a personal architectural language of unorthodox forms that evoke both animals and machines...This unsettled architecture is charged with kinetic energy. Though the structures are enmeshed with the grid below, often pinned to it with a field of column like supports, they move defiantly against it."

== Exhibitions, lectures and collections ==
Cantley’s drawings and models have been exhibited internationally. In 2001 the San Francisco Museum of Modern Art acquired a group of drawings and models from Form:uLA for its architecture and design collection.

- "Dirty Geometries + Mechanical Imperfections" Exhibit, SCI-Arc in 2014
- "Postliminal Fuzz" Lecture for Hawksmoor International Lecture Series, University of Greenwich, London in 2016
- "Classificationing" Lecture for Bartlett International Lecture Series, Bartlett School of Architecture, London in 2017
- "Building Drawings" Exhibit, Woodbury University in 2018
- "Speculative Coolness" Lecture at UCLA in 2023

== Publications ==
Two monographs of Bryan Cantley’s work have been published:

- Mechudzu: New Rhetorics for Architecture (SpringerWein, 2011)
- Speculative Coolness: Architecture, Media, the Real, and the Virtual (Routledge, 2023)

Bryan Cantley has been a featured contributor in Architectural Design (AD)

- Drawing Strength From Machinery (Vol 78.5, 2008)
- Drawing Architecture (Vol 83.5, 2013)
- Reimagining Architectural Drawing: Print and Process (Vol 95.3, 2026)

== Awards ==
- Graham Foundation Grant (2023)
- Research Institute for Experimental Architecture (RIEA) Book Series Award for Mechudzu
- UNC Charlotte College of Arts and Architecture Distinguished Alumni (2024)
- Ken Roberts Memorial Delineation Competition (KRob)
  - (2016)
    - Winner - Juror Citation for Professional Hand Delineation
  - (2026)
    - Winner - The Award for Excellence in Process Visualization
    - Winner - Juror Citation for Process Visualization
    - Finalist - Process Visualization

== See also ==
- Lebbeus Woods
- Daniel Libeskind
- Archigram
- Thom Mayne
