= Aimy Steele =

American nonprofit executive

- Born: Aimy Shantel La'Nae Steele; 1978 or 1979 (age 46–47)
- Education: University of North Carolina at Charlotte (BA, MEd, PhD)
- Known for: Founder of New North Carolina Project
- Political party: Democratic
- Spouse: Michael Steele
- Children: 5

Aimy Shantel La'Nae Steele (born 1978 or 1979) is an American businesswoman, nonprofit executive, and former educator who is the founder and CEO of the New North Carolina Project. A member of the Democratic Party, she was a candidate for the North Carolina General Assembly in 2018 and 2020.

== Early life and education ==
Aimy Shantel La'Nae Steele was raised in a military family and lived in Japan during part of her childhood.

Steele graduated with her bachelor's degree in Spanish language from the University of North Carolina at Charlotte. She later earned her master's degree in school administration and a Doctor of Philosophy in curriculum and instruction from the University of North Carolina at Charlotte.

== Career ==
Steele worked as a teacher for over 10 years and was the principal of Beverly Hills Elementary School from 2014 to 2018.

Steele began her real estate career in 2005, starting as a broker for Prudential Real Estate. She is a realtor and developer in North Carolina. She is also the CEO of Reach Consulting, a test preparation company.

In 2018 and 2020, Steele was the Democratic nominee for the 82nd district of the North Carolina House of Representatives, narrowly losing both elections. She conducted most of her second campaign virtually, due to the COVID-19 pandemic.

After her time as a candidate, Steele became active in local politics and founded the Black Political Caucus in Cabarrus County. She is credited with helping elect five Black representatives in the county's government.

During the 2024 presidential election, Steele worked for the Harris campaign in North Carolina; focusing on Black and Hispanic voter outreach.

=== New North Carolina Project ===
In 2021, Steele founded the New North Carolina Project; a nonprofit organization that works to register and turnout voters regardless of party. The project was modeled after voter mobilization efforts like the New Georgia Project.

== Awards ==
Steele won the "Emerging Leader in the Social Justice/Community Advocacy" category of the 2024 EQUALibrium Awards by WFAE.

== Personal life ==
Steele is Baptist and fluent in Spanish. She is married to Michael Steele, a pastor. They have five children and live in Concord, North Carolina.
