= Kadida Kenner =

American nonprofit executive

- Born: Kadida N. Kenner
- Education: Temple University
- Known for: Founder of the New Pennsylvania Project
- Political party: Democratic

Kadida N. Kenner is an American nonprofit executive, voting rights activist, and political contributor who is the founder and CEO of the New Pennsylvania Project.

== Early life and education ==
Kenner was born in Pittsburgh and raised in West Chester, Pennsylvania, where she met Rosa Parks as a teenager during Black History Month. She graduated from Temple University with a bachelor's degree.

== Career ==
Kenner was a director, producer, and writer for HBCU sports television programming. She worked in live and scripted television in Charlotte, North Carolina, and Atlanta, Georgia for ESPNU.

During the 2016 presidential election, Kenner worked for the Clinton campaign as a campaign organizer in Charlotte. She became involved in political advocacy after returning to Pennsylvania in 2017. She worked as director of campaigns for the PA Budget and Policy Center, testifying before the Pennsylvania Senate in support of raising the minimum wage in January 2021.

In 2022, Kenner criticized Pennsylvania's political candidates for failing to deliver for Black Americans, saying: "They ask for our vote, and then we don't see them again."

In 2023, Kenner travelled across Pennsylvania to advocate for judges "associated with the left" during the that years elections.

Kenner is an opinion contributor for the Pennsylvania Capital-Star. She was named to the 2024 Black Trailblazers list by City & State. In 2024, she was named to the "150 Most Influential People in Philly" by Philadelphia.

Kenner serves as co-chair of Why Courts Matter – Pennsylvania, an advocacy campaign seeking to protect judicial independence in the Commonwealth of Pennsylvania. She has been active campaigning for the Democratic judges running for election and retention in the 2025 Pennsylvania elections.

=== New Pennsylvania Project ===
In 2021, Kenner founded the New Pennsylvania Project; a nonprofit organization that works to register and turnout voters regardless of party, with a focus on people of color and young people. The project was modeled after voter mobilization efforts like the New Georgia Project. As of 2025, the organization has 65 part-time staff workers across the state.

== Personal life ==
Kenner lives in Philadelphia, Pennsylvania.
