= Stanley Wisniewski =

American copyright judge

Stanley C. Wisniewski is an American copyright royalty judge specializing in economics.

He is currently serving a term of four years, subject to reappointment to additional six-year terms. Dr. Wisniewski has more than thirty years of experience as an economist, attorney, entrepreneur, educator, arbitrator, and manager. He has served as an expert economic witness in federal courts and before private arbitration panels. He has also prepared and presented expert testimony before several committees of the United States Senate and House of Representatives.

As an attorney, he has represented a variety of clients in litigation, arbitration, and administrative proceedings requiring substantial legal, economic, and financial expertise. He has served for more than twenty years on the AAA list of commercial arbitrators dealing with domestic and international cases involving contract disputes with respect to employment contract terms, partnership agreements, franchise arrangements, and government contracts with concessionaires. Dr. Wisniewski, who earned a Ph.D. in economics from the Catholic University of America and a J.D. from the University of Maryland School of Law, has published widely in academic and professional journals.

He has served as vice-chair of the certification and review committee and member of the governing board of Central Maryland Health Systems Agency; as a member of the Montgomery County Commission on Aging; as a member of 1999-2000 Governor's Task Force on Regulatory Reform in the State of Maryland; and was appointed by the governor to a six-year term as a member of the Maryland State Banking Board in July 2000."
