= Fiona Ritchie =

Scottish radio broadcaster (born 1960)

Fiona Ritchie MBE
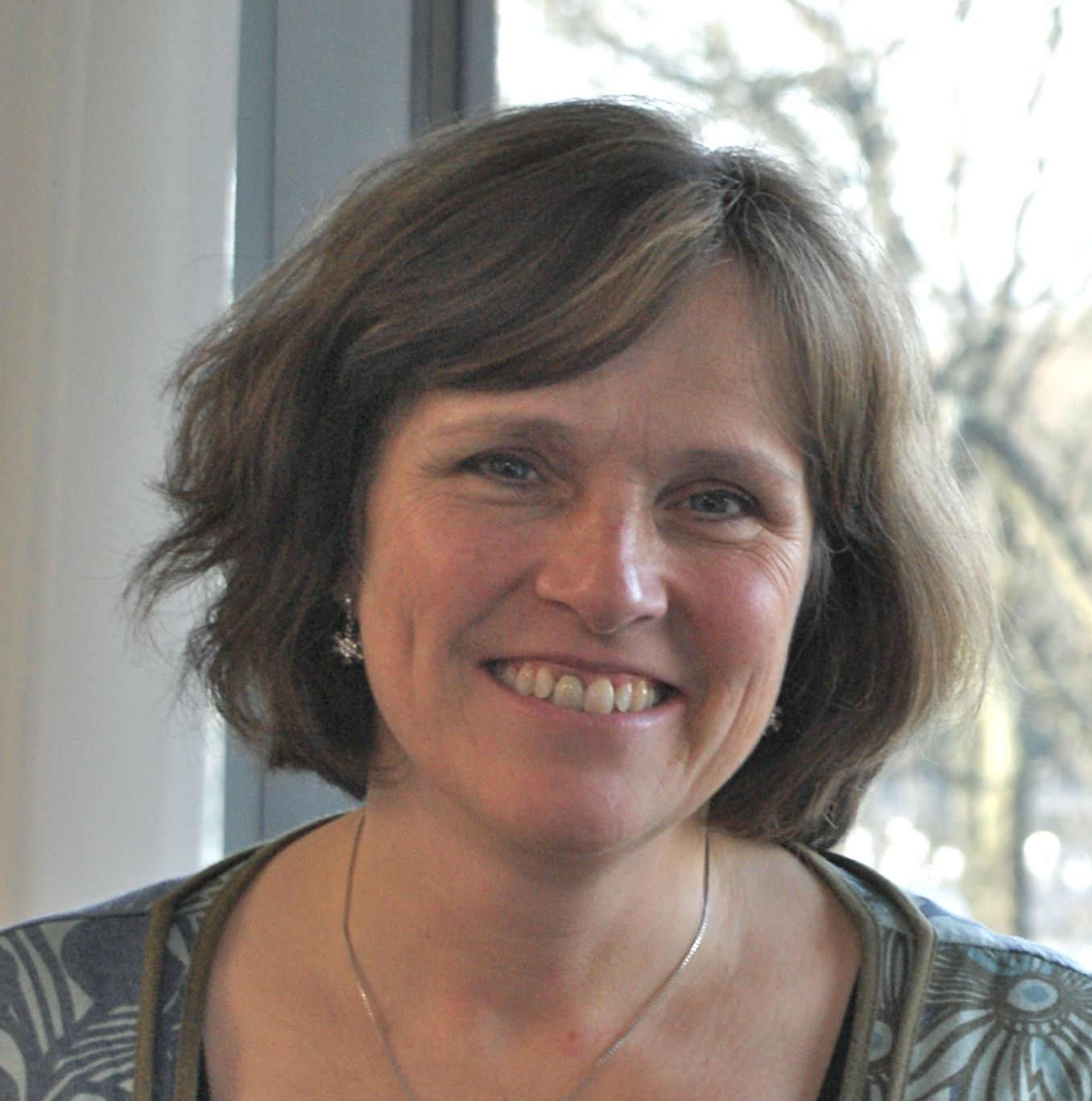
- Ritchie in 2011
- Born: 1960 (age 65–66)
- Presenting career
- Show: The Thistle & Shamrock
- Station: NPR
- Country: Scotland
- Website: thistleradio.com

Fiona Karen Ritchie MBE (born 1960) is a Scottish radio broadcaster of The Thistle & Shamrock, a weekly, Celtic music program for 40 years on National Public Radio (NPR). She curates ThistleRadio, a 24/7 web-based Celtic music channel. She was the co-author of The New York Times Best Seller Wayfaring Strangers.

The Celtic radio program has won awards since its inception in 1981 featuring Ritchie's "soft Scots" dialect.

== Early years ==
Ritchie was born and raised in Scotland, where she went to the University of Stirling. While at university, she was invited to spend a semester in North Carolina, which was when she first heard NPR. After graduating, she returned to North Carolina and, she was hired by WFAE FM, the NPR station in Charlotte, to oversee fundraising and promotion.

In 1981 Ritchie began a weekly hour of Celtic music. The Thistle & Shamrock was picked up for national broadcast within two years. Ritchie visited radio stations presenting live broadcasts and events, and in 1989 and 1990, travelled to 22 US cities with The Thistle & Shamrock Concert Tour.

== Return to Scotland ==
Ritchie re-settled in Scotland. She has visited and raised funds for NPR member stations and hosted Wolf Trap National Park for the Performing Arts to Chicago's Grant Park.

In the UK, Fiona Ritchie has presented programs for BBC Radio Scotland and BBC Radio 2, launching the Radio Scotland world music series "Celtic Connections" in 1993. She has produced and presented live concert performances and broadcasts, including a musical event for Prince Charles in 2001 at Holyrood Palace in Edinburgh, and she has acted on the Scottish advisory committee for the British Council.

In 2006, Ritchie launched Thistlepod, a free podcast from NPR. Her partnership with NPR Music gave rise to ThistleRadio in 2012, a 24/7 web-based Celtic music channel, later hosted by SomaFM internet radio.

In 2014 her book, Wayfaring Strangers: The Musical Voyage from Scotland and Ulster to Appalachia was published by UNC Press. The book was co-authored by Doug Orr with a foreword by Dolly Parton.

The Thistle and Shamrock ended in September 2024.

== Awards and honours ==
Ritchie's has six World Medals from the New York Festivals International Competition for Radio Programming, and a Flora Macdonald Award from St. Andrews University (North Carolina), which also conferred upon her the degree of honorary doctorate. Hundreds of Thistle & Shamrock tapes and vinyl albums are in the Scottish Heritage Center at St. Andrews University (North Carolina). Ritchie served on the Advisory Board of the Swannanoa Gathering folk arts workshops at Warren Wilson College in North Carolina.

In 2003 the Smithsonian Center for Folklife and Cultural Heritage honoured her for "creating an on-air community, serving as a musical ambassador,...”

Ritchie was appointed Member of the Order of the British Empire (MBE) in the 2014 Birthday Honours for services to broadcasting and traditional Scottish music. In 2016 she received the Hamish Henderson Award for Services to Traditional Music. Upon receiving this honour, Ritchie was also inducted into Scottish Traditional Music Hall of Fame.

Ritchie's ThistleRadio music channel on SomaFM was awarded Best Music Show: Country/Folk/Blues in the 2017 Online Radio Awards presented by the British streaming service Mixcloud. In 2018, Folk Alliance International inducted Ritchie into their Folk DJ Hall of Fame.
