= LPL =

LPL may refer to:

== Organizations ==
- Lambeth Palace Library, of the Church of England
- LG Display, a South Korean LCD panel maker, NYSE symbol
- London Public Library, Ontario, Canada
- LPL Financial, US broker and dealer
- Luxembourgish Patriot League, WWII resistance movement
- Lycée Prince de Liège, a Belgian school in Kinshasa, DRC

== Science ==
- Lipoprotein lipase, an enzyme that hydrolyzes lipids
- Lunar and Planetary Laboratory, Tucson, Arizona, USA
- Lipoate–protein ligase, an enzyme

== Sports ==
- Lanka Premier League, a Twenty20 cricket league
- League of Legends Pro League, top level of professional League of Legends in China

== Other uses ==
- LPL / Large Positive Lock, a lens mount used on Arri cameras and lenses
- Lucent Public License, an open-source license
- LockPickingLawyer, an American YouTuber
- London Property Letter, UK
- Liverpool John Lennon Airport, UK (by IATA airport code)
- Lease-a-Plane International, Northbrook, Illinois, USA (by ICAO airline code)
