= Greater Georgia Action, Inc. =

American conservative voter-engagement organization

Greater Georgia (legally Greater Georgia Action, Inc.) is a conservative voter-registration and engagement organization in the U.S. state of Georgia, founded in February 2021 by former U.S. Senator Kelly Loeffler and widely described as the Republican counterpart to Stacey Abrams's Fair Fight Action and New Georgia Project. Launched weeks after Loeffler lost the January 2021 U.S. Senate runoff and initially funded from her own money, the group set out to register conservative-leaning Georgians, expand Republican outreach to Black, Latino, Asian American, and women voters, and promote confidence in the state's elections.

The organization has run registration drives and year-round engagement between election cycles, and a report it released argued that Republican ground-game efforts and Georgia's new voting law were central to the party's 2022 wins. It also drew attention in April 2022 when Loeffler accused Atlanta Public Schools of allowing a Democratic-aligned group to hold a voter-registration event at a high school while denying one to Greater Georgia. Loeffler was later confirmed as Administrator of the Small Business Administration in February 2025.
