= Get Your Booty to the Poll =

American public service announcement

Get Your Booty to the Polls (GYBTTP) was an American political public service announcement. The campaign targeted Black men who patronize strip clubs, encouraging them to get out the vote during the 2020 United States presidential election and the Georgia special election. The campaign featured videos of exotic dancers encouraging people to vote by explaining the impact voting has in local communities and how to complete a voting ballot.

== Background ==
The campaign was directed by Angela Barnes and produced by Paul Fox. Barnes did not feel comfortable attending George Floyd-related protests due to being uncomfortable with crowds. She also was out of work due to the COVID-19 pandemic. Therefore, Barnes sought out another way to be engaged in political and systemic change, because "I needed to do something because my children’s lives — it feels like my children's lives are in danger…They're Black boys in a country that has no values for Black men, so I don’t want them to grow up in a country that doesn't serve them." Mondale Robinson of the Black Male Voter Project engaged in the process, helping to create the messages and focus on Black male voters. The initial video was funded by a GoFundMe campaign.

The first video was released in September 2020, before the 2020 United States presidential election. It was later repurposed for the Georgia run-off election slated for January 2021. The success of the first video led to the New Georgia Project funding a second ad explaining how to fill out a voting ballot.

== Concept ==
GYBTTP videos target Black male voters who patronize Atlanta's strip clubs and are influenced by strip club culture.

The first GYBTTP video was nonpartisan and was filmed in one day in July in Atlanta. The crew consisted entirely of volunteers. The one minute and 30 second video features five Black women exotic dancers pole dancing and explaining why voting is important to the Black community and how local elections directly impact the lives of community members. Examples cited in the video include how voting for district attorney could decide "if they go after dirty cops"; how abolishing cash bail depends on who is voted into office as sheriff; and encouraging voters to vote for school board members to help prepare students for high wage, high demand jobs. The soundtrack is a hip hop backtrack with a male voice saying "Get your booty to the poll."

The second video explained how to fill out a voting ballot. The video starts as a black and white retro, 1950s-style instructional video. Dancers wearing vintage-style dresses explain how to fill out a voting ballot using a giant fake ballot.

Many of the women in the campaigns were never involved in politics prior to the campaign. The dancers include:

- Jenny Gang, dancer at the Ivory in Atlanta.
- Zippora Lewis, competitive pole dancer and teacher.
- Coy Malone, vegan chef, computer scientist and exotic dancer at Magic City.
- Nikki St. John, novelist, activist and dancer at the Ivory in Atlanta.

== Response ==
GYBTTP went viral upon initial release in September 2020, receiving over 3.3 million views. The video led to participating dancers getting speaking engagements at community events, including a car show organized by the local Movement for Black Lives chapter. Dancers also field election-related questions via social media.

Jasmine Johnson, activist, educator, porn performer, and therapist praised the campaign for taking the objectification of Black women's bodies and "utilizing it to empower others, to get people’s attention on their own terms.”

The Black Sex Workers Collective opposed the campaign. Founder MF Akynos states that "It does not get to the root of the problem" regarding racism in the United States and the shame and blame surrounding marginalized people who chose not to vote. Others criticized the videos for perpetuating stereotypes of Black people and assuming all Black men like strippers or visit strip clubs.
