= Chillits =

Outdoor music party in California, US

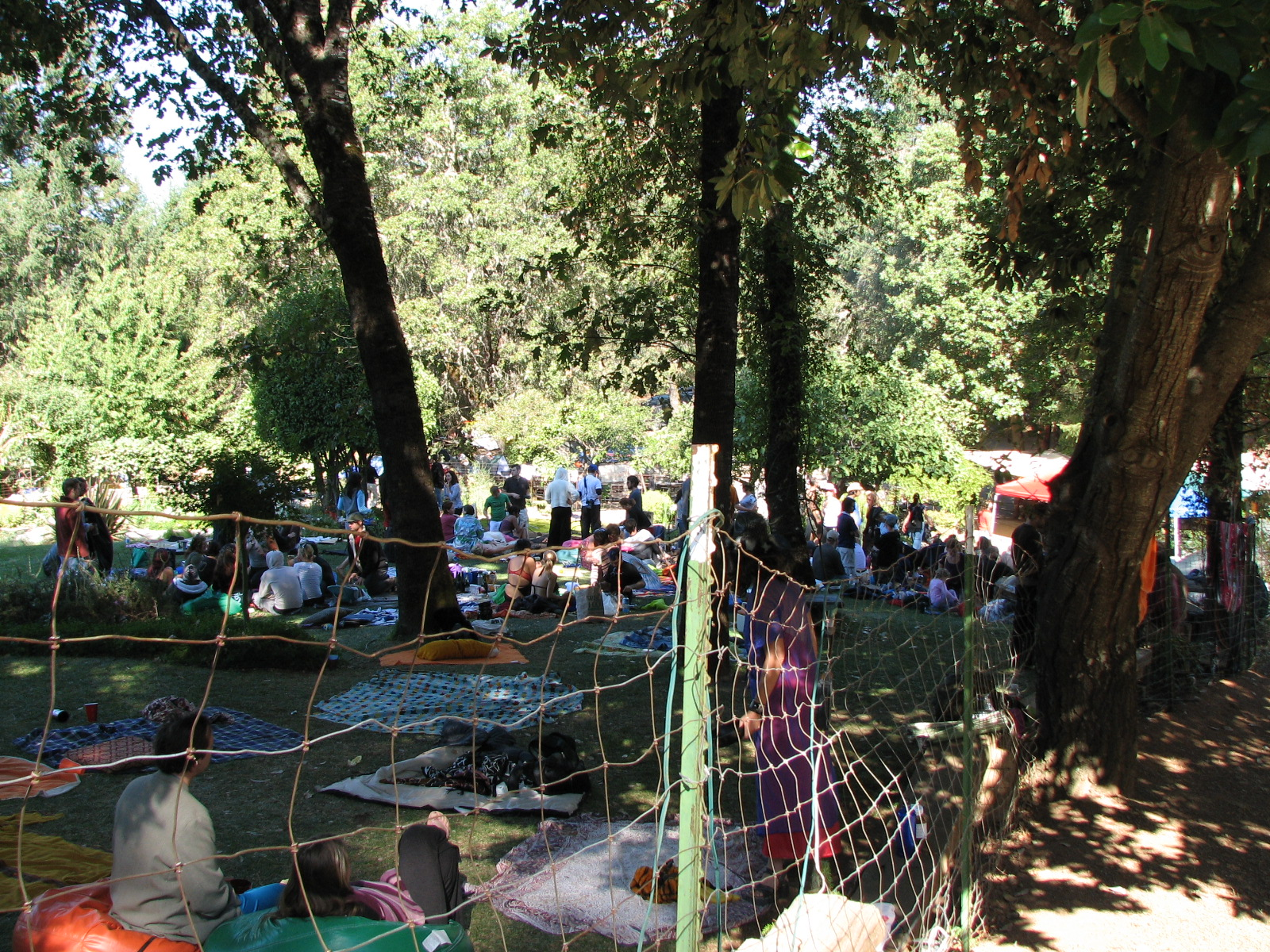
- Genre: Ambient music
- Location: California
- Years active: 1999–present
- Founders: Cloud Factory
- Website: www.chillits.org

Chillits is an annual ambient music weekend-long outdoor party, usually held every September, starting in 1999. From then through 2009, it was held at a private retreat center near Willits, California, US, and at an alternate location in Plymouth, California, US, from 2010 to 2012. In 2013, it was held on private property in Lake County, California, and then returned to Willits in 2014 at another private retreat center. The event later moved to the private Camp Winnarainbow venue at Wavy Gravy's Hog Farm at the Black Oak Ranch outside of Laytonville, California, where it returned to in 2022 after a hiatus due to the pandemic. There is one main sound stage, with music playing almost continuously through the weekend by many DJs and, occasionally, live musicians. Attendance is limited to a few hundred people. It was started by the Cloud Factory community, then expanded and took on a unique character.

== Music ==
Most of the DJs and live musicians who play at Chillits could be considered amateur, in the sense that they do not attempt to make a living from playing music but instead donate their time and services. Some are San Francisco Bay Area technologists, including Brian Behlendorf. Starting with the 2000 gathering, many of the sets have been recorded and made available for free online (see links below).

In 2003, Mixmaster Morris performed at the event, and subsequently mentioned the campout in a BBC documentary later that same year. Following Morris's visit, additional recognition was garnered amongst the Internet community, resulting in the listing of music sets from Chillits on Boing Boing. Other notable visiting acts include Black Sifichi, Lena, Robert Leiner, Gamelan Anak Swarasanti, Safety Scissors, Wobbly, Quiet American, Jonah Sharp, and Balearic Mike.

== Attendance ==
Due to the size of the venue, attendance at Chillits has always been extremely limited. The information sheet distributed with tickets says "Every year, the Chillits organizers agonize for months over how to distribute tickets so that everyone who wants to can attend. And every year, some good folks miss out. It's an obvious quandary: if we sold thousands of tickets then everyone could go, but we'd quickly lose the comfortable, laid-back vibe that makes Chillits so popular."

Ticket distribution is largely based on participation: collective members and others who involve themselves in the responsibilities and tasks made necessary by the planning and execution of the event are awarded the right to buy a pair of tickets. Basically, if you work it, you can attend. This work includes but is not limited to set-up and clean-up shifts, meal shifts, DJ/performance slots, door and parking shifts, equipment responsibilities, coordinator shifts, etc. There is a lottery system designed such that anyone who wants to attend may put their name in for a chance to get tickets, as well as a mailing list that facilitates the buying and selling of unneeded tickets, between private parties, up until the event begins. Few similar events have been created, despite the availability of this and other similar venues across the land, despite the obvious demand.

== Recordings ==
To commemorate the 25th anniversary of Chillits, all historical recordings were compiled together for a 24/7 online radio station, hosted by SomaFM.

- sets from 2024
- sets from 2023
- sets from 2022
- sets from 2017
- sets from 2016
- sets from 2015
- sets from 2013
- sets from 2009
- sets from 2008
- sets from 2007
- sets from 2006 (only a few were successfully recorded)
- sets from 2005 – Boing Boing review
- sets from 2004 – Boing Boing review
- sets from 2003
- sets from 2002
- sets from 2001
- sets from 2000
- the first year was not recorded, and/or some of the later the recordings are not available

== See also ==
- List of electronic music festivals
