= Micropower radio =

Micropower radio is a subset of pirate radio concerned with low-power radio broadcasting, usually less than about 100 watts radiated power and sometimes less than 0.1 watt. Micropower radio transmits to a number of recipients ("listeners" or "viewers") that belong to a small local group. Beginning in the early 1990s, there has been an increase in micropower radio because of the desire for such a service in local communities. Micropower radio gives an avenue for small groups and individuals to provide local neighborhood or community broadcasts of information, diverse programming, and entertainment. Micropower radio is usually a non-commercial service.

The Micro Radio Movement in the United States aims to change radio licensing laws. While never his intent to found a movement, Mbanna Kantako, founder of the Human Rights Radio Network, is often referred to as the founder or grandfather of the Micro Radio Movement.

In the US, the Federal Communications Commission (FCC) requires AM/FM radio and TV stations without a Low Power FM (LPFM) license to transmit with at least 6,000 watts of power. The FCC is not currently offering any LPFM licenses. This makes the cost of setting up a radio station prohibitive for individuals and small communities.

== Sources ==
Free Radio, Electronic Civil Disobedience by Lawrence Soley
