= New Pennsylvania Project =

Voter registration and mobilization nonprofit

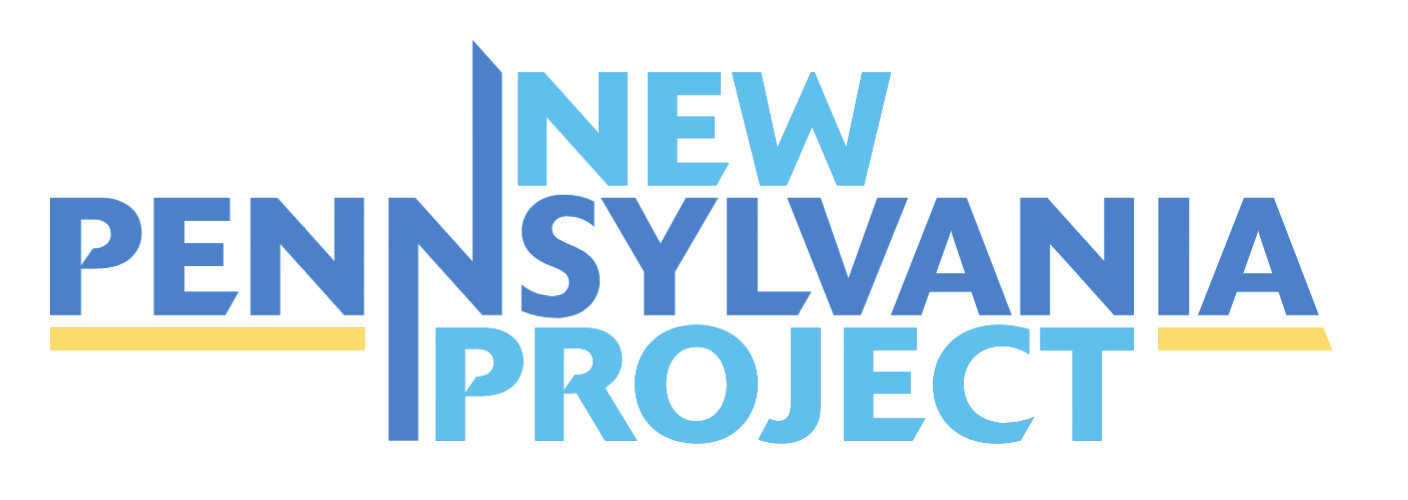
- Formation: 2021
- Type: Nonprofit (501(c)4)
- Purpose: Voter registration Voting rights protection
- Headquarters: Lemoyne
- Region served: Pennsylvania
- Founder & CEO: Kadida Kenner
- Website: newpaproject.org

The New Pennsylvania Project works to register voters regardless of party, with a focus on people of color and young people. In addition to voter engagement, the organization also has a major focus on voting rights. The organization applauded the switch to automatic voter registration in 2023 in Pennsylvania, and expressed concern that efforts to make voting more difficult endangers American democracy.

The organization claims to have registered over 20,000 voters ahead of the 2022 midterms, and 40,000 voters as of May 1, 2024.

The project was founded in 2021 and modeled after voter mobilization efforts like the New Georgia Project. Kadida Kenner is the CEO.

In December 2024, the district attorney of Delaware County, Jack Stollsteimer, announced that a paid staffer for the New Pennsylvania Project used an app to register 324 people for the 2024 election, of which 129 were not successful. The staffer, Jennifer Hill, was arrested on felony forgery, public records tampering, and voter registration-related charges for fraudulently registering dead people, including her own father.

== See also ==
- 2024 United States presidential election in Pennsylvania
- New North Carolina Project
