= New North Carolina Project =

Voter registration and voting rights nonprofit

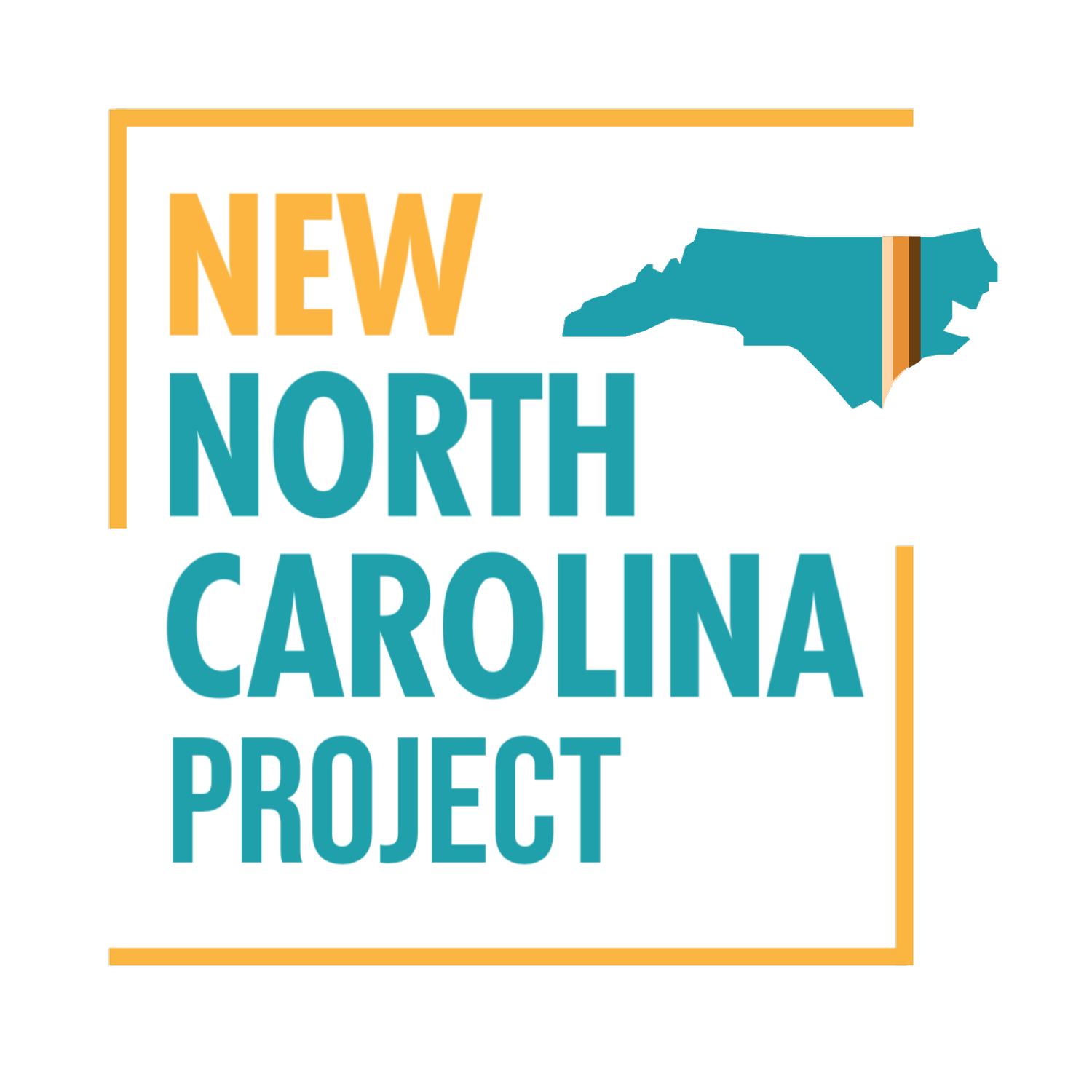
- Formation: 2021
- Type: Nonprofit (501(c)4)
- Purpose: Voter registration Voting rights protection
- Region served: North Carolina
- Founder & CEO: Aimy Steele
- Website: Official website

The New North Carolina Project works to register and turnout voters regardless of party. The organization also speaks out against misinformation online and other forms of voter suppression and intimidation. It also tries to counteract those efforts and a disillusionment with politics reach potential voters by making calls and organizing volunteers. The project, for example, hosted a number of events to engage HBCU students on the first day of early voting in 2022. They also hired a Native American engagement director in 2021. The group hopes to close the turnout gap between white voters and voters of color.

The project was modeled after voter mobilization efforts like the New Georgia Project. Aimy Steele, a former educator, founded the project in 2021. The Project had hired 20 staff but by April 2023, had to lay off all staff and return to being run by five volunteers unless more funding arrives. This lack of funding is credited to North Carolina not being seen in 2022 and 2023 as competitive of a swing state to the degree of swing states like Georgia as well as the long gaps in funding between election cycles.

== Awards ==
Steele won Emerging Leader in the Social Justice/Community Advocacy category of the 2024 EQUALibrium Awards by WFAE.

== See also ==
- 2024 United States presidential election in North Carolina
- Cost of Voting Index
- New Pennsylvania Project
