= The Thistle & Shamrock =

Weekly American radio program

- Genre: Celtic music, folk
- Running time: c. 50 min
- Country of origin: United States
- Language: English
- Syndicates: National Public Radio
- Hosted by: Fiona Ritchie
- Created by: Fiona Ritchie
- Produced by: Fiona Ritchie
- Recording studio: Perthshire, Scotland and Charlotte, North Carolina
- Original release: 1981 – 2024
- Audio format: Stereophonic
- Website: thistleradio.com
- Podcast: Podcast/RSS Feed

The Thistle & Shamrock was a weekly American syndicated radio program, named after the national emblems of Scotland and Ireland, specializing in Celtic music. It is heard on 380 National Public Radio (NPR) stations, and is available internationally on WorldSpace via NPR Worldwide; according to NPR, Thistle is the most listened-to Celtic music program in the world. It has been produced and hosted by Scottish native Fiona Ritchie since its inception in 1981.

The show's final episode aired on September 30, 2024.

== Background ==
Thistle began at WFAE, a newly established NPR affiliate in Charlotte, North Carolina. At the time it went on the air in 1981, WFAE was licensed to the University of North Carolina at Charlotte (UNCC) and Ritchie was working as a volunteer, having returned there after spending a semester in 1980 there as a teaching assistant. Being a new enterprise in need of programming, WFAE invited Ritchie to create a program of Celtic music. It originally aired only locally, but became popular enough that it was picked up nationally on June 4, 1983.

Thistle features traditional music, the singer-songwriter genre, and the Celtic music contribution to world music. In-studio guests comment on the music and contribute exclusive content, including NPR's first mp3 music download and live festival recordings.

In the summer of 1990, Ritchie returned to Scotland where she continued to produce the program for NPR.

Although WFAE is no longer licensed to UNCC and has switched to a mostly news-talk format, the Charlotte station continued to carry Thistle as one of its few music programs for several years.

On September 30, 2024, Ritchie will discontinue the weekly series to devote time to other projects; she has not ruled out continuing to produce special programs after that.

== Related products ==
Ritchie has also produced several CD compilations of Celtic music, and authored a volume on Celtic music for the "NPR Curious Listener's Guide" book series, published in 2005. In 2006, Ritchie launched Thistlepod, a free podcast from NPR featuring new-releases from Celtic roots. In 2013, Ritchie launched Thistle Radio, featuring the classics of Celtic music. In May 2015, Thistle Radio moved from NPR to internet based radio station SomaFM.
