= Copyright Arbitration Royalty Panel =

American copyright agency

The Copyright Arbitration Royalty Panel (CARP) was established in 1993, as a part of the United States Congress involved in making decisions regarding copyright royalties, replacing the Copyright Royalty Tribunal (CRT). In 2004 it was replaced by the Copyright Royalty Board (CRB).

== Panel function ==
The panel was created upon the suggestion of the Register of Copyrights, and was sanctioned to appoint and organize copyright, arbitration, and royalty panels. The primary purpose of the panel was to make decisions involving the adjustment of copyright royalty rates as well as the terms and payments of royalties that fall under copyright law.

When determining the reasonable royalty rates, the Copyright Arbitration Royalty Panel was required to balance the decision to make the creative works accessible to the public, to grant the copyright holder a fair reward for the work, and to minimize any disruptive effects the industries involved or associated with the copyright holder and user.

== Distribution Reform Act of 2004 ==
The Copyright Arbitration Royalty Panel was phased out by the Copyright Royalty and Distribution Reform Act of 2004, which amended chapter 8 of the U.S. Copyright Act in its entirety. Under the new system, three Copyright Royalty Judges, also known as CRJs, establish the conditions and rates for (compulsory) copyright statutory licenses, and govern the distribution system of royalties collected by the Copyright office on these statutory licenses.

The CRJ appointees will serve for a full-time six-year term with the possibility for reappointment. In order to avoid replacing all three judges at the same time, the first three judges appointed will serve staggered terms of two, four, and six years.
