= Daniel K. Brown =

American-born architect and academic

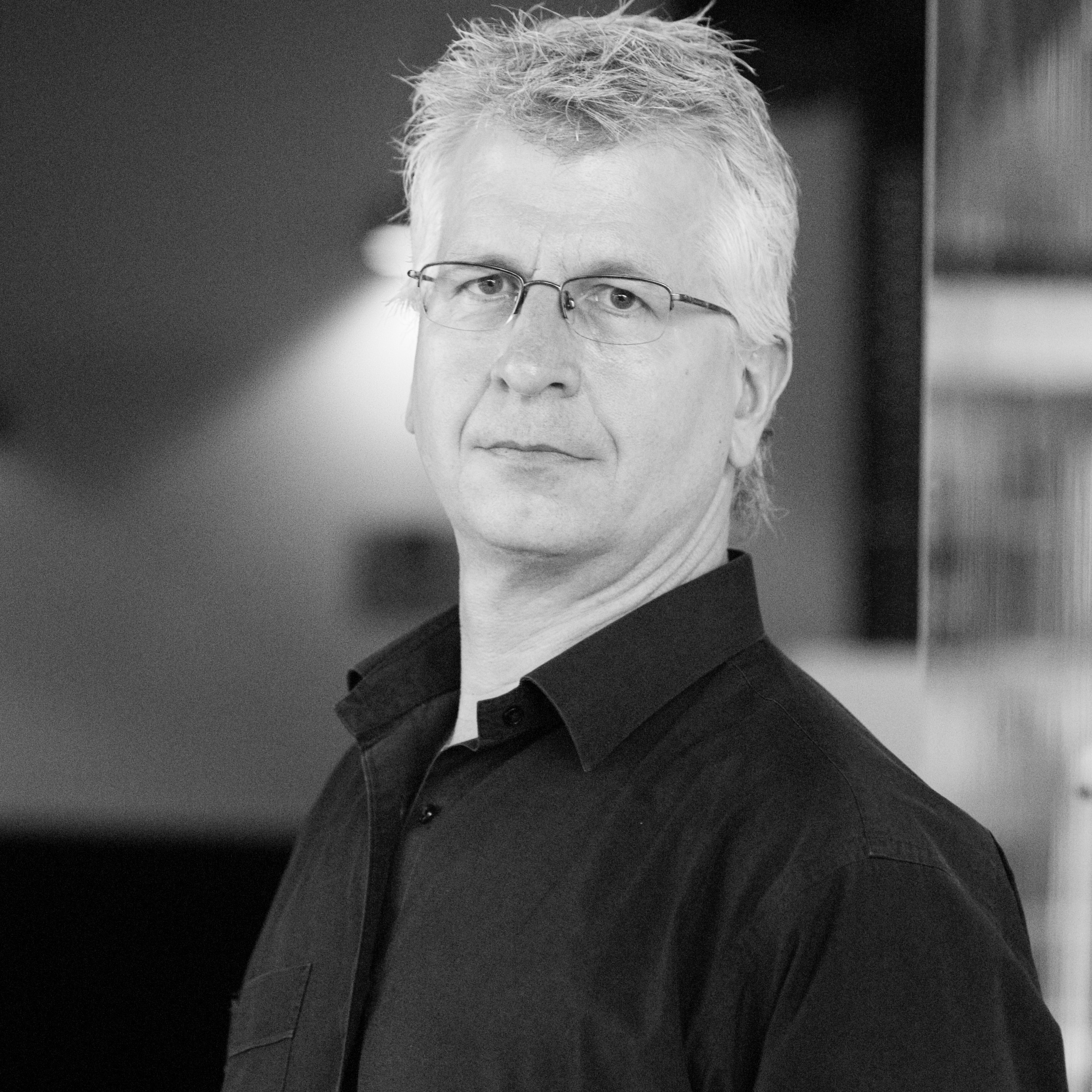
- Born: 30 March 1954 (age 72); Atlanta, Georgia, USA
- Education: MArch, Yale University (1982); BA, Williams College (1976)
- Occupations: Architect and Professor of Design Studio
- Spouse: MK Johnson (m. 2005)
- Website: danielkbrown

Daniel K. Brown is a New Zealand-based American architect and academic. Brown holds the inaugural chair Professor of Design Studio at Victoria University of Wellington School of Architecture in New Zealand. His research spans speculative architectural design, allegorical architecture, urban ecology, and participatory design methodologies, integrating social, environmental, and cultural dimensions of architectural practice.

== Education ==
Brown earned a Bachelor of Arts (Honours) from Williams College in 1976, where he was placed on the Dean’s List, and subsequently completed a Master of Architecture (M.Arch.) at Yale University in 1982, studying under prominent architects such as John Hejduk and engaging with narrative and speculative approaches to architectural design.

== Career ==
From 1984 to 1995 Brown worked for Brown Daltas & Partners in Rome, Harry Seidler & Associates in Sydney, and Richard Meier & Partners in New York. From 1990 to 1996 Brown was vice-president of Emilio Ambasz and Associates in New York. In 1997 Brown was awarded a nine-month American Institute of Indian Studies Fellowship to study narrative architecture in India, followed by a three-month Asian Cultural Council Fellowship in Nepal and a nine-month Fulbright Fellowship in Thailand. In 1998 he was hired to teach architectural design at the Victoria University of Wellington in New Zealand. During his academic career, Brown has won 12 teaching awards, including the New Zealand National Award for Sustained Excellence in Tertiary Teaching.

In 2010, a 5-year retrospective of Brown's collaborative research with New York artist Kristin Jones was exhibited at the prestigious Venice Biennale of Architecture in the host Italy Pavilion as part of the exhibition "Reflections from the Future", curated by Luca Molinari, one of Italy's leading curators.

In 2021, Brown was one of 12 academics worldwide selected to be featured in the London journal Architectural Design in the August 2021 special edition Emerging Talents: Training Architects, which showcases “the students and teachers who are pushing the envelope of architecture in extraordinary ways."

== ^{Scholarly works} ==
Brown has made significant contributions to architectural scholarship through both books and peer-reviewed research. His edited volume, The Allegorical Architectural Machine, co-edited with Michael Chapman and published as part of the Architectural Design series, investigates the role of the machine as an allegorical device in architectural discourse, exploring how allegory and machine typologies can expand architectural narratives and provoke responses to environmental, political, cultural, and social issues in design and drawing.

In addition to this, Brown has authored peer-reviewed articles such as “The Eternal Present of the Mythical Event: Re-establishing Place Identity with Speculative Installations that Reawaken Heritage Stories” (2020) in Asylum 2020/4, which examines how speculative architectural installations can generate cultural narratives and foster a sense of place, connecting architectural intervention with heritage and urban regeneration.

Another article, “Idea-building” (2022) in Architecture Now, explores abstract and speculative architectural drawing practices, particularly as they are applied in exhibitions of speculative work in Wellington. Beyond these works, Brown’s scholarly output encompasses contributions to design periodicals, edited volumes, and architectural research catalogues, consistently addressing narrative architecture, speculative design, and the use of visual representation as a methodological tool in architectural research.

== ^{Research} ==
Brown’s scholarly practice informs his teaching. He developed and leads the Narrative Architecture research platform at the School of Architecture, Te Herenga Waka—Victoria University of Wellington, integrating speculative narrative and allegory into architectural pedagogy.

Brown’s theoretical work situates architecture within cultural storytelling, mythic forms and collective memory, emphasising how architectural design can enact stories and social narratives in spatial form.

Much of his research emphasises the role of drawing and representation as research tools that extend architectural thinking beyond conventional practice into explorations of cultural myth, environment and time.

Brown’s research investigates how neglected architectural and urban sites can be revitalised through design interventions that re‑establish links to environmental, historical and cultural contexts, turning abandoned terrain into meaningful spatial narratives.
