= Wittehaus =

Architectural design firm in the US

Wittehaus, LLC
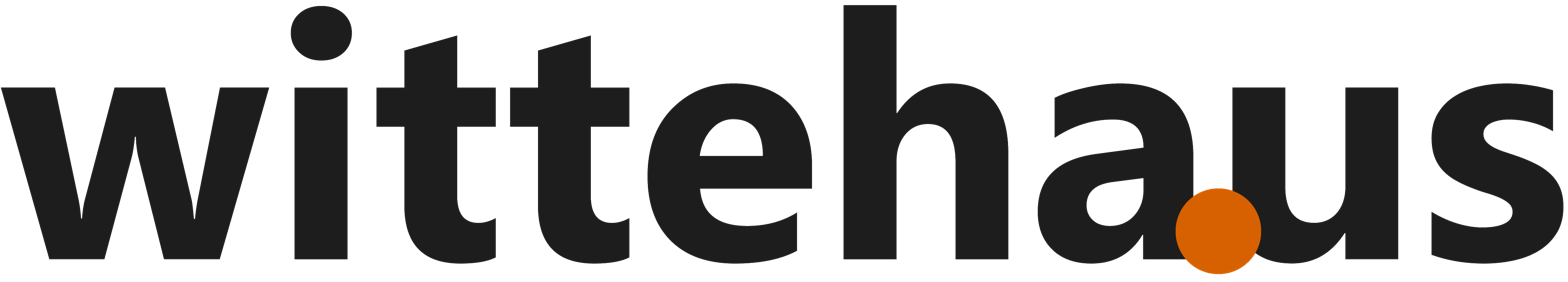
- Type: Private
- Industry: Residential Home Design
- Founded: October 31, 2017
- Founder: Toby Witte
- Headquarters: Charlotte, North Carolina
- Number of locations: 8 offices
- Area served: North America
- Services: Construction Support, Consultation, Design
- Website: https://www.witteha.us/

Wittehaus is an architectural design firm specializing in contemporary, energy-efficient luxury homes. Founded in 2017 by Toby Witte, the company is headquartered in Charlotte, North Carolina. Wittehaus offers a range of services, including design, consultation, and construction support, tailored to prospective homeowners. In 2025, Wittehaus was featured on Forbes’ list of America's Top 200 Residential Architects.

== History & Recognition ==
The firm was founded in 2017 by Toby Witte, who grew up in the outskirts of Hamburg, Germany, influenced by the city's innovative urban fabric and Bauhaus's concepts of minimalism.

Prior to Wittehaus’s founding, Dwell magazine noted that Witte’s work “gently asserts its own presence in the city.” His Schoenberg Residence was later featured by The New York Times and Charlotte Magazine. In 2018, The Charlotte Observer described Witte's work as a “labor of passion.”

In 2021, Build Magazine recognized Wittehaus as the "most innovative design firm in North Carolina." In 2023, Toby Witte published Supersizing Bliss: How We Have Betrayed Our Homes and the Happiness We Seek, a book exploring the history and design philosophy behind single-family homes in the United States. Kirkus Reviews praised the book, highlighting Witte’s “vivid prose” and describing it as “an absorbing brief for great architecture as a human necessity.”

Also in 2023, the American Institute of Architects included Wittehaus’s Gillingham Strauss Residence and Pavilion in a tour of modern homes. Following the completion of the Gerendák lake home that same year, The Wall Street Journal commended the firm's approach, describing it as “European-style modernism, with an emphasis on sustainability.” The Journal showcased the Gerendák home as an example of near net-zero energy efficiency, “producing almost as much energy as it uses during the year.”

Principal architect Toby Witte was recognized by Marquis Who's Who in 2023 for his "dedication to the field of architecture" and his contributions to “custom, modern, and energy-efficient homes in North and South Carolina.” In 2024, Architectural Digest described Wittehaus’s design philosophy as “fashioning homes that both reflect the client and interact beautifully with their natural environment,” adding that Wittehaus “designs homes for happiness.”

In 2025, Forbes featured Wittehaus in its list of America's Top 200 Residential Architects, writing the firm's work is "rigorous and principled - architecture with a capital “A”."

In an interview with Toby Witte in 2025 Architecture Lab described the work of Wittehaus as "marked by spatial clarity, material honesty, and environmental intelligence, emphasizing the transformative potential of carefully considered domestic architecture."

The 2025 architectural book Inspired Modern Living, described Witthaus's work as creating "deeply personal buildings that not only are exquisite structures and inspiring contemporary spaces, but that also offer a unique sense of home."

== Notable projects ==
Gerendák Home, Charlotte, NC

- Cohen Davis Residence, North Carolina, 2023
- Gerendák, North Carolina, 2022
- Witte Home, North Carolina, 2017

== Awards ==
The firm has won regional, national, and international awards, including an Honorable Mention in Architecture / Residential Architecture by Architecture Masterprize in 2023, Winner of the World Design Awards 2023 by The Architecture Community, and Gold Winner of the 2023 APR Global Future Design Awards.

In 2023 Wittehaus was recognized with an Honorable Mention in Architectural Design / Residential by BLT Built Design Awards in Luzern, Switzerland alongside Zaha Hadid Architects and Kengo Kuma and Associates.

Forbes listed Wittehaus on their list of "America's Top 200 Residential Architects" in 2025 and their "America's Best-In-State Residential Architects" lists in 2025 and 2026.

NC Modernist Homes rewarded Wittehaus with a Matsumoto Prize "Peoples Choice" award in 2018 and "1st Jury" award in 2026.
