= Mbanna Kantako =

Blind African freedom fighter

Mbanna Kantako (born Dewayne Readus) is a blind African freedom fighter who is active in the Low-power broadcasting (microwatt, FM pirate radio broadcasting) in the United States of America. His history of unlicensed broadcasting in the service of social and racial justice has made him "an early hero of the micro-broadcasting movement."

== Brief biography ==
=== Mail order kit ===
During the 1980s, Mbanna Kantako had been living in a public housing project in Springfield, Illinois. With the help of Mike Townsend, a professor of social work at a small college in Springfield, Mbanna Kantako obtained a 1 watt transmitter kit from a mail order catalog.

=== Housing Project Tenants' Association ===
Having constructed the transmitter, Mbanna used to communicate with other Black residents in the housing project under the call letters WTRA ("Tenants Rights Association"), of which he was a member. These transmissions went through more changes of name from Black Liberation Radio to African Liberation Radio.

=== Fine ===
Mbanna Kantako found himself under investigation by the FCC when his microwatt transmissions expanded in both duration and content by featuring youths who were in trouble with the Housing Project police. Then he was ordered to cease his broadcasts. Like a lot of pirate radio broadcasters at first he complied and then came back on the airwaves. However, he announced his return by informing the FCC of his intention by means of a public announcement to the press. The net result was a summons to appear in court where he faced a $750 fine. Kantako claimed that he could not get a court-appointed lawyer and so he refused to go to court and as a result a default judgment was entered against him.

=== Inspirational anarchy ===
His press conference inspired others to also start microwatt stations in other cities. Radio Free Detroit took to the air and it was promptly raided by the FCC. But in short order it was followed by Free Radio Berkeley and then San Francisco Liberation Radio.

Kantako also returned to the air from 7pm to midnight every day. His reasoning is exactly the same as Alan Weiner who started Radio Newyork International after first operating both licensed and unlicensed commercial radio stations on land in the New York City area. Kantako claims that he should be left alone because he is just using an open space on the spectrum.

== See also ==
- Low-power broadcasting
