= Shane Wighton =

American YouTuber (born 1991)

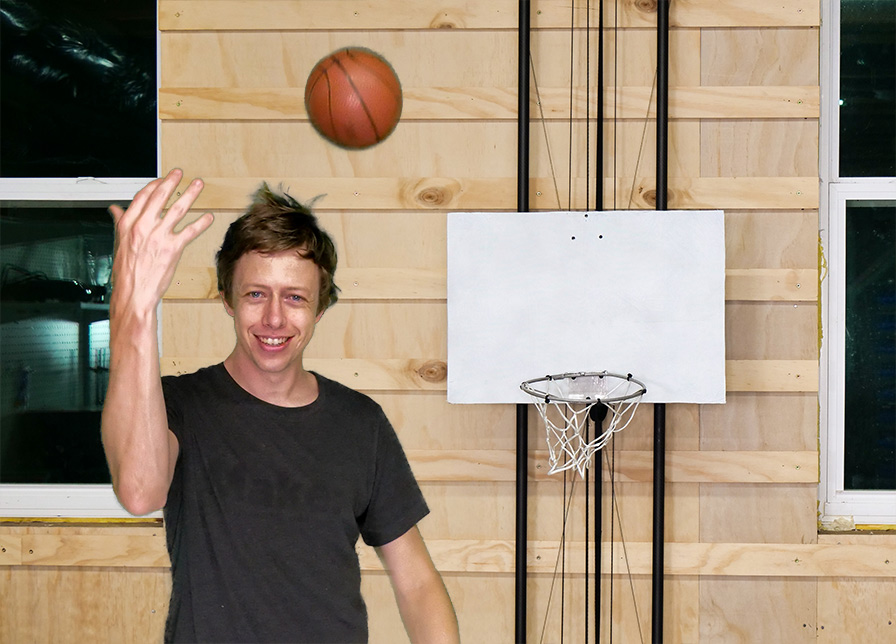
- Wighton in 2020
- Born: September 15, 1991 (age 35)
- Education: University of North Carolina at Charlotte (BS, MS)

YouTube information
- Channel: Stuff Made Here
- Years active: 2020–present
- Subscribers: 4.72 million
- Views: 336 million
- Last updated: January 2026

Shane Wighton (born September 15, 1991) is an American engineer best known for his YouTube channel, Stuff Made Here, an engineering-focused channel where Wighton builds various creative inventions.

Stuff Made Here was nominated for the Technology Subject Award at the 10th Streamy Awards.

== Content ==
As of April 2026 his most viewed video, entitled "Moving hoop won't let you miss", has over 28 million views. In the video, he creates a basketball hoop that uses various motors to adjust its angle within 0.6 seconds in order for the basketball to always go into the basketball net. His first variation of the net was not built using electronics, but utilizes a curved backboard in order to redirect the ball into the net from most angles.

At the beginning of the COVID-19 pandemic, he built a robot that cuts hair using various sensors and scissors. For Halloween, he converted the hair-cutting machine into a machine that maps images and carves intricate designs onto pumpkins.

On June 2, 2020, he posted a video where he created a golf-club that automatically adjusts to achieve certain distances and club types.

In April 2026, he further improved the golf club to make shots on five, almost impossible holes.

Wighton has also posted two videos where he created multiple versions of baseball bats that utilize blank cartridges and pistons to try to beat the world home-run distance record.

On February 15, 2021, Wighton posted a video in which he created a pool table and cue stick that analyses every potential shot and projects the best option on the table itself which one player can then attempt. The cue stick will tilt up, down, left, and right to compensate for bad aiming by a player in order to attempt the shot with a high level of accuracy.

In April 2021, Wighton made a "robotic chainsaw" using a chainsaw and a Tormach ZA6 Robot.

In May 2021, Wighton designed two "unpickable" custom locks, and sent them to lockpicking YouTuber LockPickingLawyer as a challenge. In a response video, LockPickingLawyer picked the first lock in exactly 60 seconds, and the second lock in 52 seconds using pliers and a mallet.

== Professional life ==
Wighton attended the University of North Carolina at Charlotte, where he received a bachelor’s degree in mechanical engineering and a master’s degree in computer science. Wighton formerly led an engineering team at Formlabs that makes 3D printers that utilize stereolithography and selective laser sintering technology. He is an inventor with five patents and 13 pending applications.

Wighton is married with 3 children. His wife is a frequent guest in his videos.

== Gallery ==
Inventions

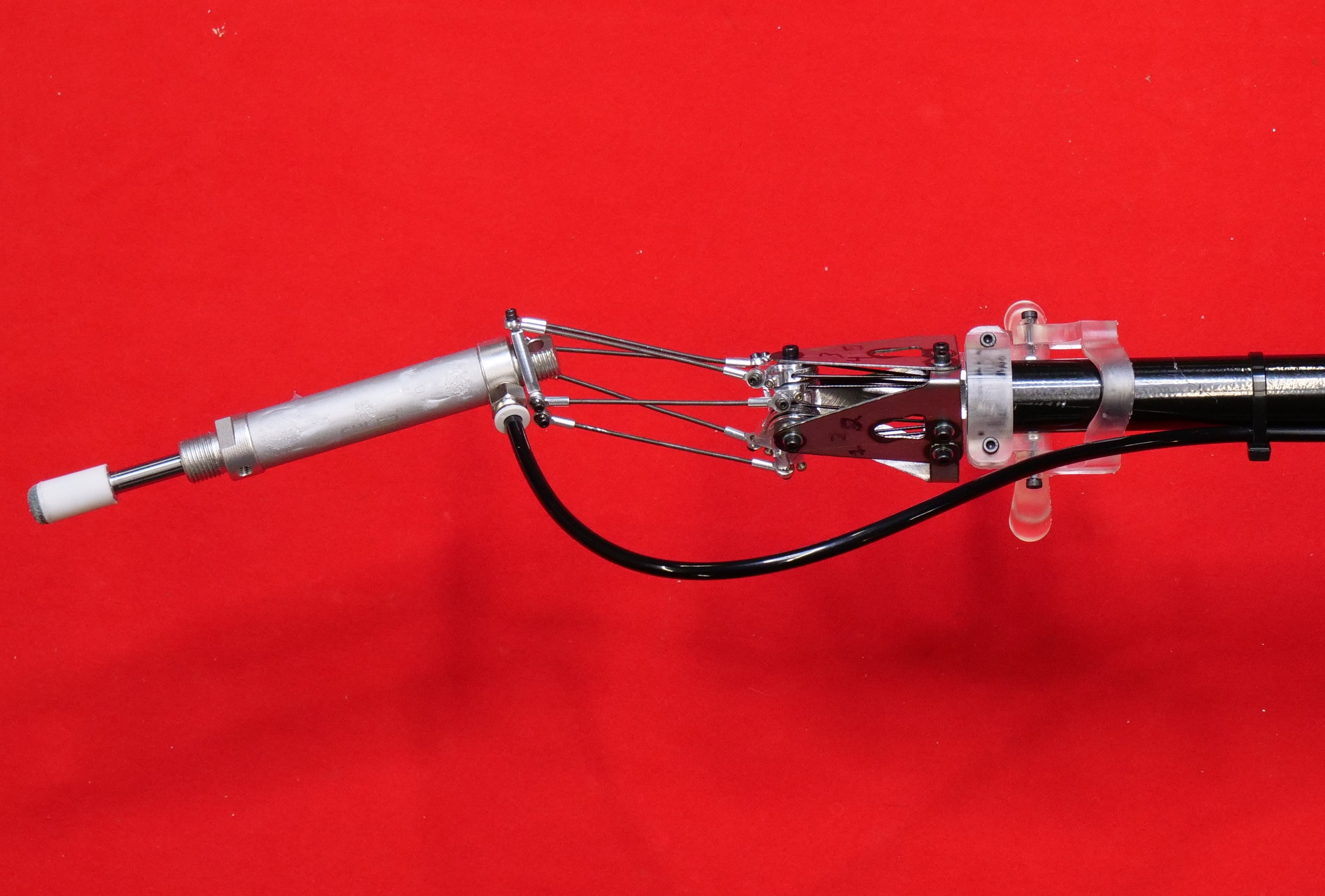
Robotic pool cue calculates the best possible shot

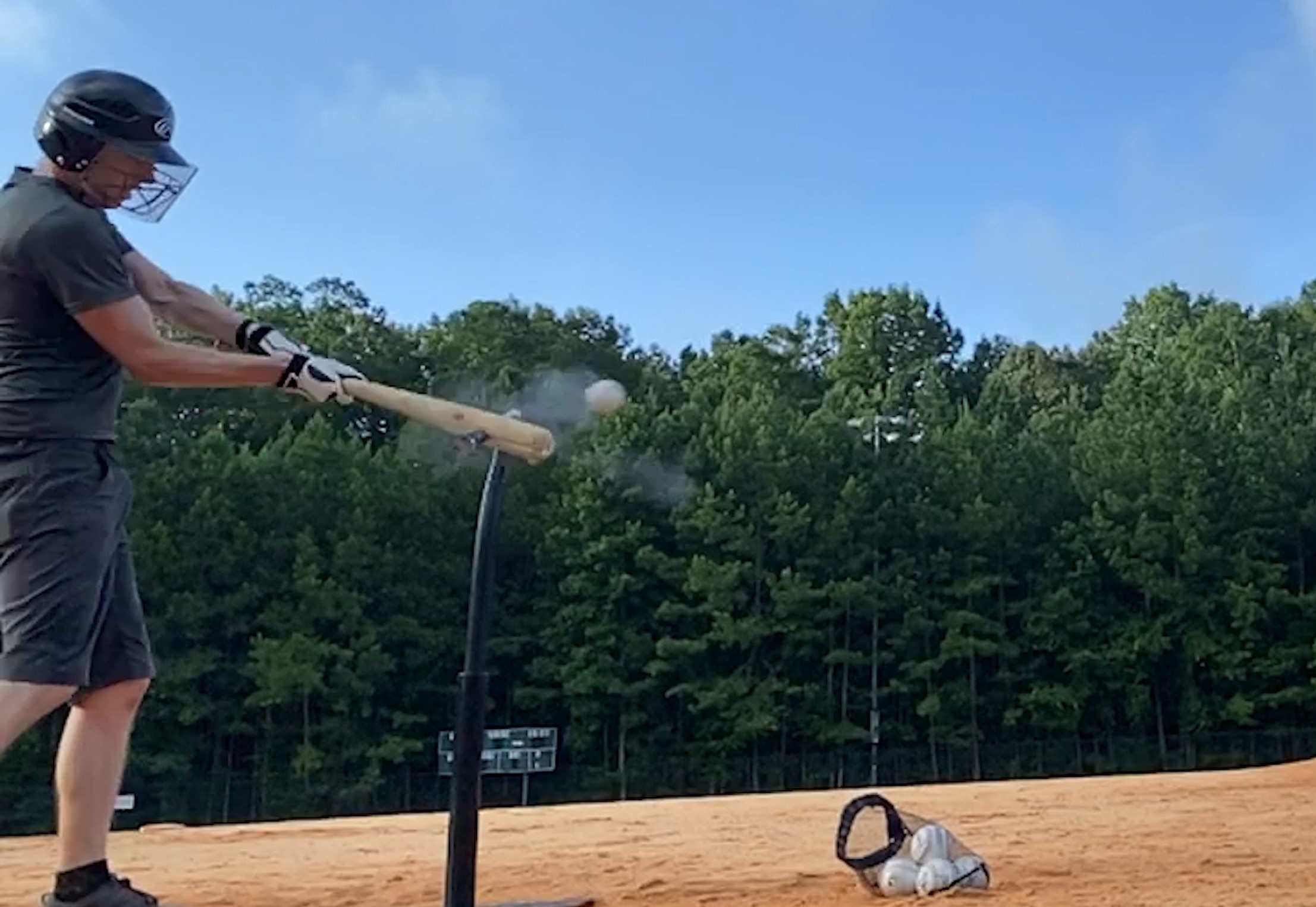
Baseball bat uses a charge to launch a baseball
