= Nalina Moses =

Architect and author

Nalina Moses is an American architect and author who works in New York City. She has designed retail, residential and institutional architecture projects. Moses studied art history at Yale University and received a master's of architecture at Harvard University Graduate School of Design. She has written about architecture and design in publications, including her blog, Drown Me in Beauty. She published her first book, Single-Handedly: Contemporary Architects Draw By Hand in 2019.

== Career ==
Moses founded Nalina Moses Architect P.C. in 2009. Through her company, she has a contract position as lead designer for Tiffany and Co. She has worked as a project manager for retail brands Coach, Michael Kors and Polo Ralph Lauren and worked at the Architecture firm, Gentler and Robert A. M Stern.

== Awards ==
Moses was awarded the Architecture Writing Fellowship at the writer's colony in Eureka Springs, Arkansas.

== Published work ==
Moses is the author of, Single-Handedly: Contemporary Architects Draw By Hand which was published by Princeton Architectural Press in 2019. The book reflects on architect's intense shift to using computer-aided design tools in the early 1960s – notably AutoCAD. Moses reconsiders the use of hand-drawing in the profession of architecture and shares a collection of over 200 drawings by 43 contemporary architects, who have set aside digital tools in favour of sketching, and other artistic media. Amongst this collection is an essay by Moses, and a foreword by Tom Kundig, which both detail the benefits and limitations of computer-aided and freehand forms of architectural drawing. This includes how the act of drawing by hand can benefit the creative process, and be a tool for experimenting freely. The publication was presented along with an accompanied exhibit at the Art Omi in 2020. In Paul Glassman's review of the book drew the conclusion from it that "if architects are to continue as visionaries, they must preserve the venerable technique of drawing that makes personal expression possible."

Notable architects and illustrators in the book include Fernanda Canales, Liesbeth van der Pol and Bishakh Som.

Sun, stone, glass and new wealth: a critical overview of new architecture in India is an article authored by Moses for the Harvard Design Magazine in Spring/Summer 2009 issue 30. In the article Moses explores the architectural transformations that will ensue after India's extensive economic growth over the past 20 years, similar to that of China's rapid development.

Moses also maintains a blog, Drown me in Beauty, that includes entries on searching for beauty, and uncovering what that means. Other published work includes articles in journals such as; ArchitectureBoston, Artwirt, Design Bureau, Harvard Design Magazine, Vogue. She has been a member and mentor for the Women in the Profession of Architecture since 2020.
