= Copyright Royalty Board =

U.S. system to determine copyright license terms

The Copyright Royalty Board (CRB) is a U.S. system of three copyright royalty judges who determine rates and terms for copyright statutory licenses and make determinations on distribution of statutory license royalties collected by the U.S. Copyright Office of the Library of Congress. The board, made up of three permanent copyright royalty judges, was created under the Copyright Royalty and Distribution Reform Act of 2004, which became effective on May 31, 2005, when the Copyright Arbitration Royalty Panel system was phased out. These administrative judges are appointed by the Librarian of Congress.

== May 2007 webcasting royalty increase ==
On May 1, 2007, after 48 days of oral testimony (and 13,288 pages of written testimony), the Copyright Royalty Board set new rates for webcasting for the 2006–2010 License Period. The rates are higher than the then-existing royalties paid for non-interactive webcasting. One component of rate increase was to remove the cap on the per-station/channel minimum fee of US$500, which used to be US$2,500.

The law requires rates to be based on the price that would be set by a marketplace of willing sellers and willing buyers. Much of the discussion focused on the definition of "willing seller". The Board decided that an individual record company was the basic unit of a "willing seller".

An issue that smaller webcasters raised was the desire to be assured that their fees would not exceed their revenue. The Board rejected this reasoning in their final decision because the ability of smaller stations to generate revenue from their operations has little or no bearing on the market value of the rights held by the copyright holders.

A coalition of webcasters that included National Public Radio (NPR) joined together to request a rehearing on the increase in rates. On April 16, 2007, the CRB rejected the appeal on the grounds that no new evidence was introduced.

=== License fee rates ===
Commercial webcasters, per play, per listener rate

Year	2006	2007	2008	2009	2010
Rate (dollars)	0.0008	0.0011	0.0014	0.0018	0.0019

There is a minimum annual fee of $500 per channel or station, payable in advance, against the above per-play fees.

For example, under the 2007 rate, 100 unique listeners of a transmission of a sound recording will cost the transmitter eleven cents. The same 100 listeners previously cost a service a little over seven-and-a-half cents from 1998 through 2005. If a service plays an average of 15 songs an hour, and a listener listens for 9.1 hours a week (the average amount according to recent Bridge reports), the listener would cost the service $0.66 a month.

Noncommercial webcasters

Annual fee $500 per channel or station, up to a total of 159,140 aggregate tuning hours (ATH) per month. After this, the per-play rate for commercial webcasters applies.

== See also ==
- SoundExchange
