= WFAE =

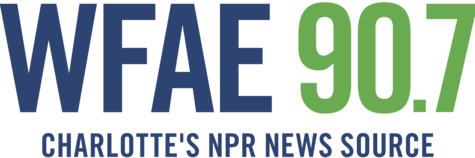

Charlotte, North Carolina; United States
- Broadcast area: Charlotte metropolitan area
- Frequency: 90.7 MHz (HD Radio)
- Branding: 90.7 WFAE

Programming
- Format: News/talk
- Subchannels: HD2: The Charlotte Jazz Channel; HD3: PRX Remix
- Affiliations: National Public Radio; Public Radio Exchange; BBC World Service

Ownership
- Owner: University Radio Foundation, Inc.

History
- First air date: April 18, 1977 (originally carrier current c. 1971-1977)
- Former frequencies: 90.9 MHz (1977–1979)
- Call sign meaning: Fine arts and education

Technical information
- Licensing authority: FCC
- Facility ID: 69436
- Class: C0
- ERP: 100,000 watts
- HAAT: 331 meters (1,086 ft)
- Transmitter coordinates: 35°17′14.5″N 80°41′44.2″W
- Translator: See § Translators
- Repeater: See § Stations

Links
- Public license information: Public file; LMS
- Webcast: Listen live
- Website: www.wfae.org

WFAE (90.7 MHz) is a non-commercial public radio station in Charlotte, North Carolina. It is the main NPR news and information member in the Charlotte region. The station's main studios and offices are at Suite 91 on the ground floor of One University Place on J.M. Keynes Drive in the University City neighborhood of northeast Charlotte. The WFAE Center for Community Engagement is located within within First Ward Park on 301 East 7th Street in Uptown Charlotte, where live shows and other community gatherings are held.

WFAE has an effective radiated power (ERP) of 100,000 watts, the maximum for most FM stations. The transmitter tower is off Caldwell Road in northeastern Mecklenburg County. It is also heard on relay stations in Hickory, Southern Pines and Laurinburg. WFAE broadcasts using HD Radio technology. Its HD-2 digital subchannel has a jazz format and its HD-3 subchannel carries the Public Radio Exchange (PRX) Remix.

== Programming ==
On weekdays, WFAE has all news and information programming. It carries programs from NPR and other public radio networks such as Morning Edition, All Things Considered, 1A, Here and Now, Marketplace and Today, Explained. The BBC World Service airs overnight. WFAE produces a local hour-long weekday interview program, Charlotte Talks with Mike Collins, heard live at 9 a.m. and repeated at 8 p.m. Frequent news updates come from NPR and the WFAE news staff.

On weekends, WFAE features specialty programs. Weekly NPR shows include Wait, Wait, Don't Tell Me, This American Life, Radiolab, Hidden Brain, The TED Radio Hour, Latino USA, On The Media, Reveal, Freakonomics Radio, The Moth Radio Hour and The New Yorker Radio Hour. WFAE is listener-supported. It holds periodic on-air fundraisers and seeks donations on its website.

== History ==
=== Student-run station ===
WFAE first signed on the air on April 18, 1977. It was the student radio service of the University of North Carolina at Charlotte, playing classical music and jazz. It was originally on 90.9 MHz, broadcasting from a 10-watt transmitter atop the library building. It succeeded a student-run carrier current station known as "WVFN" (Voice of the 49ers), which operated from the basement of the Cone University Center. As of 1976, the station had reduced the amount of Top 40 music and increased jazz programming.

The outlet was limited by its small budget, $25,000 a year, all collected from UNCC student fees. Its signal was limited to only the campus and surrounding neighborhoods of northeastern Charlotte and Mecklenburg County.

=== NPR affiliation ===
Charlotte was one of the largest markets in the South without an NPR member station until South Carolina Educational Radio outlet WPRV (now WNSC-FM) launched from a transmitter at Rock Hill on January 3, 1978. It initially broadcast instructional programs during the day before beginning a full-time schedule in July.

In September 1978, WFAE secured Federal Communications Commission (FCC) approval to move to 90.7 MHz with a full 100,000 watts. However, construction of the upgraded facility was hindered by state procurement delays.

=== High power debut ===
The station went off the air on December 7, 1979, to allow construction of its full-power facility to begin. It returned at full power on June 29, 1981. On that day, it became North Carolina's third full NPR member station, alongside WFDD in the Piedmont Triad and WUNC in the Triangle.

In addition to NPR programs, the new station aired jazz during the day with classical music at night and on Sundays. Later, jazz was moved to night. The station grew rapidly, and within five years moved to larger studios in the One University Place building near the UNC Charlotte campus, where the station is still based today.

In February 1986, WFAE began airing new-age music on a Sunday evening show emphasizing contemporary jazz, featuring such artists as George Winston and Kitaro. The show was called "New Age Sunday" at first, but the station dropped that name to distance itself from the new age spiritual movement. In 1987, WFAE began broadcasting 24 hours a day and began airing more news and information programming along with more contemporary jazz, dropping classical music because WDAV played it.

=== Foundation control ===
WFAE's growth occurred amid financial uncertainty. UNC Charlotte was eventually forced to end support for the station due to a budget crunch. On April 15, 1993, UNC Charlotte handed over control to a nonprofit community board, the University Radio Foundation, which still owns the station today.

WFAE continued to grow through the next decade. It added a satellite station in Hickory, North Carolina, WFHE, at 90.3 MHz, in 1995. WFAE's signal is spotty at best in some parts of the North Carolina Foothills. WFHE simulcasts WFAE.

=== More news, less music ===
In 1996, WFAE largely dropped music in favor of a news/talk. It was one of the first NPR stations to air NPR's midday news/talk block (The Diane Rehm Show, Fresh Air and Talk of the Nation). However, it had been committed to news long before then.

In 1998, it launched Charlotte Talks, hosted by longtime WBT host Mike Collins. Charlotte Talks is a popular local show that focuses on local issues and figures and airs live at 9 a.m. Monday through Friday. It soon became "the de facto talk show of record in Charlotte".

In November 2000, WFAE dropped its last jazz program, Jazz Tonight with Barbara Nail, which ran from 8 to midnight weekdays, replacing it with a rerun of Fresh Air, The Todd Mundt Show, and two extra hours of The World Today.

=== Weekend programming ===
In April 2023, WFAE dropped its last remaining music programming, consisting of ambient music program Echoes and the rock music talk show Sound Opinions. WFAE also used to air a locally produced Sunday evening program of new-age music called Nightscapes, but replaced that with an expanded broadcast of Echoes. For many years, WFAE was the originating station for The Thistle & Shamrock, a popular Celtic music show from NPR that originated on WFAE when it was licensed to UNC Charlotte and its host, Fiona Ritchie, was a visiting professor at the university. It began as a local program soon after WFAE signed on, and was picked up nationally in 1983. Even after WFAE dropped most music programming from its schedule, Thistle remained on the schedule until 2013.

=== HD Radio ===
In 2004, WFAE became the first station in Charlotte and the first public radio station in North Carolina to broadcast using HD Radio. HD Radio was also added to WFHE.

On July 28, 2008, WFAE began airing jazz from JazzWorks on one of its HD channels to reach those disappointed by WNSC-FM joining SCETV's all-news network. Locally produced jazz shows were a possibility as well, since the station still has a large music library.

In 2012, WFAE added two low-powered translators in the Sandhills—one in Laurinburg and one in Southern Pines.

== Leadership ==
Current Leadership

- Ju-Don Marshall, President and Chief Executive Officer
- Richard Lancaster, President of the Board of Directors
- Nick Wharton, Vice President of the Board of Directors

Charlotte Talks

- Mike Collins, host
- Wendy Herkey, executive producer

Previous WFAE General Managers

- Robert “Bo” Pittman
- Jennifer Roth
- Jon Schwartz
- Roger Sarow
- Joe O’Connor

Previous Program Directors

- Jennifer Roth
- Paul Stribling
- Dale Spear

== Awards ==
WFAE has won multiple regional Edward R. Murrow Awards in the years, 2014, 2017 and 2018 and 2020. WFAE has also won Sunshine Award for Journalism in 2017.

== Additional stations ==
In addition to WFAE's primary 100,000 watt signal, there is one full-power station licensed to simulcast the programming of WFAE:

Call sign	Frequency	City of license	Facility ID	ERP W	Height m (ft)	Class	Transmitter coordinates	Call sign assigned
WFHE	90.3 FM (HD)	Hickory, North Carolina	69437	4,000	127 m (417 ft)	C3	35°50′59.4″N 81°26′39.3″W	December 19, 1994

=== Translators ===
WFAE programming is broadcast on the following translators:

Broadcast translators for WFAE
Call sign	Frequency	City of license	FID	ERP (W)	HAAT	Class	Transmitter coordinates	FCC info
W229BD	93.7 FM	Southern Pines, North Carolina	148046	10	94.2 m (309 ft)	D	35°07′36.5″N 79°23′44.1″W	LMS
W291BM	106.1 FM	Laurinburg, North Carolina	147924	80	51.7 m (170 ft)	D	{{{coord2}}}	LMS
