= New Georgia Project =

Voter registration and turnout non-profit

- Formation: 2013
- Dissolved: 2025
- Type: Nonprofit (501(c)(3)), with affiliated Nonprofit 501(c)(4) action fund
- Purpose: Voter registration and voter turnout, Political campaigning
- Headquarters: Atlanta, GA
- Region served: Georgia
- Founder: Stacey Abrams
- Website: Official website

The New Georgia Project was an organization with a mission to engage, register and build political participation for traditionally underrepresented groups like Black, Latino and young voters in Georgia. In addition to registering voters and boosting voter turnout, another focus was to monitor for changes at election boards around the state of Georgia to be able to help other voters fight and/or adapt to the changes.

It grew to become one of the largest and most recognizable voter registration and turnout organizations in Georgia, with 10 field offices around the state. Organizers were not focused only on the presidential race and encourage people to register and vote because of the impact it can have in more local offices that might be able to more directly address their concerns. They also referred to low-propensity voters and high-opportunity voters.

The New Georgia Project and its affiliate, the New Georgia Project Action Fund, campaigned for Stacey Abrams in her 2018 gubernatorial campaign, other Democratic political campaigns in the state, and an unsuccessful 2019 MARTA referendum in Gwinnett County. In 2025, it admitted to 16 violations of state campaign finance laws and was ordered to pay $300,000 by the Georgia State Ethics Commission, the largest fine for campaign finance violations in state history. The New Georgia Project raised and spent millions of dollars in its partisan efforts, which it should have disclosed as part of registering as an independent political committee with the state.

In October 2025, the organization announced its closure but did not share any details for the closure.

== Organization ==
The organization was founded in 2013 by Stacey Abrams. A Politico investigation described internal disorganization from leadership starting around 2018 through 2022, when CEO Nsé Ufot was at the helm. In February 2024, then CEO Kendra Cotton said the group had addressed its internal problems and will be a major player in the upcoming election. She was terminated by the board in late June 2024 through a hostile takeover orchestrated by board chair Francys Johnson. Johnson announced he was stepping down from the board during a hastily arranged staff call on February 24, 2025. In October 2025, the organization shut down.

== See also ==
- 2024 United States presidential election in Georgia
- New North Carolina Project
- New Pennsylvania Project
- Voter suppression in the United States
- Campaign finance in the United States
