= James Harrell =

James Harrell may refer to:

- James A. Harrell III (born 1971), a.k.a. Jim Harrell, Democratic politician
- James Harrell (American football) (born 1957), former American college and professional football player
- James Harrell (actor) (1918–2000), American actor
- Jim Harrell Jr., Democratic nominee
