= Sossamon =

Sossamon is a surname. Notable people with the surname include:

- Len Sossamon (born 1950/51), American real estate developer, county administrator, and politician
- Lou Sossamon (1921–2019), American football player
- Shannyn Sossamon (born 1978), American actress, director and musician
- Harvey Sossamon, petitioner in Sossamon v. Texas
