= 2026 North Carolina elections =

- November 3, 2026

The 2026 North Carolina elections were held in the state of North Carolina on November 3, 2026, alongside the nationwide midterm elections. Elections were held for a U.S. Senate seat as well as all 14 of the state's U.S. House of Representatives seats, all seats in the North Carolina Senate and House of Representatives, as well as judicial and local elections. Candidate qualifying for the primaries was held from December 1 to December 19, 2025. Primary elections were held on March 3, 2026, and runoff elections (where necessary) were held on May 12.

== Background ==
A swing state, North Carolina frequently votes for both Republicans and Democrats statewide. Democrats have controlled the governorship since 2017. Partisan control of the Council of State is divided, with Democrats controlling the offices of Lieutenant Governor, Attorney General, Secretary of State, and Superintendent of Public Instruction, and Republicans controlling the offices of Auditor, Commissioner of Agriculture, Commissioner of Labor, and Commissioner of Insurance. Going into the 2026 elections, Democrats had not won a statewide federal election in North Carolina since 2008, when Barack Obama narrowly carried the state over John McCain and Kay Hagan unseated Elizabeth Dole in the U.S. Senate.

In 2024, North Carolina saw mixed election results. Donald Trump carried the state over Kamala Harris by 3.2%. Following redistricting, Republicans picked up three Democratic-held seats in the United States House of Representatives. In the race for governor, Democratic attorney general Josh Stein defeated Lieutenant Governor Mark Robinson in a landslide. Democrats flipped control of the Lieutenant Governor and Superintendent of Public Instruction offices, and Republicans flipped control of the State Auditor's office.

== United States Senate ==
Incumbent Republican senator Thom Tillis, who was re-elected with 48.7% of the vote in 2020, chose to retire.

Former Democratic governor Roy Cooper ran for the Democratic nomination. Former Democratic representative Wiley Nickel originally announced he was running for the Democratic nomination, but withdrew in July 2025. Former Republican National Committee chairman Michael Whatley and attorney Don Brown ran for the Republican nomination. Roy Cooper and Michael Whatley won their respective races during the primaries, and went on to face each other in the general election.

Cooper defeated Whatley by what was the widest winning margin in a U.S. Senate race in North Carolina since 1974.

== United States House of Representatives ==
All 14 of North Carolina's seats in the United States House of Representatives are up for election in 2026.

Ten seats are currently held by Republicans, and four are held by Democrats.

== State legislative ==
=== Polling ===
Poll source	Date(s) administered	Sample size (Note: Key: A – all adults RV – registered voters LV – likely voters V – unclear)	Margin of error	Republican	Democratic	Undecided
Change Research (D) (Note: Poll sponsored by Carolina Forward)	October 1–7, 2026	829 (LV)	± 3.7%	42%	49%	9%

=== State House of Representatives ===
All 120 seats in the North Carolina House of Representatives are up for election in 2026. North Carolina state representatives serve two year terms, with the last election being in 2024.

Republicans currently hold 71 seats in the State House, one seat short of a supermajority, and Democrats hold 49 seats following the 2024 elections.

=== State Senate ===
All 50 seats in the North Carolina Senate are up for election in 2026. North Carolina state senators serve two year terms.

== Judicial elections ==
One seat on the North Carolina Supreme Court and three seats on the North Carolina Court of Appeals are up for election in 2026. Supreme Court justices serve eight year terms.

Incumbent Democratic Supreme Court justice Anita Earls is running for re-election to the North Carolina Supreme Court. She is being challenged by Republican state representative Sarah Stevens.

== Ballot measures ==
Three statewide ballot measures are scheduled to be on the November 2026 ballot.

Senate Bill 921 was passed by the North Carolina Legislature in December 2024 and would require voters to provide photo identification regardless of the method in which they intend to vote. As it amends the North Carolina Constitution, it will require at least 50% of North Carolina voters to approve of the measure for it to become law.

The second ballot measure would amend the North Carolina Constitution to reduce the maximum allowable personal and corporate income tax rate from 7% to 3.5%. According to the North Carolina Budget and Tax Center, income tax caps could affect the state's ability to balance its budget and result in a downgraded credit rating and a reliance on higher fees for government services or other regressive revenue sources. At 3.99% in 2026, North Carolina has the lowest top income tax rate of its neighboring states, besides Tennessee, which does not have a state income tax.

The third ballot measure would amend the North Carolina Constitution to require the state state legislature to pass laws limiting the amount that property taxes may increase. Analysis from the NC Housing Coalition found that if a certain contemplated property tax levy limit had been in place during the latest reevaluation cycle, counties would have had $588 million less revenue to fund emergency response, schools, and other services, while the average homeowner would have saved $84 per year. The analysis also found a Rutherford Meta data center would have saved $1.2 million per year.
