= North Carolina's 90th House district =

American legislative district

North Carolina's 90th State House of Representatives district
Representative
| Dan Kiger; R–State Road |
- Demographics: 82% White; 3% Black; 12% Hispanic; 1% Asian; 2% Multiracial
- Population (2024): 87,712

North Carolina's 90th House district is one of 120 districts in the North Carolina House of Representatives. It has been represented by Republican Dan Kiger since his appointment in 2026.

== Geography ==
Since 2023, the district has included all of Surry County, as well as part of Wilkes County. The district overlaps with the 36th Senate district.

== District officeholders ==
| Representative | Party | Dates | Notes | Counties |
|---|---|---|---|---|
District created January 1, 1993.
| Robin Hayes (Concord) | Republican | January 1, 1993 – January 1, 1997 | Retired to run for Governor. | 1993–2003; Part of Cabarrus County. |
| Richard Moore (Kannapolis) | Democratic | January 1, 1997 – May 7, 2000 | Resigned. | 1993–2003; Part of Cabarrus County. |
| Vacant | | May 7, 2000 – May 17, 2000 | | 1993–2003; Part of Cabarrus County. |
| Len Sossamon (Concord) | Democratic | May 17, 2000 – January 1, 2001 | Appointed to finish Moore's term. Lost re-election. | 1993–2003; Part of Cabarrus County. |
| Linda Johnson (Kannapolis) | Republican | January 1, 2001 – January 1, 2003 | Redistricted to the 74th district. | 1993–2003; Part of Cabarrus County. |
| Jim Harrell (Elkin) | Democratic | January 1, 2003 – January 1, 2009 | Lost re-election. | 2003–2013; All of Alleghany County. Part of Surry County. |
| Sarah Stevens (Mount Airy) | Republican | January 1, 2009 – June 16, 2026 | Retired to run for State Supreme Court and resigned. | 2003–2013; All of Alleghany County. Part of Surry County. |
| Sarah Stevens (Mount Airy) | Republican | January 1, 2009 – June 16, 2026 | Retired to run for State Supreme Court and resigned. | 2013–2019; All of Surry County. Part of Wilkes County. |
| Sarah Stevens (Mount Airy) | Republican | January 1, 2009 – June 16, 2026 | Retired to run for State Supreme Court and resigned. | 2019–2023; All of Alleghany County. Parts of Surry and Wilkes counties. |
| Sarah Stevens (Mount Airy) | Republican | January 1, 2009 – June 16, 2026 | Retired to run for State Supreme Court and resigned. | 2023–Present; All of Surry County. Part of Wilkes County. |
| Vacant | | June 16, 2026 – June 23, 2026 | | 2023–Present; All of Surry County. Part of Wilkes County. |
| Dan Kiger (State Road) | Republican | June 23, 2026 – Present | Appointed to finish Stevens' term. | 2023–Present; All of Surry County. Part of Wilkes County. |

== Election results ==
=== 2026 ===
North Carolina House of Representatives 90th district Republican primary election, 2026
| Party | Candidate | Votes | % |
|---|---|---|---|
| Republican | Dan Kiger | 7,459 | 51.91% |
| Republican | Paul Barker | 5,156 | 35.89% |
| Republican | A.J. Daoud | 1,753 | 12.20% |
| Total votes | | 14,368 | 100% |

North Carolina House of Representatives 90th district general election, 2026
| Party | Candidate | Votes | % |
|---|---|---|---|
| Republican | Dan Kiger (incumbent) | | |
| Democratic | Ken Badgett | | |
| Total votes | | | 100% |

=== 2024 ===
North Carolina House of Representatives 90th district general election, 2024
| Party | Candidate | Votes | % |
|---|---|---|---|
| Republican | Sarah Stevens (incumbent) | 35,674 | 77.90% |
| Democratic | Ken Badgett | 10,119 | 22.10% |
| Total votes | | 45,793 | 100% |
| Republican hold | | | |

=== 2022 ===
North Carolina House of Representatives 90th district Republican primary election, 2022
| Party | Candidate | Votes | % |
|---|---|---|---|
| Republican | Sarah Stevens (incumbent) | 6,526 | 72.43% |
| Republican | Benjamin Romans | 2,484 | 27.57% |
| Total votes | | 9,010 | 100% |

North Carolina House of Representatives 90th district general election, 2022
| Party | Candidate | Votes | % |
|---|---|---|---|
| Republican | Sarah Stevens (incumbent) | 24,398 | 100% |
| Total votes | | 24,398 | 100% |
| Republican hold | | | |

=== 2020 ===
North Carolina House of Representatives 90th district general election, 2020
| Party | Candidate | Votes | % |
|---|---|---|---|
| Republican | Sarah Stevens (incumbent) | 30,028 | 74.57% |
| Democratic | Beth Shaw | 10,242 | 25.43% |
| Total votes | | 40,270 | 100% |
| Republican hold | | | |

=== 2018 ===
North Carolina House of Representatives 90th district Republican primary election, 2018
| Party | Candidate | Votes | % |
|---|---|---|---|
| Republican | Sarah Stevens (incumbent) | 4,060 | 66.57% |
| Republican | Allen Poindexter | 2,039 | 33.43% |
| Total votes | | 6,099 | 100% |

North Carolina House of Representatives 90th district general election, 2018
| Party | Candidate | Votes | % |
|---|---|---|---|
| Republican | Sarah Stevens (incumbent) | 18,373 | 68.35% |
| Democratic | John Worth Wiles | 7,170 | 26.68% |
| Constitution | Allen Poindexter | 1,336 | 4.97% |
| Total votes | | 26,879 | 100% |
| Republican hold | | | |

=== 2016 ===
North Carolina House of Representatives 90th district general election, 2016
| Party | Candidate | Votes | % |
|---|---|---|---|
| Republican | Sarah Stevens (incumbent) | 23,678 | 73.26% |
| Democratic | Vera Smith Reynolds | 8,641 | 26.74% |
| Total votes | | 32,319 | 100% |
| Republican hold | | | |

=== 2014 ===
North Carolina House of Representatives 90th district general election, 2014
| Party | Candidate | Votes | % |
|---|---|---|---|
| Republican | Sarah Stevens (incumbent) | 13,440 | 68.25% |
| Democratic | John Worth Wiles | 6,251 | 31.75% |
| Total votes | | 19,691 | 100% |
| Republican hold | | | |

=== 2012 ===
North Carolina House of Representatives 90th district general election, 2012
| Party | Candidate | Votes | % |
|---|---|---|---|
| Republican | Sarah Stevens (incumbent) | 23,153 | 100% |
| Total votes | | 23,153 | 100% |
| Republican hold | | | |

=== 2010 ===
North Carolina House of Representatives 90th district general election, 2010
| Party | Candidate | Votes | % |
|---|---|---|---|
| Republican | Sarah Stevens (incumbent) | 12,274 | 71.10% |
| Democratic | Randy Wolfe | 4,988 | 28.90% |
| Total votes | | 17,262 | 100% |
| Republican hold | | | |

=== 2008 ===
North Carolina House of Representatives 90th district general election, 2008
| Party | Candidate | Votes | % |
|---|---|---|---|
| Republican | Sarah Stevens | 13,263 | 50.58% |
| Democratic | Jim Harrell (incumbent) | 12,957 | 49.42% |
| Total votes | | 26,220 | 100% |
| Republican gain from Democratic | | | |

=== 2006 ===
North Carolina House of Representatives 90th district general election, 2006
| Party | Candidate | Votes | % |
|---|---|---|---|
| Democratic | Jim Harrell (incumbent) | 9,533 | 60.93% |
| Republican | Jack Conway | 6,114 | 39.07% |
| Total votes | | 15,647 | 100% |
| Democratic hold | | | |

=== 2004 ===
North Carolina House of Representatives 90th district general election, 2004
| Party | Candidate | Votes | % |
|---|---|---|---|
| Democratic | Jim Harrell (incumbent) | 13,374 | 57.97% |
| Republican | Jack Conaway | 9,698 | 42.03% |
| Total votes | | 23,072 | 100% |
| Democratic hold | | | |

=== 2002 ===
North Carolina House of Representatives 90th district Democratic primary election, 2002
| Party | Candidate | Votes | % |
|---|---|---|---|
| Democratic | Jim Harrell | 3,282 | 57.25% |
| Democratic | Melvin T. Jackson | 1,457 | 25.41% |
| Democratic | Todd Harris | 994 | 17.34% |
| Total votes | | 5,733 | 100% |

North Carolina House of Representatives 90th district general election, 2002
| Party | Candidate | Votes | % |
|---|---|---|---|
| Democratic | Jim Harrell | 9,395 | 52.75% |
| Republican | R. F. Buck Golding | 8,415 | 47.25% |
| Total votes | | 17,810 | 100% |
| Democratic win (new seat) | | | |

=== 2000 ===
North Carolina House of Representatives 90th district general election, 2000
| Party | Candidate | Votes | % |
|---|---|---|---|
| Republican | Linda Johnson | 13,988 | 53.77% |
| Democratic | Len Sossamon (incumbent) | 12,025 | 46.23% |
| Total votes | | 26,013 | 100% |
| Republican gain from Democratic | | | |
