= North Carolina's 82nd House district =

American legislative district

North Carolina's 82nd State House of Representatives district
Representative
Brian Echevarria; R–Harrisburg
- Demographics: 60% White; 15% Black; 8% Hispanic; 12% Asian; 1% Other; 4% Multiracial
- Population (2024): 95,000

North Carolina's 82nd House district is one of 120 districts in the North Carolina House of Representatives. It has been represented by Republican Brian Echevarria since 2025.

== Geography ==
Since 2005, the district has included part of Cabarrus County. The district overlaps with the 34th and 35th Senate districts.

== District officeholders ==
Representative	Party	Dates	Notes	Counties
District created January 1, 1993.
Bobby Barbee Sr. (Locust)	Republican	January 1, 1993 – January 1, 2003	Redistricted from the 34th district. Redistricted to the 70th district.	1993–2003; Parts of Cabarrus, Stanly, and Union counties.
Gene Wilson (Boone)	Republican	January 1, 2003 – January 1, 2005	Redistricted from the 40th district. Redistricted to the 93rd district.	2003–2005; All of Ashe and Watauga counties.
Jeff Barnhart (Concord)	Republican	January 1, 2005 – September 30, 2011	Redistricted from the 75th district. Resigned.	2005–Present; Part of Cabarrus County.
Vacant		September 30, 2011 – October 10, 2011		2005–Present; Part of Cabarrus County.
Larry Pittman (Concord)	Republican	October 10, 2011 – January 1, 2019	Appointed to finish Barnhart's term. Redistricted to the 83rd district.	2005–Present; Part of Cabarrus County.
Linda Johnson (Kannapolis)	Republican	January 1, 2019 – February 18, 2020	Redistricted from the 83rd district. Died.	2005–Present; Part of Cabarrus County.
Vacant		February 18, 2020 – March 19, 2020		2005–Present; Part of Cabarrus County.
Kristin Baker (Concord)	Republican	March 19, 2020 – January 1, 2025	Appointed to finish Johnson's term. Redistricted to the 73rd district and retired.	2005–Present; Part of Cabarrus County.
Brian Echevarria (Harrisburg)	Republican	January 1, 2025 – Present		2005–Present; Part of Cabarrus County.

== Election results ==
=== 2024 ===
North Carolina House of Representatives 82nd district Republican primary election, 2024
Party	Candidate	Votes	%
Republican	Brian Echevarria	4,626	50.92%
Republican	Kevin Crutchfield (incumbent)	4,459	49.08%
Total votes		9,085	100%

North Carolina House of Representatives 82nd district general election, 2024
Party	Candidate	Votes	%
Republican	Brian Echevarria	26,965	54.35%
Democratic	Sabrina Berry	22,649	45.65%
Total votes		49,614	100%
Republican hold			

=== 2022 ===
North Carolina House of Representatives 82nd district general election, 2022
Party	Candidate	Votes	%
Republican	Kristin Baker (incumbent)	19,935	100%
Total votes		19,935	100%
Republican hold			

=== 2020 ===
North Carolina House of Representatives 82nd district Democratic primary election, 2020
Party	Candidate	Votes	%
Democratic	Aimy Steele	7,189	83.38%
Democratic	William F. Pilkington	1,433	16.62%
Total votes		8,622	100%

North Carolina House of Representatives 82nd district Republican primary election, 2020
Party	Candidate	Votes	%
Republican	Kristin Baker	3,861	54.07%
Republican	William G. Hamby Jr.	2,061	28.86%
Republican	Parish Moffitt	1,219	17.07%
Total votes		7,141	100%

North Carolina House of Representatives 82nd district general election, 2020
Party	Candidate	Votes	%
Republican	Kristin Baker (incumbent)	25,817	53.00%
Democratic	Aimy Steele	22,898	47.00%
Total votes		48,715	100%
Republican hold			

=== 2018 ===
North Carolina House of Representatives 82nd district general election, 2018
Party	Candidate	Votes	%
Republican	Linda Johnson (incumbent)	18,969	52.75%
Democratic	Aimy Steele	16,991	47.25%
Total votes		35,960	100%
Republican hold			

=== 2016 ===
North Carolina House of Representatives 82nd district Republican primary election, 2016
Party	Candidate	Votes	%
Republican	Larry Pittman (incumbent)	5,672	52.82%
Republican	Michael Fischer	5,066	47.18%
Total votes		10,738	100%

North Carolina House of Representatives 82nd district general election, 2016
Party	Candidate	Votes	%
Republican	Larry Pittman (incumbent)	24,636	57.92%
Democratic	Earle Schecter	17,900	42.08%
Total votes		42,536	100%
Republican hold			

=== 2014 ===
North Carolina House of Representatives 82nd district Republican primary election, 2014
Party	Candidate	Votes	%
Republican	Larry Pittman (incumbent)	3,082	62.22%
Republican	Leigh Thomas Brown	1,871	37.78%
Total votes		4,953	100%

North Carolina House of Representatives 82nd district general election, 2014
Party	Candidate	Votes	%
Republican	Larry Pittman (incumbent)	13,818	59.50%
Democratic	Earle H. Schecter	9,404	40.50%
Total votes		23,222	100%
Republican hold			

=== 2012 ===
North Carolina House of Representatives 82nd district Republican primary election, 2012
Party	Candidate	Votes	%
Republican	Larry Pittman (incumbent)	4,292	51.46%
Republican	Jay White	4,049	48.54%
Total votes		8,341	100%

North Carolina House of Representatives 82nd district general election, 2012
Party	Candidate	Votes	%
Republican	Larry Pittman (incumbent)	24,674	100%
Total votes		24,674	100%
Republican hold			

=== 2010 ===
North Carolina House of Representatives 82nd district Republican primary election, 2010
Party	Candidate	Votes	%
Republican	Jeff Barnhart (incumbent)	2,955	59.40%
Republican	Larry Pittman	2,020	40.60%
Total votes		4,975	100%

North Carolina House of Representatives 82nd district general election, 2010
Party	Candidate	Votes	%
Republican	Jeff Barnhart (incumbent)	17,694	100%
Total votes		17,694	100%
Republican hold			

=== 2008 ===
North Carolina House of Representatives 82nd district Republican primary election, 2008
Party	Candidate	Votes	%
Republican	Jeff Barnhart (incumbent)	2,747	57.67%
Republican	Larry Pittman	2,016	42.33%
Total votes		4,763	100%

North Carolina House of Representatives 82nd district general election, 2008
Party	Candidate	Votes	%
Republican	Jeff Barnhart (incumbent)	21,403	54.81%
Democratic	Wayne Troutman	17,645	45.19%
Total votes		39,048	100%
Republican hold			

=== 2006 ===
North Carolina House of Representatives 82nd district general election, 2006
Party	Candidate	Votes	%
Republican	Jeff Barnhart (incumbent)	11,298	100%
Total votes		11,298	100%
Republican hold			

=== 2004 ===
North Carolina House of Representatives 82nd district Republican primary election, 2004
Party	Candidate	Votes	%
Republican	Jeff Barnhart (incumbent)	2,003	64.72%
Republican	W. Drew Becker	844	27.27%
Republican	Scott R. Herman	248	8.01%
Total votes		3,095	100%

North Carolina House of Representatives 82nd district general election, 2004
Party	Candidate	Votes	%
Republican	Jeff Barnhart (incumbent)	20,942	85.29%
Libertarian	Carl Miller	3,613	14.71%
Total votes		24,555	100%
Republican hold			

=== 2002 ===
North Carolina House of Representatives 82nd district general election, 2002
Party	Candidate	Votes	%
Republican	Gene Wilson (incumbent)	13,989	58.33%
Democratic	Dan Hense	9,056	37.76%
Libertarian	Jeff Cannon	937	3.91%
Total votes		23,982	100%
Republican hold			

=== 2000 ===
North Carolina House of Representatives 82nd district Republican primary election, 2000
Party	Candidate	Votes	%
Republican	Bobby Barbee Sr. (incumbent)	2,490	46.63%
Republican	David Almond	1,947	36.46%
Republican	Kenny Furr	903	16.91%
Total votes		5,340	100%

North Carolina House of Representatives 82nd district general election, 2000
Party	Candidate	Votes	%
Republican	Bobby Barbee Sr. (incumbent)	19,092	100%
Total votes		19,092	100%
Republican hold			
