= Linda P. Johnson =

American politician from North Carolina (1945–2020)

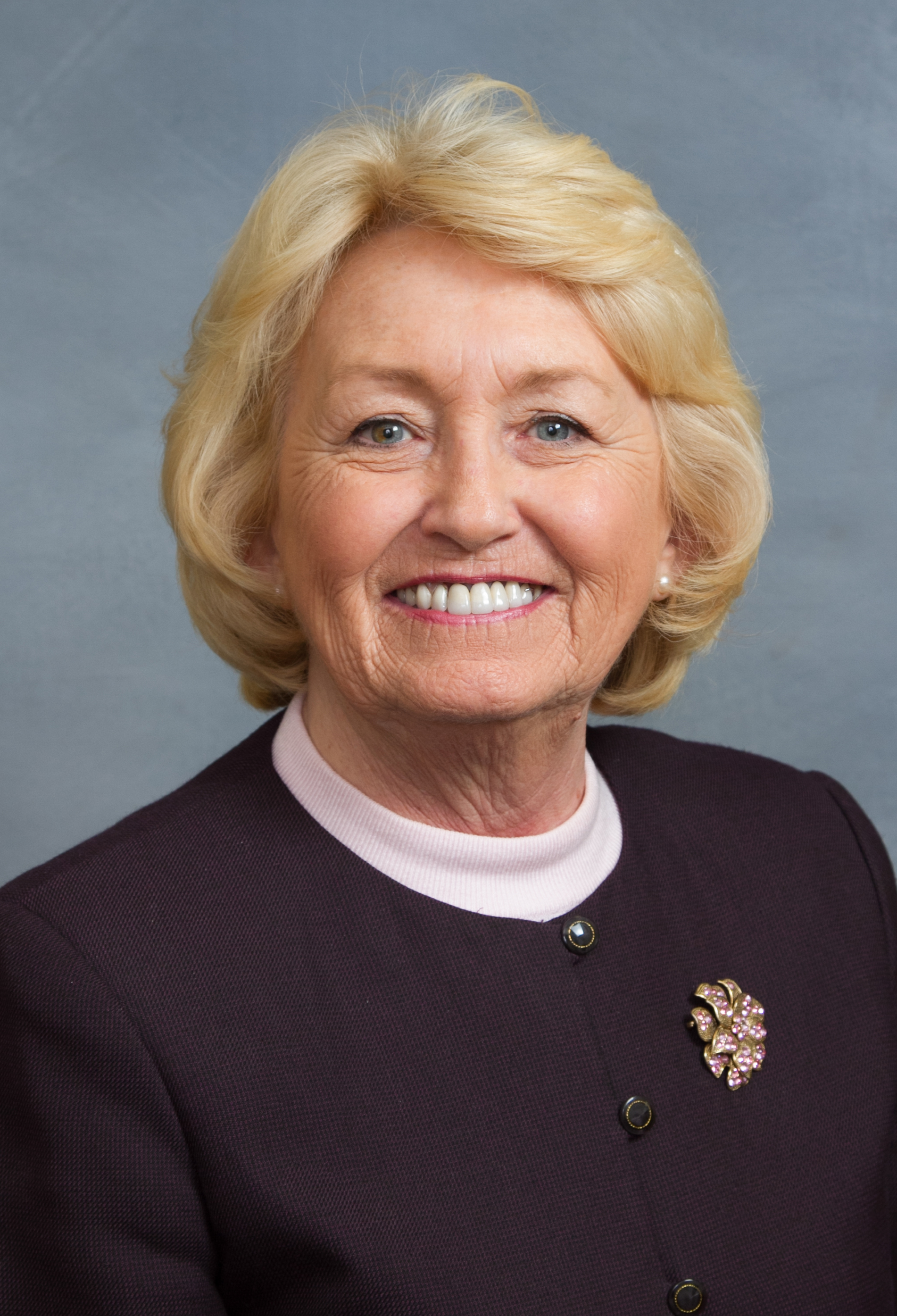

Member of the North Carolina House of Representatives
- In office January 1, 2001 – February 18, 2020
- Preceded by: Len Sossamon
- Succeeded by: Kristin Baker
- Constituency: 90th district (2001–2003); 74th district (2003–2005); 83rd district (2005–2019); 82nd district (2019–2020)

Personal details
- Born: Linda Kay Pennell; May 2, 1945 Cabarrus County, North Carolina, U.S.
- Died: February 18, 2020 (aged 74) Kannapolis, North Carolina, U.S.
- Party: Republican
- Spouse: Ronnie Johnson
- Education: A.L. Brown High School
- Occupation: computer analyst, tax accountant

Linda Kay Pennell Johnson (May 2, 1945 – February 18, 2020) was a computer analyst from Kannapolis, North Carolina who was elected a Republican member of the North Carolina House of Representatives, representing the state's 82nd district.

Johnson graduated from A.L. Brown High School, in Kannapolis, North Carolina, in 1963. She served on the Kannaspolis City Board of Education from 1992 to 2000. She was first elected to the House in 2000, defeating Len Sossamon, who had been appointed to finish Richard Lee Moore's term. She had multiple strokes while suffering from cancer, and died in office in February 2020.

== Electoral history ==
=== 2018 ===
North Carolina House of Representatives 82nd district general election, 2018
Party	Candidate	Votes	%
Republican	Linda Johnson (incumbent)	18,969	52.75%
Democratic	Aimy Steele	16,991	47.25%
Total votes		35,960	100%
Republican hold			

=== 2016 ===
North Carolina House of Representatives 83rd district Republican primary election, 2016
Party	Candidate	Votes	%
Republican	Linda Johnson (incumbent)	5,563	61.52%
Republican	Nathan D. Stone	3,479	38.48%
Total votes		9,042	100%

North Carolina House of Representatives 83rd district general election, 2016
Party	Candidate	Votes	%
Republican	Linda Johnson (incumbent)	22,927	63.10%
Democratic	Jeremy Hachen	13,407	36.90%
Total votes		36,334	100%
Republican hold			

=== 2014 ===
North Carolina House of Representatives 83rd district general election, 2014
Party	Candidate	Votes	%
Republican	Linda Johnson (incumbent)	15,334	100%
Total votes		15,334	100%
Republican hold			

=== 2012 ===
North Carolina House of Representatives 83rd district general election, 2012
Party	Candidate	Votes	%
Republican	Linda Johnson (incumbent)	21,219	63.22%
Democratic	Jerome Fleming	12,347	36.78%
Total votes		33,566	100%
Republican hold			

=== 2010 ===
North Carolina House of Representatives 83rd district general election, 2010
Party	Candidate	Votes	%
Republican	Linda Johnson (incumbent)	17,197	100%
Total votes		17,197	100%
Republican hold			

=== 2008 ===
North Carolina House of Representatives 83rd district general election, 2008
Party	Candidate	Votes	%
Republican	Linda Johnson (incumbent)	22,333	62.46%
Democratic	Barry G. Richards	13,425	37.54%
Total votes		35,758	100%
Republican hold			

=== 2006 ===
North Carolina House of Representatives 83rd district general election, 2006
Party	Candidate	Votes	%
Republican	Linda Johnson (incumbent)	10,947	100%
Total votes		10,947	100%
Republican hold			

=== 2004 ===
North Carolina House of Representatives 83rd district general election, 2004
Party	Candidate	Votes	%
Republican	Linda Johnson (incumbent)	21,648	87.21%
Libertarian	Caroline Gellner	3,176	12.79%
Total votes		24,824	100%
Republican hold			

=== 2002 ===
North Carolina House of Representatives 74th district general section, 2002
Party	Candidate	Votes	%
Republican	Linda Johnson (incumbent)	12,835	65.24%
Democratic	Glenn White	6,243	1.73%
Libertarian	Caroline Gellner	596	3.03%
Total votes		19,674	100%
Republican hold			

=== 2000 ===
North Carolina House of Representatives 90th district general election, 2000
Party	Candidate	Votes	%
Republican	Linda Johnson	13,988	53.77%
Democratic	Len Sossamon (incumbent)	12,025	46.23%
Total votes		26,013	100%
Republican gain from Democratic			

North Carolina House of Representatives
Preceded by Len Sossamon	Member of the North Carolina House of Representatives from the 90th district 2001–2003	Succeeded by Jim Harrell
Preceded by Julia Craven Howard	Member of the North Carolina House of Representatives from the 74th district 2003–2005	Succeeded by Dale Folwell
Preceded by Tracy Walker	Member of the North Carolina House of Representatives from the 83rd district 2005–2019	Succeeded by Larry Pittman
Preceded by Larry Pittman	Member of the North Carolina House of Representatives from the 82nd district 2019–2020	Succeeded by Kristin Baker
