= Dan Kiger =

American politician

Member of the North Carolina House of Representatives from the 90th district
- Incumbent
- Assumed office June 24, 2026
- Preceded by: Sarah Stevens

Personal details
- Party: Republican
- Website: Official website

Dan Kiger is an American politician, currently a Republican member of the North Carolina House of Representatives. He has represented the 90th district since 2026. He was appointed to succeed Sarah Stevens He is a veteran State Highway Patrol trooper and former chairman of the Surry County Republican Party.
