= Grant Campbell (American politician) =

American politician

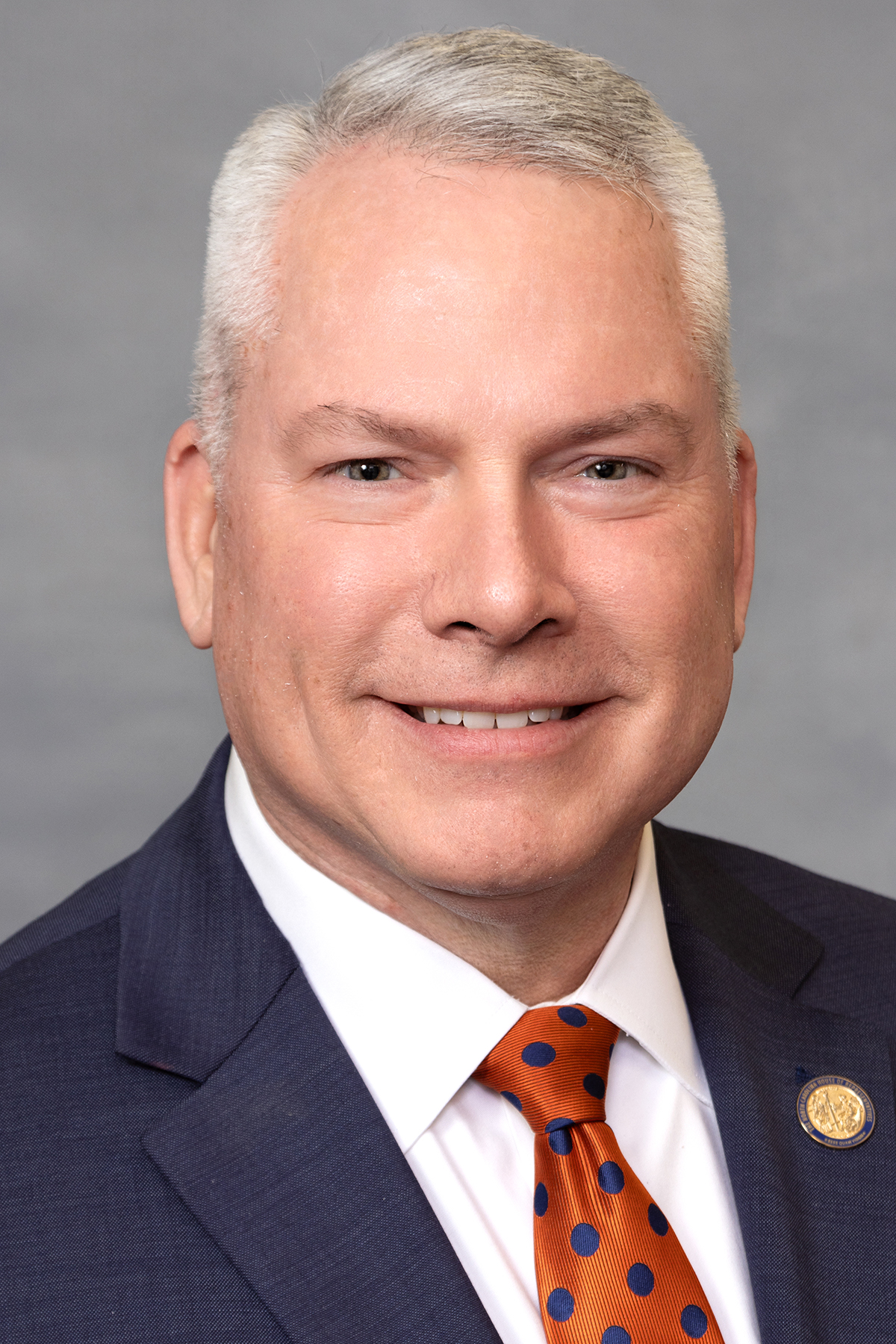

Member of the North Carolina House of Representatives from the 83rd district
- Incumbent
- Assumed office January 1, 2025
- Preceded by: Kevin Crutchfield

Personal details
- Party: Republican
- Website: www.campbellfornc.com

Grant L. Campbell is a Republican member of the North Carolina House of Representatives. He has represented the 83rd district since 2025.

Campbell is a medical doctor.
