= North Carolina's 83rd House district =

American legislative district

North Carolina's 83rd State House of Representatives district
Representative
Grant Campbell; R–Concord
- Demographics: 65% White; 14% Black; 14% Hispanic; 2% Asian; 5% Multiracial
- Population (2024): 92,974

North Carolina's 83rd House district is one of 120 districts in the North Carolina House of Representatives. It has been represented by Republican Grant Campbell since 2025.

== Geography ==
Since 2023, the district has included parts of Rowan and Cabarrus counties. The district overlaps with the 33rd and 34th Senate districts.

== District officeholders ==
Representative	Party	Dates	Notes	Counties
District created January 1, 1993.
Gene McCombs (Faith)	Republican	January 1, 1993 – January 1, 2003	Redistricted to the 76th district.	1993–2003; Part of Rowan County.
Tracy Walker (Wilkesboro)	Republican	January 1, 2003 – January 1, 2005	Redistricted from the 41st district. Redistricted to the 94th district.	2003–2005; All of Wilkes County.
Linda Johnson (Kannapolis)	Republican	January 1, 2005 – January 1, 2019	Redistricted from the 74th district. Redistricted to the 82nd district.	2005–2019; Part of Cabarrus County.
Larry Pittman (Concord)	Republican	January 1, 2019 – January 1, 2023	Redistricted from the 82nd district. Redistricted to the 73rd district and retired.	2019–2021; Parts of Rowan and Cabarrus counties.
Larry Pittman (Concord)	Republican	January 1, 2019 – January 1, 2023	Redistricted from the 82nd district. Redistricted to the 73rd district and retired.	2021–2023; Part of Cabarrus County.
Kevin Crutchfield (Midland)	Republican	January 1, 2023 – January 1, 2025	Redistricted to the 82nd district and lost re-nomination.	2023–Present; Parts of Rowan and Cabarrus counties.
Grant Campbell (Concord)	Republican	January 1, 2025 – Present		2023–Present; Parts of Rowan and Cabarrus counties.

== Election results ==
=== 2024 ===
North Carolina House of Representatives 83rd district Republican primary election, 2024
Party	Candidate	Votes	%
Republican	Grant Campbell	5,032	52.26%
Republican	Brad Jenkins	4,597	47.74%
Total votes		9,629	100%

North Carolina House of Representatives 83rd district general election, 2024
Party	Candidate	Votes	%
Republican	Grant Campbell	30,279	65.68%
Democratic	Joanne Chesley	15,825	34.32%
Total votes		46,104	100%
Republican win (new seat)			

=== 2022 ===
North Carolina House of Representatives 83rd district Republican primary election, 2022
Party	Candidate	Votes	%
Republican	Kevin Crutchfield	4,343	45.06%
Republican	Brad Jenkins	3,124	32.41%
Republican	Grayson Haff	2,171	22.53%
Total votes		9,638	100%

North Carolina House of Representatives 83rd district general election, 2022
Party	Candidate	Votes	%
Republican	Kevin Crutchfield	27,201	100%
Total votes		27,201	100%
Republican win (new seat)			

=== 2020 ===
North Carolina House of Representatives 83rd district Republican primary election, 2020
Party	Candidate	Votes	%
Republican	Larry Pittman (incumbent)	4,798	60.72%
Republican	Jay White	3,104	39.28%
Total votes		7,902	100%

North Carolina House of Representatives 83rd district general election, 2020
Party	Candidate	Votes	%
Republican	Larry Pittman (incumbent)	27,904	51.26%
Democratic	Gail Young	26,534	48.74%
Total votes		54,438	100%
Republican hold			

=== 2018 ===
North Carolina House of Representatives 83rd district Democratic primary election, 2018
Party	Candidate	Votes	%
Democratic	Gail Young	1,048	43.72%
Democratic	Senah Andrews	1,024	42.72%
Democratic	Earle Schecter	325	13.56%
Total votes		2,397	100%

North Carolina House of Representatives 83rd district Republican primary election, 2018
Party	Candidate	Votes	%
Republican	Larry Pittman (incumbent)	2,596	63.61%
Republican	Michael Anderson	1,485	36.39%
Total votes		4,081	100%

North Carolina House of Representatives 83rd district general election, 2018
Party	Candidate	Votes	%
Republican	Larry Pittman (incumbent)	14,798	52.78%
Democratic	Gail Young	13,240	47.22%
Total votes		28,038	100%
Republican hold			

=== 2016 ===
North Carolina House of Representatives 83rd district Republican primary election, 2016
Party	Candidate	Votes	%
Republican	Linda Johnson (incumbent)	5,563	61.52%
Republican	Nathan D. Stone	3,479	38.48%
Total votes		9,042	100%

North Carolina House of Representatives 83rd district general election, 2016
Party	Candidate	Votes	%
Republican	Linda Johnson (incumbent)	22,927	63.10%
Democratic	Jeremy Hachen	13,407	36.90%
Total votes		36,334	100%
Republican hold			

=== 2014 ===
North Carolina House of Representatives 83rd district general election, 2014
Party	Candidate	Votes	%
Republican	Linda Johnson (incumbent)	15,334	100%
Total votes		15,334	100%
Republican hold			

=== 2012 ===
North Carolina House of Representatives 83rd district general election, 2012
Party	Candidate	Votes	%
Republican	Linda Johnson (incumbent)	21,219	63.22%
Democratic	Jerome Fleming	12,347	36.78%
Total votes		33,566	100%
Republican hold			

=== 2010 ===
North Carolina House of Representatives 83rd district general election, 2010
Party	Candidate	Votes	%
Republican	Linda Johnson (incumbent)	17,197	100%
Total votes		17,197	100%
Republican hold			

=== 2008 ===
North Carolina House of Representatives 83rd district Democratic primary election, 2008
Party	Candidate	Votes	%
Democratic	Barry G. Richards	4,140	59.75%
Democratic	John H. Stanley	2,789	40.25%
Total votes		6,929	100%

North Carolina House of Representatives 83rd district general election, 2008
Party	Candidate	Votes	%
Republican	Linda Johnson (incumbent)	22,333	62.46%
Democratic	Barry G. Richards	13,425	37.54%
Total votes		35,758	100%
Republican hold			

=== 2006 ===
North Carolina House of Representatives 83rd district general election, 2006
Party	Candidate	Votes	%
Republican	Linda Johnson (incumbent)	10,947	100%
Total votes		10,947	100%
Republican hold			

=== 2004 ===
North Carolina House of Representatives 83rd district general election, 2004
Party	Candidate	Votes	%
Republican	Linda Johnson (incumbent)	21,648	87.21%
Libertarian	Caroline Gellner	3,176	12.79%
Total votes		24,824	100%
Republican hold			

=== 2002 ===
North Carolina House of Representatives 83rd district Republican primary election, 2002
Party	Candidate	Votes	%
Republican	Tracy Walker (incumbent)	3,181	51.69%
Republican	Roger Smithey	2,973	48.31%
Total votes		6,154	100%

North Carolina House of Representatives 83rd district general election, 2002
Party	Candidate	Votes	%
Republican	Tracy Walker (incumbent)	12,976	64.58%
Democratic	Robert T. Johnston	6,472	32.21%
Libertarian	Pat Kingsbury	646	3.21%
Total votes		20,094	100%
Republican hold			

=== 2000 ===
North Carolina House of Representatives 83rd district Republican primary election, 2000
Party	Candidate	Votes	%
Republican	Gene McCombs (incumbent)	2,594	76.79%
Republican	William Joseph Owens Jr.	784	23.21%
Total votes		3,378	100%

North Carolina House of Representatives 83rd district general election, 2000
Party	Candidate	Votes	%
Republican	Gene McCombs (incumbent)	19,419	100%
Total votes		19,419	100%
Republican hold			
