= Brian Echevarria =

American politician

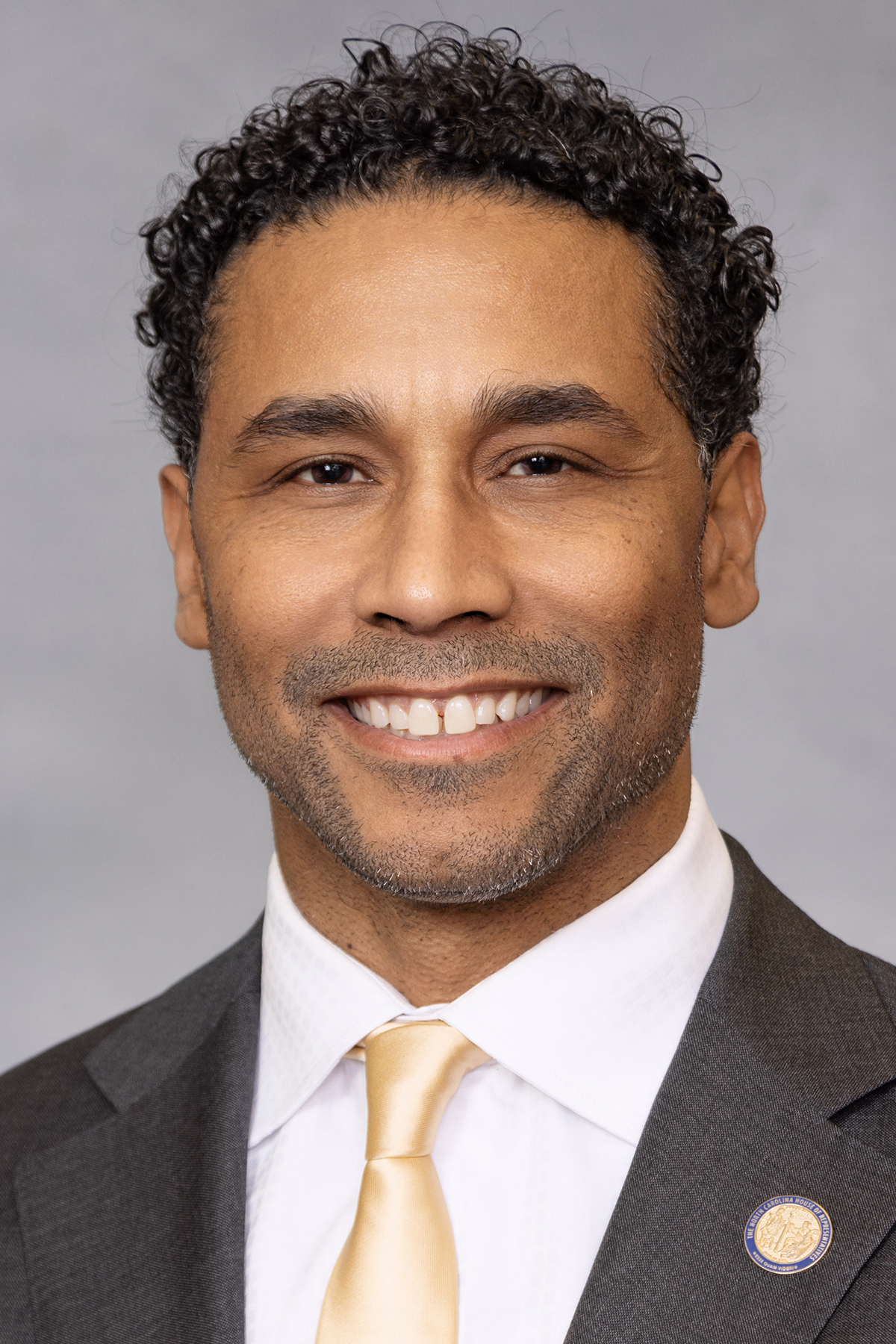

Member of the North Carolina House of Representatives from the 82nd district
- Incumbent
- Assumed office January 1, 2025
- Preceded by: Kevin Crutchfield (Redistricting)

Personal details
- Born: Brian Dwight Echevrria Miami, Florida
- Party: Republican
- Spouse: Cynthia
- Children: 2
- Education: Florida Agricultural and Mechanical University; Florida State University
- Website: brianechevarria.com NCGA website

Brian Echevarria is a Republican member of the North Carolina House of Representatives. He has represented the 82nd district since 2025.

Echevarria is black and Latino, and is a Christian. He previously served as GOP county chairman in Cabarrus County, North Carolina.

== Political career ==
=== Committee Assignments ===
==== 2025–2026 Session ====
- Finance
- Select Committee on Government Efficiency
- Select Committee on Oversight and Reform
- Select Committee on Property Tax Reduction and Reform (Vice Chair)
- Select Committee on Redistricting
- Oversight
- Regulatory Reform
- Transportation

=== Electoral History ===
==== 2024 ====
North Carolina House of Representatives 82nd district Republican primary election, 2024
Party	Candidate	Votes	%
Republican	Brian Echevarria	4,626	50.92%
Republican	Kevin Crutchfield (incumbent)	4,459	49.08%
Total votes		9,085	100%

North Carolina House of Representatives 82nd district general election, 2024
Party	Candidate	Votes	%
Republican	Brian Echevarria	26,965	54.35%
Democratic	Sabrina Berry	22,649	45.65%
Total votes		49,614	100%
Republican hold			

==== 2022 ====
North Carolina House of Representatives 73rd district general election, 2022
Party	Candidate	Votes	%
Democratic	Diamond Staton-Williams	14,108	51.14%
Republican	Brian Echevarria	13,479	48.86%
Total votes		27,587	100%
Democratic gain from Republican			

North Carolina House of Representatives
Preceded by Kristin Baker	Member of the North Carolina House of Representatives from the 82nd district 2025–Present	Incumbent
