= Kevin Crutchfield =

American politician from North Carolina

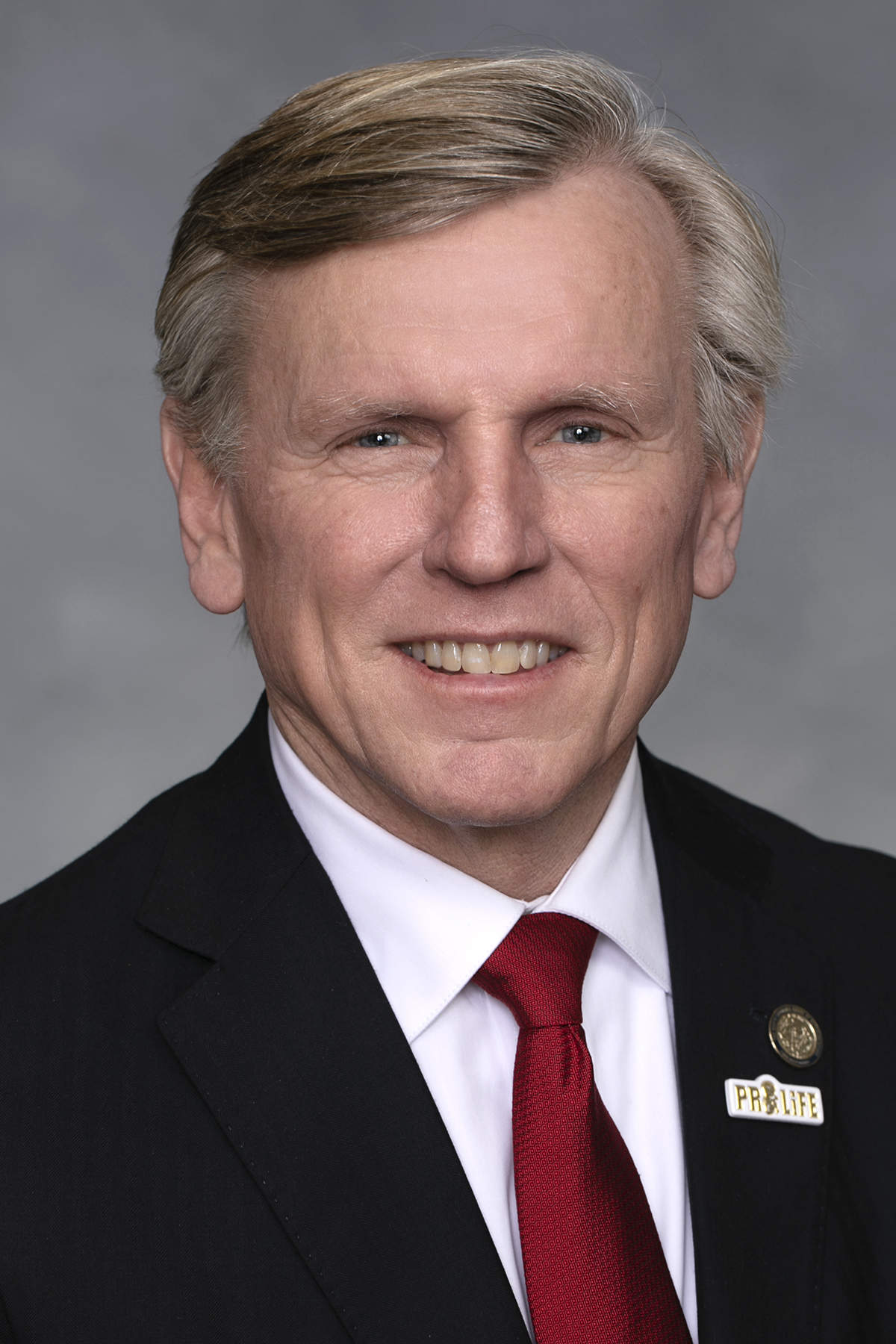

Member of the North Carolina House of Representatives from the 83rd district
- In office January 1, 2023 – January 1, 2025
- Preceded by: Constituency established
- Succeeded by: Brian Echevarria (Redistricting)

Personal details
- Born: Kingston, New York, U.S.
- Party: Republican
- Spouse: Cheryl
- Children: 3
- Education: SUNY Broome Community College; University of North Carolina at Charlotte
- Website: Campaign website

Kevin Crutchfield is an American politician who previously served as a Republican member of the North Carolina House of Representatives from the 83rd district from 2023 to 2025.

== Political career ==
Kevin Crutchfield started his political career by serving on the Cabarrus County Republican Party Executive Committee. He resigned his position to run for office in 2022. During his first term in office WBTV cited multiple sources who confirmed that Rep. Kevin Crutchfield allegedly sought a job in Democratic Governor-Elect Josh Stein's the administration as he considered whether to vote to override the Governor Roy Cooper's veto of a controversial Senate Bill 382. In an email to WBTV on Wednesday, Dec. 11, Crutchfield confirmed that he applied for a job in the administration of Governor-Elect Josh Stein. The Charlotte TV Station reported that several people with knowledge of the House Republican Caucus’s inner workings—each of whom spoke with WBTV on the condition they not be named to discuss internal deliberations—believed Crutchfield had been offered a job in the Stein Administration in exchange for upholding Cooper’s veto of Senate Bill 382. Rep. Crutchfield eventually voted for the override and failed to receive an offer in the Stein administration.

In December 2025, Rep. Crutchfield announced he would file to run for the State Senate seat in District 34.

== Committee Assignments ==
=== 2023–2024 Session ===
- Appropriations
- Appropriations - Education
- Education - Universities
- Health
- Local Government - Land Use, Planning, and Development

== Electoral history ==
=== 2024 ===
North Carolina House of Representatives 82nd district Republican primary election, 2024
Party	Candidate	Votes	%
Republican	Brian Echevarria	4,626	50.92%
Republican	Kevin Crutchfield (incumbent)	4,459	49.08%
Total votes		9,085	100%

=== 2022 ===
North Carolina House of Representatives 83rd district Republican primary election, 2022
Party	Candidate	Votes	%
Republican	Kevin Crutchfield	4,343	45.06%
Republican	Brad Jenkins	3,124	32.41%
Republican	Grayson Haff	2,171	22.53%
Total votes		9,638	100%

North Carolina House of Representatives 83rd district general election, 2022
Party	Candidate	Votes	%
Republican	Kevin Crutchfield	27,201	100%
Total votes		27,201	100%
Republican win (new seat)			

North Carolina House of Representatives
Preceded by Larry Pittman	Member of the North Carolina House of Representatives from the 83rd district 2023–2025	Succeeded by Grant Campbell
