= Larry Pittman =

American politician from North Carolina (born 1954)

Representative Larry Pittman
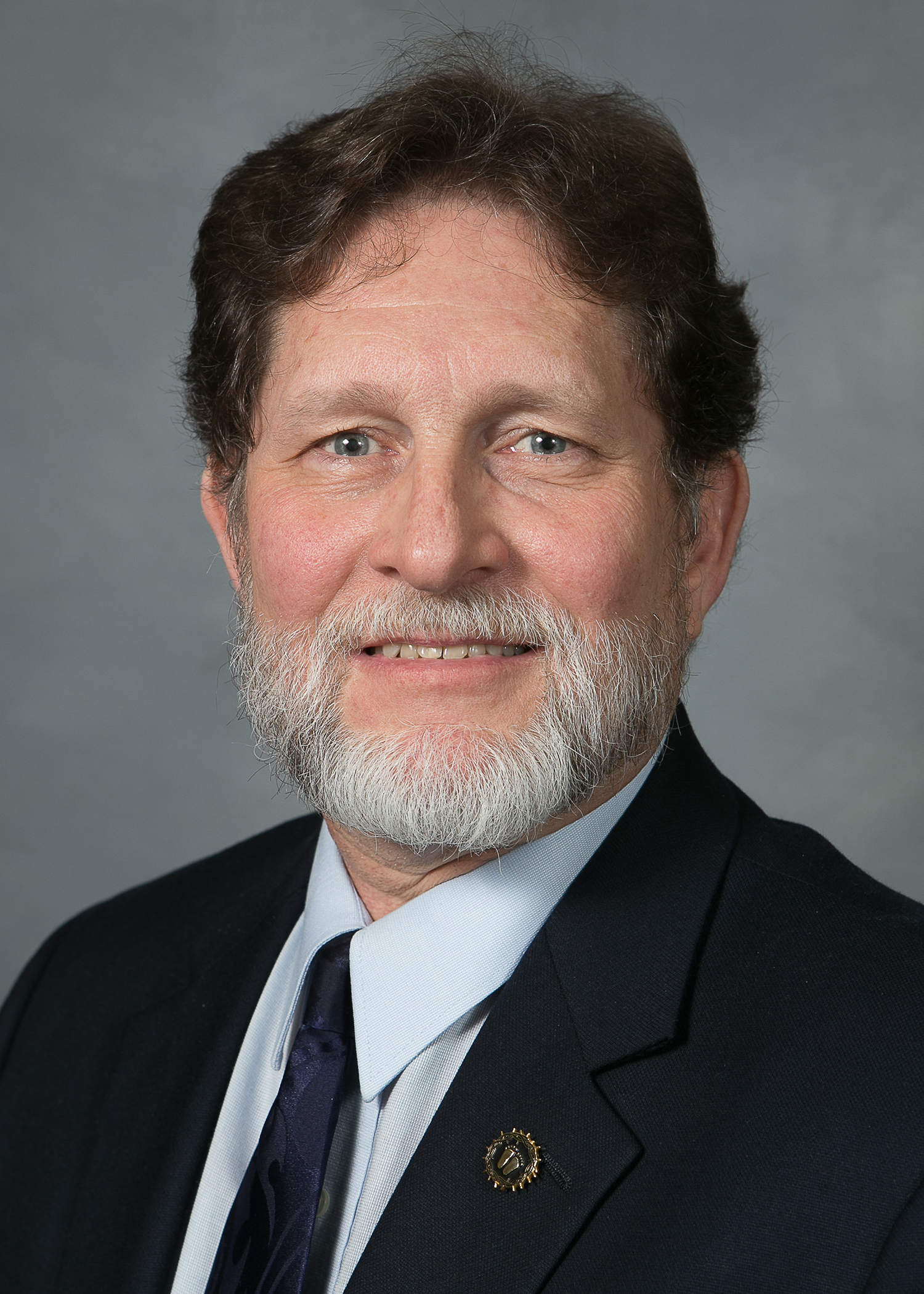

Member of the North Carolina House of Representatives
- In office October 10, 2011 – January 1, 2023
- Preceded by: Jeff Barnhart
- Succeeded by: Diamond Staton-Williams (Redistricting)
- Constituency: 82nd District (2011–2019); 83rd District (2019–2023)

Personal details
- Born: Larry Graham Pittman; September 30, 1954 (age 72) Kinston, North Carolina, U.S.
- Party: Republican
- Spouse: Tammy
- Children: 2
- Education: New Bern High School
- Alma mater: Mount Olive Junior College (AS); Atlantic Christian College (BA); Southeastern Baptist Theological Seminary (MDiv)
- Occupation: Pastor

Larry Graham Pittman (born September 30, 1954) is a former Republican member of the North Carolina House of Representatives. He represented the 83rd district (and the preceding 82nd district) (including constituents in Cabarrus County) from 2011 to 2023.

== North Carolina General Assembly ==
Pittman was first appointed to the North Carolina House of Representatives on October 10, 2011, to replace fellow Republican Jeff Barnhart who resigned to join a consulting firm. Pittman has been re-elected to the seat a total of 5 times, most recently in 2020. On February 4, 2021, Pittman announced that he wouldn't seek re-election in 2022.

In February 2017, Pittman co-sponsored a bill allowing the removal of the ban on North Carolina seceding from the Union ever again. In March 2017 he co-sponsored a bill to invalidate gay marriages in North Carolina. Responding to criticisms to both bills, Pittman made controversial statements that were widely reported in the news media. In March 2016, Pittman was a co-sponsor of North Carolina's bathroom bill.

Honors In 2018, and again in 2020, Pittman was listed as a Champion of the Family in the NC Values Coalition Scorecard.

=== HB 147 ===
In February 2017, Pittman joined with Representatives Michael Speciale (R-Craven) and George Cleveland (R-Jacksonville) in proposing a constitutional amendment that would allow North Carolina voters to repeal Article I, Section 4 of the North Carolina Constitution. This article declares that "This State shall ever remain a member of the American Union; the people thereof are part of the American nation," and prohibits the state from seceding from the United States of America; its inclusion in North Carolina’s 1868 constitution was a condition for being readmitted into the Union after the Civil War. The bill passed the first reading on February 22, 2017, and was referred to the Committee on Rules, Calendar, and Operations of the House.

=== HB 780 ===
Pittman, Speciale, and Representative Carl Ford (R-China Grove) sponsored House Bill 780, which was introduced on March 14, 2017. This bill would end North Carolina's recognition of same sex marriage in disregard of the US Supreme Court ruling in Obergefell v. Hodges and cites the Bible as justification for this disregard. The bill passed the first reading on April 13, 2017, and was referred to the Committee on Rules, Calendar, and Operations of the House. On the same day, however, state house speaker Tim Moore stated that the bill would not proceed further due to concerns about its constitutionality. In North Carolina, it is a common practice for bills that lack the support of party leadership to be sent to the Rules Committee to die.

=== HB 158 ===
In February 2021, Pittman and North Carolina House Representative Mark Brody introduced House Bill 158, which aimed to classify abortion as first-degree murder.

== Controversial statements ==
On March 22, 2017, Pittman posted a newsletter on his Facebook page, giving his constituents an update on his activities. Numerous constituents posted comments, and Pittman responded with controversial statements.

=== U.S. Supreme Court opinion ===
In response to a commenter's criticism of HB 780, Pittman posted a comment on April 11, 2017, stating that North Carolina should uphold traditional marriage "in spite of the opinion of a federal court that had no business interfering."

=== Lincoln-Hitler comparison ===
Pittman's post in reference to the U.S. Supreme Court led to several comments on states' rights and a post telling Pittman that the Civil War was over, the Union had won, and to "get over it". Pittman responded in a post on April 12, 2017, saying: "And if Hitler had won, should the world just get over it? Lincoln was the same sort if [sic] tyrant, and personally responsible for the deaths of over 800,000 Americans in a war that was unnecessary and unconstitutional." He later deleted the post.

=== Climate change statement ===
In July 2012, Pittman issued a statement rejecting the scientific consensus on climate change: "Our climate runs on a cycle. It goes up and it goes down and the Lord designed it that way. And the main thing that causes global warming is the Earth's relationship to a big ball of gas that's burning out there that we call the Sun. And it is the height of hubris for human beings to think that we can have any effect on that."

=== Appropriate use of force ===
In a June 2020 Facebook post, during the nationwide protests following the murder of George Floyd, Pittman called protesters "vermin" and "thugs" and opined that if they "resist and attack" police should shoot them.

=== Juneteenth Comments ===
In a June 2026 Cabarrus County commissioners meeting, during a vote on acknowledging Juneteenth, Pittman stated his belief that the history of Juneteenth was "a lie." Pittman further claimed that the true date marking the end of slavery was December 18, the date of the ratification of the Thirteenth Amendment to the United States Constitution. After an argument with an audience member, Pittman called an attendee "boy." Pittman later apologized.

== Electoral history ==
=== 2020 ===
North Carolina House of Representatives 83rd district Republican primary election, 2020
| Party | Candidate | Votes | % |
|---|---|---|---|
| Republican | Larry Pittman (incumbent) | 4,798 | 60.72% |
| Republican | Jay White | 3,104 | 39.28% |
| Total votes | | 7,902 | 100% |

North Carolina House of Representatives 83rd district general election, 2020
| Party | Candidate | Votes | % |
|---|---|---|---|
| Republican | Larry Pittman (incumbent) | 27,904 | 51.26% |
| Democratic | Gail Young | 26,534 | 48.74% |
| Total votes | | 54,438 | 100% |
| Republican hold | | | |

=== 2018 ===
North Carolina House of Representatives 83rd district Republican primary election, 2018
| Party | Candidate | Votes | % |
|---|---|---|---|
| Republican | Larry Pittman (incumbent) | 2,596 | 63.61% |
| Republican | Michael Anderson | 1,485 | 36.39% |
| Total votes | | 4,081 | 100% |

North Carolina House of Representatives 83rd district general election, 2018
| Party | Candidate | Votes | % |
|---|---|---|---|
| Republican | Larry Pittman (incumbent) | 14,798 | 52.78% |
| Democratic | Gail Young | 13,240 | 47.22% |
| Total votes | | 28,038 | 100% |
| Republican hold | | | |

=== 2016 ===
North Carolina House of Representatives 82nd district Republican primary election, 2016
| Party | Candidate | Votes | % |
|---|---|---|---|
| Republican | Larry Pittman (incumbent) | 5,672 | 52.82% |
| Republican | Michael Fischer | 5,066 | 47.18% |
| Total votes | | 10,738 | 100% |

North Carolina House of Representatives 82nd district general election, 2016
| Party | Candidate | Votes | % |
|---|---|---|---|
| Republican | Larry Pittman (incumbent) | 24,636 | 57.92% |
| Democratic | Earle Schecter | 17,900 | 42.08% |
| Total votes | | 42,536 | 100% |
| Republican hold | | | |

=== 2014 ===
North Carolina House of Representatives 82nd district Republican primary election, 2014
| Party | Candidate | Votes | % |
|---|---|---|---|
| Republican | Larry Pittman (incumbent) | 3,082 | 62.22% |
| Republican | Leigh Thomas Brown | 1,871 | 37.78% |
| Total votes | | 4,953 | 100% |

North Carolina House of Representatives 82nd district general election, 2014
| Party | Candidate | Votes | % |
|---|---|---|---|
| Republican | Larry Pittman (incumbent) | 13,818 | 59.50% |
| Democratic | Earle H. Schecter | 9,404 | 40.50% |
| Total votes | | 23,222 | 100% |
| Republican hold | | | |

=== 2012 ===
North Carolina House of Representatives 82nd district Republican primary election, 2012
| Party | Candidate | Votes | % |
|---|---|---|---|
| Republican | Larry Pittman (incumbent) | 4,292 | 51.46% |
| Republican | Jay White | 4,049 | 48.54% |
| Total votes | | 8,341 | 100% |

North Carolina House of Representatives 82nd district general election, 2012
| Party | Candidate | Votes | % |
|---|---|---|---|
| Republican | Larry Pittman (incumbent) | 24,674 | 100% |
| Total votes | | 24,674 | 100% |
| Republican hold | | | |

=== 2010 ===
North Carolina House of Representatives 82nd district Republican primary election, 2010
| Party | Candidate | Votes | % |
|---|---|---|---|
| Republican | Jeff Barnhart (incumbent) | 2,955 | 59.40% |
| Republican | Larry Pittman | 2,020 | 40.60% |
| Total votes | | 4,975 | 100% |

=== 2008 ===
North Carolina House of Representatives 82nd district Republican primary election, 2008
| Party | Candidate | Votes | % |
|---|---|---|---|
| Republican | Jeff Barnhart (incumbent) | 2,747 | 57.67% |
| Republican | Larry Pittman | 2,016 | 42.33% |
| Total votes | | 4,763 | 100% |

== Publications ==
- Pittman, Larry G. (2024). Revelations about Revelation: An Explanation of the Apocalypse of John for the Layman. Covenant Books. ISBN 9798891122352.

North Carolina House of Representatives
| Preceded by Jeff Barnhart | Member of the North Carolina House of Representatives from the 82nd district 2011–2019 | Succeeded by Linda Johnson |
| Preceded by Linda Johnson | Member of the North Carolina House of Representatives from the 83rd district 2019–2023 | Succeeded by Kevin Crutchfield |
