= Kristin Baker (politician) =

American politician (born 1963)

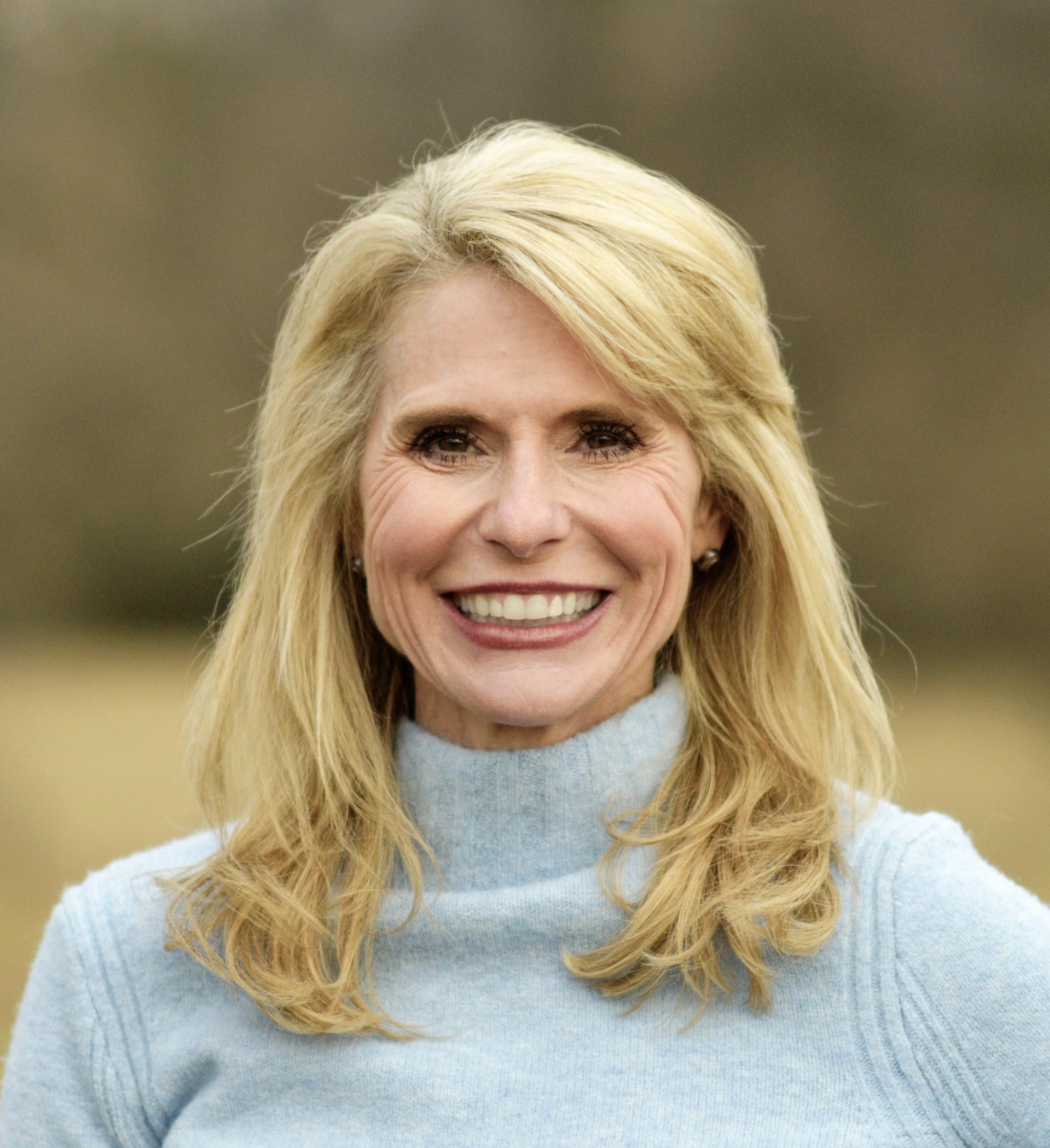

Member of the North Carolina House of Representatives from the 82nd district
- In office March 19, 2020 – January 1, 2025
- Preceded by: Linda Johnson
- Succeeded by: Jonathan Almond (Redistricting)

Personal details
- Born: Kristin Leah Dutrow; 1963 (age 62–63)
- Party: Republican
- Spouse: Scott Baker
- Education: University of North Carolina at Chapel Hill (BS, MD)
- Occupation: Psychiatrist

Kristin Dutrow Baker (born 1963) is a Republican former member of the North Carolina House of Representatives. She represented the 82nd district (including constituents in Cabarrus County) from her initial appointment in March 2020 until 2025.

== Life and career ==
Baker earned her bachelor's degree in 1985 from the University of North Carolina at Chapel Hill as a Morehead-Cain Scholar, and her medical degree in 1989 from the University of North Carolina at Chapel Hill School of Medicine. Baker practices psychiatry in Concord, North Carolina.

== Committee assignments ==
=== 2023–2024 session ===
- Appropriations (Vice Chair)
- Appropriations - Health and Human Services (Chair)
- Health (Chair)
- Education - Universities
- Families, Children, and Aging Policy
- Insurance
- Election Law and Campaign Finance Reform

=== 2021–2022 session ===
- Appropriations (Vice Chair)
- Appropriations - Health and Human Services (Chair)
- Health (Chair)
- Education - Universities
- Families, Children, and Aging Policy
- Insurance
- UNC BOG Nominations

== Electoral history ==
=== 2022 ===
North Carolina House of Representatives 82nd district general election, 2022
Party	Candidate	Votes	%
Republican	Kristin Baker (incumbent)	19,935	100%
Total votes		19,935	100%
Republican hold			

=== 2020 ===
North Carolina House of Representatives 82nd district Republican primary election, 2020
Party	Candidate	Votes	%
Republican	Kristin Baker	3,861	54.07%
Republican	William G. Hamby Jr.	2,061	28.86%
Republican	Parish Moffitt	1,219	17.07%
Total votes		7,141	100%

North Carolina House of Representatives 82nd district general election, 2020
Party	Candidate	Votes	%
Republican	Kristin Baker (incumbent)	25,817	53.00%
Democratic	Aimy Steele	22,898	47.00%
Total votes		48,715	100%
Republican hold			

North Carolina House of Representatives
Preceded by Linda Johnson	Member of the North Carolina House of Representatives from the 82nd district 2020–2025	Succeeded by Brian Echevarria
