= Jeffrey L. Barnhart =

American politician

Member of the North Carolina House of Representatives from the 82nd district
- In office 2001-2011
- Preceded by: Tim Tallent
- Succeeded by: Larry Pittman

Personal details
- Born: March 5, 1956 (age 70) Waverly, New York, U.S.
- Party: Republican
- Education: Southern Illinois University (BA)

Jeffrey L. Barnhart (born March 5, 1956) was a Republican member of the North Carolina General Assembly representing the state's Eighty-second House District, including constituents in Cabarrus County. A businessman, Barnhart served in the state's House of Representatives from 2001 to 2011. He resigned in 2011 to join the consulting firm McGuireWoods.

== Personal life ==
Barnhart was born in Waverly, New York to Fred Harrison and Mildred Lorraine Sjostrom Barnhart. He and his wife Jody (Springston) have four children.

== Education ==
Barnhart graduated from Waverly High School in 1974. He then attended Southern Illinois University and earned a Bachelor of Science degree in Industrial Technology in 1981.

== Military service ==
Barnhart served in the United States Air Force from 1978 to 1982.

== Early Political career ==
- Cabarrus County Commissioner – 10 years
- Acting County Manager – Cabarrus County – 8 months
- Cabarrus Economic Development Board of Directors – 9 years
- Water & Sewer Authority of Cabarrus County – 6 years
