= Len Sossamon =

American real estate developer and politician

Member of the North Carolina House of Representatives from the 90th district
- In office May 17, 2000 – January 1, 2001
- Appointed by: Jim Hunt
- Preceded by: Richard Moore
- Succeeded by: Linda Johnson

Personal details
- Born: Leonard Brown Sossamon Jr. 1950 or 1951 (age 75–76)
- Party: Democratic
- Education: University of North Carolina at Charlotte (BA, MS)

Leonard Brown Sossamon Jr. is an American real estate developer, county administrator, and politician. He was appointed to the North Carolina House of Representatives in 2000 but lost election to a full term by Linda P. Johnson later that year.

Sossamon served as county administrator of Hernando County, Florida from 2012 to 2019.

== Electoral history ==
=== 2000 ===
North Carolina House of Representatives 90th district general election, 2000
Party	Candidate	Votes	%
Republican	Linda Johnson	13,988	53.77%
Democratic	Len Sossamon (incumbent)	12,025	46.23%
Total votes		26,013	100%
Republican gain from Democratic			

North Carolina House of Representatives
Preceded by Richard Moore	Member of the North Carolina House of Representatives from the 90th district 2000–2001	Succeeded by Linda Jonson
