= James A. Harrell III =

American politician from North Carolina

Jim Harrell
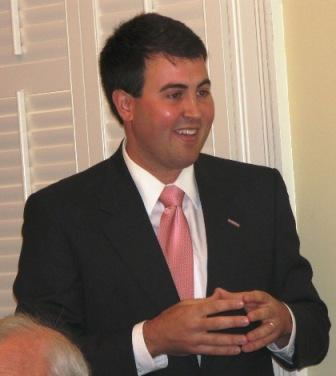

Member of the North Carolina House of Representatives from the 90th district
- In office January 1, 2003 – January 1, 2009
- Preceded by: Constituency established
- Succeeded by: Sarah Stevens

Personal details
- Born: James Andrew Harrell III; October 8, 1974 (age 51) Elkin, North Carolina, U.S.
- Party: Democratic
- Education: Hampden–Sydney College (BA); Emory University (JD)

James Andrew "Jim" Harrell III (born October 8, 1974 in Elkin, North Carolina) served three terms as a Democratic member of the North Carolina General Assembly representing the state's ninetieth House district, including constituents in Alleghany and Surry counties. As of 2011, Harrell is a lobbyist, running his own firm, James A. Harrell III and Associates, LLC, in Raleigh.

== Early life and education ==
Harrell earned the Eagle Scout designation as a youth, like many members of his family. Harrell is a graduate of Hampden–Sydney College and the Emory University School of Law. While a law student, Harrell worked for the District Attorney's office in Fulton County, Georgia. He also served as a law clerk for North Carolina Supreme Court justice Franklin Freeman.

== Political career ==
Harrell was elected to the House in 2002 and re-elected in 2004. He was elected to a third term on November 7, 2006 with over 60 percent of the vote. In 2008, he was narrowly defeated for re-election by Republican Sarah Stevens.

During his final term, the 2007-2008 session, Harrell was chairman of both the House committees on Ways and Means and on Pensions and Retirement. He served as chairman of the Environment and Natural Resources committee in his second term and of Judiciary Committee II in the second half of his first term. Harrell also chaired or co-chaired select committees on Economic Development and on the rural economy in 2006.

While serving in the legislature, Harrell founded a summer program to teach high school students about government and politics, named the James A. Harrell Jr. School of Government, after his father, a Surry County commissioner and candidate for the U.S. House of Representatives in 2004.

== Electoral history ==
=== 2008 ===
North Carolina House of Representatives 90th district general election, 2008
Party	Candidate	Votes	%
Republican	Sarah Stevens	13,263	50.58%
Democratic	Jim Harrell (incumbent)	12,957	49.42%
Total votes		26,220	100%
Republican gain from Democratic			

=== 2006 ===
North Carolina House of Representatives 90th district general election, 2006
Party	Candidate	Votes	%
Democratic	Jim Harrell (incumbent)	9,533	60.93%
Republican	Jack Conway	6,114	39.07%
Total votes		15,647	100%
Democratic hold			

=== 2004 ===
North Carolina House of Representatives 90th district general election, 2004
Party	Candidate	Votes	%
Democratic	Jim Harrell (incumbent)	13,374	57.97%
Republican	Jack Conaway	9,698	42.03%
Total votes		23,072	100%
Democratic hold			

=== 2002 ===
North Carolina House of Representatives 90th district Democratic primary election, 2002
Party	Candidate	Votes	%
Democratic	Jim Harrell	3,282	57.25%
Democratic	Melvin T. Jackson	1,457	25.41%
Democratic	Todd Harris	994	17.34%
Total votes		5,733	100%

North Carolina House of Representatives 90th district general election, 2002
Party	Candidate	Votes	%
Democratic	Jim Harrell	9,395	52.75%
Republican	R. F. Buck Golding	8,415	47.25%
Total votes		17,810	100%
Democratic win (new seat)			

North Carolina House of Representatives
Preceded by Linda Johnson	Member of the North Carolina House of Representatives from the 90th district 2003–2009	Succeeded by Sarah Stevens
