= 2026 North Carolina judicial elections =

2026 North Carolina Supreme Court election
- November 3, 2026

1 of 7 seat of the Supreme Court of North Carolina
	Majority party	Minority party
Party	Republican	Democratic
Last election	2 seats	0 seats
Seats before	5	2
Seats won	0	1
Seats after	5	2
Seat change	Steady	Steady

One justice of the seven-member North Carolina Supreme Court and three judges of the fifteen-member North Carolina Court of Appeals were elected by North Carolina voters on November 3, 2026, concurrently with other state elections. Terms for seats on each court are eight years. These elections were conducted on a partisan basis.

Primary elections (for seats with more than one candidate from a political party) were held on March 3, 2026.

According to unofficial, preliminary results, the Democratic nominees for each of the four seats won handily.

== Supreme Court Seat 1 ==
2026 North Carolina Supreme Court Associate Justice seat 1 election
- November 3, 2026
Candidate	Anita Earls	Sarah Stevens
Party	Democratic	Republican
Popular vote	2,456,852	1,717,053
Percentage	58.86%	41.14%
Associate Justice before election
Anita Earls
Democratic
Elected Associate Justice
Anita Earls
Democratic

Justice Anita Earls is the incumbent.

During the 2026 NC Judicial Candidates Forum, Sarah Stevens characterized herself as a "constitutional conservative" and "a law and order person." Anita Earls stated that she is "not beholden to any particular political ideology" and that her goal is to make sure that "we protect everyone's rights under the state and federal constitutions" and "guarantee equal justice under the law for all the citizens of North Carolina."

=== Democratic primary ===
==== Nominee ====
- Anita Earls, incumbent justice

=== Republican primary ===
==== Nominee ====
- Sarah Stevens, attorney and state representative (2009–2026)

=== General election ===
==== Endorsements ====
Anita Earls (D)

Federal officials

- Barack Obama, former President of the United States (2009–2017)
- Eric Holder, former United States Attorney General (2009–2015)

Statewide officials

- Roy Cooper, former governor of North Carolina (2017–2025)

Labor unions

- North Carolina AFL-CIO
- Communications Workers of America
- North Carolina Association of Educators
- United Electrical, Radio and Machine Workers of America Local 150

Organizations

- EMILY's List
- Equality North Carolina PAC
- Feminist Majority Equality PAC
- National Organization for Women North Carolina PAC
- North Carolina League of Conservation Voters Conservation PAC
- Planned Parenthood Votes! South Atlantic
- Red Wine & Blue
- Reproductive Freedom for All
- Sierra Club North Carolina

Newspapers and other media

- The Charlotte Observer
- The Charlotte Post
Sarah Stevens (R)

Federal officials

- Virginia Foxx, U.S. representative for North Carolina's 5th congressional district

State legislators

- Destin Hall, speaker of the North Carolina House of Representatives

Organizations

- National Rifle Association Political Victory Fund
- North Carolina Fraternal Order of Police

==== Polling ====
Poll source	Date(s) administered	Sample size (Note: Key: A – all adults RV – registered voters LV – likely voters V – unclear)	Margin of error	Anita Earls (D)	Sarah Stevens (R)	Other	Undecided
Harper Polling (R) (Note: Poll sponsored by The Carolina Journal.)	October 18–20, 2026	600 (LV)	± 4.0%	47%	40%	—	13%
High Point University/YouGov	October 1–20, 2026	620 (LV)	± 4.7%	51%	43%	—	6%
Change Research (D) (Note: Poll sponsored by Carolina Forward)	October 1–7, 2026	829 (LV)	± 3.7%	50%	41%	—	9%
Catawba College/YouGov	September 4–15, 2026	885 (LV)	–	44%	36%	1% (Note: "I would not vote in the N.C. Supreme Court race" with 1%)	19%
High Point University	September 9–16, 2026	813 (RV)	± 3.8%	43%	41%	3% (Note: "Another candidate" with 3%)	13%
High Point University	September 9–16, 2026	706 (LV)	± 3.9%	46%	44%	3% (Note: "Another candidate" with 3%)	8%
Harper Polling (R)	September 13–15, 2026	608 (LV)	± 4.0%	47%	36%	–	16%
YouGov (Note: Poll sponsored by High Point University.)	August 3–12, 2026	660 (LV)	± 3.8%	47%	44%	1% (Note: "Someone else/another party" with 1%)	8%
YouGov	August 3–12, 2026	800 (RV)	± 3.5%	44%	41%	2% (Note: "Someone else/another party" with 2%)	14%
Harper Polling (R)	August 9–10, 2026	600 (LV)	± 4.0%	43%	40%	3% (Note: "Someone else" with 3%)	14%
Change Research (D)	July 29 – August 1, 2026	967 (LV)	± 3.4%	45%	39%	–	16%
Public Policy Polling (D)	July 10–11, 2026	759 (LV)	± 3.6%	44%	42%	–	14%
YouGov (Note: Poll sponsored by Catawba College.)	June 1–10, 2026	906 (LV)	± 3.8%	40%	35%	4% (Note: "Would not vote" with 4%)	21%
Harper Polling (R)	May 10–11, 2026	600 (LV)	± 4.0%	41%	36%	5% (Note: "Someone else" with 5%)	18%
Change Research (D)	May 4–8, 2026	957 (LV)	± 3.3%	44%	40%	–	16%
YouGov	March 26 – April 6, 2026	703 (LV)	± 3.7%	43%	43%	2%	13%
YouGov	March 26 – April 6, 2026	800 (RV)	± 4.1%	42%	40%	2%	16%
Harper Polling (R)	March 22–23, 2026	600 (LV)	± 4.0%	41%	38%	3%	18%
Public Policy Polling (D)	March 13–14, 2026	556 (V)	± 4.2%	43%	40%	–	17%
Change Research (D)	January 31 – February 4, 2026	1,069 (V)	± 3.1%	45%	43%	–	12%
Change Research (D)	January 5–7, 2026	1,105 (LV)	± 3.5%	41%	42%	–	17%

==== Results ====
2026 North Carolina Supreme Court Associate Justice Seat 1 election
Party	Candidate	Votes	%
Democratic	Anita Earls (incumbent)	2,456,843	58.86%
Republican	Sarah Stevens	1,717,025	41.14%
Total votes		4,173,905	100.0%
Democratic hold			

== Court of Appeals Seat 1 ==
Judge John S. Arrowood is the incumbent.

=== Democratic primary ===
==== Nominee ====
- John S. Arrowood, incumbent judge

=== Republican primary ===
==== Nominee ====
- Michael C. Byrne, administrative law judge

==== Eliminated in primary ====
- Matt Smith, Union County Superior Court judge (Judicial District 20B)

==== Endorsements ====
Michael C. Byrne

Newspapers

- The News & Observer (Republican primary only)

==== Results ====
Republican primary
Party	Candidate	Votes	%
Republican	Michael Byrne	301,730	51.54
Republican	Matt Smith	283,660	48.46
Total votes		585,390	100.0

=== General election ===
==== Polling ====
Poll source	Date(s) administered	Sample size	Margin of error	John Arrowood (D)	Michael Byrne (R)	Undecided
Public Policy Polling (D)	July 10–11, 2026	759 (LV)	± 3.6%	40%	41%	19%
Public Policy Polling (D)	March 13–14, 2026	556 (V)	± 4.2%	43%	40%	17%

==== Results ====
2026 North Carolina Court of Appeals Seat 1 election
Party	Candidate	Votes	%
Democratic	John Arrowood (incumbent)	2,362,168	56.77%
Republican	Michael Byrne	1,798,829	43.23%
Total votes		4,160,997	100.0%
Democratic hold			

== Court of Appeals Seat 2 ==
Judge Toby Hampson is the incumbent.

=== Democratic primary ===
==== Nominee ====
- Toby Hampson, incumbent judge

=== Republican primary ===
==== Nominee ====
- George Bell, Mecklenburg County Superior Court judge (Judicial District 26C)

=== General election ===
==== Polling ====
Poll source	Date(s) administered	Sample size	Margin of error	Toby Hampson (D)	George Bell (R)	Undecided
Public Policy Polling (D)	July 10–11, 2026	759 (LV)	± 3.6%	40%	43%	17%
Public Policy Polling (D)	March 13–14, 2026	556 (V)	± 4.2%	41%	43%	16%

==== Results ====
2026 North Carolina Court of Appeals Seat 2 election
Party	Candidate	Votes	%
Democratic	Toby Hampson (incumbent)	2,360,509	56.79%
Republican	George Bell	1,796,406	43.21%
Total votes		4,156,915	100.0%
Democratic hold			

== Court of Appeals Seat 3 ==
Judge Allegra Collins is the incumbent.

=== Democratic primary ===
==== Nominee ====
- Christine Walczyk, Wake County District Court judge (Judicial District 10C)

==== Eliminated in primary ====
- James Whalen, attorney at Brooks Pierce LLP

===== Declined =====
- Allegra Collins, incumbent judge

==== Endorsements ====
Christine Walczyk

Newspapers

- The News & Observer (Democratic primary only)

==== Results ====
Democratic primary
Party	Candidate	Votes	%
Democratic	Christine Walczyk	492,809	62.33
Democratic	James Whalen	297,780	37.67
Total votes		788,130	100.0

=== Republican primary ===
==== Nominee ====
- Craig Collins, Gaston County Superior Court judge (Judicial District 27A)

=== General election ===
==== Polling ====
Poll source	Date(s) administered	Sample size	Margin of error	Christine Walczyk (D)	Craig Collins (R)	Undecided
Public Policy Polling (D)	July 10–11, 2026	759 (LV)	± 3.6%	41%	41%	18%
Public Policy Polling (D)	March 13–14, 2026	556 (V)	± 4.2%	42%	41%	17%

==== Results ====
2026 North Carolina Court of Appeals Seat 3 election
Party	Candidate	Votes	%
Democratic	Christine Walczyk	2,372,422	57.12%
Republican	Craig Collins	1,780,905	42.88%
Total votes		4,153,327	100.0%
Democratic hold			

== See also ==
- 2026 North Carolina elections
