= Richard Lee Moore =

American teacher and politician from North Carolina

Richard Moore

Member of the North Carolina House of Representatives from the 90th district
- In office January 1, 1997 – May 7, 2000
- Preceded by: Robin Hayes
- Succeeded by: Len Sossamon

Personal details
- Born: Richard Lee Moore; January 14, 1971 (age 55) Kannapolis, North Carolina, U.S.
- Party: Democratic
- Spouse: Caroline Ramseur (m. 1999, divorced)
- Education: Duke University (BA)

Richard Lee Moore (born January 14, 1971) is an American former teacher and politician. He was elected twice to the North Carolina House of Representatives, where he chaired the Committee on Aging and Education Subcommittee on Pre-School, Elementary and Secondary Education, before resigning in 2000 following his indictment on sex crime charges.

Moore succeeded Robin Hayes, who was the Republican nominee for Governor in 1996, and he won reelection two years later. He voluntarily resigned his position at A.L. Brown High School and surrendered his teaching license following an indictment by a Cabarrus Country grand jury on five counts of crimes against nature and one count of attempted second-degree forcible sexual offense against a 16-year old former student. After resigning, he served as a youth minister at a Kannapolis church. Leonard B. Sossamon Jr. was appointed to succeed Moore when he resigned from the House months later.

North Carolina House of Representatives
Preceded by Robin Hayes	Member of the North Carolina House of Representatives from the 90th district 1997–2000	Succeeded by Len Sossamon
