= Sarah Stevens (politician) =

American politician (born 1960)

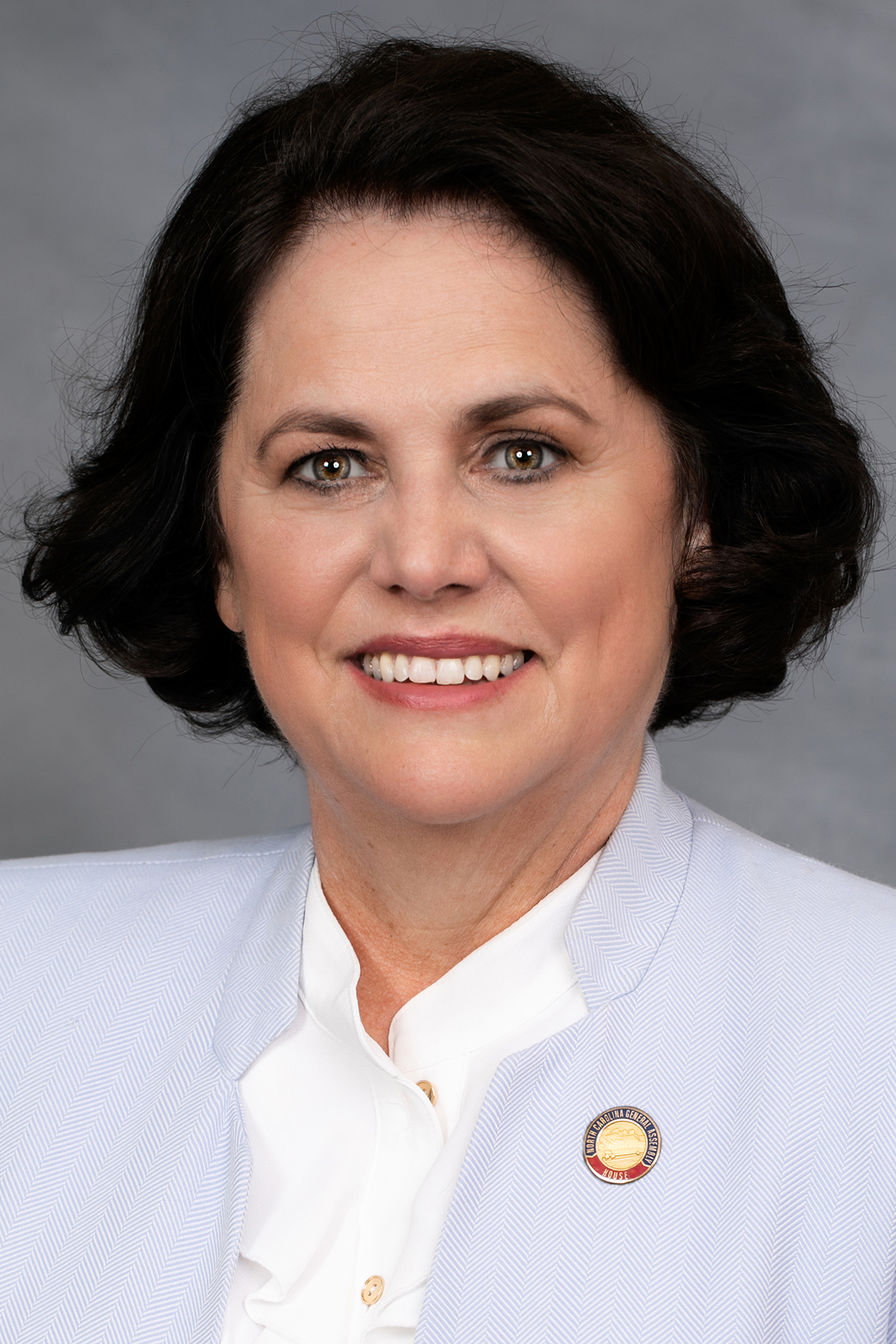

Speaker pro tempore of the North Carolina House of Representatives
- In office January 1, 2017 – January 8, 2025
- Preceded by: Paul Stam
- Succeeded by: Mitchell Setzer

Member of the North Carolina House of Representatives from the 90th district
- In office January 1, 2009 – June 16, 2026
- Preceded by: Jim Harrell
- Succeeded by: Dan Kiger

Personal details
- Born: February 15, 1960 (age 66) Mount Airy, North Carolina, U.S.
- Party: Republican
- Spouse: Edwin
- Education: University of North Carolina, Greensboro (BS); Campbell University (JD)
- Website: State House website

Sarah Suzanne Stevens (born February 15, 1960) is a former Republican member of the North Carolina House of Representatives. She represented the 90th district (including constituents in Surry and Wilkes counties) from 2009 to 2026 and served as speaker pro tempore from 2017 to 2025. Stevens resigned from the chamber in order to focus on her campaign for a seat on the North Carolina Supreme Court in the 2026 elections.

== Awards ==
- 2015 Champion for Children Award. Presented by Children’s Hope Alliance and Benchmarks.

== Committee assignments ==
=== 2025–2026 session ===
- Appropriations
- Appropriations - Justice and Public Safety
- Election Law
- Select Committee on Helene Recovery
- Judiciary II
- Regulatory Reform
- Rules, Calendar, and Operations of the House

=== 2023–2024 session ===
- Appropriations
- Appropriations - Justice and Public Safety
- Judiciary II (Chair)
- Redistricting
- Regulatory Reform

=== 2021–2022 session ===
- Appropriations
- Appropriations - Capital
- Judiciary II (Chair)
- Regulatory Reform

=== 2019–2020 session ===
- Appropriations
- Appropriations - Capital
- Judiciary (Chair)
- Regulatory Reform
- Homelessness, Foster Care, and Dependency

=== 2017–2018 session ===
- Appropriations
- Appropriations - Justice and Public Safety
- Judiciary I (Vice Chair)
- Rules, Calendar, and Operations of the House (Vice Chair)
- Regulatory Reform
- Homelessness, Foster Care, and Dependency
- State Personnel

=== 2015–2016 session ===
- Appropriations
- Appropriations - Justice and Public Safety (Vice Chair)
- Judiciary III (Chair)
- Children, Youth and Families (Chair)
- Regulatory Reform
- State Personnel
- Environment
- Education - Community Colleges

=== 2013–2014 session ===
- Appropriations
- Judiciary (Vice Chair)
- State Personnel
- Ethics
- Health and Human Services

=== 2011–2012 session ===
- Appropriations
- Judiciary
- State Personnel
- Education
- Insurance

=== 2009–2010 session ===
- Appropriations
- Judiciary I
- Juvenile Justice
- Science and Technology
- Ways and Means - Broadband Connectivity

== Electoral history ==
=== 2024 ===
North Carolina House of Representatives 90th district general election, 2024
Party	Candidate	Votes	%
Republican	Sarah Stevens (incumbent)	35,674	77.90%
Democratic	Ken Badgett	10,119	22.10%
Total votes		45,793	100%
Republican hold			

=== 2022 ===
North Carolina House of Representatives 90th district Republican primary election, 2022
Party	Candidate	Votes	%
Republican	Sarah Stevens (incumbent)	6,526	72.43%
Republican	Benjamin Romans	2,484	27.57%
Total votes		9,010	100%

North Carolina House of Representatives 90th district general election, 2022
Party	Candidate	Votes	%
Republican	Sarah Stevens (incumbent)	24,398	100%
Total votes		24,398	100%
Republican hold			

=== 2020 ===
North Carolina House of Representatives 90th district general election, 2020
Party	Candidate	Votes	%
Republican	Sarah Stevens (incumbent)	30,028	74.57%
Democratic	Beth Shaw	10,242	25.43%
Total votes		40,270	100%
Republican hold			

=== 2018 ===
North Carolina House of Representatives 90th district Republican primary election, 2018
Party	Candidate	Votes	%
Republican	Sarah Stevens (incumbent)	4,060	66.57%
Republican	Allen Poindexter	2,039	33.43%
Total votes		6,099	100%

North Carolina House of Representatives 90th district general election, 2018
Party	Candidate	Votes	%
Republican	Sarah Stevens (incumbent)	18,373	68.35%
Democratic	John Worth Wiles	7,170	26.68%
Constitution	Allen Poindexter	1,336	4.97%
Total votes		26,879	100%
Republican hold			

=== 2016 ===
North Carolina House of Representatives 90th district general election, 2016
Party	Candidate	Votes	%
Republican	Sarah Stevens (incumbent)	23,678	73.26%
Democratic	Vera Smith Reynolds	8,641	26.74%
Total votes		32,319	100%
Republican hold			

=== 2014 ===
North Carolina House of Representatives 90th district general election, 2014
Party	Candidate	Votes	%
Republican	Sarah Stevens (incumbent)	13,440	68.25%
Democratic	John Worth Wiles	6,251	31.75%
Total votes		19,691	100%
Republican hold			

=== 2012 ===
North Carolina House of Representatives 90th district general election, 2012
Party	Candidate	Votes	%
Republican	Sarah Stevens (incumbent)	23,153	100%
Total votes		23,153	100%
Republican hold			

=== 2010 ===
North Carolina House of Representatives 90th district general election, 2010
Party	Candidate	Votes	%
Republican	Sarah Stevens (incumbent)	12,274	71.10%
Democratic	Randy Wolfe	4,988	28.90%
Total votes		17,262	100%
Republican hold			

=== 2008 ===
North Carolina House of Representatives 90th district general election, 2008
Party	Candidate	Votes	%
Republican	Sarah Stevens	13,263	50.58%
Democratic	Jim Harrell (incumbent)	12,957	49.42%
Total votes		26,220	100%
Republican gain from Democratic			

North Carolina House of Representatives
Preceded by Paul Stam	Speaker pro tempore of the North Carolina House of Representatives; 2017–2025	Succeeded by Mitchell Setzer
